= Languages of Finland =

- Official: Finnish (1st: 84%, 2nd: 13%); Swedish (1st: 5%, 2nd: 44%)
- Minority: Officially recognized: Sámi, Romani, Finnish Sign Language, Finland-Swedish Sign Language, Karelian
- Immigrant: Estonian, Russian, Arabic, Somali, English, Kurdish, Albanian, Persian, Chinese, Vietnamese, Thai, Tagalog, Turkish, Spanish
- Foreign: English (70%); German (30%); French (10%)
- Signed: Finnish Sign Language, Finland-Swedish Sign Language
- Keyboard layout: QWERTY; Basic Finnish/Swedish Finnish Multilingual

The two main official languages of Finland are Finnish and Swedish. There are also several official minority languages: three Sámi languages, as well as Romani, Finnish Sign Language, Finland-Swedish Sign Language and Karelian.

== Official languages ==
=== Finnish ===
Municipalities of Finland: unilingually Finnish bilingual with Finnish as majority language, Swedish as minority language bilingual with Swedish as majority language, Finnish as minority language unilingually Swedish bilingual with Finnish as majority language, Sámi as minority language

Finnish is a Finnic language which is part of the broader Uralic language family. It is one of the two national languages along Swedish; its official status is granted by Section 17 of the Constitution of Finland. It is the main language of education, media, and administration. As of 2024, it is spoken as a first language by 84.1% of the population.

Excluding transcontinental countries, Finland is one of the four European countries whose majority language is not Indo-European. As a Finnic language, Finnish is closely related to the Estonian and Karelian languages. As a Uralic language, it is also more distantly related to the Sámi languages and Hungarian. It has been influenced the most by Swedish, historical stages of other Germanic languages, and—to a lesser extent—by Baltic languages and Russian. The language displays systematic vowel harmony, with a set of front and back vowels. It is an agglutinative language, and its unmarked sentences most typically follow the subect–verb–object word order. As is typical in Uralic languages, grammatical gender is absent.

Finnish has a high degree of linguistic variation. It has regional dialects and informal spoken varieties (puhekieli) that are distinct from the standard register, known as yleiskieli—or, when written, as kirjakieli, lit. 'book language'.

=== Swedish ===
Map of the Swedish varieties spoken in Finland.

Swedish is a North Germanic language which is part of the Indo-European language family. It holds co-official status with Finnish, as stated in Section 17 of the Constitution.

Swedish, along with Finnish, is a compulsory subject in all schools, and all students must start studying Swedish in sixth grade at the latest.

The national Finnish broadcaster Yle has a dedicated Swedish-language department called Svenska Yle. There are nine Swedish-language newspapers in Finland—of which Hufvudstadsbladet is the only national daily, and some of them are part of the Minority Dailies Association. Public authorities, especially in bilingual municipalities, are required to provide services and information in both languages, and Swedish-speakers may use Swedish with all state bodies, including courts and emergency services. Public TV broadcasting in Åland is handled by Ålands Radio and TV. Åland has two newspapers, Nya Åland and Ålandstidningen.

As of 2024, 5.1% of the population of Finland speaks Swedish as its first language, down from 13% at the beginning of the 20th century. In 2012, 44% of Finnish citizens with another registered primary language other than Swedish could hold a conversation in this language. First-language Swedish speakers are mostly concentrated in the Ostrobothnia and Uusimaa regions, as well as Åland and the area around Turku (Åboland). The region with the highest percentage of first-language Swedish speakers is Åland (85.2%), where Finnish (spoken by 4.5%) is not official. The four largest Swedish-speaking municipalities in mainland Finland, in absolute numbers, are those of Helsinki, Espoo, Porvoo and Vaasa. In Helsinki, currently 5.5% of the population are native Swedish speakers and 18.3% are native speakers of languages other than Finnish and Swedish.

The Swedish varieties of mainland Finland (known as Finland Swedish, Swedish: finlandssvenska) have been influenced by Finnish in phonology and some vocabulary. Standard Swedish in Finland closely follows the written standard in Sweden, although it has phonetic differences due to Finnish influence. Most notably, Finland Swedish lacks tone, voiceless plosive aspiration, retroflex consonants, and the sj- and tj-sounds are pronounced [ɕ ~ ʃ ~ ʂ] and [tɕ ~ tʃ] respectively. These differences are not present in most Åland dialects, which are closer to Central Swedish.

There is a rich Finland-Swedish literature, including authors such as Tove Jansson, Johan Ludvig Runeberg, Edith Södergran and Zacharias Topelius. Runeberg is considered Finland's national poet and wrote the national anthem "Vårt land" in Swedish; it was only later translated to Finnish.

=== History ===
Historically, Swedish was the sole language of the administration under both Swedish and Russian rule, until Tsar Alexander II's language decrees of 1863 and 1902 made Finnish official in the Grand Duchy of Finland. Russian served as a third co-official language with Finnish and Swedish between 1900 and 1917, although practical use was limited.

== Minority languages ==
=== Sámi languages ===
Traditional areas where the Sámi languages are spoken. (5) Northern Sámi; (6) Inari Sámi; (7) Skolt Sámi.

The Sámi languages are a group of Uralic languages spoken by the indigenous Sámi people in an area that traditionally covers northern Fennoscandia; this area is known as Sápmi. Three Sámi languages are spoken in Finland: Northern Sámi, Inari Sámi and Skolt Sámi. The Sámi languages are recognized as indigenous by Section 17 of the Constitution of Finland, which grants them the right to "maintain and develop their own language and culture."

The Basic Education Act of 1998 grants the right to have Sámi languages as media of instruction in grades 1–9 within the Sámi homeland. Total-immersion programmes for ages 1–6, known as language nests (kielipesä), are active for all three Sámi languages in Finland; there are twelve nests in total. They have been particularly successful for revitalization of Inari Sámi.

Finland has fewer Sámi-language print media outlets than Norway or Sweden, and most Northern Sámi-language media is published or broadcast within Norway. Yle, the national broadcasting company in Finland, handles most online news, television and radio and in the Sámi languages, and its Sámi-language projects are often in collaboration with national broadcasting companies in Norway and Sweden. The first Sámi-language publication in Finland was the Northern Sámi magazine Sápmelaš (1936–2011). The regional newspaper Lapin Kansa has included Sámi-language news in its print and online editions since 2012. Other currently active Sámi-language publications in Finland include the Inari Sámi periodical Anarâš, and the academic journal Dutkansearvvi Dieđalaš Áigečála.

The use of the Sámi languages in administration is regulated by the constitution and the Sámi Language Act of 2003, whereby Sámi speakers have the right to use their language before authorities in the Sámi homeland, as well as nationwide bodies like Kela, the Finnish Tax Administration and DVV. They also have the right to official documents in their Sámi language when dealing with a government office. Additionally, authorities in the homeland must ensure customer service and interpretation in Sámi. However, due to insufficient funding, outdated legislation and lack of awareness among staff, these rights are not always guaranteed.

As of 2024, the total number of Sámi speakers in Finland is 2,077, or 0.04% of the population, out of an estimated total of 8,000–10,000 Sámi people living in Finland. The municipalities where Sámi is recognized as 'native' are Enontekiö, Inari, Utsjoki and Sodankylä. Northern Sámi is spoken in all Sámi municipalities of Finland, and it is the most widely spoken Sámi language, both in Finland and worldwide. Inari Sámi is the only Sámi language spoken exclusively within the borders of Finland, around Lake Inari. Skolt Sámi is also spoken in the Inari municipality. Inari and Skolt Sámi are estimated to be spoken by roughly 400 and 300 people, respectively.

Northern Sámi is classified as a Western Sámi language, while Inari and Skolt Sámi are Eastern. As Uralic languages, they are distantly related to Finnish. All three have had extensive contact with Proto-Germanic, Proto-Norse and Scandinavian languages, as well as Finnic languages; they have also had some influence from Baltic and Slavic languages. Sámi and Finnish have borrowed words from one another throughout their history. The Sámi languages are typologically similar to Finnish, although they tend to have richer consonant gradation and vowel alternation, and fewer noun cases (nine at most).

The Government of Finland has a history of assimilating the indigenous Sámi people into the Finnish-speaking majority. Systematic language assimilation began in the 17th century, and teaching and speaking Sámi in schools was forbidden until the 1970s.

=== Karelian ===
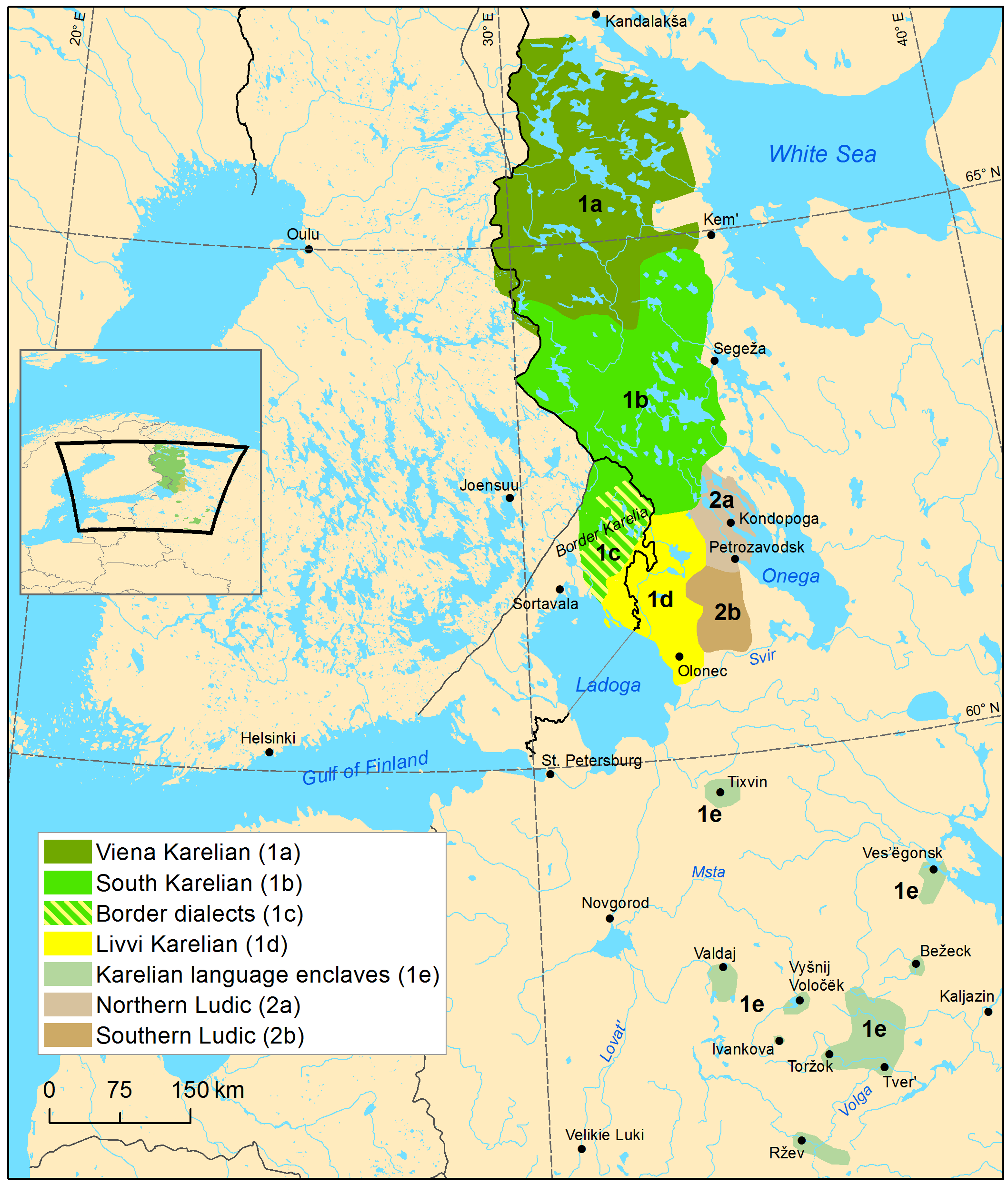
Distribution of the Karelian and Ludic languages at the beginning of the 20th century. Karelian is highlighted in green and yellow.

Karelian is a Northern Finnic language. It is recognized as a non-regional (ei-alueellinen) language under Part II of the European Charter for Regional or Minority Languages since November 2009. The language is not taught in schools, although it has been offered as elective courses at the University of Eastern Finland since 2009. Yle provides some online content and limited TV programming in Karelian, and occasional private publications exist, such as the bilingual magazine Oma Suojärvi. Local authorities do not recognize Karelian as a separate language due to its lack of recognition in the constitution.

Statistics Finland does not register Karelian as a separate language. State bodies (Kotus, Ministry of Justice) indicate that the number of Karelian speakers in Finland is approximately 5,000. According to Anneli Sarhimaa, the Karelian Language Society estimated in 1995 that there are around 5,000 fluent speakers and another 20,000 with at least some knowledge of the language, while her 2017 estimates place the number of fluent speakers at 11,000. She also states that "the standard assumption is that the majority of the speakers of Karelian in Finland are elderly people".

Karelian, although described as autochthonous, is now recognized as non-regional because there is no significant concentration of Karelian speakers within a specific region due to the evacuation of Finnish Karelia in the 1940s. Until the Winter War, Karelian was spoken in the historical Border Karelia region on the northeastern shore of Lake Ladoga. The Greater Helsinki area and Joensuu have been identified as significant centres in 2017. The latter city functions as the national hub for Karelian-language research, teaching and events, thanks to state funding to the University of Eastern Finland.

As a Northern Finnic language, Karelian is closely related to Finnish. The two languages are mutually intelligible at elementary levels of everyday communication. Before World War II, the Karelian varieties traditionally spoken in Finland were Southern Karelian and Livvi-Karelian; refugees from Russia who moved to Finland before World War II also spoke Northern Karelian. As of 2011, Livvi-Karelian was the most widely spoken variety in Finland, although Northern and Southern varieties were also present. Karelian has had extensive contact with Russian, which has had a significant influence on the language.

The Karelian language is different from dialects of the Finnish language that are sometimes labelled South Karelian.

=== Romani ===
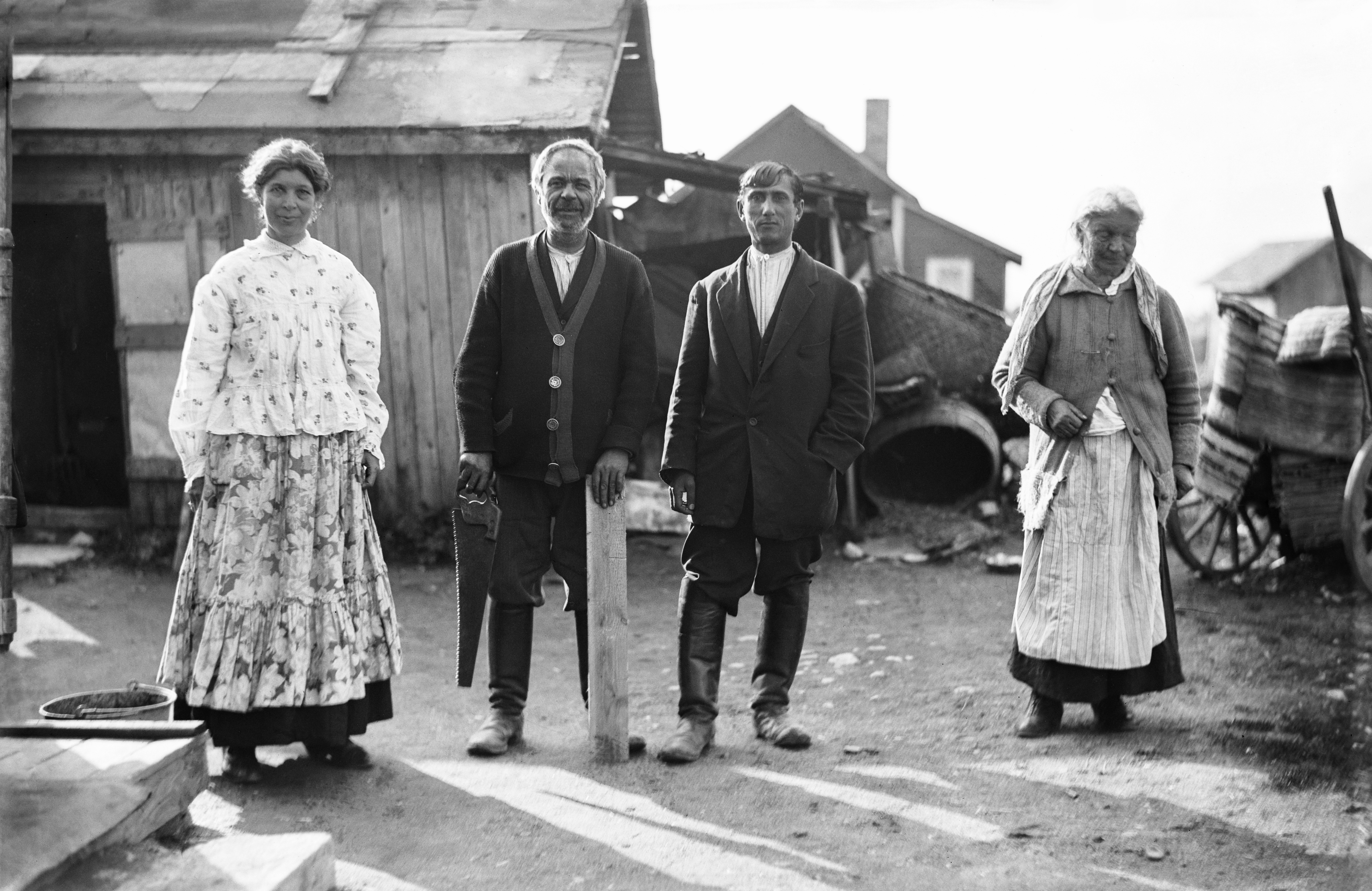
Romani people photographed in Malmi, Helsinki

The Romani language traditionally spoken in Finland is called Kalo or Kàlo. It has been spoken in Finland for roughly 450–500 years, with the earliest attestation dating to 1559 in Åland. It belongs to the Indo-Aryan branch of the Indo-European language family, and it is thought to be derived from Sanskrit. Finnish Romani is classified as a Northern Romani dialect; within that grouping, it is labelled Northwestern or considered a dialect of its own.

Finnish Romani is spoken by about 3,000–4,000 people, (Note: Estimates on the number of Roma people living in Finland range from 10,000 to 12,000 people. Of these, a third speak Romani.) and the number of its speakers has dropped by almost 40% over the past fifty years. Most Finnish Roma speak Finnish or Swedish in their day-to-day life.

According to the Finnish Constitution, the Finnish Roma have the right to practise their language and culture. This right was first written into the Constitution in 1995. It has been recognised under Part II of the European Charter for Regional or Minority Languages since 1994 as a non-territorial (ei-alueellinen) language. The Romani Language Board (romanikielen lautakunta), which regulates and proposes a standard for Finnish Romani under the authority of Kotus, has sought the application of Part III of the Charter to the language. Unlike Finnish, Swedish and the Sámi languages, Finnish Romani does not have a dedicated Language Act, which means it is not possible to use Romani with authorities, although Roma people themselves do not deem it necessary to receive public services through Romani.

Finnish municipalities may organise education in Finnish Kalo, if there is a sufficient number of children to form a group. A significant challenge to this is the lack of Finnish Kalo teachers. Students can take the Finnish Matriculation exam (ylioppilastutkinto) at the end of secondary education in the Romani language.

Mass media use of Romani began at the end of the 1990s. Since 1995, Yle has broadcast the short news programme Romano mirits, which includes "a few minutes of Romani-language news". As of 2009, there is no television programme in Finnish Romani. The language is used in some publications such as Romano boodos and Latšo diives; the latter is published by the Finnish National Agency for Education.

The traditional varieties of Finnish Romani are considered conservative in their noun inflection. However, language decline and heavy language contact caused convergence with Finnish grammar; this led to the creation of the term "Fennoromani" (analogous with the name of Para-Romani varieties, such as "Angloromani" and "Scandoromani"). Finnish elements such as front-back vowel harmony, stop devoicing, word order and case government are reflected in Finnish Romani, although there is a limited number of loanwords from Finnish, possibly due to the secretive function of the language. Germanic languages such as Swedish, Danish and German varieties have influenced the language's lexicon. There are two main Finnish Romani sub-dialects: Eastern and Western. The Western dialect is concentrated around Vaasa, while the Eastern dialect is present across the country.

=== Sign languages ===
In Finland, two sign languages are recognized: Finnish Sign Language and Finland-Swedish Sign Language. Both belong to the Swedish Sign Language family.

Finnish Sign Language is the most commonly used sign language in Finland. The Finnish Association of the Deaf (Kuurojen liitto) estimates that 5,500 people use Finnish Sign Language as their mother tongue, 3,000 of whom are deaf. Finland-Swedish Sign Language has around 300 signers, and is severely endangered.

== Immigrant languages ==
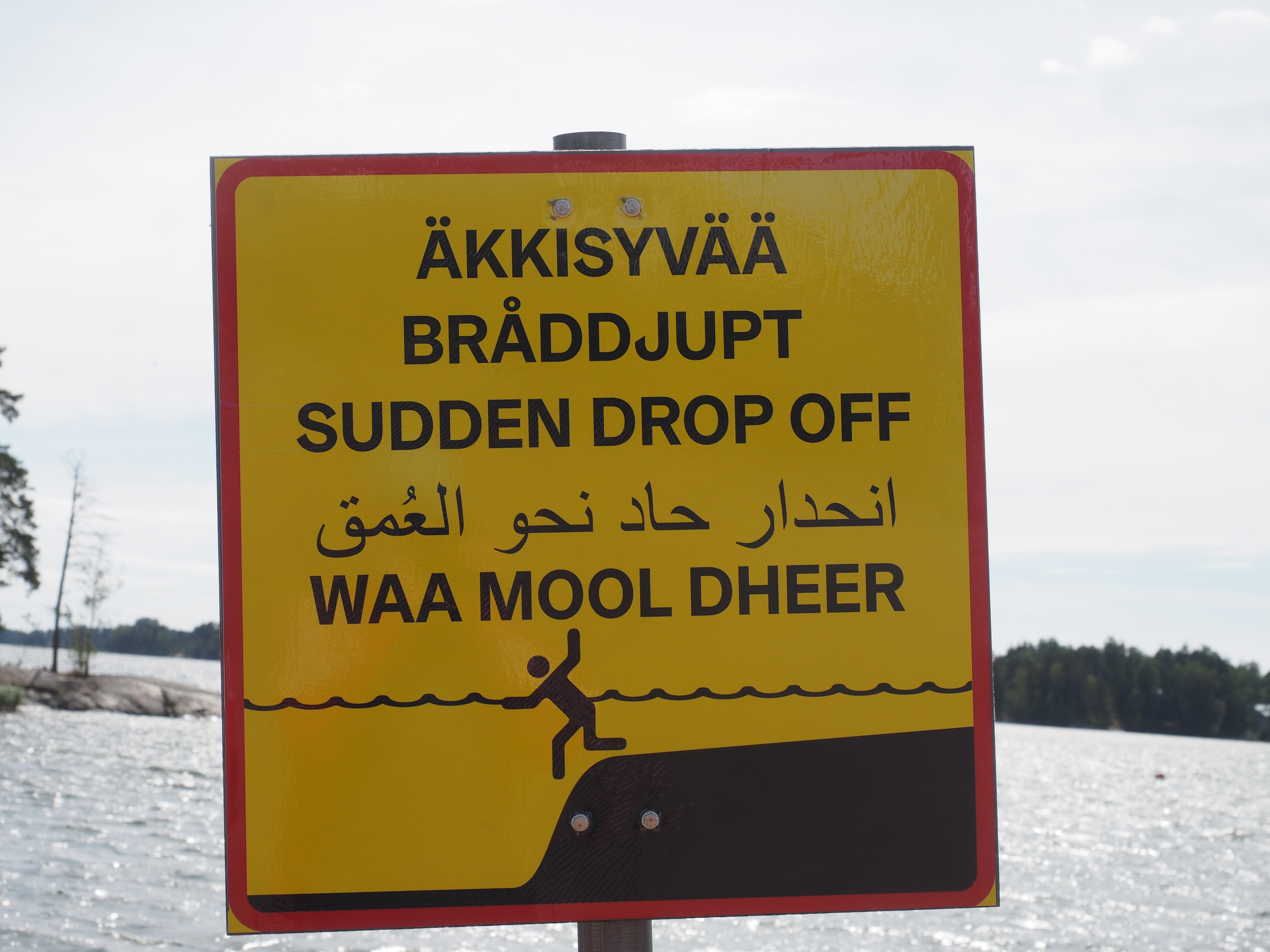
A warning sign with Arabic language included in Vuosaari, Helsinki.

As of 2017, 93% of Finns aged 18–64 can speak a foreign language, and 78% of these people can speak two or more languages. Of these, 2,184,000 (66%) can speak both Swedish and English, 1,003,000 (30%) can speak German and English, and 882,000 (27%) can speak Swedish and German.

As of 2025, 646,392 people, or 11.4%, live in Finland with a first language other than Finnish, Swedish or Sámi.

=== English ===
Most Finns are able to have a conversation in English. English is the first language of 0.7% of the Finnish population.

=== Russian ===
Russian is an East Slavic language. As of 2024, there are 102,487 Russian speakers in Finland, or 1.8% of the population. Although Finland was part of the Russian Empire from 1809 to 1917, the presence of Russian in modern Finland is due to migration flows that happened since the collapse of the Soviet Union, and especially since 2000. Some are people with Finnish descent (mostly Ingrian Finns) that were invited to move to Finland through a programme initiated by President Mauno Koivisto in 1990.

Despite being the third native language by number of speakers in the country, Russian has no legal recognition as a minority language, since it is recognised as a "language of migrants". It is only recognised under Part II of the European Charter for Regional or Minority Languages. Language services to immigrants are granted in a variety of languages, including Russian.

The Basic Education Act grants pupils the right to instruction in their native language (if it is not Finnish or Swedish) if a group of four students of similar age can be formed; as of 2015, 5,051 of registered pupils in this programme chose to study Russian. Since no textbooks for these classes are produced in Finland, this material is imported from Russia. Sometimes, the content of these textbooks is aimed at fostering Russian patriotism, although there have been no public controversies on the matter, since teachers are expected to filter such content. Some bilingual schools are present, including the Finnish-Russian School and the Eastern Finland International School. Russian is taught at nine universities.

Yle provides Russian-language news services. Radio news bulletins started in 1990, and in 2013, Yle launched Novosti Yle, a five-minute daily bulletin. The best-known Russian-language periodical was Spektr, which was published online from 1998 to 2021. Current publications include Finskaja gazeta and Mosaiikki. According to a 2014 survey, although most Russian speakers were at least indifferent to Russian-language news reports from Yle, they trusted them considerably less the general Finnish population: 92% of the latter consider Yle a reliable source of information.

=== Estonian ===
As of 2024, there were 49,563 people in Finland who spoke Estonian as their native language, making up approximately 0.9% of the total population.

=== Arabic ===
As of 2024, 43,534 people speak Arabic in Finland, representing approximately 0.8% of the total population.

== Territorial bilingualism ==
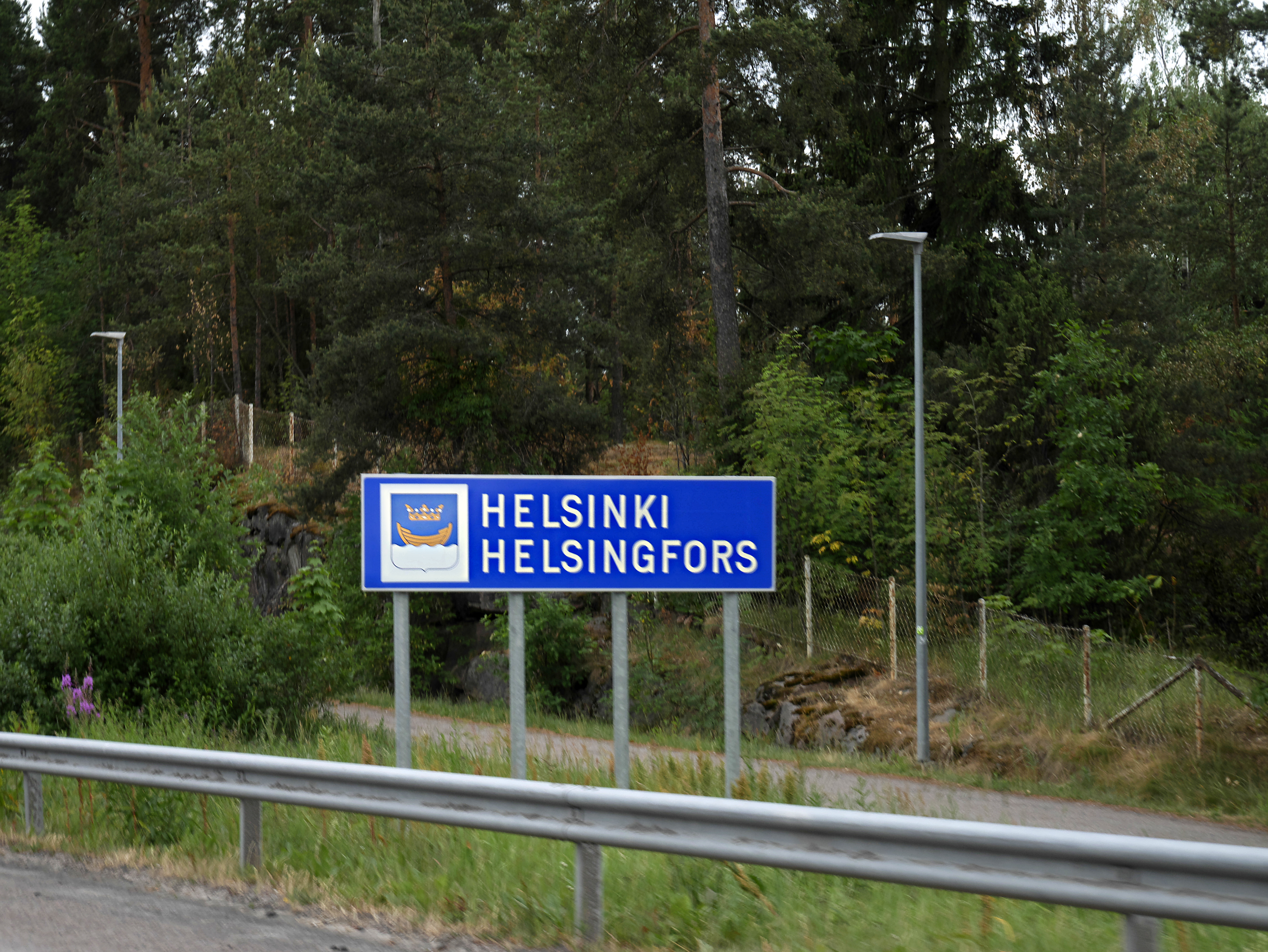
For example, in some regions road signs are written first in Finnish and then in Swedish or even in some areas vice versa.

Except for Åland, a municipality is considered bilingual when either 8% or 3,000 of its residents speak both Finnish and Swedish. Swedish meets these criteria in 33 out of 308 municipalities, mostly located in the coastal areas of the Ostrobothnia region, Southwest Finland (especially in Åboland outside Turku) and Uusimaa. Finnish reaches the criteria everywhere but in Åland.

The Sámi languages have an official status in the northernmost Finland, in Utsjoki, Inari, Enontekiö and part of Sodankylä, regardless of proportion of speakers.

In the bilingual municipalities signs are in both languages, important documents are translated and authorities have to be able to serve in both languages. National-level administration has to serve the public in both official languages, regardless of location, and in Sámi in certain circumstances.

Places often have official names in Finnish and Swedish, or Finnish and Sámi, both names being equally official as name of the town. For a list, see Names of places in Finland in Finnish and in Swedish.

== Statistics ==
=== Nationwide ===
Residents of Finland by native language (1995, 2005, 2015 and 2025)
Language	1995	%	2005	%	2015	%	2025	%
Finnish	4,754,787	92.92%	4,819,819	91.71%	4,865,628	88.67%	4,719,802	83.49%
Swedish	294,664	5.76%	289,675	5.51%	290,161	5.29%	284,611	5.03%
Russian	15,872	0.31%	39,653	0.75%	72,436	1.32%	102,618	1.82%
Estonian	8,710	0.17%	15,336	0.29%	48,087	0.88%	48,495	0.86%
Ukrainian	133	0.00%	611	0.01%	2,843	0.05%	46,696	0.83%
Arabic	2,901	0.06%	7,117	0.14%	16,713	0.30%	44,956	0.80%
English	5,324	0.10%	8,928	0.17%	17,784	0.32%	39,100	0.69%
Somali	4,057	0.08%	8,593	0.16%	17,871	0.33%	28,167	0.50%
Persian	803	0.02%	3,165	0.06%	8,745	0.16%	24,047	0.43%
Chinese	2,180	0.04%	4,613	0.09%	10,722	0.20%	20,320	0.36%
Albanian	2,019	0.04%	5,076	0.10%	9,233	0.17%	19,600	0.35%
Kurdish	1,381	0.03%	5,123	0.10%	11,271	0.21%	18,460	0.33%
Vietnamese	2,785	0.05%	4,202	0.08%	8,273	0.15%	17,682	0.31%
Bengali	373	0.01%	920	0.02%	2,881	0.05%	14,013	0.25%
Turkish	1,809	0.04%	3,595	0.07%	7,082	0.13%	13,790	0.24%
Tagalog	375	0.01%	764	0.01%	2,932	0.05%	13,380	0.24%
Thai	813	0.02%	3,033	0.06%	8,582	0.16%	12,712	0.22%
Nepali	31	0.00%	256	0.00%	2,951	0.05%	12,204	0.22%
Spanish	1,394	0.03%	2,937	0.06%	7,025	0.13%	12,088	0.21%
Urdu	179	0.00%	594	0.01%	2,432	0.04%	9,512	0.17%
Sinhala	92	0.00%	155	0.00%	334	0.01%	9,076	0.16%
German	2,719	0.05%	4,114	0.08%	6,168	0.11%	8,003	0.14%
Romanian	368	0.01%	886	0.02%	3,161	0.06%	7,310	0.13%
Polish	1,129	0.02%	1,445	0.03%	4,794	0.09%	6,298	0.11%
French	1,062	0.02%	2,071	0.04%	3,878	0.07%	6,136	0.11%
Hindi	239	0.00%	779	0.01%	1,882	0.03%	5,556	0.10%
Portuguese	297	0.01%	865	0.02%	2,409	0.04%	4,694	0.08%
Latvian	76	0.00%	391	0.01%	1,464	0.03%	4,023	0.07%
Italian	574	0.01%	1,177	0.02%	2,492	0.05%	3,937	0.07%
Hungarian	732	0.01%	1,206	0.02%	2,811	0.05%	3,827	0.07%
Tamil	86	0.00%	419	0.01%	1,673	0.03%	3,817	0.07%
Swahili	75	0.00%	372	0.01%	1,641	0.03%	3,663	0.06%
Bulgarian	400	0.01%	629	0.01%	2,313	0.04%	3,570	0.06%
Sámi	1,726	0.03%	1,752	0.03%	1,957	0.04%	2,076	0.04%

Residents of Finland by language family (2019)
Family	No. of speakers	Percentage
Finno-Ugric	4,877,161	88.27%
Germanic	320,016	5.79%
Slavic	102,161	1.85%
Afroasiatic	57,844	1.05%
Indo-Iranian	47,804	0.87%
Romance	24,802	0.45%
Sino-Tibetan	13,760	0.25%
Turkic	11,651	0.21%
Austroasiatic	11,459	0.21%
Tai	10,243	0.19%
Niger-Congo	8,841	0.16%
Austronesian	5,678	0.10%
Dravidian	4,036	0.07%
Baltic	3,884	0.07%
Greek	1,716	0.03%
Japonic	1,617	0.03%
Caucasian	932	0.02%
Other Indo-European	12,141	0.22%
Other Asian	958	0.02%
Other	8,588	0.16%

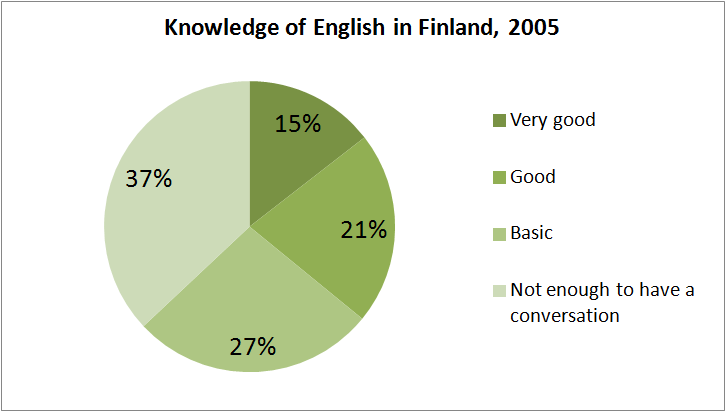
Knowledge of the English language in Finland, 2005. According to the Eurobarometer, 63% of the respondents indicated that they know English well enough to have a conversation. Of these 23% (percent, not percentage points) reported a very good knowledge of the language whereas 34% had a good knowledge and 43% basic English skills.

Residents of Finland aged 18–64 that have some knowledge of foreign languages in 2017.
Language	Percentage
English	90%
Swedish	67%
German	31%
French	11%
Finnish	10%
Spanish	10%
Russian	8%

=== By region ===
A map of Lapland's municipalities, shaded by the percentage of the population that speaks a Sámi language (as of 2024).

Percentage of language speakers by region (2024)
Region	Finnish	Swedish	Sámi	Foreign
Åland	4.5%	85.2%	0.0%	10.3%
Central Finland	94.4%	0.2%	0.0%	5.5%
Central Ostrobothnia	86.4%	8.7%	0.0%	4.9%
Kainuu	94.0%	0.1%	0.0%	5.9%
Kanta-Häme	93.0%	0.4%	0.0%	6.6%
Kymenlaakso	91.4%	0.7%	0.0%	7.9%
Lapland	94.1%	0.3%	0.9%	4.7%
North Karelia	93.3%	0.1%	0.0%	6.6%
North Ostrobothnia	95.1%	0.2%	0.0%	4.6%
North Savo	94.6%	0.1%	0.0%	5.3%
Ostrobothnia	39.9%	49.4%	0.0%	10.7%
Päijät-Häme	91.8%	0.4%	0.0%	7.8%
Pirkanmaa	92.2%	0.4%	0.0%	7.4%
Satakunta	93.7%	0.4%	0.0%	6.0%
South Karelia	90.4%	0.2%	0.0%	9.4%
South Ostrobothnia	95.3%	0.3%	0.0%	4.3%
South Savo	94.0%	0.2%	0.0%	5.8%
Southwest Finland	83.4%	5.6%	0.0%	11.0%
Uusimaa	73.7%	7.2%	0.0%	19.0%
Mainland Finland	84.5%	4.6%	0.0%	10.8%
Finland	84.1%	5.1%	0.0%	10.8%

== See also ==
- Finland's language strife
- Languages of Åland
- Names of places in Finland in Finnish and in Swedish
- Demographics of Finland
