= Swedish Sign Language =

Official sign language of Sweden

- Svenskt Teckenspråk
- Native to: Sweden
- Native speakers: 13,000 (2023)
- Language family: Swedish Sign: Swedish Sign Language
- Writing system: SignWriting

Language codes
- ISO 639-3: swl
- Glottolog: swed1236
- ELP: Swedish Sign Language

The Swedish Sign Language word for "part-time"

Swedish Sign Language (SSL; Swedish: Svenskt teckenspråk or STS) is the sign language used in Sweden. It is recognized by the Swedish government as the country's official sign language, and hearing parents of deaf individuals are entitled to access state-sponsored classes that facilitate their learning of STS. There are around 13,000 native speakers and a total of 30,000 speakers.

== History ==
Swedish sign language first came into use in 1800. It does not stem from any other languages. In fact, this self-created language went on to influence Finnish Sign Language and Portuguese Sign Language. 1809 marks the year of the first deaf school, Manillaskolan, in Sweden. It was not until 1981 that Swedish Sign Language was recognized as a national language of Sweden. However, this made Sweden one of the first countries in the world to legally recognize a sign language as such.

Swedish Sign Language family tree

Old British Sign Language? (c. 1760–1900)
Swedish Sign Language (c. 1800–present)
Portuguese Sign Language (c. 1820–present) | Finnish Sign Language (c. 1850–present)
Cape Verdian Sign Language (c. 20th century–present) | Finland-Swedish Sign Language (c. 1850–present) | Eritrean Sign Language (c. 1950–present)
São Tomé and Príncipe Sign Language? (c. 21st century–present)

== Hand alphabet ==
Pär Aron Borg is credited with creating the original hand alphabet in Swedish Sign Language. This handshape system served as a foundational reference for fingerspelling in Swedish Sign Language.

The hand alphabet in Swedish Sign Language has developed since Pär Aron Borg's original creation.

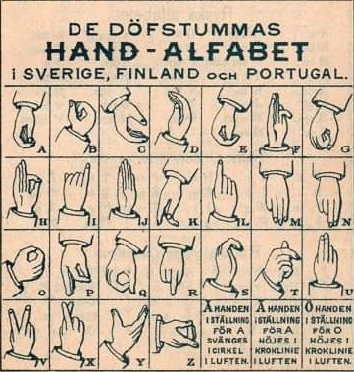
Pär Aron Borg's hand alphabet

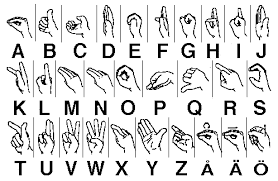
Swedish sign language alphabet

== Education and communication ==
Per the Education Act of 1998, deaf children are expected to be able to write in Swedish and English, in addition to expressing their thoughts in Swedish Sign Language. Thus, six state-run schools (one of which specializes in learning disabilities) have been established regionally for deaf children who cannot attend traditional comprehensive schools. Comprehensive and secondary schools in Sweden offer classes in addition to a one-year program to students to learn Swedish Sign Language as a third national language, as well as in hopes of becoming an interpreter. Interpreters are found in hospitals, and they also teach the language to the parents and siblings of deaf children. Sweden provides 240 hours of courses over four years to parents so that they may learn to communicate with their children. Additionally, weekly courses in the language are also available to the siblings of deaf children and the children of deaf parents.

== Expanding the culture of the deaf ==
Since the recognition of Swedish Sign Language as a national language of Sweden, the Swedish government has made television shows and news broadcasts in sign language available to deaf individuals. Subtitles in sign language are also increasing. On 29 November 2001 the first Bible was translated into Swedish Sign Language. Furthermore, the Health and Medical Service Act (1982) guaranteed interpreters for deaf and hard-of-hearing individuals in working life, in leisure and in club activities.

== See also ==
- Signed Swedish
