= Judy Shepard (disambiguation) =

Judy Shepard is an activist.

Judy or Judith Shepard may also refer to:

- Judith Shepard (actress), commonly known by married name Judith Chapman

== See also ==
- Judy Shepard-Kegl
- Judy Shepherd (disambiguation)
