= Eritrean Sign Language =

Sign language used in Eritrea

- Native to: Eritrea
- Language family: Swedish Sign Language family: Eritrean Sign Language

Language codes
- ISO 639-3: –
- IETF: fse-ER

Eritrean Sign Language (EriSL), also known as Quwanquwa Mïlïkït Eritra, is a sign language widely used in Eritrea by an estimated 15,000 deaf Eritrean individuals who live there, even though this approximation does not account for the total number of signers, regardless of their hearing capacity. Before its officialization, Eritrean Sign Language's lexicon appeared to follow traditional home sign characteristics, evolving diversely from village to village.

Eritrea underwent a series of colonization, lasting almost four centuries, from the Ottoman Empire, the British Empire, and the Italian Empire, though not resulting in significant linguistic influences in EriSL. It formally developed out of the Swedish and Finnish Sign Languages, which were introduced by Swedish and Finnish Christian missionaries in 1955, containing a certain amount of local Eritrean home signs, and having ASL-based Sudanese influences. Ethiopian sign language did not affect the development of EriSL, given its formal introduction not earlier than 20 years after the advancements of Eritrean Sign Language.

The heterogeneity of sign language acquisition in Eritrea is significantly influenced by the limited education available in more remote areas of the country. This limits not only the contact and social engagement that the Deaf community is commonly prone to but also the sense of Deaf identity that forms consequent to proximity and exposure to other Deaf individuals.

== History of Eritrean Deaf Education ==
Prior to the founding of schools for the deaf in Keren and Asmara, there is no documented evidence of indigenous signs. A Swedish missionary in 1945 meeting three deaf children led to the establishment of a class for deaf children in 1955. This first class had five students. In 1957, with funding from Finnish missionaries, a school called "Evangelical Church School for the Deaf, Keren" was founded. Swedish-Finnish Signs were taught in the school.

During the war between Eritrea and Ethiopia from 1962 to 1991, Deaf education was moved from Keren to Asmara. In 1980 the Deaf community returned to Keren. A permanent school was established in Asmara, in 1988, a day school, while the one in Keren is a residential program. There was variation between the signing of students of the two schools. The mission influence on Eritrean Sign Language was present from the start of deaf education. The students were taught using Swedish and Finnish Signs. All instructors were initially foreign. These instructors left Eritrea following the rising conflict between Eritrea and Ethiopia in the 1970s. Two Eritrean teachers, Neguyse and Besserat Tekleab, filled the role left by the foreign instructors. They changed the pedagogical approach, instructing the students in the Tigrinya, the native spoken language of Eritrea.

Another major pedagogical change to the instruction of deaf students was the introduction of Manual Ge'ez. Ge'ez is the script used to write Tigrinya, and other languages used in Eritrea and Ethiopia. This fingerspelling system was developed by neighboring Ethiopia in 1979 and introduced to Eritrean Deaf education the same year. This fingerspelling system allowed deaf Eritreans to communicate in Tigrinya, greatly expanding their communicative reach.

== Eritrean National Association of the Deaf (EriNAD) ==
The Eritrea National Association of the Deaf (EriNAD), established in 1998 in Asmara, provided the community with their first handbook of EriSL basic signs to spread a more uniform language education nationwide. The first official dictionary was conceived in 2006, completed in 2009, and published in 2010 under the counsel of EriNAD. This handpicked encyclopedia contained signs recognized as the most commonly used, considering many home signs brought forward by the collectives representing larger villages from the six regions of Eritrea. EriNAD was significantly influential in promoting the advocacy and participation of EriSL interpreters in various institutions (academic, work-related, etc.), thereby fostering further Deaf inclusivity in a predominantly hearing society. This latter has been a topic of discussion for many years, given the deeply felt unequal placement in a convoluted social stratification system, such as the one present in Eritrea concerning disabled people. An example of a rejected agency occurred due to the Ministry of Education (Special Needs Department) 's avoidance of designing, crafting, and actualizing the language by the Deaf community. No authority was given to them, even though this would later become their native language.

== Demissionization ==
Approximately 70% of the signs used in Eritrean Sign Language (EriSL) are identical to those found in Finnish Sign Language. This overlap is largely a result of the influence of Finnish and Swedish missionaries who were instrumental in the early development of deaf education in Eritrea. However, since 2005, the Eritrean National Association of the Deaf has been actively working to remove Finnish and Swedish signs that do not align with Eritrean cultural expressions or vernacular usage.

In their place, the Association has been incorporating indigenous village signs, gestures, and expressions that are rooted in the everyday communication of local Deaf communities.

This intentional effort signifies a process of "demissionizing" EriSL, which entails removing missionary influence to restore linguistic ownership and autonomy. It emphasizes the distinct cultural and national identity of Eritrea, setting it apart from the Nordic origins of the earlier sign systems. The initiative highlights how Deaf identity is not monolithic ("Deaf-same") but shaped by unique cultural and historical contexts.

As part of this process, the Eritrean Deaf community has also been working on creating a new version of sign encyclopedia, a more culturally grounded one. A dictionary that reflects Eritrean values, traditions, and lived experiences, and serves not only as a linguistic resource but also as a symbol of cultural affirmation and self-determination.

== Sociocultural Perspectives and Linguistic Ideologies ==
=== Pre-Demissionization: ===
Prior to the demissionization process, Eritrean Sign Language was heavily influenced by many factors, such as globalization, Swedish and Finnish linguistic imperialism during the era of missionization, and oralist methodologies. When missionaries arrived in 1955, they had to employ their own language modalities and signs because they didn't have the educational resources or documents of Eritrean indigenous signs to be able to support the communities’ understanding, prior to the EriSL Dictionary being published in 2012 with the intention of purifying Eritrean signs and initiating the demissionization process.

Alongside colonial signs and gestures, the d/Deaf community was also influenced by oralist methodology provided by the foreign missionaries and teachers.

Globalization is another factor that plays a role within the deaf communities of Eritrea, bringing about modernity that impacts on the Deaf community's rural and urban factions, affecting not only their perspectives on their own deaf identity, but also their viewpoint on sign language. One aspect of globalization is the missionization of Eritrean sign language by the Swedish and Finnish missionaries; they are imposing their sign language onto the community that has an already developed, indigenous sign language.

=== Effects of Demissionization ===
Following the process of demissionization, though it is still an ongoing process, we see a shift in not only pedagogy and the signs themselves, but also a shift in the perspectives and ideologies within the d/Deaf Eritrean community.

There are varying perspectives and experiences in both the rural and urban communities, with the urban communities already exposed to sign language and the rural communities not feeling as confident and secure in their signing or their deafness because they feel that they can't keep up, whether it be due to different educational settings, access to resources, etc.

=== Cultural Attitudes & Linguistic Perspectives in Rural vs. Urban Eritrea and Within Sub-Saharan Africa ===
In Sub-Saharan Africa, there is a wide range of d/Deaf identities and diverse perspectives on deafness – most of which lead to increased isolation and marginalization of the deaf individuals and communities. The diversity of the perspectives of deafness and the diversity of language isn't limited to the whole of Sub-Saharan Africa, but is also significantly prevalent within Eritrea, particularly between the urban and rural deaf populations. Different settings (rural versus urban), with the included factor of globalization, produce different perspectives on demissionization and attempts at language purism.

Swedish Sign Language family tree

Old British Sign Language? (c. 1760–1900)
Swedish Sign Language (c. 1800–present)
Portuguese Sign Language (c. 1820–present)	Finnish Sign Language (c. 1850–present)
Cape Verdian Sign Language (c. 20th century–present)	Finland-Swedish Sign Language (c. 1850–present)	Eritrean Sign Language (c. 1950–present)
São Tomé and Príncipe Sign Language? (c. 21st century–present)

== Dr. Rezenet Moges-Riedel ==
Dr. Rezenet Tsegay Moges-Riedel is a deaf, American-Eritrean anthropologist, currently teaching as an assistant professor of American Sign Language and Deaf Culture at California State University Long Beach. Dr. Moges-Riedel began her ethnographic research in 2006; completed her Master's thesis on “Demissionization through Sign Language Dictionary-Making Process in Deaf Eritrean Community,” and received her master's degree in 2011. She received her EdD in Education and Leadership Policy Studies in 2017 from CSU Northridge. Her research focuses on the spread and documentation of language, linguistic imperialism and sign language contact, language ideology and language purism. She is fluent in EriSL, ASL and Irish Sign Language, and an expert on d/Deaf identity and Intersectionality. Throughout her academic career, she has taught many courses on sign language and Deaf culture, released many publications pertinent to her research, as well as professional interests, particularly pertaining to African Deaf communities and Deaf cultures. She has also given speeches and lectures at various universities and anthropological research symposiums around the world, including the U.S., Canada, London, Edinburgh, Brazil, Belgium, Germany, the Netherlands, Denmark, South Africa and Turkey.

Dr. Moges-Riedel's contribution to researching the Eritrean Deaf community and its sign language, as well as understanding the colonial, sociocultural and political influences that have shaped the language and experiences, is revolutionary to understanding more about them. The establishment of the Eritrean Deaf community, and its official form of communication are so relatively new, (so new that even Eritrean websites and resources still aren't entirely up to date yet) that Dr. Moges-Riedel's work has provided a significant foundation for further understanding and development, and her research is the primary source of information on Eritrean deaf communities and EriSL. Due to her focus, research interests and personal background, Dr. Moges-Riedel's research provides a diverse, yet comprehensive, perspective on Eritrean deaf culture and language shaped by both her ethnographic fieldwork and her personal experiences as a deaf, Eritrean, anthropologist.
