= Sign language =

Language that uses manual communication and body language to convey meaning

Sign languages (also known as signed languages) are languages that use the visual-manual modality to convey meaning rather than spoken words. They are expressed through manual articulation in combination with non-manual markers, and are full-fledged natural languages with their own grammar and lexicon. Sign languages are not universal and are usually not mutually intelligible, although there are similarities among different sign languages.

Wherever communities of deaf and hard of hearing people exist, sign languages have developed as a means of communication and form the core of local Deaf cultures. Although signing is used primarily by deaf and hard of hearing people, it is also used by hearing individuals, such as those with deaf family members including children of deaf adults (CODAs).

Sign languages are distinct from body language, a type of nonverbal communication. Linguists also distinguish natural sign languages from other systems that are precursors to them or derived from them, such as constructed manual codes for spoken languages, home sign, baby sign language, and signs used with non-human primates.

The number of sign languages worldwide is not precisely known. Each country generally has its own native sign language, and some have more than one. The 2021 edition of Ethnologue lists 150 sign languages, while the SIGN-HUB Atlas of Sign Language Structures lists over 200 and notes that there are more that have not yet been documented. As of 2021, Indo-Pakistani Sign Language is the most widely used sign language in the world, and Ethnologue ranks it as the 156th most spoken language in the world.

Some sign languages have obtained some form of legal recognition.

== History ==
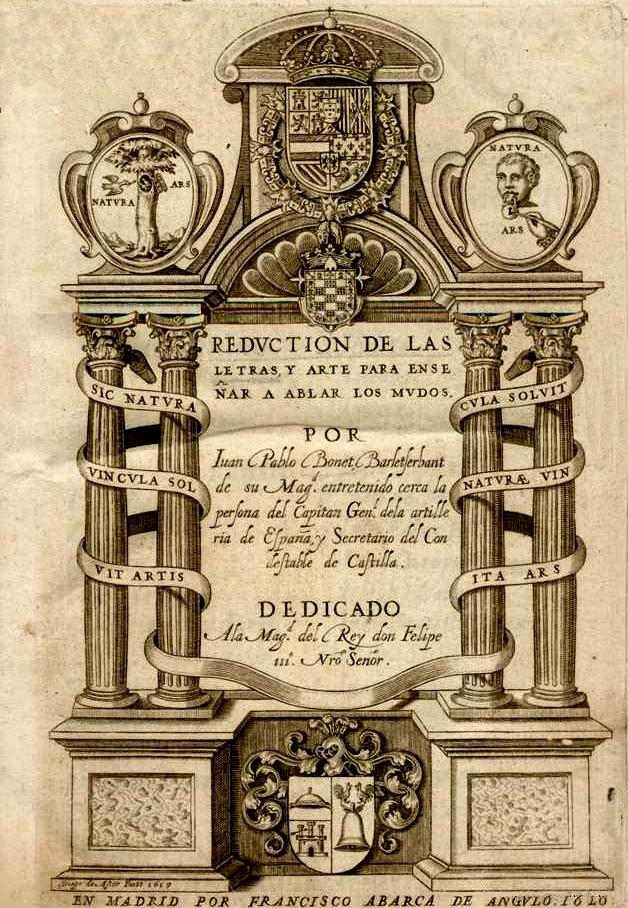
Juan Pablo Bonet, Reducción de las letras y arte para enseñar a hablar a los mudos ("Reduction of letters and art for teaching mute people to speak") (Madrid, 1620)

Groups of deaf people have used sign languages throughout history. One of the earliest written records of a sign language is from the fifth century BC, in Plato's Cratylus, where Socrates says: "If we hadn't a voice or a tongue, and wanted to express things to one another, wouldn't we try to make signs by moving our hands, head, and the rest of our body, just as dumb people do at present?" Most of what is known about pre-19th-century sign languages is limited to the manual alphabets (fingerspelling systems) that were invented to facilitate the transfer of words from a spoken language to a sign language, rather than documentation of the language itself.

Debate around European monastic sign languages developed in the Middle Ages has come to regard them as gestural systems rather than true sign languages. Monastic sign languages were the basis for the first known manual alphabet used in deaf schools, developed by Pedro Ponce de León.

The earliest records of contact between Europeans and Indigenous peoples of the Gulf Coast region in what is now Texas and northern Mexico note a fully formed sign language already in use by the time of the Europeans' arrival there. These records include the accounts of Cabeza de Vaca in 1527 and Coronado in 1541.

In 1620, Juan Pablo Bonet published Reducción de las letras y arte para enseñar a hablar a los mudos ('Reduction of letters and art for teaching mute people to speak') in Madrid. It is considered the first modern treatise of sign language phonetics, setting out a method of oral education for deaf people and a manual alphabet.

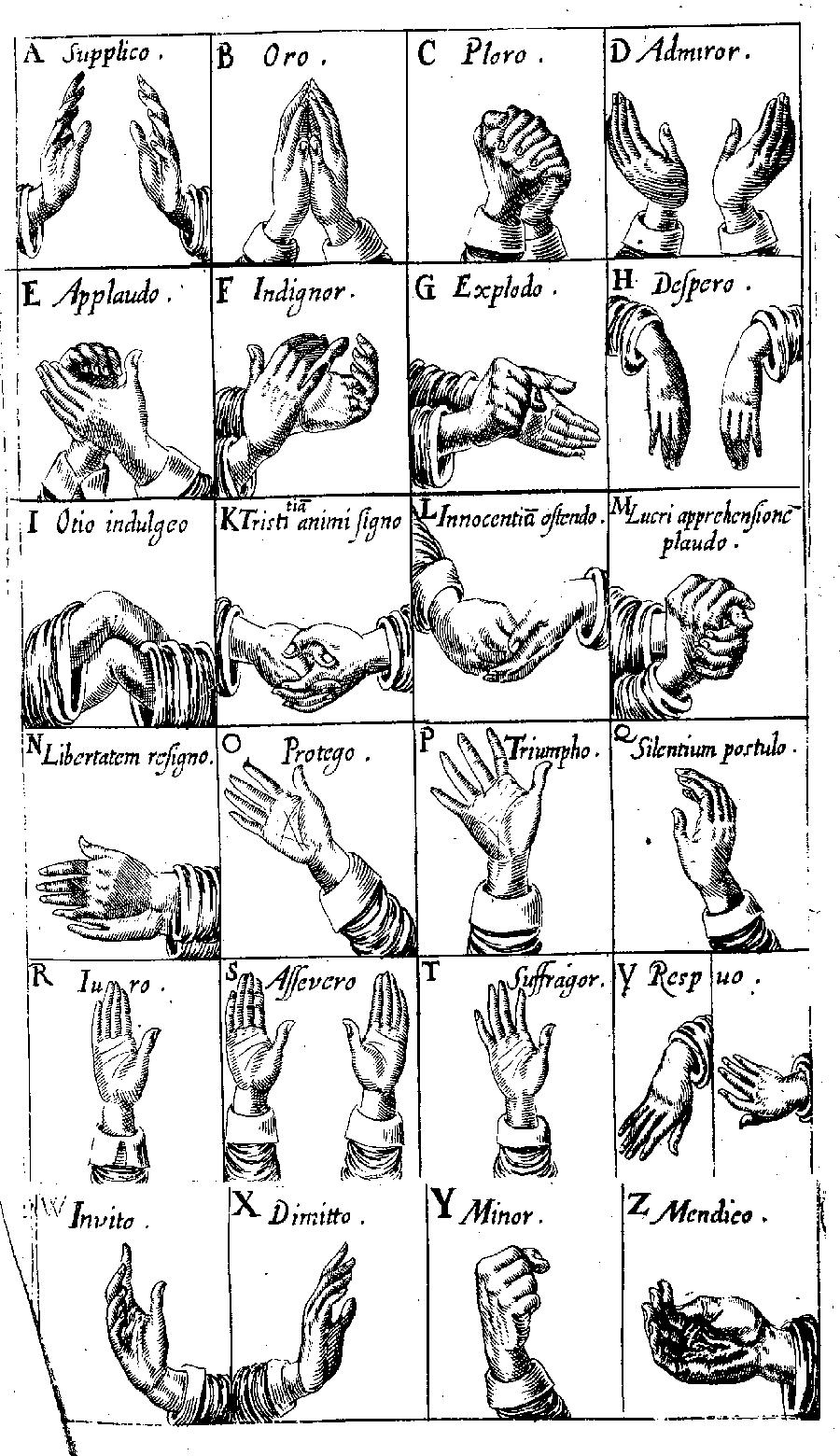
Chirogram from John Bulwer's Chirologia, 1644

In Britain, manual alphabets were also in use for a number of purposes, such as secret communication, public speaking, or communication by or with deaf people. In 1648, John Bulwer described "Master Babington", a deaf man proficient in the use of a manual alphabet, "contryved on the joynts of his fingers", whose wife could converse with him easily, even in the dark through the use of tactile signing.

In 1680, George Dalgarno published Didascalocophus, or, The deaf and dumb mans tutor, in which he presented his own method of deaf education, including an "arthrological" alphabet, where letters are indicated by pointing to different joints of the fingers and palm of the left hand. Arthrological systems had been in use by hearing people for some time; some have speculated that they can be traced to early Ogham manual alphabets.

The vowels of this alphabet have survived in the modern alphabets used in British Sign Language, Auslan and New Zealand Sign Language. The earliest known printed pictures of consonants of the modern two-handed alphabet appeared in 1698 with Digiti Lingua (Latin for Language [or Tongue] of the Finger), a pamphlet by an anonymous author who was himself unable to speak. He suggested that the manual alphabet could also be used by mutes, for silence and secrecy, or purely for entertainment. Nine of its letters can be traced to earlier alphabets, and 17 letters of the modern two-handed alphabet can be found among the two sets of 26 handshapes depicted.

Charles de La Fin published a book in 1692 describing an alphabetic system where pointing to a body part represented the first letter of the part (e.g. Brow=B), and vowels were located on the fingertips as with the other British systems. He described such codes for both English and Latin.

By 1720, the British manual alphabet had found more or less its present form. Descendants of this alphabet have been used by deaf communities, at least in education, in the former British colonies India, Australia, New Zealand, Uganda and South Africa, as well as the republics and provinces of the former Yugoslavia, Grand Cayman Island in the Caribbean, Indonesia, Norway, Germany and the United States.

During the Polygar Wars against the British, Veeran Sundaralingam communicated with Veerapandiya Kattabomman's mute younger brother, Oomaithurai, by using their own sign language.

Frenchman Charles-Michel de l'Épée published his manual alphabet in the 18th century, which has survived largely unchanged in France and North America until the present time. In 1755, Abbé de l'Épée founded the first school for deaf children in Paris; Laurent Clerc was arguably its most famous graduate. Clerc went to the United States with Thomas Hopkins Gallaudet to found the American School for the Deaf in Hartford, Connecticut, in 1817. Gallaudet's son, Edward Miner Gallaudet, founded a school for the deaf in 1857 in Washington, D.C., which in 1864 became the National Deaf-Mute College. Now called Gallaudet University, it is still the only liberal arts university for deaf people in the world.

Preservation of the Sign Language, George W. Veditz (1913)

International Sign, formerly known as Gestuno, is used mainly at international deaf events such as the Deaflympics and meetings of the World Federation of the Deaf. While recent studies claim that International Sign is a kind of a pidgin, they conclude that it is more complex than a typical pidgin and indeed is more like a full sign language.

== Linguistics ==
Sign languages have capability and complexity equal to spoken languages; their study as part of the field of linguistics has demonstrated that they exhibit the fundamental properties that exist in all languages. Such fundamental properties include duality of patterning and recursion. Duality of patterning means that languages are composed of smaller, meaningless units which can be combined into larger units with meaning (see below). The term recursion means that languages exhibit grammatical rules and the output of such a rule can be the input of the same rule. It is, for example, possible in sign languages to create subordinate clauses and a subordinate clause may contain another subordinate clause.

Sign languages are not mime—in other words, signs are conventional, often arbitrary and do not necessarily have a visual relationship to their referent, much as most spoken language is not onomatopoeic. While iconicity is more systematic and widespread in sign languages than in spoken ones, the difference is not categorical. The visual modality allows the human preference for close connections between form and meaning, to be more fully expressive, whereas this is more suppressed in spoken language.

Sign languages, like spoken languages, organize elementary, meaningless units into meaningful semantic units. This type of organization in natural language is often called duality of patterning. As in spoken languages, these meaningless units are represented as (combinations of) features, although coarser descriptions are often also made in terms of five "parameters": handshape (or handform), orientation, location (or place of articulation), movement, and non-manual expression. These meaningless units in sign languages were initially called cheremes, from the Greek word for hand, by analogy to the phonemes, from Greek for voice, of spoken languages. Now they are sometimes called phonemes when describing sign languages too, since the function is essentially the same, but more commonly discussed in terms of "features" or "parameters". More generally, both sign and spoken languages share the characteristics that linguists have found in all natural human languages, such as transitoriness, semanticity, arbitrariness, productivity, and cultural transmission.

Ghanaian Sign Language alphabet

Common linguistic features of many sign languages are the occurrence of classifier constructions, a high degree of inflection by means of changes of movement, and a topic-comment syntax. More than spoken languages, sign languages can convey meaning by simultaneous means, e.g. by the use of space, two manual articulators, and the signer's face and body. Though there is still much discussion on the topic of iconicity in sign languages, classifiers are generally considered to be highly iconic, as these complex constructions "function as predicates that may express any or all of the following: motion, position, stative-descriptive, or handling information". The term classifier is not used by everyone working on these constructions. Across the field of sign language linguistics the same constructions are also referred with other terms such as depictive signs.

Today, linguists study sign languages as true languages, part of the field of linguistics. However, the category "sign languages" was not added to the Linguistic Bibliography/Bibliographie Linguistique until the 1988 volume, when it appeared with 39 entries.

=== Relationships with spoken languages ===
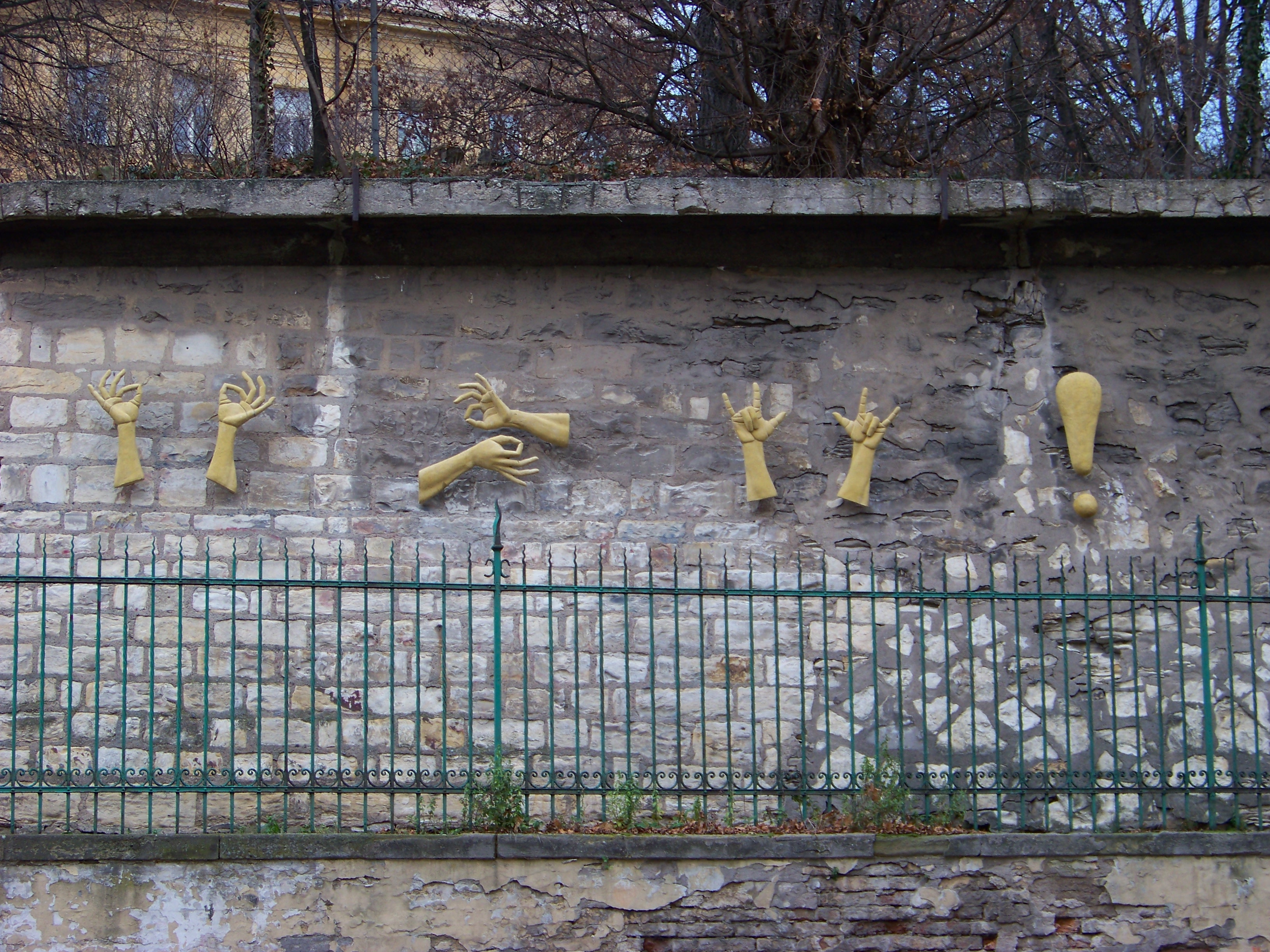
Sign language relief sculpture on a stone wall: "Life is beautiful, be happy and love each other", by Czech sculptor Zuzana Čížková on Holečkova Street in Prague-Smíchov, by a school for the deaf

There is a common misconception that sign languages are spoken language expressed in signs, or that they were invented by hearing people. Similarities in language processing in the brain between signed and spoken languages further perpetuated this misconception. Hearing teachers in deaf schools, such as Charles-Michel de l'Épée or Thomas Hopkins Gallaudet, are often incorrectly referred to as "inventors" of sign language. Instead, sign languages, like all natural languages, are developed by the people who use them, in this case, deaf people, who may have little or no knowledge of any spoken language.

As a sign language develops, it sometimes borrows elements from spoken languages, just as all languages borrow from other languages that they are in contact with. Sign languages vary in how much they borrow from spoken languages. In many sign languages, a manual alphabet ("fingerspelling") may be used in signed communication to borrow a word from a spoken language. This is most commonly used for proper names of people and places; it is also used in some languages for concepts for which no sign is available at that moment, particularly if the people involved are to some extent bilingual in the spoken language. Fingerspelling can sometimes be a source of new signs, such as initialized signs, in which the handshape represents the first letter of a spoken word with the same meaning.

A January 2021 Welsh Government video informing viewers of their new COVID-19 regulations

On the whole, though, sign languages are independent of spoken languages and follow their own paths of development. For example, British Sign Language (BSL) and American Sign Language (ASL) are quite different and mutually unintelligible, even though the hearing people of the United Kingdom and the United States share the same spoken language. The grammars of sign languages do not usually resemble those of spoken languages used in the same geographical area; in fact, in terms of syntax, ASL shares more with spoken Japanese than it does with English.

Similarly, countries which use a single spoken language throughout may have two or more sign languages, or an area that contains more than one spoken language might use only one sign language. South Africa, which has 11 official spoken languages and a similar number of other widely used spoken languages, is a good example of this. It has only one sign language with two variants due to its history of having two major educational institutions for the deaf which have served different geographic areas of the country.

=== Spatial grammar and simultaneity ===
Hello in ASL (American Sign Language)

Another variation of hello in ASL (American Sign Language)

Sign languages exploit the unique features of the visual medium (sight), but may also exploit tactile features (tactile sign languages). Spoken language is by and large linear; only one sound can be made or received at a time. Sign language, on the other hand, is visual and, hence, can use a simultaneous expression, although this is limited articulatorily and linguistically. Visual perception allows processing of simultaneous information.

One way in which many sign languages take advantage of the spatial nature of the language is through the use of classifiers. Classifiers allow a signer to spatially show a referent's type, size, shape, movement, or extent.

The possible simultaneity of sign languages in contrast to spoken languages is sometimes exaggerated. The use of two manual articulators is subject to motor constraints, resulting in a large extent of symmetry or signing with one articulator only. Further, sign languages, just like spoken languages, depend on linear sequencing of signs to form sentences; the greater use of simultaneity is mostly seen in the morphology (internal structure of individual signs).

=== Non-manual elements ===
Sign languages convey much of their prosody through non-manual elements. Postures or movements of the body, head, eyebrows, eyes, cheeks, and mouth are used in various combinations to show several categories of information, including lexical distinction, grammatical structure, adjectival or adverbial content, and discourse functions.

At the lexical level, signs can be lexically specified for non-manual elements in addition to the manual articulation. For instance, facial expressions may accompany verbs of emotion, as in the sign for angry in Czech Sign Language. Non-manual elements may also be lexically contrastive. For example, in ASL (American Sign Language), facial components distinguish some signs from other signs. An example is the sign translated as not yet, which requires that the tongue touch the lower lip and that the head rotate from side to side, in addition to the manual part of the sign. Without these features the sign would be interpreted as late. Mouthings, which are (parts of) spoken words accompanying lexical signs, can also be contrastive, as in the manually identical signs for doctor and battery in Sign Language of the Netherlands.

While the content of a signed sentence is produced manually, many grammatical functions are produced non-manually (i.e., with the face and the torso). Such functions include questions, negation, relative clauses and topicalization. ASL and BSL use similar non-manual marking for yes/no questions, for example. They are shown through raised eyebrows and a forward head tilt.

Some adjectival and adverbial information is conveyed through non-manual elements, but what these elements are varies from language to language. For instance, in ASL a slightly open mouth with the tongue relaxed and visible in the corner of the mouth means "carelessly", but a similar non-manual in BSL means "boring" or "unpleasant".

Discourse functions such as turn taking are largely regulated through head movement and eye gaze. Since the addressee in a signed conversation must be watching the signer, a signer can avoid letting the other person have a turn by not looking at them, or can indicate that the other person may have a turn by making eye contact.

=== Iconicity ===
Iconicity is similarity or analogy between the form of a sign (linguistic or otherwise) and its meaning, as opposed to arbitrariness. The first studies on iconicity in ASL were published in the late 1970s and early 1980s. Many early sign language linguists rejected the notion that iconicity was an important aspect of sign languages, considering most perceived iconicity to be extralinguistic. However, mimetic aspects of sign language (signs that imitate, mimic, or represent) are found in abundance across a wide variety of sign languages. For example, when deaf children learning sign language try to express something but do not know the associated sign, they will often invent an iconic sign that displays mimetic properties. Though it never disappears from a particular sign language, iconicity is gradually weakened as forms of sign languages become more customary and are subsequently grammaticized. As a form becomes more conventional, it becomes disseminated in a methodical way phonologically to the rest of the sign language community. Nancy Frishberg concluded that though originally present in many signs, iconicity is degraded over time through the application of natural grammatical processes.

In 1978, psychologist Roger Brown was one of the first to suggest that the properties of ASL give it a clear advantage in terms of learning and memory. In his study, Brown found that when a group of six hearing children were taught signs that had high levels of iconic mapping they were significantly more likely to recall the signs in a later memory task than another group of six children that were taught signs that had little or no iconic properties. In contrast to Brown, linguists Elissa Newport and Richard Meier found that iconicity "appears to have virtually no impact on the acquisition of American Sign Language".

A central task for the pioneers of sign language linguistics was trying to prove that ASL was a real language and not merely a collection of gestures or "English on the hands". One of the prevailing beliefs at this time was that "real languages" must consist of an arbitrary relationship between form and meaning. Thus, if ASL consisted of signs that had iconic form-meaning relationship, it could not be considered a real language. As a result, iconicity as a whole was largely neglected in research of sign languages for a long time. However, iconicity also plays a role in many spoken languages. Spoken Japanese for example exhibits many words mimicking the sounds of their potential referents (see Japanese sound symbolism). Later researchers, thus, acknowledged that natural languages do not need to consist of an arbitrary relationship between form and meaning. The visual nature of sign language simply allows for a greater degree of iconicity compared to spoken languages as most real-world objects can be described by a prototypical shape (e.g., a table usually has a flat surface), but most real-world objects do not make prototypical sounds that can be mimicked by spoken languages (e.g., tables do not make prototypical sounds). However, sign languages are not fully iconic. On the one hand, there are also many arbitrary signs in sign languages and, on the other hand, the grammar of a sign language puts limits to the degree of iconicity: All known sign languages, for example, express lexical concepts via manual signs. From a truly iconic language one would expect that a concept like smiling would be expressed by mimicking a smile (i.e., by performing a smiling face). All known sign languages, however, do not express the concept of smiling by a smiling face, but by a manual sign.

The cognitive linguistics perspective rejects a more traditional definition of iconicity as a relationship between linguistic form and a concrete, real-world referent. Rather it is a set of selected correspondences between the form and meaning of a sign. In this view, iconicity is grounded in a language user's mental representation ("construal" in cognitive grammar). It is defined as a fully grammatical and central aspect of a sign language rather than a peripheral phenomenon.

The cognitive linguistics perspective allows for some signs to be fully iconic or partially iconic given the number of correspondences between the possible parameters of form and meaning. In this way, the Israeli Sign Language (ISL) sign for ask has parts of its form that are iconic ("movement away from the mouth" means "something coming from the mouth"), and parts that are arbitrary (the handshape, and the orientation).

Many signs have metaphoric mappings as well as iconic or metonymic ones. For these signs there are three-way correspondences between a form, a concrete source and an abstract target meaning. The ASL sign LEARN has this three-way correspondence. The abstract target meaning is "learning". The concrete source is putting objects into the head from books. The form is a grasping hand moving from an open palm to the forehead. The iconic correspondence is between form and concrete source. The metaphorical correspondence is between concrete source and abstract target meaning. Because the concrete source is connected to two correspondences linguistics refer to metaphorical signs as "double mapped".

=== Typology ===
Sign languages vary in word-order typology. For example, Austrian Sign Language, Japanese Sign Language and Indo-Pakistani Sign Language are Subject-object-verb while ASL is Subject-verb-object. Influence from the surrounding spoken languages is plausible.

Sign languages tend to be incorporating classifier languages, where a classifier handshape representing the object is incorporated into those transitive verbs which allow such modification. For a similar group of intransitive verbs (especially motion verbs), it is the subject which is incorporated. Only in a very few sign languages (for instance Japanese Sign Language) are agents ever incorporated. In this way, since subjects of intransitives are treated similarly to objects of transitives, incorporation in sign languages can be said to follow an ergative pattern.

Brentari classifies sign languages as a whole group determined by the medium of communication (visual instead of auditory) as one group with the features monosyllabic and polymorphemic. That means, that one syllable (i.e. one word, one sign) can express several morphemes, e.g., subject and object of a verb determine the direction of the verb's movement (inflection).

Another aspect of typology that has been studied in sign languages is their systems for cardinal numbers. Typologically significant differences have been found between sign languages.

=== Acquisition ===
Children who are exposed to a sign language from birth will acquire it, just as hearing children acquire their native spoken language. Researchers at the McGill University found that American Sign Language users who acquired the language natively (from birth) performed better when asked to copy videos of ASL sentences than ASL users who acquired the language later in life. They also found that there are differences in the grammatical morphology of ASL sentences between the two groups, all suggesting that there is an important critical period in learning signed languages.

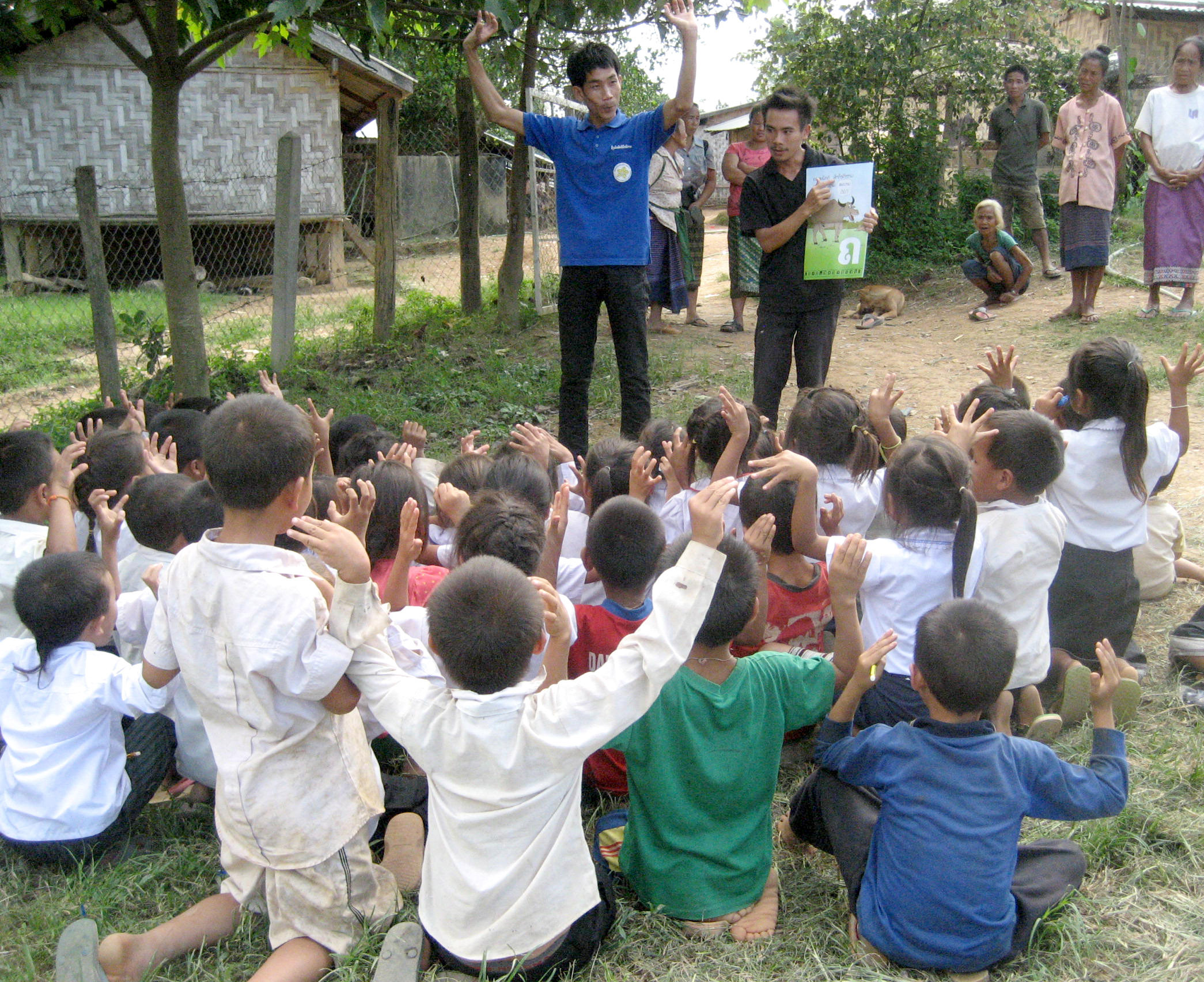
Young students learn some words of Lao sign language from Suliphone, a deaf artist. This was one of several activities at a school book party sponsored by Big Brother Mouse, a literacy project in Laos where Suliphone works.

The acquisition of non-manual features follows an interesting pattern: When a word that always has a particular non-manual feature associated with it (such as a wh-question word) is learned, the non-manual aspects are attached to the word but do not have the flexibility associated with adult use. At a certain point, the non-manual features are dropped and the word is produced with no facial expression. After a few months, the non-manuals reappear, this time being used the way adult signers would use them.

=== Written forms ===
Sign languages do not have a traditional or formal written form. Many deaf people do not see a need to write their own language.

Several ways to represent sign languages in written form have been developed.

- Stokoe notation, devised by Dr. William Stokoe for his 1965 Dictionary of American Sign Language, is an abstract phonemic notation system. Designed specifically for representing the use of the hands, it has no way of expressing facial expression or other non-manual features of sign languages. However, it was designed for research, particularly in a dictionary, not for general use.
- The Hamburg Notation System (HamNoSys), developed in the early 1990s, is a detailed phonetic system, not designed for any one sign language, and intended as a transcription system for researchers rather than as a practical script.
- David J. Peterson has attempted to create a phonetic transcription system for signing that is ASCII-friendly known as the Sign Language International Phonetic Alphabet (SLIPA).
- SignWriting, developed by Valerie Sutton in 1974, is a system for representing sign languages phonetically (including mouthing, facial expression and dynamics of movement). The script is sometimes used for detailed research, language documentation, as well as publishing texts and works in sign languages.
- si5s is another orthography which is largely phonemic. However, a few signs are logographs and/or ideographs due to regional variation in sign languages.
- ASL-phabet is a system designed primarily for education of deaf children by Dr. Sam Supalla which uses a minimalist collection of symbols in the order of Handshape-Location-Movement. Many signs can be written the same way (homograph).
- The Alphabetic Writing System for sign languages (Sistema de escritura alfabética, SEA, by its Spanish name and acronym), developed by linguist Ángel Herrero Blanco and two deaf researchers, Juan José Alfaro and Inmacualada Cascales, was published as a book in 2003 and made accessible in Spanish Sign Language on-line. This system makes use of the letters of the Latin alphabet with a few diacritics to represent sign through the morphemic sequence S L C Q D F (bimanual sign, place, contact, handshape, direction and internal form). The resulting words are meant to be read by signing. The system is designed to be applicable to any sign language with minimal modification and to be usable through any medium without special equipment or software. Non-manual elements can be encoded to some extent, but the authors argue that the system does not need to represent all elements of a sign to be practical, the same way written oral language does not. The system has seen some updates which are kept publicly on a wiki page. The Center for Linguistic Normalization of Spanish Sign Language has made use of SEA to transcribe all signs on its dictionary.

So far, there is no consensus regarding the written form of sign language. Maria Galea writes that SignWriting "is becoming widespread, uncontainable and untraceable. In the same way that works written in and about a well developed writing system such as the Latin script, the time has arrived where SW is so widespread, that it is impossible in the same way to list all works that have been produced using this writing system and that have been written about this writing system." For example, in 2015 at the Federal University of Santa Catarina, João Paulo Ampessan wrote his linguistics master's dissertation in Brazilian Sign Language using Sutton SignWriting. In his dissertation, "The Writing of Grammatical Non-Manual Expressions in Sentences in LIBRAS Using the SignWriting System", Ampessan states that "the data indicate the need for [non-manual expressions] usage in writing sign language". Except for SignWriting, none are widely used.

=== Sign perception ===
For a native signer, sign perception influences how the mind makes sense of their visual language experience. For example, a handshape may vary based on the other signs made before or after it, but these variations are arranged in perceptual categories during its development. The mind detects handshape contrasts but groups similar handshapes together in one category. Different handshapes are stored in other categories. The mind ignores some of the similarities between different perceptual categories, at the same time preserving the visual information within each perceptual category of handshape variation.

== Classification ==
The classification of sign language families French Sign Language family →American Sign Language (ASL) cluster →Russian Sign Language cluster →Czech Sign Language cluster Danish Sign Language family Swedish Sign Language family German Sign Language family Vietnamese sign languages & some Thai and Lao SLs Arab sign-language family Indo-Pakistani Sign Language Chinese Sign Language Japanese Sign Language family BANZSL family (British, Australian and New Zealand Sign Language) →South African Sign Language (within the BANZSL family) Isolated languages No data

Sign languages may be classified by how they arise.

In non-signing communities, home sign is not a full language, but closer to a pidgin. Home sign is amorphous and generally idiosyncratic to a particular family, where a deaf child does not have contact with other deaf children and is not educated in sign. Such systems are not generally passed on from one generation to the next. Where they are passed on, creolization would be expected to occur, resulting in a full language. However, home sign may also be closer to full language in communities where the hearing population has a gestural mode of language; examples include various Australian Aboriginal sign languages and gestural systems across West Africa, such as Mofu-Gudur in Cameroon.

A village sign language is a local indigenous language that typically arises over several generations in a relatively insular community with a high incidence of deafness, and is used both by the deaf and by a significant portion of the hearing community, who have deaf family and friends. The most famous of these is probably the extinct Martha's Vineyard Sign Language of the U.S., but there are also numerous village languages scattered throughout Africa, Asia, and America.

Deaf-community sign languages, on the other hand, arise where deaf people come together to form their own communities. These include school sign, such as Nicaraguan Sign Language, which develop in the student bodies of deaf schools which do not use sign as a language of instruction, as well as community languages such as Bamako Sign Language, which arise where generally uneducated deaf people congregate in urban centers for employment. At first, Deaf-community sign languages are not generally known by the hearing population, in many cases not even by close family members. However, they may grow, in some cases becoming a language of instruction and receiving official recognition, as in the case of ASL.

Both contrast with speech-taboo languages such as the various Aboriginal Australian sign languages, which are developed by the hearing community and only used secondarily by the deaf. It is doubtful whether most of these are languages in their own right, rather than manual codes of spoken languages, though a few such as Yolngu Sign Language are independent of any particular spoken language. Hearing people may also develop sign to communicate with users of other languages, as in Plains Indian Sign Language; this was a contact signing system or pidgin that was evidently not used by deaf people in the Plains nations, though it presumably influenced home sign.

Language contact and creolization is common in the development of sign languages, making clear family classifications difficult– it is often unclear whether lexical similarity is due to borrowing or a common parent language, or whether there was one or several parent languages, such as several village languages merging into a Deaf-community language. Contact occurs between sign languages, between sign and spoken languages (contact sign, a kind of pidgin), and between sign languages and gestural systems used by the broader community. For example, Adamorobe Sign Language, a village sign language of Ghana, may be related to the "gestural trade jargon used in the markets throughout West Africa", in vocabulary and areal features including prosody and phonetics.

- BSL, Auslan and NZSL are usually loosely considered to be part of the language group known as BANZSL. Maritime Sign Language and South African Sign Language are also related to BSL.
- Danish Sign Language and its descendants Norwegian Sign Language and Icelandic Sign Language are largely mutually intelligible with Swedish Sign Language. Finnish Sign Language and Portuguese Sign Language derive from Swedish SL, though with local admixture in the case of mutually unintelligible Finnish SL. Danish SL has French SL influence and Wittmann (1991) places them in that family, though he proposes that Swedish, Finnish, and Portuguese SL are instead related to British Sign Language.
- Swedish Sign Language Family includes the following languages: Swedish Sign Language, Finnish Sign Language, Finland-Swedish Sign Language, Portuguese Sign Language, Eritrean Sign Language and the Cape Verdian Sign Language, although some reports also say that the São Tomé and Príncipe Sign Language is largely intelligible with Portuguese Sign.
- Indian Sign Language (ISL) is similar to Pakistani Sign Language.
- Japanese Sign Language, Taiwanese Sign Language and Korean Sign Language are thought to be members of a Japanese Sign Language family.
- French Sign Language family. There are a number of sign languages that emerged from French Sign Language (LSF), or are the result of language contact between local community sign languages and LSF. These include: French Sign Language, Italian Sign Language, Quebec Sign Language (LSQ), American Sign Language, Irish Sign Language, Russian Sign Language, Dutch Sign Language (NGT), Spanish Sign Language, Mexican Sign Language, Brazilian Sign Language (LIBRAS), Catalan Sign Language, Ukrainian Sign Language, Austrian Sign Language (along with its twin Hungarian Sign Language and its offspring Czech Sign Language) and others.
  - A subset of this group includes languages that have been heavily influenced by American Sign Language (ASL), or are regional varieties of ASL. Bolivian Sign Language is sometimes considered a dialect of ASL. Thai Sign Language is a mixed language derived from ASL and the native sign languages of Bangkok and Chiang Mai, and may be considered part of the ASL family. Others possibly influenced by ASL include Ugandan Sign Language, Kenyan Sign Language, Philippine Sign Language and Malaysian Sign Language.
  - According to an SIL report, the sign languages of Russia, Moldova and Ukraine share a high degree of lexical similarity and may be dialects of one language, or distinct related languages. The same report suggested a "cluster" of sign languages centered around Czech Sign Language, Hungarian Sign Language and Slovak Sign Language. This group may also include Romanian, Bulgarian, and Polish sign languages.
- German Sign Language (DGS) gave rise to Polish Sign Language; it also at least strongly influenced Israeli Sign Language, though it is unclear whether the latter derives from DGS or from Austrian Sign Language, which is in the French family.
- The southern dialect of Chinese Sign Language gave rise to Hong Kong Sign Language, used in Hong Kong and Macau
- Lyons Sign Language may be the source of Flemish Sign Language (VGT) though this is unclear.
- Sign languages of Jordan, Lebanon, Syria, Palestine, and Iraq (and possibly Saudi Arabia) may be part of a sprachbund, or may be one dialect of a larger Eastern Arabic Sign Language.
- Known isolates include Nicaraguan Sign Language, Turkish Sign Language, Armenian Sign Language, Kata Kolok, Al-Sayyid Bedouin Sign Language and Providence Island Sign Language.

The only comprehensive classification along these lines going beyond a simple listing of languages dates back to 1991. The classification is based on the 69 sign languages from the 1988 edition of Ethnologue that were known at the time of the 1989 conference on sign languages in Montreal and 11 more languages the author added after the conference. (Note: Wittmann's classification went into Ethnologue's database where it is still cited. The subsequent edition of Ethnologue in 1992 went up to 81 sign languages, ultimately adopting Wittmann's distinction between primary and alternate sign languages (going back ultimately to Stokoe 1974) and, more vaguely, some other traits from his analysis. The 2013 version (17th edition) of Ethnologue is now up to 137 sign languages.)

Wittmann classification of sign languages
	Primary language	Primary group	Auxiliary language	Auxiliary group
Prototype-A	5	1	7	2
Prototype-R	18	1	1	–
BSL-derived	8	–	–	–
DGS-derived	1 or 2	–	–	–
JSL-derived	2	–	–	–
LSF-derived	30	–	–	–
LSG-derived	1?	–	–	–

In his classification, the author distinguishes between primary and auxiliary sign languages as well as between single languages and names that are thought to refer to more than one language. The prototype-A class of languages includes all those sign languages that seemingly cannot be derived from any other language. Prototype-R languages are languages that are remotely modelled on a prototype-A language (in many cases thought to have been French Sign Language) by a process Kroeber (1940) called "stimulus diffusion". The families of BSL, DGS, JSL, LSF (and possibly LSG) were the products of creolization and relexification of prototype languages. Creolization is seen as enriching overt morphology in sign languages, as compared to reducing overt morphology in spoken languages.

=== Use of sign languages in hearing communities ===
On occasion, where the prevalence of deaf people is high enough, a deaf sign language has been taken up by an entire local community, forming what is sometimes called a "village sign language" or "shared signing community". Typically this happens in small, tightly integrated communities with a closed gene pool. Famous examples include:

- Martha's Vineyard Sign Language, United States
- Al-Sayyid Bedouin Sign Language, Israel
- Kata Kolok, Bali
- Adamorobe Sign Language, Ghana
- Yucatec Maya Sign Language, Mexico

In such communities deaf people are generally well-integrated in the general community and not socially disadvantaged, so much so that it is difficult to speak of a separate "Deaf" community.

Many Australian Aboriginal sign languages arose in a context of extensive speech taboos, such as during mourning and initiation rites. They are or were especially highly developed among the Warlpiri, Warumungu, Dieri, Kaytetye, Arrernte, and Warlmanpa, and are based on their respective spoken languages.

A sign language arose among tribes of American Indians in the Great Plains region of North America (see Plains Indian Sign Language) before European contact. It was used by hearing people to communicate among tribes with different spoken languages, as well as by deaf people. There are especially users today among the Crow, Cheyenne, and Arapaho.

Sign language is also used as a form of alternative or augmentative communication by people who can hear but have difficulties using their voices to speak.

Increasingly, hearing schools and universities are expressing interest in incorporating sign language. In the U.S., enrollment for ASL (American Sign Language) classes as part of students' choice of second language is on the rise. In New Zealand, one year after the passing of NZSL Act 2006 in parliament, a NZSL curriculum was released for schools to take NZSL as an optional subject. The curriculum and teaching materials were designed to target intermediate schools from Years 7 to 10, (NZ Herald, 2007).

=== Language endangerment and extinction ===
As with any spoken language, sign languages are also vulnerable to becoming endangered. For example, a sign language used by a small community may be endangered and even abandoned as users shift to a sign language used by a larger community, as has happened with Hawaiʻi Sign Language, which is almost extinct except for a few elderly signers. Even nationally recognised sign languages can be endangered; for example, New Zealand Sign Language is losing users. Methods are being developed to assess the language vitality of sign languages.

Endangered sign languages

- Adamorobe Sign Language (AdaSL)
- Ban Khor Sign Language (BKSL)
- Benkala Sign Language (KK)
- Finland-Swedish Sign Language (FinSSL)
- Hawaiʻi Sign Language (HPSL)
- Inuit Sign Language (IUR)
- Jamaican Country Sign Language (KS)
- Maritime Sign Language (MSL)
- Old Bangkok Sign Language (OBSL)
- Old Chiangmai Sign Language (OCSL)
- Plains Indian Sign Language (PISL)
- Providencia Sign Language (PSL)

Extinct sign languages

- Angami Naga Sign Language
- Henniker Sign Language
- Martha's Vineyard Sign Language (MVSL)
- Old French Sign Language (VLSF)
- Old Kentish Sign Language (OKSL)
- Pitta Pitta sign language
- Plateau Sign Language
- Rennellese Sign Language (RSL)
- Sandy River Valley Sign Language
- Warluwarra sign language

== In society ==
=== Deaf communities and Deaf culture ===
When deaf people constitute a relatively small proportion of the general population, deaf communities often develop that are distinct from the surrounding hearing community. These deaf communities are very widespread in the world, associated especially with sign languages used in urban areas and throughout a nation, and the cultures they have developed are very rich.

One example of sign language variation in the deaf community is Black ASL. This sign language was developed in the black deaf community as a variant during the American era of segregation and racism, where young black deaf students were forced to attend separate schools than their white deaf peers.

=== Legal recognition ===
Some sign languages have obtained some form of legal recognition, while others have no status at all. Sarah Batterbury has argued that sign languages should be recognized and supported not merely as an accommodation for those with disabilities, but as the communication medium of language communities.

Legal requirements covering sign language accessibility in media vary from country to country. In the United Kingdom, the Broadcasting Act 1996 addressed the requirements for blind and deaf viewers, but has since been replaced by the Communications Act 2003.

=== Interpretation ===
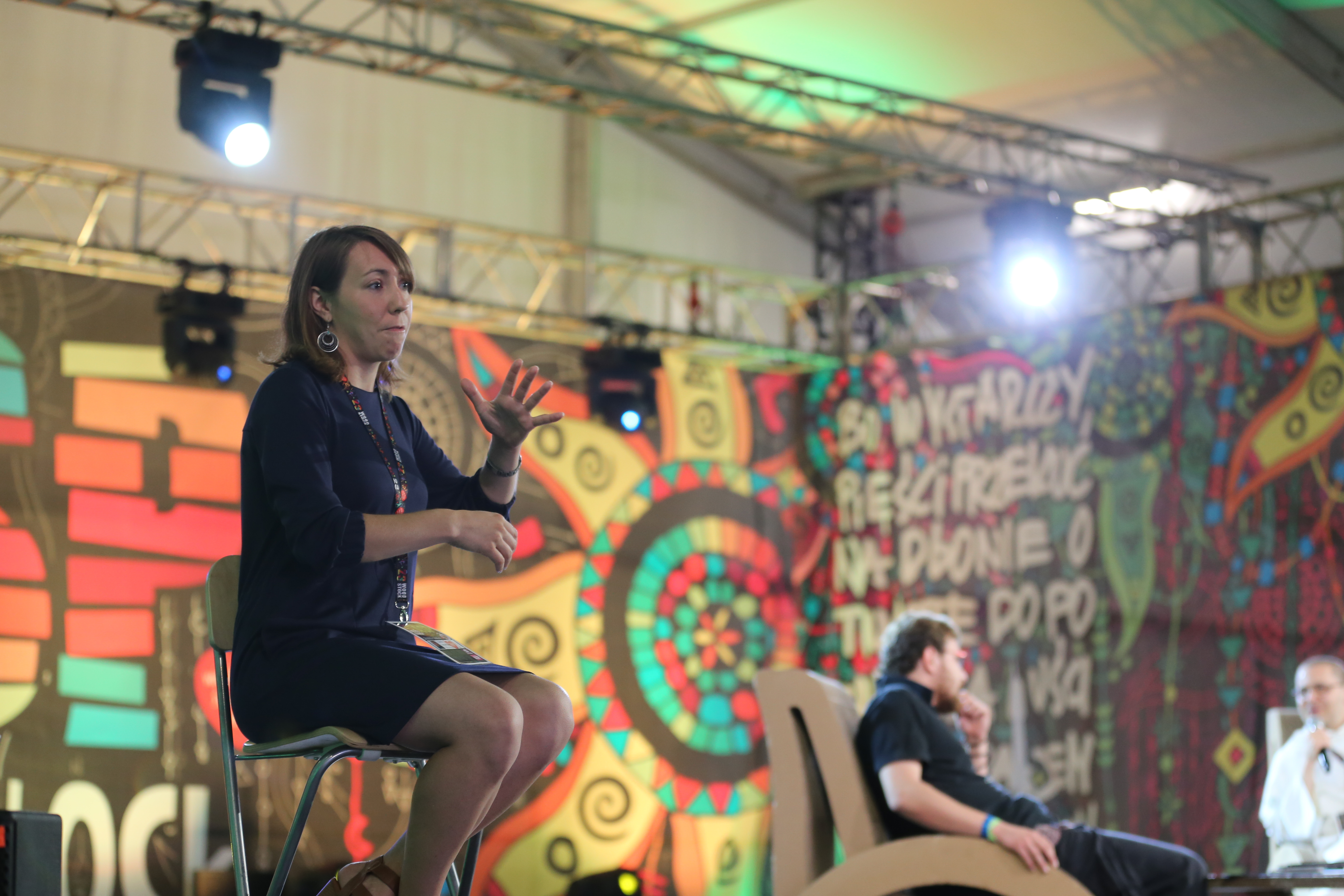
A Polish Sign Language interpreter at the Przystanek Woodstock in 2017

In order to facilitate communication between deaf and hearing people, sign language interpreters are often used. Such activities involve considerable effort on the part of the interpreter, since sign languages are distinct natural languages with their own syntax, different from any spoken language.

The interpretation flow is normally between a sign language and a spoken language that are customarily used in the same country, such as French Sign Language (LSF) and spoken French in France, Spanish Sign Language (LSE) to spoken Spanish in Spain, British Sign Language (BSL) and spoken English in the U.K., and American Sign Language (ASL) and spoken English in the U.S. and most of anglophone Canada (since BSL and ASL are distinct sign languages both used in English-speaking countries), etc. Sign language interpreters who can translate between signed and spoken languages that are not normally paired (such as between LSE and English), are also available, albeit less frequently.

Video about access to cultural institutions in Mexico, with Mexican Sign Language interpretation and captions in Spanish

Sign language is sometimes provided for television programmes that include speech. The signer usually appears in the bottom corner of the screen, with the programme being broadcast full size or slightly shrunk away from that corner. Typically for press conferences such as those given by the Mayor of New York City, the signer appears to stage left or right of the public official to allow both the speaker and signer to be in frame at the same time. Live sign interpretation of important televised events is increasingly common but still an informal industry In traditional analogue broadcasting, some programmes are repeated outside main viewing hours with a signer present. Some emerging television technologies allow the viewer to turn the signer on and off in a similar manner to subtitles and closed captioning.

=== Technology ===
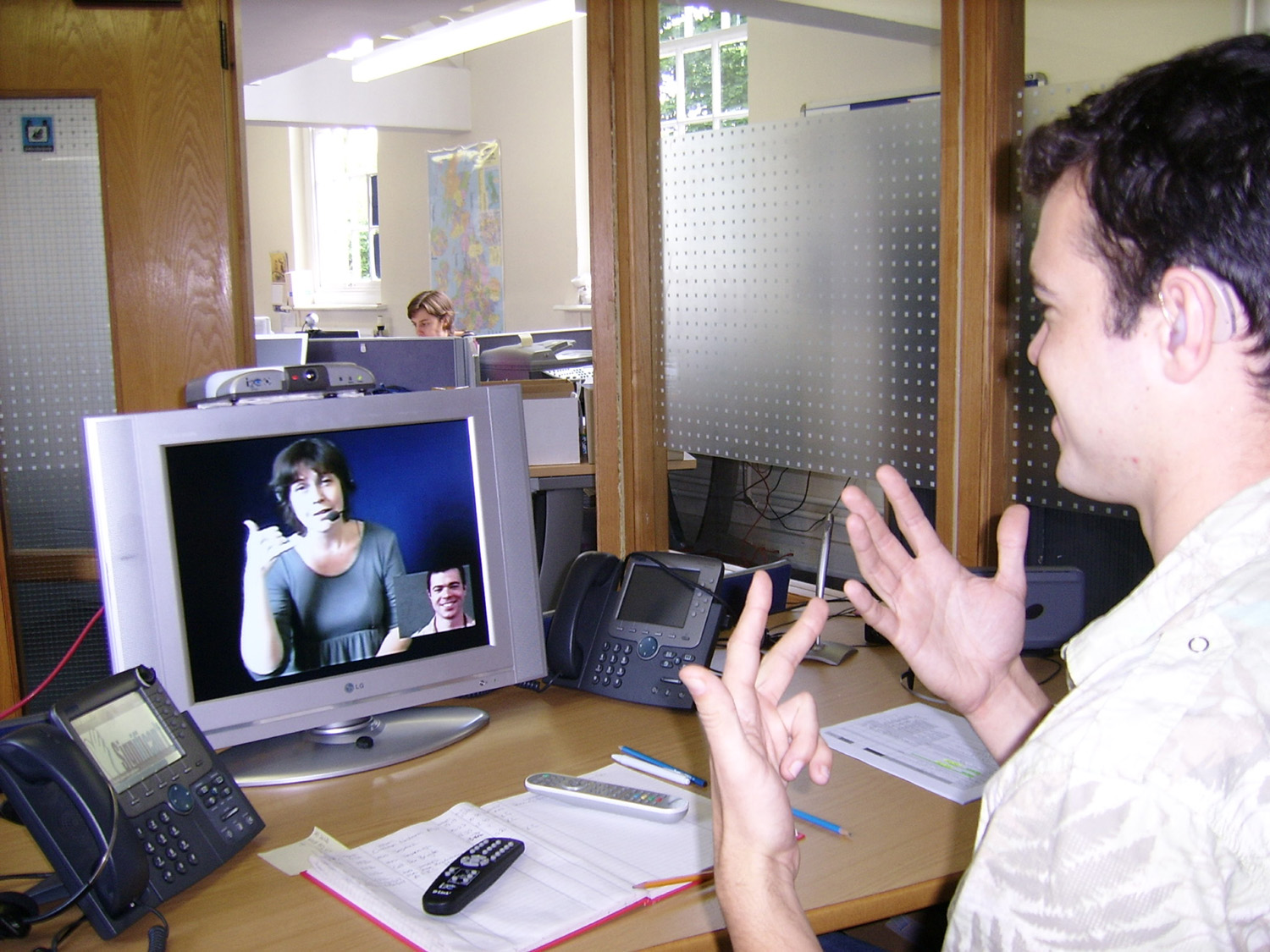
A deaf person using a remote VRS interpreter to communicate with a hearing person

One of the first demonstrations of the ability for telecommunications to help sign language users communicate with each other occurred when AT&T's videophone (trademarked as the Picturephone) was introduced to the public at the 1964 New York World's Fair– two deaf users were able to freely communicate with each other between the fair and another city. However, video communication did not become widely available until sufficient bandwidth for the high volume of video data became available in the early 2000s.

The Internet now allows deaf people to talk via a video link, either with a special-purpose videophone designed for use with sign language or with "off-the-shelf" video services designed for use with broadband and an ordinary computer webcam. The special videophones that are designed for sign language communication may provide better quality than 'off-the-shelf' services and may use data compression methods specifically designed to maximize the intelligibility of sign languages. Some advanced equipment enables a person to remotely control the other person's video camera, in order to zoom in and out or to point the camera better to understand the signing.

Video interpreter sign used at VRS/VRI service locations

Interpreters may be physically present with both parties to the conversation but, since the technological advancements in the early 2000s, provision of interpreters in remote locations has become available. In video remote interpreting (VRI), the two clients (a sign language user and a hearing person who wish to communicate with each other) are in one location, and the interpreter is in another. The interpreter communicates with the sign language user via a video telecommunications link, and with the hearing person by an audio link. VRI can be used for situations in which no on-site interpreters are available.

However, VRI cannot be used for situations in which all parties are speaking via telephone alone. With video relay service (VRS), the sign language user, the interpreter, and the hearing person are in three separate locations, thus allowing the two clients to talk to each other on the phone through the interpreter.

With recent developments in artificial intelligence in computer science, some recent deep learning based machine translation algorithms have been developed which automatically translate short videos containing sign language directly to written language.

Sign language has been incorporated into film; for example, all movies shown in Brazilian movie theaters must have a Brazilian Sign Language video track available to play alongside the film via a second screen.

=== Sign Union flag ===
The Sign Union flag

The Sign Union flag or the Deaf flag was designed by Arnaud Balard. After studying flags around the world and vexillology principles for two years, Balard revealed the design of the flag, featuring the stylized outline of a hand. The three colors which make up the flag design are representative of Deafhood and humanity (dark blue), sign language (turquoise), and enlightenment and hope (yellow). Balard intended the flag to be an international symbol which welcomes deaf people.

== Communication systems similar to sign language ==
There are a number of communication systems that are similar in some respects to sign languages, while not having all the characteristics of a full sign language, particularly its grammatical structure. Many of these are either precursors to natural sign languages or are derived from them.

=== Manual codes for spoken languages ===
When Deaf and Hearing people interact, signing systems may be developed that use signs drawn from a natural sign language but used according to the grammar of the spoken language. In particular, when people devise one-for-one sign-for-word correspondences between spoken words (or even morphemes) and signs that represent them, the system that results is a manual code for a spoken language, rather than a natural sign language. Such systems may be invented in an attempt to help teach Deaf children the spoken language, and generally are not used outside an educational context.

=== "Baby sign language" with hearing children ===
Some hearing parents teach signs to young hearing children. Since the muscles in babies' hands grow and develop quicker than their mouths, signs are seen as a beneficial option for better communication. Babies can usually produce signs before they can speak. This reduces the confusion between parents when trying to figure out what their child wants. When the child begins to speak, signing is usually abandoned, so the child does not progress to acquiring the grammar of the sign language.

This is in contrast to hearing children who grow up with Deaf parents, who generally acquire the full sign language natively, the same as Deaf children of Deaf parents.

=== Home sign ===
Informal, rudimentary sign systems are sometimes developed within a single family. For instance, when hearing parents with no sign language skills have a deaf child, the child may develop a system of signs naturally, unless repressed by the parents. The term for these mini-languages is home sign (sometimes "kitchen sign").

Home sign arises due to the absence of any other way to communicate. Within the span of a single lifetime and without the support or feedback of a community, the child naturally invents signs to help meet their communication needs, and may even develop a few grammatical rules for combining short sequences of signs. Still, this kind of system is inadequate for the intellectual development of a child and it comes nowhere near meeting the standards linguists use to describe a complete language. No type of home sign is recognized as a full language.

=== Primate use ===
There have been several notable examples of scientists teaching signs to non-human primates in order to communicate with humans, such as chimpanzees, gorillas and orangutans. However, linguists generally point out that this does not constitute knowledge of a human language as a complete system, rather than simply signs/words. Notable examples of animals who have learned signs include:

- Chimpanzees: Washoe, Nim Chimpsky and Loulis
- Gorillas: Koko and Michael

=== Gestural theory of human language origins ===
One theory of the evolution of human language states that it developed first as a gestural system, which later shifted to speech. An important question for this gestural theory is what caused the shift to vocalization.

== See also ==
- Animal language
- Body language
- Braille
- Chereme
- Chinese number gestures
- Cued speech
- Fingerspelling
- Legal recognition of sign languages
- List of international common standards
- Machine translation of sign languages
- Manual communication
- Modern Sign Language communication
- Origin of language
- Origin of speech
- Sign language glove
- Sign language in infants and toddlers
- Sign language media
- Sign name
- Sociolinguistics of sign languages
- Tactile signing

== Bibliography ==
- Aronoff, Mark; Meir, Irit; Sandler, Wendy (2005). "The Paradox of Sign Language Morphology". Language. 81 (2): 301–44. doi:10.1353/lan.2005.0043. PMC 3250214. PMID 22223926.
- Branson, J., D. Miller, & I G. Marsaja. (1996). "Everyone here speaks sign language, too: a deaf village in Bali, Indonesia". In: C. Lucas (ed.): Multicultural aspects of sociolinguistics in deaf communities. Washington, Gallaudet University Press, pp. 39+
- Deuchar, Margaret (1987). "Sign languages as creoles and Chomsky's notion of Universal Grammar". Essays in honor of Noam Chomsky, 81–91. New York: Falmer.
- Emmorey, Karen; & Lane, Harlan L. (Eds.). (2000). The signs of language revisited: An anthology to honor Ursula Bellugi and Edward Klima. Mahwah, N.J.: Lawrence Erlbaum Associates. ISBN 0-8058-3246-7.
- Fischer, Susan D. (1974). "Sign language and linguistic universals". Actes du Colloque franco-allemand de grammaire générative, 2.187–204. Tübingen: Niemeyer.
- Fischer, Susan D. (1978). "Sign languages and creoles". Siple. 1978: 309–31.
- Goldin-Meadow, Susan (2003), The Resilience of Language: What Gesture Creation in Deaf Children Can Tell Us About How All Children Learn Language, Psychology Press, a subsidiary of Taylor & Francis, New York, 2003
- Gordon, Raymond, ed. (2008). Ethnologue: Languages of the World, 15th edition. SIL International, ISBN 978-1-55671-159-6, 1-55671-159-X. Sections for primary sign languages Browse by Language Family and alternative ones Browse by Language Family.
- Groce, Nora E. (1988). Everyone here spoke sign language: Hereditary deafness on Martha's Vineyard. Cambridge, Massachusetts: Harvard University Press. ISBN 0-674-27041-X.
- Healy, Alice F. (1980). "Can Chimpanzees learn a phonemic language?" In: Sebeok, Thomas A. & Jean Umiker-Sebeok, eds, Speaking of apes: a critical anthology of two-way communication with man. New York: Plenum, 141–43.
- Kamei, Nobutaka (2004). The Sign Languages of Africa, "Journal of African Studies" (Japan Association for African Studies) Vol. 64, March, 2004. [NOTE: Kamei lists 23 African sign languages in this article].
- Kegl, Judy (1994). "The Nicaraguan Sign Language Project: An Overview". Signpost. 7 (1): 24–31.
- Kegl, Judy, Senghas A., Coppola M (1999). "Creation through contact: Sign language emergence and sign language change in Nicaragua". In: M. DeGraff (ed.), Comparative Grammatical Change: The Intersection of Language Acquisition, Creole Genesis, and Diachronic Syntax, pp. 179–237. Cambridge, Massachusetts: MIT Press.
- Kegl, Judy (2004). "Language Emergence in a Language-Ready Brain: Acquisition Issues". In: Jenkins, Lyle (ed.), Biolinguistics and the Evolution of Language. John Benjamins.
- Kendon, Adam. (1988). Sign Languages of Aboriginal Australia: Cultural, Semiotic and Communicative Perspectives. Cambridge: Cambridge University Press.
- Kroeber, Alfred L. (1940). "Stimulus diffusion". American Anthropologist. 42: 1–20. doi:10.1525/aa.1940.42.1.02a00020.
- Lane, Harlan L. (Ed.). (1984). The Deaf experience: Classics in language and education. Cambridge, Massachusetts: Harvard University Press. ISBN 0-674-19460-8.
- Lane, Harlan L. (1984). When the mind hears: A history of the deaf. New York: Random House. ISBN 0-394-50878-5.
- Madell, Samantha (1998). Warlpiri Sign Language and Auslan – A Comparison. M.A. Thesis, Macquarie University, Sydney, Australia.
- Madsen, Willard J. (1982), Intermediate Conversational Sign Language. Gallaudet University Press. ISBN 978-0-913580-79-0.
- O'Reilly, S. (2005). Indigenous Sign Language and Culture; the interpreting and access needs of Deaf people who are of Aboriginal and/or Torres Strait Islander in Far North Queensland. Sponsored by ASLIA, the Australian Sign Language Interpreters Association.
- Padden, Carol; & Humphries, Tom. (1988). Deaf in America: Voices from a culture. Cambridge, Massachusetts: Harvard University Press. ISBN 0-674-19423-3.
- Pfau, Roland, Markus Steinbach & Bencie Woll (eds.), Sign language. An international handbook (HSK – Handbooks of linguistics and communication science). Berlin: Mouton de Gruyter.
- Poizner, Howard; Klima, Edward S.; & Bellugi, Ursula. (1987). What the hands reveal about the brain. Cambridge, Massachusetts: MIT Press.
- Premack, David, & Ann J. Premack (1983). The mind of an ape. New York: Norton.
- Premack, David (1985). "'Gavagai!' or the future of the animal language controversy". Cognition. 19 (3): 207–96. doi:10.1016/0010-0277(85)90036-8. PMID 4017517. S2CID 39292094.
- Sacks, Oliver W. (1989). Seeing voices: A journey into the world of the deaf. Berkeley: University of California Press. ISBN 0-520-06083-0.
- Sandler, Wendy (2003). "Sign Language Phonology". In William Frawley (Ed.), The Oxford International Encyclopedia of Linguistics.
- Sandler, Wendy & Lillo-Martin, Diane (2001). "Natural sign languages". In M. Aronoff & J. Rees-Miller (Eds.), Handbook of linguistics (pp. 533–562). Malden, Mass.: Blackwell Publishers. ISBN 0-631-20497-0.
- Stiles-Davis, Joan; Kritchevsky, Mark; & Bellugi, Ursula (Eds.). (1988). Spatial cognition: Brain bases and development. Hillsdale, N.J.: L. Erlbaum Associates. ISBN 0-8058-0046-8; ISBN 0-8058-0078-6.
- Stokoe, William C. (1960, 1978). Sign language structure: An outline of the visual communication systems of the American deaf. Studies in linguistics, Occasional papers, No. 8, Dept. of Anthropology and Linguistics, University at Buffalo. 2d ed., Silver Spring: Md: Linstok Press.
- Stokoe, William C. (1974). Classification and description of sign languages. Current Trends in Linguistics 12.345–71.
- Twilhaar, Jan Nijen, and Beppie van den Bogaerde. 2016. Concise Lexicon for Sign Linguistics. John Benjamins Publishing Company.
- Valli, Clayton, Ceil Lucas, and Kristin Mulrooney. (2005) Linguistics of American Sign Language: An Introduction, 4th Ed. Washington, D.C.: Gallaudet University Press.
- Van Deusen-Phillips S.B., Goldin-Meadow S., Miller P.J., 2001. Enacting Stories, Seeing Worlds: Similarities and Differences in the Cross-Cultural Narrative Development of Linguistically Isolated Deaf Children, Human Development, Vol. 44, No. 6.
- Wilbur, R.B. (1987). American Sign Language: Linguistic and applied dimensions. San Diego, Calif.: College-Hill.
