= Finland-Swedish Sign Language =

Moribund deaf sign language of Finland

- finlandssvenskt teckenspråk (Swedish)
- Native to: Finland
- Ethnicity: Finland-Swedes
- Native speakers: 150 deaf and 300 total (2014); Same figure of 150 cited in 2001
- Language family: British Sign?: Swedish Sign; Finnish Sign; Finland-Swedish Sign Language

Language codes
- ISO 639-3: fss
- Glottolog: finl1235
- ELP: Finnish-Swedish Sign Language
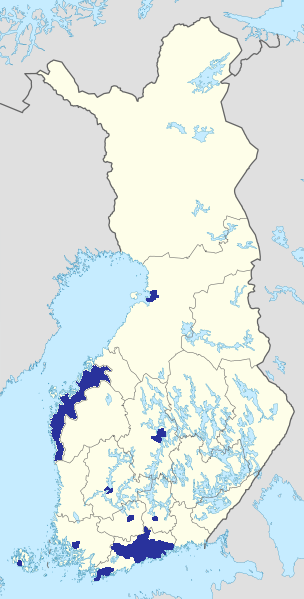

Finland-Swedish Sign Language (FinSSL; Swedish: Finlandssvenskt teckenspråk, Finnish: Suomenruotsalainen viittomakieli) is a moribund sign language in Finland. It is now used mainly in private settings by older adults who attended the only Swedish school for the deaf in Finland (in Porvoo, Swedish: Borgå), which was established in the mid-19th century by Carl Oscar Malm but closed in 1993. However, it has recently been taught to some younger individuals. Some 90 persons had it as their native language within Finland in 2014 and it is spoken by around 300 people in total.

== History ==
The first deaf school in Finland was founded in 1846 by Carl Oscar Malm, who was deaf himself. Since the closure of the deaf school in Borgå in 1993, the future of the language has been uncertain. Many families with deaf children have emigrated to Sweden because of the decision. The language is considered severely endangered according to UNESCO's criteria.

Since 2015, Finland-Swedish and Finnish sign languages have been recognized as separate languages in Finnish legislation, as the new sign language act was adopted in the parliament. However, the scientific consensus has been since 2005 that the two sign languages are distinct.

== Differences from Finnish Sign ==
A speaker of Finland-Swedish Sign Language, recorded in Finland

Through contacts between Swedish deaf individuals and Finland-Swedish deaf individuals, the Finland-Swedish sign language has borrowed many words from Swedish sign language. Additionally, the visual phonology with facial expressions follows the sounds of the Swedish language.

Swedish Sign Language family tree

Old British Sign Language? (c. 1760–1900)
Swedish Sign Language (c. 1800–present)
Portuguese Sign Language (c. 1820–present)	Finnish Sign Language (c. 1850–present)
Cape Verdian Sign Language (c. 20th century–present)	Finland-Swedish Sign Language (c. 1850–present)	Eritrean Sign Language (c. 1950–present)
São Tomé and Príncipe Sign Language? (c. 21st century–present)
