= Cape Verdian Sign Language =

Sign Language used in Cape Verde

- Língua Gestual Caboverdiana
- Native to: Cape Verde
- Native speakers: 1500
- Language family: Swedish Sign: Portuguese Sign; Cape Verdian Sign Language

Language codes
- ISO 639-3: –
- IETF: psr-CV

Cape Verdian Sign Language (Língua Gestual Caboverdiana) is the sign language used by the deaf community in Cape Verde, numbering around 1500–4000. It is descended from Portuguese sign language and is mutually intelligible with it at the present, although it contains some local adaptations. Cape Verdian sign has not been under any university research. However, a Cape Verdian Sign dictionary was released in 2019.

In 2010, a school for children who are deaf was established in Cape Verde. Another deaf school was also established in Praia.

Swedish Sign Language family tree

Old British Sign Language? (c. 1760–1900)
Swedish Sign Language (c. 1800–present)
Portuguese Sign Language (c. 1820–present)	Finnish Sign Language (c. 1850–present)
Cape Verdian Sign Language (c. 20th century–present)	Finland-Swedish Sign Language (c. 1850–present)	Eritrean Sign Language (c. 1950–present)
São Tomé and Príncipe Sign Language? (c. 21st century–present)
