= Guinea-Bissau Sign Language =

Deaf sign language of Guinea-Bissau

- Native to: Guinea-Bissau
- Language family: incipient Deaf-community sign language

Language codes
- ISO 639-3: lgs
- Glottolog: guin1260

Guinea-Bissau Sign Language (Portuguese: Língua gestual guineense or Língua de sinais guineense) is an incipient sign language evolving from the single school for the deaf in Guinea-Bissau, which was founded in Bissau in 2003. In 2005 a linguist and Portuguese Sign Language teacher found GBSL to still be basic, but with some consistency among students in the school and village use when the students went home.

It is not directly related to the Portuguese sign language, although it has borrowed the alphabet from it.
