= Finnish Sign Language =

Sign language most commonly used in Finland

- Suomalainen viittomakieli
- Native to: Finland
- Native speakers: 5,000 deaf and 15,000 total (2006) the same figure of 5,000 was cited in 1986
- Language family: ? British Sign: Swedish Sign; Finnish Sign Language

Language codes
- ISO 639-3: fse
- Glottolog: finn1310
- ELP: Finnish Sign Language

A speaker of Finnish Sign Language, recorded in Finland

Finnish Sign Language (Finnish: suomalainen viittomakieli) is the sign language most commonly used in Finland. There are appropriately 3,000 deaf people in Finland (as of a 2012 estimate) who have Finnish Sign Language as their first language. As the Finnish system records users by their written language, not their spoken alone, nearly all deaf people who sign are assigned this way and may be subsumed into the overall Finnish language figures. Historically the aim was oralism, whereby deaf people were taught to speak oral Finnish, even if they could not hear it; thus older people are recorded under these figures. In 2014, only 500 people registered Finnish Sign Language as their first language. There are several sign languages that come under this label; FSL for those that can see; Signed Finnish, which does not follow the same grammatical rules, and a version for those who are blind and deaf. Thus, there are around 8,000 people that use a Finnish Sign Language linguistically. Many estimates say 5,000, but these are exaggerations derived from the 14,000 deaf people in Finland (many of whom do not speak Finnish Sign Language). Finnish Sign Language is derived from Swedish Sign Language, which is a different language from Finnish Swedish Sign Language (which is Swedish Finnish language derived from Finnish Sign Language, of which there are an estimated 90 speakers in Finland), from which it began to separate as an independent language in the middle of the 19th century.

Finnish legislation recognized Finnish Sign Language as one of Finland's domestic languages in 1995 when it was included in the renewed constitution. Finland then became the third country in the world to recognize a sign language as a natural language and the right to use it as a mother tongue.

Courses in "sign language" have been taught in Finland since the 1960s. At that time, instruction taught signs but followed Finnish word order (see Manually Coded Language). Later, as research on sign languages in general and Finnish Sign Language in particular determined that sign languages tend to have a very different grammar from oral languages, the teaching of Finnish Sign Language and Signed Finnish diverged.

== History ==
Finnish Sign Language can be traced back to the mid-1800s when Carl Oscar Malm, a Finnish deaf individual who had studied in Sweden, founded Finland's first school for the deaf in Porvoo in 1846. The Swedish sign language used by Malm spread among Finnish deaf individuals, evolving into its own language. The first association for the deaf in Finland was established in Turku in 1886. Albert Tallroth was involved in founding five different deaf associations and also the Finnish Association of the Deaf. By the late 1800s, oralism, or the speech method, began to be favored in the education of the deaf in Finland. This led to the prohibition of sign language in schools, even under threat of punishment. And as a result of oralism, Finnish Sign Language and Finnish-Swedish Sign Language began to diverge. Despite the ban, students in deaf schools continued to use sign language secretly in dormitories. The use of sign language persisted within the deaf community, while spoken language learned in school was used when interacting with hearing individuals.

Society started to have a more positive attitude towards the deaf and sign language after the 1970s. Sign language became a tool for rehabilitation and education, and it began to be taught in courses for parents of deaf children. In 1979, interpreter services became part of disability legislation, and in 1995, sign language gained constitutional status. In 1991, the possibility of sign language education was written into the Basic Education Act. The current Basic Education Act, as well as the latest curriculum framework for basic education in the 2014 Basic Education Curriculum, specify that "if necessary, education should be provided in sign language for the hearing impaired." Education in sign language is mandatory for deaf individuals who have learned sign language as their first language.

Swedish Sign Language family tree

Old British Sign Language? (c. 1760–1900)
Swedish Sign Language (c. 1800–present)
Portuguese Sign Language (c. 1820–present)	Finnish Sign Language (c. 1850–present)
Cape Verdian Sign Language (c. 20th century–present)	Finland-Swedish Sign Language (c. 1850–present)	Eritrean Sign Language (c. 1950–present)
São Tomé and Príncipe Sign Language? (c. 21st century–present)

== Education ==
Sign language can be studied as a major at the University of Jyväskylä. Additionally, it has been possible to complete basic studies in sign language and communication at the University of Turku.

One can study to become a sign language instructor at Pohjois-Savo Folk High School in Kuopio, at Rovala-Opisto in Rovaniemi, and at Turku Christian Institute.

Finnish Sign Language can be studied at the Finnish Association of the Deaf Folk High School, adult education centers, and summer universities.

== See also ==
- Carl Oscar Malm, founder of Finnish Sign Language

== Relevant literature ==
- Kanto, Laura; Syrjälä, Henna; Mann, Wolfgang (2021). "Assessing vocabulary in deaf and hearing children using Finnish Sign Language". The Journal of Deaf Studies and Deaf Education. 26 (1): 147–158. doi:10.1093/deafed/enaa032. PMID 33057687.
- Rissanen, Terhi (1987). "Finnish". In Van Cleve, John V. (ed.). Gallaudet Encyclopedia of Deaf People and Deafness. Vol. 3. New York: McGraw-Hill Book Company. pp. 71–74. ISBN 9780070792296. OCLC 13821696.
- Takkinen, Ritva (2008). "The Acquisition of Finnish Sign Language". In Klippi, Anu; Launonen, Kaisa (eds.). Research in Logopedics. Communication Disorders Across Languages. Multilingual Matters. pp. 175–205. doi:10.21832/9781847690593-011. ISBN 9781847690593.
