= Portuguese Sign Language =

Sign language

- LGP, Língua gestual portuguesa
- Native to: Portugal
- Native speakers: 60,000 (2014)
- Language family: Swedish Sign: Portuguese Sign Language

Language codes
- ISO 639-3: psr
- Glottolog: port1277
- ELP: Portuguese Sign Language

Portuguese Sign Language (Portuguese: Língua gestual portuguesa) is a sign language used mainly by deaf people in Portugal.

It is recognized in the present Constitution of Portugal. It was significantly influenced by Swedish Sign Language, through a school for the Deaf that was established in Lisbon by Swedish educator Pär Aron Borg.

Portuguese Sign is the basis of Cape Verdian Sign, and it has also slightly influenced Guinea-Bissau Sign. Some reports have said that São Tomé and Príncipe Sign Language has considerable mutual intelligibility with Portuguese Sign. It is also reported that Portuguese Sign has been also used in Angola.

== History ==
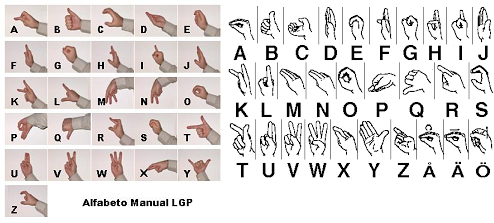
Swedish Sign (right) and Portuguese Sign (left) alphabets compared

The Portuguese Sign Language has its origins from the Swedish Sign Language (LGS), as in the 19th century, the king called to Portugal Pär Aron Borg, a Swede who had founded an institute for the education of the deaf in Sweden. In 1823, the first school for the deaf was made in Portugal. Although many signs were transported from Swedish Sign to Portuguese sign, thus sharing a common root, it has evolved autonomously and become very distinct from the sign language used in Sweden.

Swedish Sign Language family tree

Old British Sign Language? (c. 1760–1900)
Swedish Sign Language (c. 1800–present)
Portuguese Sign Language (c. 1820–present)	Finnish Sign Language (c. 1850–present)
Cape Verdian Sign Language (c. 20th century–present)	Finland-Swedish Sign Language (c. 1850–present)	Eritrean Sign Language (c. 1950–present)
São Tomé and Príncipe Sign Language? (c. 21st century–present)

== See also ==
- Deafness in Portugal
- Portuguese manual alphabet
