= Judy Shepard-Kegl =

American linguist

- Born: June 20, 1953 (age 73); Evergreen Park, Illinois
- Occupations: Linguist, full professor

Academic background
- Education: Brown University (BA, MA); Massachusetts Institute of Technology (PhD)

Academic work
- Discipline: Linguistics
- Institutions: University of Southern Maine
- Notable works: Nicaraguan sign language

Judy Shepard-Kegl (born June 20, 1953) is an American linguist and University of Southern Maine professor, best known for research on the Nicaraguan sign language.

== Education ==
Kegl received a Bachelor of Arts with a major in anthropology and a Master of Arts in linguistics both in 1975 from Brown University. They received a Doctor of Philosophy in linguistics from the Massachusetts Institute of Technology in 1985.

Their master's thesis was entitled "Some Observations on Bilingualism: A Look at Data from Slovene-English Bilinguals." Their doctoral dissertation was entitled "Locative Relations in American Sign Language Word Formation, Syntax and Discourse".

== Career ==
Shepard-Kegl is currently a tenured professor of Linguistics and coordinator of the ASL/English Interpreting Program at the University of Southern Maine.

They have worked and written extensively within their field and are best known for their work and multiple academic publishings on the Nicaraguan Sign Language (or ISN, Idioma de Señas de Nicaragua or Idioma de Signos Nicaragüense), a sign language spontaneously developed by deaf children in a number of schools in western Nicaragua in the 1970s and 1980s.

== Selected publications ==
- Carol Neidle, Judy Kegl, Dawn MacLaughlin, Benjamin Bahan and Robert G. Lee. 1999. The syntax of American Sign Language. The MIT Press. ISBN ISBN 9780262140676
- J Kegl, A Senghas, M Coppola. 1999. Creation through contact: Sign language emergence and sign language change in Nicaragua. In: Language Creation and Language Change, ed. by Michael de Graff. The MIT Press. ISBN 9780262041683
- Gary Morgan, Judy Kegl. 2006. Nicaraguan Sign Language and Theory of Mind: the issue of critical periods and abilities. The Journal of Child Psychology and Psychiatry 47: 811-819. https://doi.org/10.1111/j.1469-7610.2006.01621.x
