= São Tomé and Príncipe Sign Language =

Deaf sign language of São Tomé and Príncipe

- Native to: São Tome and Príncipe
- Language family: village sign, although possibly related to Portuguese Sign, which belongs to the Swedish Sign Language family

Language codes
- ISO 639-3: None (mis)
- Glottolog: saot1241

São Tomé and Príncipe Sign Language (LGSTP) is an emerging village sign language of the island state of São Tomé and Príncipe, and around 500 signs have been recorded so far. There exist no interpreters, no official training or media for LGSTP.

Some reports have said that LGSTP is similar to Portuguese Sign and that much of it is mutually intelligible with Portuguese Sign.
