= Si5s =

Writing system for American Sign Language

si5s
- Script type: Alternative (Featural)
- Creator: Robert Arnold
- Period: 2003–present
- Direction: Left-to-right
- Languages: ASL

Related scripts
- Parent systems: SignWriting: si5s
- Child systems: ASLwrite

Unicode
- Unicode range: None

si5s is a writing system for American Sign Language that resembles a handwritten form of SignWriting. It was devised in 2003 in New York City by Robert Arnold, with an unnamed collaborator. In July 2010 at the Deaf Nation World Expo in Las Vegas, Nevada, it was presented and formally announced to the public. Soon after its release, si5s development split into two branches: the "official" si5s track monitored by Arnold and a new set of partners at ASLized, and the "open source" ASLwrite. In 2015, Arnold had a falling-out with his ASLized partners, took down the si5s.org website, and made his Twitter account private. ASLized has since removed any mention of si5s from their website.

Arnold completed his master's thesis, A Proposal for a Written System of American Sign Language, at Gallaudet University in 2007, looking at the need for a written form for ASL, and proposing the use of si5s. si5s stresses that the "written system is not to offer readers and scholars how sign language functions but how signers think and communicate in sign language." Its objective is to provide transparency between ASL, as a written language, and other written languages, to allow for a literary study of sign language without glossing. Arnold is currently a faculty member of the Sign Language & Interpreting program at Mt. San Antonio College.

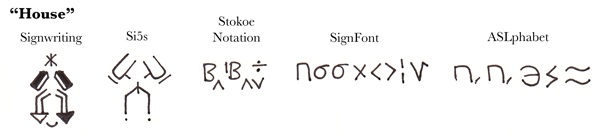
Comparison of some ASL writing systems. SignWriting is at the far left, si5s to the right of it.

== Components ==
si5s and ASLWrite are built from five primary components:

1. the digibet
2. diacritics
3. movement marks
4. locatives
5. extramanual marks

Not every component is needed for every word, but ASL employs each consistently.

At its core, any word written is built from the digibet bank and additional features are added. Words such as "I-LOVE-YOU" do not necessarily need anything more than its handshape, whereas others can employ each or nearly every component. Some words are written as logographs, such as "WHO" and "FOR-FOR".

To build a word, handshapes are bound to locatives with diacritics and movement marks bound to the handshape graphemes themselves. Extramanual marks are inserted above to the left or right of the word. As such, there is no set positioning or graphic orientation of the handshape or movement marks.

=== Digibet ===
The core of the writing system, the digibet, represents many handshapes of ASL. They are conditioned by left-/right-handedness, orientation and relative location. There are 67 handshapes within the digibet as of yet.

=== Diacritics ===
Diacritics mark movement of the hand itself such as a flutter in "FLIRT" or hinge in "YES" or "CAN". The diacritics are:

1. Hinge
2. Rotational
3. Rattle
4. Flutter
5. Edge

=== Movement marks ===
Movement marks indicate the movement of the word itself. Some movement marks are systematic, such as move outward, others are less so, such as "WALK-DRUNKENLY."

=== Locatives ===
Locatives indicate when a word is bound to the body (rather than produced in the signing space). They are subcategorised into two fields: frontal and profile.

- Frontal: The frontal locatives are: forehead, chin, neck, shoulders, forearm and waist.
- Profile: The profile locatives are: forehead, back of head, full face, nose, chin, torso and knee.

=== Extramanual marks ===
Extramanual features include facial configurations and body movements.

si5s/ASLwrite extramanual marks are subcategorised into four types: eyebrow marks, questioning marks, mouth morphemes and body movements.

- The eyebrow marks are: raise, knit, wan, slanted and squint;
- questioning marks: who, what, where, when, which, why, how and for-for;
- mouth morphemes: smile, frown, flat lips, pressed lips, tongue out, pursed lips, lips out, open mouth, bared teeth, cha, round mouth, puffed cheeks, puffed and round and pulled to the side;
- body movement: head nod, shoulder shift and nose crinkle.

In total, there are 30 extramanual marks.

== See also ==
- Stokoe notation
- ASL-phabet
- ASLwrite
- Hamburg Notation System (HamNoSys)
- SignWriting

== Bibliography ==
- Sign Language & Interpreting – Mt. San Antonio College
