= Cena (sign language) =

Village sign language of Brazil

- Native to: sertão of Piauí
- Region: Várzea Queimada, Brazil
- Language family: village sign

Language codes
- ISO 639-3: –
- Glottolog: cena1234

Cena is a village sign language used by 34 known deaf signers and many more hearing inhabitants of Várzea Queimada, a small, agricultural community in the sertão (scrubland) of Piauí, north-eastern Brazil. It is currently in its third generation of users.

== History ==
The existence of Cena is largely motivated by two key factors: a greater prevalence of congenital deafness in the local population relative to global or national averages, and the geographical isolation of the community, which until recently, existed for generations without a road connecting the cluster of villages to the region's highway. Cena (literally: ‘scene’, the word used to refer to what signers recount with their hands as they sign) is indigenous to the community of Várzea Queimada, emerging after the birth of several deaf children in the village beginning in the 1950s. An initial cohort of deaf children is a common catalyst in the emergence of village sign languages; notable examples include Kata Kolok, Al-Sayyid Bedouin Sign Language, and Adamorobe Sign Language.

The birth of the first deaf child in the village came many decades after the establishment of the first deaf institute in Rio de Janeiro in 1857, known today as the National Institute for Deaf Education (Instituto Nacional de Educação de Surdos, or INES). The foundation of INES is commonly associated with the emergence of Libras – the national sign language of Brazil – as it was here that local sign languages or varieties existing in the region first came into sustained contact with French Sign Language, creating the creolization conditions from which Libras is thought to have emerged. Despite the genesis story of Libras beginning decades prior to the birth of deaf children in Várzea Queimada, the geographical isolation of the community from large urban centres and deaf schools meant that these children grew up in the absence of a language model. Language deprivation of children who experience the critical period without sufficient linguistic input is a particular problem for deaf and hard-of-hearing children. When this occurs in a geographically isolated community with a singular deaf child, a home sign system will often arise - a manual communication system developed spontaneously by the deaf child in order to communicate with those around the child. Unlike the gestural output of caregivers that deaf children receive in this context, homesign typically exhibits some properties more akin to language that solely gesture, making such systems of particular note to the field of developmental linguistics in observing the extent of linguistic development in the absence of a language model. However, the birth of multiple deaf children into an isolated community creates a context for a shared system to emerge. These are the conditions under which many village sign languages, including Cena, arise.

Six of the first deaf children in Várzea Queimada were siblings, and it is thought that it was from the repeated interactions of these siblings that modern-day Cena emerged. Its development has attracted the attention of national news in Brazil, as well as linguistic researchers. It is of interest to linguists primarily because languages like Cena offer a rare chance to see the emergence and development of a natural human language largely free from influence from existing languages, making such languages distinct from pidgin languages, creole languages, and Deaf-community sign language (where sign languages often emerge as a result of the mixing of various homesign systems following the establishment of a community institution).

As these deaf signers grew older and had children of their own, unlike some of their parents, subsequent deaf children in the community grew up with an existing language model, themselves developing alongside the language in its own infancy. Ongoing observation allows linguists to track the development of various levels of linguistic structure, considering existing research demonstrates that preferences for specific structures emerge quickly and differ over successive cohorts of signers in a young language.

Interactions between some of these signers, including the telling of narratives, was the subject of the 2019 film Jogos Dirigidos (Directed Games), commissioned by the Chicago Museum of Contemporary Art. The relative prevalence of deaf members of the community means that Cena is used as the preferred language of the deaf residents, but also by many hearing people of Várzea Queimada – often the family or friends of the deaf.

== Linguistics ==
Cena has a robust lexicon of native signs, including native compounds. Lexical documentation has contributed to initial linguistic descriptions of the language, as well as the Cena-Libras dictionary, one of the first sign-sign dictionaries in existence. Typologically, Cena exhibits many features typical of sign languages such as non-manual adverbial modification, but also features typical of village sign languages in particular. In small communities which have a high degree of shared reference, use of real-world location for reference through pointing is common - Cena is no exception. Cena also lacks a native manual alphabet.

Cena signers vary in word order preferences. In general, word order varies according to the valency of the sentence – the number of arguments a verb takes. As in many other languages, intransitive events are generally subject-first (e.g. a woman runs). For transitive events, word order preferences show sensitivity to the animacy of the object. In transitive events with an inanimate object (e.g. a woman rolls a ball), sentences tend to be subject-object-verb, whilst with animate objects (e.g. a woman pushes a girl) both subject-object-verb and object-subject-verb orders are common. There is little convergence with ditransitive events (e.g. a woman gives a shirt to a man). Verb agreement has been observed in the second and third generation of signers but not the first and oldest generation, although this generation only contains one signer. Nonetheless, word order is not the only strategy employed to mark argument structure. Signers have been observed to repeat the agent of a verb event in code-switches (between Cena and Libras) to mark their role in the event, similarly to how a speaker of a spoken language might use stress. This strategy has not been observed in any other language in the existing literature, and is likely a result of a lack of other stable strategies to mark argument structure (such as verb agreement) due to the language's relative youth. As such, this reveals the various strategies a young language may employ on the pathway to widespread conventionalization. An example of these reiterative code-switches is provided below:

MAN[LIBRAS] STAY-loc1; WOMAN[CENA] WOMAN[LIBRAS] CL:object-HOLD GIVE-loc1
A woman gives something to a man.

Signs exhibit notable articulatory variation in how they are articulated by different signers, suggesting that Cena, much like other village sign languages such as Al-Sayyid Bedouin Sign Language, does not yet have a fully-fledged systematic level of phonological structure. If signs are not made up of meaningless sublexical features of handshape, location, and movement which recombine to form different signs, considerable articulatory variation is possible as signers do not have to adhere to specific feature specifications in articulation. However, again like Al-Sayyid Bedouin Sign Language, evidence of at least one process which targets the phonological level of structure has been found in assimilation, suggesting that perhaps some phonological structure may be emerging.

== Várzea Queimada ==
Várzea Queimada Várzea Queimada
- Agricultural community
- Country: Brazil
- State: Piauí

Population
  - Total: 900

Várzea Queimada is a small, agricultural community in centre of the north-eastern Brazilian state of Piauí, around 30 km from the nearest city of Jaicós and around 350 km away from the state capital Teresina. The 900-strong population is largely agricultural, with most families practicing subsistence farming. Various aspects of the village's sociocultural practices and organization are covered in detail in the PhD thesis of Éverton Pereira.

=== Education ===
Two school streams exist in the community, operating out of Manoel Barbosa Municipal School, which offers all basic education for children, teenagers and adults in the village and surrounding areas. During the day shift provides early years and elementary education. At night, there are high school classes as well as supplementary education initiatives for deaf adults. As it has been historically common for deaf students to drop out of school as children or teenagers, such initiatives allow deaf residents to return to school as adults. For a temporary period, a Libras teacher was hired to teach these classes, using Libras and written Portuguese as the language of instruction. Benefits were limited by a lack of teaching resources and curriculum fit for deaf students. The trilingual environment posed many challenges, compounded by the lack of competency in Cena of all but one of the staff.

Likely with such obstacles as a significant contributing factor, several deaf adults stopped attending. As such, fluency in Libras within the community is uncommon, particularly among the older deaf population. Cena is the dominant language in the community, and for the most part signers are not Cena-Libras bilinguals. Former teachers who worked with Várzea Queimada's deaf population described a rejection of Libras within an educational setting, and deaf signers themselves report (and exhibit) a widespread preference for Cena in daily life
