= Hamburg Notation System =

Phonetic transcription system for sign languages

Hamburg Notation System HamNoSys
- Script type: Alphabet used for phonetic transcription of sign languages
- Creator: University of Hamburg
- Created: 1984
- Direction: Left to right

The Hamburg Sign Language Notation System (HamNoSys) is a transcription system for all sign languages (including American Sign Language). It has a direct correspondence between symbols and gesture aspects, such as hand location, shape and movement. It was developed in 1984 at the University of Hamburg, Germany. As of 2020, it is in its fourth revision.

Though it has roots in Stokoe notation, HamNoSys does not identify with any specific national diversified fingerspelling system, and as such is intended for a wider range of applications than Stokoe which was designed specifically for ASL and only later adapted to other sign languages.

Unlike SignWriting and the Stokoe system, it is not intended as a practical writing system, and is mainly used to describe the nuances of a single sign. It is more like the International Phonetic Alphabet in that regard. Both systems are meant for use by linguists, and include details such as phonemes leading to long, complex segments.

HamNoSys is not encoded in Unicode. Computer processing is made possible by a HamNoSysUnicode.ttf font, which uses Private Use Area characters.

== Use ==
HamNoSys can depict most sign languages, so the notation system is used internationally in research settings. Notable universities doing research with the writing system are major institutions in Finland, Australia, New Zealand, Switzerland, Poland, Czechia, and Germany. Several sign language resources have been published with HamNoSys transcriptions of citation forms of individual signs, such as the Public DGS Corpus, the Corpus-based Dictionary of Polish Sign Language and Dictio.

HamNoSys is also the basis for the Signing Gesture Mark-up Language (SiGML with an i to differentiate from SGML), an XML notation for the description of sign language phonetics. SiGML is intended as a machine-readable phonetic representation for natural language processing applications such as 3D rendered signing avatars.

== Symbols and Features ==
The script includes almost 200 symbols and utilizes subscripts, superscripts, and diacritics. There are five categories of characters used in HamNoSys, which, when put together, describe a sign. A single sign is expressed by a series of symbols that contain various optional and required parameters in the order listed:

1. Symmetry Operator (Optional) is usually represented with two dots to signal both hands are used to do the sign or specify if the non-dominant hand is used.
2. Non-Manual Marker (NMM) (Optional) is an optional parameter to symbolize any facial or vocal actions that occur when using the sign, for example, pursing one's lips or raising eyebrows. Various symbols for handshapes with closed fists and extended fingers
3. Various symbols for handshapes with closed fists and extended fingers
  Handshape describes the shape of the hand, for example, how many fingers should be extended to what, if any, degree the fingers should be bent, and the location of the thumb. The most common symbols used in this category contain an oval with lines to symbolize fingers extended, curved lines to describe how fingers should be bent (with corresponding numbers 1-5 to signify which finger), and any marks or breaks inside the oval can symbolize the distance between the fingers and palm.
4. Hand orientation is also part of the same segment as (3). These show, for example, the palm orientation or direction the extended fingers are pointing. When discussing palm orientation, the symbols include narrow ovals with one thick side, that side facing different directions, in combination with small carrots signaling certain or more advanced angles, and pointing concerning something else.
5. Hand location describes where one's hand is when signing compared to one's body. Some signs occur in front of the sternum or shoulders, while others at the chin or temple. Using symbols that often look like the body parts being described, locations of are marked by a black square placed in the feature's orientation.
6. Movement (Optional) denotes any movement in the signs, like a finger pointing up then down or a sign traveling from left to right of the sternum. These are often complex, using symbols similar to those in hand orientation (4) with arrows and carrots, with lines that can symbolize straight, wavy, or circular movements. There are also characters like brackets or parentheses to separate sequential or unified movements.
