= Stokoe notation =

Phonemic script for sign languages

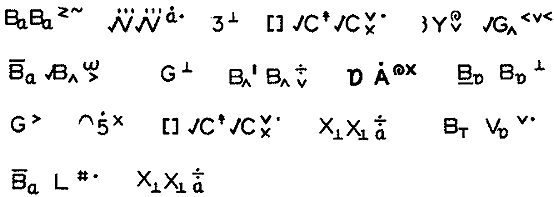
- Script type: alphabet
- Period: 1960 to present
- Direction: Left-to-right
- Languages: ASL

Related scripts
- Child systems: ASL-phabet

Stokoe notation (/ˈstoʊki/ STOH-kee) is the first phonemic script used for sign languages. It was created by William Stokoe for American Sign Language (ASL), with Latin letters and numerals used for the shapes they have in fingerspelling, and iconic glyphs to transcribe the position, movement, and orientation of the hands. It was first published as the organizing principle of Sign Language Structure: An Outline of the Visual Communication Systems of the American Deaf (1960), and later also used in A Dictionary of American Sign Language on Linguistic Principles, by Stokoe, Casterline, and Croneberg (1965). In the 1965 dictionary, signs are themselves arranged alphabetically, according to their Stokoe transcription, rather than being ordered by their English glosses as in other sign-language dictionaries. This made it the only ASL dictionary where the reader could look up a sign without first knowing how to translate it into English. The Stokoe notation was later adapted to British Sign Language (BSL) in Kyle et al. (1985) and to Australian Aboriginal sign languages in Kendon (1988). In each case the researchers modified the alphabet to accommodate phonemes not found in ASL.

The Stokoe notation is mostly restricted to linguists and academics. The notation is arranged linearly on the page and can be written with a typewriter that has the proper font installed. Unlike SignWriting or the Hamburg Notation System, it is based on the Latin alphabet and is phonemic, being restricted to the symbols needed to meet the requirements of ASL (or extended to BSL, etc.) rather than accommodating all possible signs. For example, there is a single symbol for circling movement, regardless of whether the plane of the movement is horizontal or vertical.

== Writing direction ==
Stokoe notation is written horizontally left to right like the Latin alphabet (plus limited vertical stacking of movement symbols, and some diacritical marks written above or below other symbols). This contrasts with SignWriting, which is written vertically from top to bottom (plus partially free two-dimensional placement of components within the writing of a single sign).

== Symbol usage ==
Stokoe coined the terms tab ("tabula" or sign location), dez ("designator" or handshape & orientation), and sig ("signation" or motion & action). These are used to categorize features of sign-language phonemes, somewhat like the distinction between consonant, vowel, and tone is used in the description of oral languages. A sign is written in the order tab-dez-sig: TD^{s}. Compound signs are separated with a double dashed pipe, approximately TD^{s}¦¦TD^{s}.

A serious deficiency of the system is that it does not provide for facial expression, mouthing, eye gaze, and body posture, as Stokoe had not worked out their phonemics in ASL. Verbal inflection and non-lexical movement is awkward to notate, and more recent analyses such as those of Ted Supalla have contradicted Stokoe's set of motion phonemes. There is also no provision for representing the relationship between signs in their natural context, which restricts the usefulness of the notation to the lexical or dictionary level. Nonetheless, Stokoe demonstrated for the first time that a sign language can be written phonemically just like any other language.

In the tables below, the first column is a web-based approximation of the Stokoe symbol using the inventory available in Unicode, and the second is an ASCII substitution for the purpose of citing examples in this article. Proper display of the third column requires the Stokoe font available at the external link below; without that font, you will see the corresponding ASCII character, as used in Mandel (1993).

=== Tab (Location) ===
The tab symbols are a null sign for a neutral location and iconic symbols for parts of the head, arm, and torso. In addition, the dez (handshape) symbols below may be used to indicate that the location is the passive hand in a specific shape.

Unicode approximation	ASCII approximation	Stokoe (Note: Proper display requires installation of the Stokoe font available at the external link below.)	Description
Ø	0	0	neutral location
⩇	Q	h	face, or whole head (symbol is superimposed ᴖ and ᴗ)
∩	P	u	forehead, brow, or upper face
⊔	T	m	eyes, nose, or mid face
∪	U	l	lips, chin, or lower face
Ȝ	}	c	cheek, temple, ear, or side face
Π	N	k	neck
[ ]	[ ]	[]	torso, shoulders, chest, trunk
Ƨ	7	i	non-dominant upper arm
√	J	j	non-dominant elbow, forearm
ɑ	9	a	inside of wrist
ɒ	6	b	back of wrist

Given a handshape (dez) ⟨D⟩, (Note: "D" is not used for a specific handshape, but is a stand-in here for whichever dez is used.) ⟨QD⟩ would be D signed at the face, ⟨JD⟩ the same handshape signed at the elbow, and ⟨9D⟩ on the inside of the wrist.

=== Dez (Handshape) ===
The symbols for handshapes are taken from the ASL manual alphabet: ⟨A⟩ represents a fist, the handshape used for fingerspelling "A" (and also "S" and "T", since the difference is not significant outside fingerspelling and initialisms); ⟨B⟩ represents a flat hand, the handshape used for fingerspelling "B" and "4", etc. When a dez involves two hands, two letters are used.

Dez symbols may also be used as tabs. For example, ⟨QB⟩ represents a flat hand, B, located at the face, Q, and <BB> represents a dominant flat hand B acting on a passive flat hand B. The latter is disambiguated from two B hands acting together by using another letter for the tab, such as ⟨ØBB⟩ for two B hands acting in neutral space, or ⟨QBB⟩ for both hands at the face.

Besides the shape of the hands, the dez includes their orientation. This is indicated, when necessary, with subscripts, which are introduced in the next section.

A	fist (as ASL 'a', 's', or 't')
B	flat hand (as ASL 'b' or '4')
5	spread hand (as ASL '5')
C	cupped hand (as ASL 'c', or more open)
E	claw hand (as ASL 'e', or more clawlike)
F	okay hand (as ASL 'f'; thumb & index touch or cross)
G	pointing hand (as ASL 'g' 'd' or '1')
H	index + middle fingers together (as ASL 'h,' 'n' or 'u')
I	pinkie (as ASL 'i')
K	thumb touches middle finger of V (as ASL 'k' or 'p')
L	angle hand, thumb + index (as ASL 'l')
3	vehicle classifier hand, thumb + index + middle fingers (as ASL '3')
O	tapered hand, fingers curved to touch thumbtip (as ASL 'o')
R	crossed fingers (as ASL 'r')
V	spread index + middle fingers (as ASL 'v' or '2')
W	thumb touches pinkie (as ASL 'w')
X	hook (as ASL 'x')
Y	horns (as ASL 'y', or as index + pinkie)
8	bent middle finger; may touch thumb (as ASL '8', this is a common allophone of Y)

There are three diacritics that modify the shape of the dez. A dot placed above it shows that a finger not normally seen is prominent, usually because it is involved in the production of the sign. For example, ⟨Ȧ⟩ (ascii 'A) is a fist with the thumb extended, as in ⟨UȦ^{f}⟩ not. Three dots or ticks over a letter shows the fingers are flexed, so that ⟨B⃛⟩ (ascii ;B) is a flexed flat hand, and ⟨V⃛⟩ (;V) is two flexed fingers. The forearm tab sign prefixed to the dez (ascii j) shows that the forearms are prominent in the production of the sign, as in ⟨B̅_{ɑ} jB_{^}^{ω}⟩ tree.

=== Sig (movement) and dez orientation ===
The movement of the hand, or sig, is written with superscripted letters after the dez, as D^{#} (any dez D which closes). Multiple movement sigs are arranged linearly when the movements are sequential, as in TD^{×∨×} (any dez D which touches a tab T, moves down, and touches again),^{1} but stacked one above the other when signed simultaneously, as in TD×ͮ (a dez which moves down while in contact with the tab).^{2}

A dot placed above the sig indicates that the motion is sharp, as in TD^{×̇} (sharp contact by the dez D),^{3} while a dot placed after the sig indicates that the motion is repeated, as in TD^{×·} (repeated contact by the dez; TDx" in ASCII).

A tilde with a two-hand dez, TDD^{s~}, indicates that first one hand performs the sig, then the other. Without the tilde, both hands are understood to act together.

A subset of the sig symbols used for motion are also used to indicate the orientation of the hand. In this use they are subscripted after the dez instead of superscripted, as in D_{#} (any dez D which starts off closed).^{4} Stokoe analyzed the orientation of the hand as part of the tab, the handshape.

Movement (sig)				Orientation (dez)			
Unicode	ASCII	Stokoe*	Description	Unicode	ASCII	Stokoe*	Description
D^{ʌ}	D^	D^{^}	moving upward	D_{ʌ}	^D	D_{^}	facing or pointing upward
D^{v}	Dv	D^{v}	moving downward	D_{v}	vD	D_{v}	facing or pointing downward
D^{ɴ}	Dw	D^{r}	moving up and down	—			
D^{>}	D>	D^{>}	to the dominant side	D_{>}	>D	D_{>}	facing the dominant side
D^{<}	D<	D^{<}	to the center or non-dominant side	D_{<}	<D	D_{<}	facing the center or non-dominant side
D^{≷}	Dz	D^{z}	side to side	—			
D^{⊤}	Dt	D^{t}	toward signer	D_{⊤}	tD	D_{t}	facing signer
D^{⊥}	Df	D^{f}	away from signer	D_{⊥}	fD	D_{f}	facing away from signer
Dᶦ	Dm	D^{=}	to and from	—			
D^{ɑ}	Da	D^{a}	supinate (turn palm up)	D_{ɑ}	aD	D_{a}	supine (palm facing up)
D^{ɒ}	Db	D^{b}	pronate (turn palm down)	D_{ɒ}	bD	D_{b}	prone (palm facing down)
D^{ω}	Dg	D^{w}	twist wrist back & forth	—			
D^{ŋ}	Dr	D^{n}	nod hand, bend wrist	D_{ŋ}	rD	D_{n}	bent wrist
D^{◽}[D′]	D*[D′]	D^{]}[D′]	open up (resulting Dez D' shown in brackets)	D_{◽}	*D	D_{]}	open
D^{#}[D′]	D#[D′]	D^{#}[D′]	close (resulting Dez D' shown in brackets)	D_{#}	#D	D_{#}	closed
D^{ᴥ}	De	D^{e}	wriggle fingers (symbol looks like a cursive e)	—			
D^{@}	D@	D^{@}	circle (symbol is a spiral)	—			
D^{)(}	D)(	D^{)}	approach, move together	D₎₍	)(D	D_{)}	near
D^{×}	Dx	D^{x}	contact, touch	D_{×}	xD	D_{x}	touching
D^{≬}	D$	D^{g}	link, grasp	D_{≬}	$D	D_{g}	linked
D^{‡}	D+	D^{+}	cross	D_{‡}	+D	D_{+}	crossed
D^{ʘ}	Do	D^{o}	enter	D_{ʘ}	oD	D_{o}	inside
D^{÷}	D%	D^{:}	separate	—			
Dʻʼ	D§ or D&	D^{(}	exchange positions	—			

* Proper display requires installation of the Stokoe font available at the external link below.

^{1} TDx-v-x in ASCII
^{2} TDxv in ASCII
^{3} TDx! in ASCII
^{4} Closing hand and closed hand would be D# and #D in the ASCII system.

Several linguists, including Kyle & Woll, state that Stokoe's tab conflates two parameters, handshape and orientation, and split off ori (orientation of the hand) as a fourth parameter. Kendon, however, notes how this greatly complicates the phonological description of signs, and prefers to retain orientation as an aspect of the handshape, with changes of orientation analysed as other changes in the hands, rather than as changes in an independent parameter.

=== Relative location ===
When the tab is a hand shape, or the dez consists of two hands, a symbol may be placed between the two letters to indicate their relative position. These include a few of the movement/orientation letters above. In addition, there are symbols to indicate position above, below, next to, and behind: the underscore on the B in B L shows that the L hand is placed under a B hand, with or without contact, etc.

Unicode	ASCII (Note: The free font does not cover these symbols)	Description
B̲ A	B A	(underline) A under B
B̅ A	B̅ A	(overline) A over B
B^{l}B	B|B	B next to B
A_{⌕}A	A\A	A behind A
B^{‡}B	B+B	B hands or forearms cross
F^{≬}F	F$F	F hands (fingers) clasped or linked
5^{ʘ}G	5oG	G hand (finger) within 5 hand (between fingers)

== Example ==
This is the ASL word "Snake" in Stokoe notation:

The ASL word SNAKE in Stokoe notation

The first letter, ᴗ (like a U), shows that the word is signed at the lower face (mouth or chin). The second, V⃛_{ɒ}, shows that the hand has the shape of a fingerspelled "V". The V has two diacritics: the three dots ^{...} above it show that the fingers are bent (curled), while the subscript ɒ shows that the hand is held with the back of the hand facing up. The last letters, @
⊥, are a compound sig: the spiral shows a circular motion, and the tack ˔ underneath shows that the motion proceeds outward. This is a mimetic sign for 'snake', mimicking the motion of a fanged snake. It is alphabetized under to the tab U, then by the dez V, then by the sig @; the searcher does not need to know what it means or that it is glossed with the English word snake in order to look it up.

Following is a passage from Goldilocks:

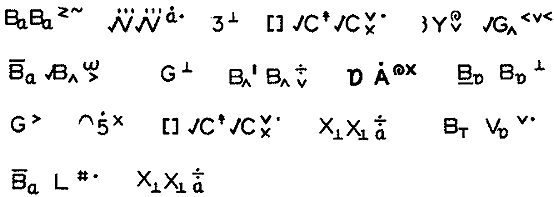
A passage from Goldilocks in ASL, transcribed in Stokoe notation

B_{ɑ}B_{ɑ}^{z~}
story(?)
√V⃛√V⃛ ^{ɑ̇•}
quote
Ʒ^{⊥}
three
[]√C^{‡}√Cv
×^{•}
bear(s)
ȜY@
v
Goldilocks
√G_{ʌ}^{<v<}
way.in
B̅_{ɑ}√B_{ʌ}ω
woods
G^{⊥}
up
B_{ʌ}^{l}B_{ʌ}÷
v
house
ⱰȦ^{@×}
sitting.there
B_{ɒ}B_{ɒ}^{⊥}
enter
G^{>}
that.there
ᴖ5^{×}
father
[]√C^{‡}√Cv
×^{•}
bear
X_{⊥}X_{⊥}÷
ɑ
open.paper
B_{⊤}V_{ɒ}^{v•}
read
B̅_{ɑ}L^{#•}
newspaper
X_{⊥}X_{⊥}÷
ɑ
open.paper

The story "Goldilocks and the Three Bears". Deep in the woods, there is a house sitting on a hill. (If you) go in, (you will see) there Papa Bear reading the paper.

== Published use of Stokoe notation ==
The first use of Stokoe notation appeared in the ASL Dictionary compiled by Stokoe, Casterline, and Croneberg, for which it was devised. Other indigenous sign language dictionary projects, for example the Dictionary of British Sign Language/English, ed. David Brien, pub. Faber and Faber 1992, and Signs of a Sexual Nature have included Stokoe notation. The notation has also been used to analyze Australian Aboriginal sign languages. These non-ASL projects have had to extend the notation to cover phonemes not found in ASL.

== See also ==
- ASL-phabet, a simplified notation used in ASL-English dictionaries for Deaf children and Deaf education
- HamNoSys, a phonetic notational system used primarily for linguistic research
- SignWriting, a popular system that arranges symbols in a two-dimensional space rather than in a line
- si5s
