= Spoken language =

Language produced with articulated sounds

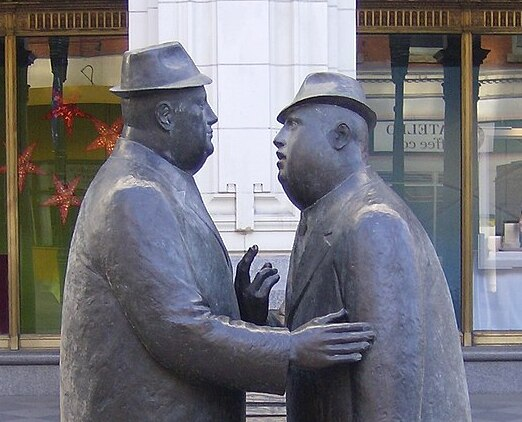
The Conversation by William McElcheran, a statue depicting two men engaged in conversation

A spoken language is a structured system of communication that is produced with speech, sometimes specifically also called an oral language or vocal language to differentiate it from written language and possibly from sign language. However, the term "spoken language" may also be used to incorporate sign languages, referring to any natural language or forms of language other than transcribed or written ones.

Spoken (including signed) language is traditionally ephemeral, only communicated once, and not retrievable after being produced—notwithstanding modern voice-recording and audiovisual technology. This differs from written language, whose explicit purpose is to represent an enduring message on a physical surface. The major written languages of the world developed secondarily from naturally-emerged spoken languages. As such, spoken languages are usually the more relevant focus to the study of human history, the origin of language, and language acquisition.

== Definition ==
The term "spoken language" is sometimes used to mean only oral languages, especially by linguists, excluding sign languages and making the terms 'spoken', 'oral', 'vocal language' synonymous. Others refer to sign language as "spoken", especially in contrast to written transcriptions of signs.

All spoken languages make use of distinct speech patterns, called phonemes, to distinguish and select words from a shared vocabulary. In oral languages, phonemes are sound patterns like vowels, consonants, and tones, whereas in sign languages, phonemes are distinct components of signs, such as location, handshape, and motion. The study of phonemes in spoken language is called phonology.

== Origin ==
The origin of language occurred early in human prehistory, before the invention of writing systems and therefore written language. The origin of language is thus synonymous with the origin of spoken language, whether it was oral or signed. Evidence from animal and primate communication suggests that human language developed from animal gestures and vocalizations produced by human ancestors.

Although non-human animals are capable of communication, humans are the only animals capable of using language. The organization of communication into a system of phonemes and the development of lexical rules capable of producing an infinite number of new messages (see digital infinity) are defining features which separate language from unstructured forms of communication. The exact process by which the structured systems of language developed is not known, as the process occurred before recorded history, and is the subject of several hypotheses in anthropology, linguistics, and evolutionary biology.

== Relation between spoken and written language ==
The relationship between spoken language and written language is complex. Within the fields of linguistics, the current consensus is that speech is an innate human capability, and written language is a cultural invention. However, some linguists, such as those of the Prague school, argue that written and spoken language possess distinct qualities which would argue against written language being dependent on spoken language for its existence.

== Acquiring spoken language ==
Hearing children acquire as their first language the language that is used around them, whether vocal, cued (if they are sighted), or signed. Deaf children can do the same with Cued Speech or sign language if either visual communication system is used around them. Vocal language is traditionally taught to them in the same way that written language must be taught to hearing children. (See oralism.) Teachers give particular emphasis on spoken language with children who speak a different primary language outside of the school. For the child it is considered important, socially and educationally, to have the opportunity to understand multiple languages.

== See also ==
- Body language
- Conversation
- Sociolinguistics
- Language acquisition
- List of language disorders
- Origin of speech
- Whistled language
- Phonocentrism
- Vernacular
- Teaching English as a second or foreign language
