= Thomas Sticht =

American cognitive scientist

Dr. Thomas Sticht taught at Harvard University. He was awarded UNESCO'S Mahatma Gandhi Medal for his twenty-five years of service and dedication.

After retiring in 1999 as the President and Senior Scientist at Applied Behavioral and Cognitive Sciences Inc, Sticht conducted workshops and lectures on adult education and professional development.

== Research ==
Sticht created Functional Context Training for the U.S. Military. His biggest contribution has been his research on improving the literacy skills for the new recruits of the United States Army, Navy, and Air Force.

Functional Context education is defined as instructional strategy that integrates the teaching of literacy skills and job content to move learner more successfully and quickly toward their education and employment goals. He later developed a training program to elevate literary skills in adult learners. Functional context training stresses on building upon prior knowledge to construct new concepts to accomplish difficult tasks. Sticht proposed that instructors should formulate better learning environments that incorporate real world situations to increase students' performance.

Sticht contributed to the field of Functional Context theory where he proposed that it was vital to make learning relevant to learners. The model of Cognitive system consisted of three components:

1. Knowledge based (prior knowledge of the learner)
2. Processing skills (problem solving, language skills, and learning strategies)
3. Information displays that present information.

The Functional Context approach recommends new assessment methods such as measuring functional learning and academic learning.

As a researcher, Sticht contributed to the research of early childhood education, and conducted the first conference on intergenerational transfer of cognitive skills. Many articles were published by him on the role of oral language and the transfer of literacy.

== Publications ==
Sticht contributed to over 170 books, inclusive of chapters, journals, articles, reports, and curriculum material books.

- Automotive Trades Knowledge Base (Glencoe Occupational Adult Learning Series) by Thomas G. Sticht and Barbara A. McDonald (June 1993)
- Construction Trades Knowledge Base (Glencoe Occupational Adult Learning Series) by Thomas G. Sticht, Barbara A. McDonald and Richard Flyer (June 1992)
- Electricity and Electronics Technology Knowledge Base (Glencoe Occupational Adult Learning) by Thomas G. Sticht and Barbara A. McDonald (December 1992)
- Health Occupations Knowledge Base (Glencoe Occupational Adult Learning Series) by Thomas G. Sticht and Barbara A. McDonald (January 1992)
- Office Technology (Glencoe occupational adult learning series) by Thomas Sticht (June 1992)
