= ASL-phabet =

Writing system for American Sign Language

- Script type: alphabet
- Languages: ASL

Related scripts
- Parent systems: Stokoe notation: ASL-phabet

ASL-phabet, or the ASL Alphabet, is a writing system developed by Samuel Supalla for American Sign Language (ASL). It is based on a system called SignFont, which Supalla modified and streamlined for use in an educational setting with Deaf children.

Like SignFont and Stokoe notation, ASL-phabet is a phonemic script, but it has been simplified to the point where there is some ambiguity, that is, one symbol can represent more than one phonemic element (handshape, location or movement). For example, whereas SignFont has 25 letters encoding types of movement, and Stokoe notation has 24, ASL-phabet has just 5. This can result in homographs (more than one sign spelled the same way).

All together, ASL-phabet has 22 letters for handshape, 5 for location, and 5 for movement. They are written in that order, left-to-right, with the possibility for several letters of each type, such as two handshape letters for a two-handed sign. Like Stokoe notation (but unlike SignFont), the ASL-phabet does not provide symbols for facial expressions, mouthing, and other aspects of sign language structure, which may make it hard to use for extended text. However, it is sufficient to look up ASL words in an ASL–English dictionary. Hulst & Channon (2010) note, "This system, much more than SignWriting, acknowledges the fact (rightly, we believe) that a written representation of a word does not need to be a recipe to produce it, but only to be sufficiently unique to act as a trigger to activate the relevant words in the reader's mind."

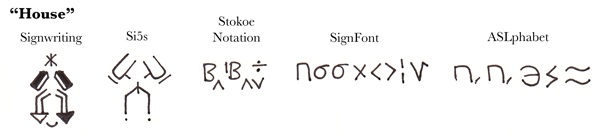
