= Beth S. Benedict =

American Professor, Advocate, Mentor

Beth S. Benedict is a professor in the Department of Communication Studies at Gallaudet University, advocate for the deaf, and a mentor for families with deaf children. Her research focuses on early intervention, early language acquisition, and family involvement. Benedict is also an advocate for the use of bilingualism in education of the deaf - incorporating the value of American Sign Language in deaf children. Benedict advocates for deaf-hearing partnerships, avoiding audism, the importance of bilingual education, deaf culture and the use of sign language while also working as a family mentor for families with deaf children. Recently, she was a keynote speaker for an International Deaf Studies conference and the featured speaker for the deaf education summit. Benedict takes what she researches about deafness and education and shares it broadly by way of talks and application - for example, she has helped the Georgia School for the Deaf work on developing bilingual education in their programs. In 2015 Benedict was the featured speaker at the Deaf education summit in Louisiana - a conference that brought together practitioners, educators, and parents to discuss local issues surrounding education of deaf children.

In a video Benedict explains how children who use sign language are not hindered in their ability to learn speech.

== Education ==
Benedict received her Bachelor of Arts degree in psychology from Gallaudet University in 1980. From there, she attended New York University to pursue a master's degree in communication, which she finished in 1981. After some time, Benedict returned to Gallaudet University to work on a doctoral degree in Education, which she completed in 2003.

== Career ==
Much of Benedict's work focuses on research and spreading knowledge about early childhood intervention and the usefulness of using American Sign Language. Below is a summary of some of her accomplishments:

- Vice President of the Joint Chair Committee on Infant Hearing.
- President of the American Society of Deaf Children for 2014.
- Member of the Council of Education of the Deaf.
- The Maryland Newborn Hearing Screening Advisory Council and is also actively involved in a variety of other EHDI initiatives.
- Recognized by the National Association of the Deaf (United States) as an educational advocate.
- Coordinator of the Deaf and Hard of Hearing Infants, Toddlers, and Families Interdisciplinary Graduate Certificate Program at Gallaudet University.

== Awards ==
Beth Benedict received the Antonia Brancia Maxon Award for EHDI Excellence in 2010 at the Early Hearing Detection and Intervention conference in Chicago, Illinois. The following lists other awards she has earned as a professional scholar:

- National Association of the Deaf Knights of the Flying Fingers Award, 2014
- Gallaudet University Student Affairs and Academic Support Dedicated Faculty Award, 2013
- Conference of Educational Administrators of Schools and Programs for the Deaf (CEASD) Board's top award, the Robert R. Davila Award of Merit, 2013
- National Association of the Deaf Randall McClelland Memorial Award, 2012
- Person of the Month, Deaf Life, April 2010
- Gallaudet University Alpha Sigma Pi Fraternity Woman of the Year, 2010
- Empire's Who's Who of Women in Education, 2005-2006
- National Association of the Deaf, Stokoe Scholarship, 2000 – 2001
- U.S. Office of Education and Rehabilitative Service Stipend Awards (4 consecutive years) 1996 – 2000
- Staff of the Year at Pre-College Programs, 1991

== Personal life ==
Benedict is married to A. Dwight Benedict (Dean of Student Affairs at Gallaudet) and has two Deaf daughters, Lauren and Rachel. She, her husband, and both of their daughters were involved in athletics during their time at Gallaudet - in 2012 their family was featured in Gallaudet's "Bison Legacy" series for families with a history of Deaf athletes
