= Mouthing =

Mouthing of syllables in sign language

In sign language, mouthing is the production of visual syllables with the mouth while signing. That is, signers sometimes say or mouth a word in a spoken language at the same time as producing the sign for it. Mouthing is one of the many ways in which the face and mouth is used while signing. Although not present in all sign languages, and not in all signers, where it does occur it may be an essential (that is, phonemic) element of a sign, distinguishing signs which would otherwise be homophones; in other cases a sign may seem to be flat and incomplete without mouthing even if it is unambiguous. Other signs use a combination of mouth movements and hand movements to indicate the sign; for example, the ASL sign for not-yet includes a mouth gesture where the mouth is slightly open.

Mouthing often originates from oralist education, where sign and speech are used together. Thus mouthing may preserve an often abbreviated rendition of the spoken translation of a sign. In educated Ugandan Sign Language, for example, where both English and Ganda are influential, the word for very, Av", is accompanied by the mouthed syllable nyo, from Ganda nnyo 'very', and abuse, jO*[5]v", is accompanied by vu, from Ganda onvuma. Similarly, the USL sign finish, t55bf, is mouthed fsh, an abbreviation of English finish, and deaf, }HxU, is mouthed df.

However, mouthing may also be iconic, as in the word for hot (of food or drink) in ASL, UtCbf", where the mouthing suggests something hot in the mouth and does not correspond to the English word "hot".

Mouthing is an essential element of cued speech and simultaneous sign and speech, both for the direct instruction of oral language and to disambiguate cases where there is not a one-to-one correspondence between sign and speech. However, mouthing does not always reflect the corresponding spoken word; when signing 'thick' in Auslan (Australian Sign Language), for example, the mouthing is equivalent to spoken fahth.

In a 2008 edition of Sign Language & Linguistics, there is a study that discusses similarities and differences in mouthing between three different European sign languages. It goes into detail about mouthings, adverbial mouth gestures, semantically empty mouth gestures, enacting mouth gestures, and whole face gestures.

Linguists do not agree on how to best analyze mouthing. It is an open question as to whether they form a part of the phonological system or whether they are a product of simultaneous code-blending. Another question is whether mouthings are an inherent part of the lexicon or not.

== See also ==
- Expression (sign language)
- Initialized sign
- Lip reading
