= Phoneme =

Basic unit of phonology

A phoneme (/ˈfoʊniːm/ FOH-neem) is any set of speech sounds that speakers of a language perceptually regard as a single basic sound that serves to distinguish one word from another. All languages contain phonemes (or the spatial–gestural equivalent in sign languages), and all spoken languages include both consonant and vowel phonemes.

Phonemes are traditionally represented, when written, as a glyph (a character) enclosed within two forward-sloping slashes /. For example, /ɒ/ indicates the vowel phoneme, or set of possible sounds, used in the middle of the English word pot. The exact pronunciation of this phoneme varies by accent, with the pronunciation [ɔ] in many British and Australian accents, [ɑ] in many US and Irish accents, and [a] in Great Lakes accents of the US. Still, /ɒ/ counts as one phoneme, across multiple such dialects, because it contrasts with, for example, the /ʊ/ of put or /ɪ/ of pit. Within linguistics, exact pronunciations are studied under phonetics, while the abstract concept of phonemes is studied under phonology.

== Overview ==
The words cell and set have the same sequence of sounds except for the final consonant: thus, /sɛl/ versus /sɛt/ in the International Phonetic Alphabet (IPA), which is a writing system that can be used to represent phonemes. Since /l/ and /t/ alone distinguish the spoken words cell and set, /l/ and /t/ are examples of phonemes of the English language. Specifically they are consonant phonemes, along with the /s/, while /ɛ/ is a vowel phoneme. English spelling does not always closely align with its phonemes. For example, the English words knot, nut, and gnat all share the consonant phonemes /n/ and /t/, differing only by their vowel phonemes: /ɒ/, /ʌ/, and /æ/, respectively. Another example of phonemic transcription is /pʊʃt/: the notation for a sequence of four phonemes—/p/, /ʊ/, /ʃ/, and /t/—that constitutes the pronunciation of the word pushed.

Phonemes, or word-distinguishing sounds (or sets of sounds), are perceived differently by users of one language versus another. For example, [n] and [ŋ] are separate phonemes in English as they distinguish words like sin from words like sing (/sɪn/ versus /sɪŋ/), but they constitute a single phoneme in other languages, such as Spanish, in which [pan] and [paŋ] for instance are interpreted by Spanish speakers as merely regional or dialect-specific pronunciations of the same word (pan: the Spanish word for "bread"). Such spoken variations of a single phoneme are known by linguists as allophones. On the other hand, [y] and [u] are usually heard as variations on one phoneme in English, though they are completely separate phonemes in other languages, like French, which distinguishes words such as rue, "street" /ʁy/ from roue, "wheel" /ʁu/.

Linguists use slashes in the IPA to transcribe phonemes, and square brackets to transcribe more precise pronunciation details, including allophones; they describe this distinction as phonemic (Note: Or more rarely, phonematic.) versus phonetic. Thus, the pronunciations of tap versus tab, or pat versus bat, can be represented phonemically and are written between slashes (/p/, /b/, etc.), while nuances of exactly how speakers pronounce /p/ are phonetic and written between brackets, such as [p] for the p in spit versus [pʰ] for the p in pit, which in English is an aspirated allophone of /p/ (i.e., pronounced with an extra burst of air).

== Conceptual basis; theory of the definition of phonemes ==
There are many views as to exactly what phonemes are and how a given language should be analyzed in phonemic terms. Generally, a phoneme is regarded as an abstraction of a set (or equivalence class) of spoken sound variations that are nevertheless perceived as a single basic unit of sound by the ordinary native speakers of a given language. While phonemes are considered abstracted, underlying representations for sound segments within words, the corresponding phonetic realizations of those phonemes—each phoneme with its various allophones—constitute the surface form that is actually uttered and heard. Allophones each have technically different articulations inside particular words or particular environments within words, yet these differences do not create any meaningful distinctions. Alternatively, at least one of those articulations could be feasibly used in all such words with these words still being recognized as such by users of the language. An example in American English is that the sound spelled with the symbol t is usually articulated with a glottal stop [ʔ] (or a similar glottalized sound) in the word cat, an alveolar flap [ɾ] in dating, an alveolar plosive [t] in stick, and an aspirated alveolar plosive [tʰ] in tie; however, American English speakers perceive or "hear" all of these sounds (usually with no conscious effort) as merely being allophones of a single phoneme: the one traditionally represented in the IPA as /t/.

For computer-typing purposes, systems such as X-SAMPA exist to represent IPA symbols using only ASCII characters. However, descriptions of particular languages may use different conventional symbols to represent the phonemes of those languages. For languages whose writing systems employ the phonemic principle, ordinary letters may be used to denote phonemes, although this approach is often imperfect, as pronunciations naturally shift in a language over time, rendering previous spelling systems outdated or no longer closely representative of the sounds of the language (see further the section headed § Correspondence between letters and phonemes, below).

== Assignment of speech sounds to phonemes ==
A simplified procedure for determining whether two sounds represent the same or different phonemes

A phoneme is a sound or a group of different sounds perceived to have the same function by speakers of the language or dialect in question. An example is the English phoneme /k/, which occurs in words such as cat, kit, scat, skit. Although most native speakers do not notice this, in most English dialects, the "c/k" sounds in these words are not identical: in kit [kʰɪt], the sound is aspirated, but in skill [skɪl], it is unaspirated. The words, therefore, contain different speech sounds, or phones, transcribed [kʰ] for the aspirated form and [k] for the unaspirated one. These different sounds are nonetheless considered to belong to the same phoneme, because if a speaker used one instead of the other, the meaning of the word would not change: using the aspirated form [kʰ] in skill might sound odd, but the word would still be recognized. By contrast, some other sounds would cause a change in meaning if substituted: for example, substitution of the sound [t] would produce the different word still, and that sound must therefore be considered to represent a different phoneme (the phoneme /t/).

The above shows that in English, [k] and [kʰ] are allophones of a single phoneme /k/. In some languages, however, [kʰ] and [k] are perceived by native speakers as significantly different sounds, and substituting one for the other can change the meaning of a word. In those languages, therefore, the two sounds represent different phonemes. For example, in Icelandic, [kʰ] is the first sound of kátur, meaning "cheerful", but [k] is the first sound of gátur, meaning "riddles". Icelandic, therefore, has two separate phonemes /kʰ/ and /k/.

=== Minimal pairs ===
A pair of words like kátur and gátur (above) that differ only in one phone is called a minimal pair for the two alternative phones in question (in this case, [kʰ] and [k]). The existence of minimal pairs is a common test to decide whether two phones represent different phonemes or are allophones of the same phoneme.

To take another example, the minimal pair tip and dip illustrates that in English, [tʰ] and [d] belong to separate phonemes, /t/ and /d/; since the words have different meanings, English-speakers must be conscious of the distinction between the two sounds.

Signed languages, such as American Sign Language (ASL), also have minimal pairs, differing only in (exactly) one of the signs' parameters: handshape, movement, location, palm orientation, and nonmanual signal or marker. A minimal pair may exist in the signed language if the basic sign stays the same, but one of the parameters changes.

However, the absence of minimal pairs for a given pair of phones does not always mean that they belong to the same phoneme: they may be so dissimilar phonetically that it is unlikely for speakers to perceive them as the same sound. For example, English has no minimal pair for the sounds [h] (as in hat) and [ŋ] (as in bang), and the fact that they can be shown to be in complementary distribution could be used to argue for their being allophones of the same phoneme. However, they are so dissimilar phonetically that they are considered separate phonemes. A case like this shows that sometimes it is the systemic distinctions and not the lexical context which are decisive in establishing phonemes. This implies that the phoneme should be defined as the smallest phonological unit which is contrastive at a lexical level or distinctive at a systemic level. (Note: See Fausto Cercignani, Some notes on phonemes and allophones in synchronic and diachronic descriptions, in "Linguistik online", 129/5, 2024, pp. 39–51, online)

Phonologists have sometimes had recourse to "near minimal pairs" to show that speakers of the language perceive two sounds as significantly different even if no exact minimal pair exists in the lexicon. It is challenging to find a minimal pair to distinguish English /ʃ/ from /ʒ/, yet it seems uncontroversial to claim that the two consonants are distinct phonemes. The two words pressure /ˈprɛʃər/ and pleasure /ˈplɛʒər/ can serve as a near minimal pair. The reason why this is still acceptable proof of phonemehood is that there is nothing about the additional difference (/r/ vs. /l/) that can be expected to somehow condition a voicing difference for a single underlying postalveolar fricative. One can, however, find true minimal pairs for /ʃ/ and /ʒ/ if less common words are considered. For example, Confucian and confusion are a valid minimal pair.

== Suprasegmental phonemes ==
Besides segmental phonemes such as vowels and consonants, there are also suprasegmental features of pronunciation (such as tone and stress, syllable boundaries and other forms of juncture, nasalization and vowel harmony), which, in many languages, change the meaning of words and so are phonemic.

Phonemic stress is encountered in languages such as English. For example, there are two words spelled invite: one is a verb and is stressed on the second syllable; the other is a noun and stressed on the first syllable (without changing any of the individual sounds). The position of the stress distinguishes the words and so a full phonemic specification would include indication of the position of the stress: /ɪnˈvaɪt/ for the verb, /ˈɪnvaɪt/ for the noun. In other languages, such as French, word stress cannot have this function (its position is generally predictable) and so it is not phonemic (and therefore not usually indicated in dictionaries).

Phonemic tones are found in languages such as Mandarin Chinese in which a given syllable can have five different tonal pronunciations:

The syllable ma with each of the primary tones in Standard Mandarin Chinese

Minimal set for phonemic tone in Mandarin Chinese
Tone number	1	2	3	4	5
Hanzi	媽	麻	馬	罵	嗎
Pinyin	mā	má	mǎ	mà	ma
IPA	[má]	[mǎ]	[mà] (Note: There is allophonic variation of this tone. It may be realized in different ways, depending on context.)	[mâ]	[ma]
Gloss	mother	hemp	horse	scold	question particle

The tone "phonemes" in such languages are sometimes called tonemes. Languages such as English do not have phonemic tone, but they use intonation for functions such as emphasis and attitude.

== Distribution of allophones ==
When a phoneme has more than one allophone, the one actually heard at a given occurrence of that phoneme may be dependent on the phonetic environment (surrounding sounds). Allophones that normally cannot appear in the same environment are said to be in complementary distribution. In other cases, the choice of allophone may be dependent on the individual speaker or other unpredictable factors. Such allophones are said to be in free variation, but allophones are still selected in a specific phonetic context, not the other way around.

== Background and related ideas ==
The term phonème (from Ancient Greek: φώνημα, romanized: phōnēma, "sound made, utterance, thing spoken, speech, language") was reportedly first used by A. Dufriche-Desgenettes in 1873, but it referred only to a speech sound. The term phoneme as an abstraction was developed by the Polish linguist Jan Baudouin de Courtenay and his student Mikołaj Kruszewski during 1875–1895. The term used by these two was fonema, the basic unit of what they called psychophonetics. Daniel Jones became the first linguist in the western world to use the term phoneme in its current sense, employing the word in his article "The phonetic structure of the Sechuana Language". The concept of the phoneme was then elaborated in the works of Nikolai Trubetzkoy and others of the Prague School (during the years 1926–1935), and in those of structuralists like Ferdinand de Saussure, Edward Sapir, and Leonard Bloomfield. Some structuralists (though not Sapir) rejected the idea of a cognitive or psycholinguistic function for the phoneme.

Later, the term was used and redefined in generative linguistics, most famously by Noam Chomsky and Morris Halle, and remains central to many accounts of the development of modern phonology. As a theoretical concept or model, though, it has been supplemented and even replaced by others.

Some linguists (such as Roman Jakobson and Morris Halle) proposed that phonemes may be further decomposable into features, such features being the true minimal constituents of language. Features overlap each other in time, as do suprasegmental phonemes in oral language and many phonemes in sign languages. Features could be characterized in different ways: Jakobson and colleagues defined them in acoustic terms, Chomsky and Halle used a predominantly articulatory basis, though retaining some acoustic features, while Ladefoged's system is a purely articulatory system apart from the use of the acoustic term "sibilant".

In the description of some languages, the term chroneme has been used to indicate contrastive length or duration of phonemes. In languages in which tones are phonemic, the tone phonemes may be called tonemes. Though not all scholars working on such languages use these terms, they are by no means obsolete.

By analogy with the phoneme, linguists have proposed other sorts of underlying objects, giving them names with the suffix -eme, such as morpheme and grapheme. These are sometimes called emic units. The latter term was first used by Kenneth Pike, who also generalized the concepts of emic and etic description (from phonemic and phonetic respectively) to applications outside linguistics.

== Restrictions on occurrence ==
Languages do not generally allow words or syllables to be built of any arbitrary sequences of phonemes. There are phonotactic restrictions on which sequences of phonemes are possible and in which environments certain phonemes can occur. Phonemes that are significantly limited by such restrictions may be called restricted phonemes.

In English, examples of such restrictions include the following:

- /ŋ/, as in sing, occurs only at the end of a syllable, never at the beginning (in many other languages, such as Māori, Swahili, Tagalog, Thai, and Setswana, /ŋ/ can appear word-initially).
- /h/ occurs only at the beginning of a syllable, never at the end (a few languages, such as Arabic and Romanian, allow /h/ syllable-finally).
- In non-rhotic dialects, /ɹ/ can occur immediately only before a vowel, never before a consonant.
- /w/ and /j/ occur only before a vowel, never at the end of a syllable (except in interpretations in which a word like boy is analyzed as /bɔj/).

Some phonotactic restrictions can alternatively be analyzed as cases of neutralization. See Neutralization and archiphonemes below, particularly the example of the occurrence of the three English nasals before stops.

== Biuniqueness ==
Biuniqueness is a requirement of classic structuralist phonemics. It means that a given phone, wherever it occurs, must unambiguously be assigned to one and only one phoneme. In other words, the mapping between phones and phonemes is required to be many-to-one rather than many-to-many. The notion of biuniqueness was controversial among some pre-generative linguists and was prominently challenged by Morris Halle and Noam Chomsky in the late 1950s and early 1960s.

An example of the problems arising from the biuniqueness requirement is provided by the phenomenon of flapping in North American English. This may cause either /t/ or /d/ (in the appropriate environments) to be realized with the phone [ɾ] (an alveolar flap). For example, the same flap sound may be heard in the words hitting and bidding, although it is intended to realize the phoneme /t/ in the first word and /d/ in the second. This appears to contradict biuniqueness.

For further discussion of such cases, see the next section.

== Neutralization and archiphonemes ==
Phonemes that are contrastive in certain environments may not be contrastive in all environments. In the environments where they do not contrast, the contrast is said to be neutralized. In these positions it may become less clear which phoneme a given phone represents. Absolute neutralization is a phenomenon in which a segment of the underlying representation is not realized in any of its phonetic representations (surface forms). The term was introduced by Paul Kiparsky (1968), and contrasts with contextual neutralization where some phonemes are not contrastive in certain environments. Some phonologists prefer not to specify a unique phoneme in such cases, since to do so would mean providing redundant or even arbitrary information—instead they use the technique of underspecification. An archiphoneme is an object sometimes used to represent an underspecified phoneme.

An example of neutralization is provided by the Russian vowels /a/ and /o/. These phonemes are contrasting in stressed syllables, but in unstressed syllables the contrast is lost, since both are reduced to the same sound, usually [ə] (for details, see vowel reduction in Russian). In order to assign such an instance of [ə] to one of the phonemes /a/ and /o/, it is necessary to consider morphological factors (such as which of the vowels occurs in other forms of the words, or which inflectional pattern is followed). In some cases even this may not provide an unambiguous answer. A description using the approach of underspecification would not attempt to assign [ə] to a specific phoneme in some or all of these cases, although it might be assigned to an archiphoneme, written something like ⫽A⫽, which reflects the two neutralized phonemes in this position, or {a|o}, reflecting its unmerged values. (Note: Depending on the ability of the typesetter, this may be written vertically, an o over an a with a horizontal line (like a fraction) without the braces.)

A somewhat different example is found in English, with the three nasal phonemes /m, n, ŋ/. In word-final position these all contrast, as shown by the minimal triplet sum /sʌm/, sun /sʌn/, sung /sʌŋ/. However, before a stop such as /p, t, k/ (provided there is no morpheme boundary between them), only one of the nasals is possible in any given position: /m/ before /p/, /n/ before /t/ or /d/, and /ŋ/ before /k/, as in limp, lint, link (/lɪmp/, /lɪnt/, /lɪŋk/). The nasals are therefore not contrastive in these environments, and according to some theorists this makes it inappropriate to assign the nasal phones heard here to any one of the phonemes (even though, in this case, the phonetic evidence is unambiguous). Instead they may analyze these phonemes as belonging to a single archiphoneme, written something like ⫽N⫽, and state the underlying representations of limp, lint, link to be ⫽lɪNp⫽, ⫽lɪNt⫽, ⫽lɪNk⫽.

This latter type of analysis is often associated with Nikolai Trubetzkoy of the Prague school. Archiphonemes are often notated with a capital letter within double virgules or pipes, as with the examples ⫽A⫽ and ⫽N⫽ given above. Other ways the second of these has been notated include |m-n-ŋ|, {m, n, ŋ} and ⫽n*⫽.

Another example from English, but this time involving complete phonetic convergence as in the Russian example, is the flapping of /t/ and /d/ in some American English (described above under Biuniqueness). Here the words betting and bedding might both be pronounced [ˈbɛɾɪŋ]. Under the generative grammar theory of linguistics, if a speaker applies such flapping consistently, morphological evidence (the pronunciation of the related forms bet and bed, for example) would reveal which phoneme the flap represents, once it is known which morpheme is being used. However, other theorists would prefer not to make such a determination, and simply assign the flap in both cases to a single archiphoneme, written (for example) ⫽D⫽.

Further mergers in English are plosives after /s/, where /p, t, k/ conflate with /b, d, ɡ/, as suggested by the alternative spellings sketti and sghetti. That is, there is no particular reason to transcribe spin as /ˈspɪn/ rather than as /ˈsbɪn/, other than its historical development, and it might be less ambiguously transcribed ⫽ˈsBɪn⫽.

== Morphophonemes ==
A morphophoneme is a theoretical unit at a deeper level of abstraction than traditional phonemes, and is taken to be a unit from which morphemes are built up. A morphophoneme within a morpheme can be expressed in different ways in different allomorphs of that morpheme (according to morphophonological rules). For example, the English plural morpheme -s appearing in words such as cats and dogs can be considered to be a single morphophoneme, which might be transcribed (for example) ⫽z⫽ or |z|, and which is realized phonemically as /s/ after most voiceless consonants (as in cats) and as /z/ in other cases (as in dogs).

== Numbers of phonemes in different languages ==
All known languages use only a small subset of the many possible sounds that the human speech organs can produce, and, because of allophony, the number of distinct phonemes will generally be smaller than the number of identifiably different sounds. Different languages vary considerably in the number of phonemes they have in their systems (although apparent variation may sometimes result from the different approaches taken by the linguists doing the analysis). The total phonemic inventory in languages varies from as few as 9–11 in Pirahã and 11 in Rotokas to as many as 141 in ǃXũ.

The number of phonemically distinct vowels can be as low as two, as in Ubykh and Arrernte. At the other extreme, the Bantu language Ngwe has 14 vowel qualities, 12 of which may occur long or short, making 26 oral vowels, plus six nasalized vowels, long and short, making a total of 38 vowels; while !Xóõ achieves 31 pure vowels, not counting its additional variation by vowel length, by varying the phonation. As regards consonant phonemes, Puinave and the Papuan language Tauade each have just seven, and Rotokas has only six. !Xóõ, on the other hand, has somewhere around 77, and Ubykh 81. The English language uses a rather large set of 13 to 21 vowel phonemes, including diphthongs, although its 22 to 26 consonants are close to average. Across all languages, the average number of consonant phonemes per language is about 22, while the average number of vowel phonemes is about 8.

Some languages, such as French, have no phonemic tone or stress, while Cantonese and several of the Kam–Sui languages have six to nine tones (depending on how they are counted), and the Kam-Sui Dong language has nine to 15 tones by the same measure. One of the Kru languages, Wobé, has been claimed to have 14, though this is disputed.

The most common vowel system consists of the five vowels /i/, /e/, /a/, /o/, /u/. Languages with a five-vowel system span across the globe, and throughout unrelated language families. Some of the most notable five-vowel languages are Spanish, Serbo-Croatian, Hebrew, Tagalog, Hawaiian, and Japanese. The most common consonants are /p/, /t/, /k/, /m/, /n/. Relatively few languages lack any of these consonants, although it does happen: for example, Arabic lacks /p/, standard Hawaiian lacks /t/, Mohawk and Tlingit lack /p/ and /m/, Hupa lacks both /p/ and a simple /k/, colloquial Samoan lacks /t/ and /n/, while Rotokas and Quileute lack /m/ and /n/.

== Non-uniqueness of phonemic solutions ==
During the development of phoneme theory in the mid-20th century, phonologists were concerned not only with the procedures and principles involved in producing a phonemic analysis of the sounds of a given language, but also with the reality or uniqueness of the phonemic solution. These were central concerns of phonology. Some writers took the position expressed by Kenneth Pike: "There is only one accurate phonemic analysis for a given set of data", while others believed that different analyses, equally valid, could be made for the same data. Yuen Ren Chao (1934), in his article "The non-uniqueness of phonemic solutions of phonetic systems" stated that "given the sounds of a language, there are usually more than one possible way of reducing them to a set of phonemes, and these different systems or solutions are not simply correct or incorrect, but may be regarded only as being good or bad for various purposes". The linguist F. W. Householder referred to this argument within linguistics as "God's Truth" (i.e. the stance that a given language has an intrinsic structure to be discovered) vs. "hocus-pocus" (i.e., the stance that any proposed, coherent structure is as good as any other).

Different analyses of the English vowel system may be used to illustrate this. The article English phonology states that "English has a particularly large number of vowel phonemes" and that "there are 20 vowel phonemes in Received Pronunciation, 14–16 in General American and 20–21 in Australian English". Although these figures are often quoted as fact, they actually reflect just one of many possible analyses, and later in the English Phonology article an alternative analysis is suggested in which some diphthongs and long vowels may be interpreted as comprising a short vowel linked to either /j/ or /w/. The fullest exposition of this approach is found in Trager and Smith (1951), where all long vowels and diphthongs ("complex nuclei") are made up of a short vowel combined with either /j/, /w/ or /h/ (plus /r/ for rhotic accents), each comprising two phonemes. The transcription for the vowel normally transcribed /aɪ/ would instead be /aj/, /aʊ/ would be /aw/ and /ɑː/ would be /ah/, or /ar/ in a rhotic accent if there is an ⟨r⟩ in the spelling. It is also possible to treat English long vowels and diphthongs as combinations of two vowel phonemes, with long vowels treated as a sequence of two short vowels, so that "palm" would be represented as /paam/. English can thus be said to have around seven vowel phonemes, or even six if schwa were treated as an allophone of /ʌ/ or of other short vowels.

In the same period there was disagreement about the correct basis for a phonemic analysis. The structuralist position was that the analysis should be made purely on the basis of the sound elements and their distribution, with no reference to extraneous factors such as grammar, morphology or the intuitions of the native speaker; this position is strongly associated with Leonard Bloomfield. Zellig Harris claimed that it is possible to discover the phonemes of a language purely by examining the distribution of phonetic segments. Referring to mentalistic definitions of the phoneme, Twaddell (1935) stated "Such a definition is invalid because (1) we have no right to guess about the linguistic workings of an inaccessible "mind", and (2) we can secure no advantage from such guesses. The linguistic processes of the "mind" as such are quite simply unobservable; and introspection about linguistic processes is notoriously a fire in a wooden stove." This approach was opposed to that of Edward Sapir, who gave an important role to native speakers' intuitions about where a particular sound or group of sounds fitted into a pattern. Using English [ŋ] as an example, Sapir argued that, despite the superficial appearance that this sound belongs to a group of three nasal consonant phonemes (/m/, /n/ and /ŋ/), native speakers feel that the velar nasal is really the sequence [ŋɡ]/. The theory of generative phonology which emerged in the 1960s explicitly rejected the structuralist approach to phonology and favoured the mentalistic or cognitive view of Sapir.

These topics are discussed further in English phonology#Controversial issues.

== Correspondence between letters and phonemes ==
Phonemes are considered to be the basis for alphabetic writing systems. In such systems the written symbols (graphemes) represent, in principle, the phonemes of the language being written. This is most obviously the case when the alphabet was invented with a particular language in mind; for example, the Latin alphabet was devised for Classical Latin, and therefore the Latin of that period enjoyed a near one-to-one correspondence between phonemes and graphemes in most cases, though the devisers of the alphabet chose not to represent the phonemic effect of vowel length. However, because changes in the spoken language are often not accompanied by changes in the established orthography (as well as other reasons, including dialect differences, the effects of morphophonology on orthography, and the use of foreign spellings for some loanwords), the correspondence between spelling and pronunciation in a given language may be highly distorted; this is the case with English, for example.

The correspondence between symbols and phonemes in alphabetic writing systems is not necessarily a one-to-one correspondence. A phoneme might be represented by a combination of two or more letters (digraph, trigraph, etc.), like ⟨sh⟩ in English or ⟨sch⟩ in German (both representing the phoneme /ʃ/). Also a single letter may represent two phonemes, as in English ⟨x⟩ representing /gz/ or /ks/. There may also exist spelling/pronunciation rules (such as those for the pronunciation of ⟨c⟩ in Italian) that further complicate the correspondence of letters to phonemes, although they need not affect the ability to predict the pronunciation from the spelling and vice versa, provided the rules are consistent.

== Phonemes in sign languages ==
Sign language phonemes are bundles of articulation features. Stokoe was the first scholar to describe the phonemic system of ASL. He identified the bundles tab (elements of location, from Latin tabula), dez (the handshape, from designator), and sig (the motion, from signation). Some researchers also discern ori (orientation), facial expression, or mouthing. Just as with spoken languages, when features are combined, they create phonemes. As in spoken languages, sign languages have minimal pairs which differ in only one phoneme. For instance, the ASL signs for father and mother differ minimally with respect to location while handshape and movement are identical; location is thus contrastive.

Stokoe's terminology and notation system are no longer used by researchers to describe the phonemes of sign languages; William Stokoe's research, while still considered seminal, has been found not to characterize American Sign Language or other sign languages sufficiently. For instance, non-manual features are not included in Stokoe's classification. More sophisticated models of sign language phonology have since been proposed by Brentari, Sandler, and Van der Kooij.

=== Chereme ===
Cherology and chereme (from Ancient Greek: χείρ 'hand') are synonyms of phonology and phoneme which were previously used in the study of sign languages. The terms were coined in 1960 by William Stokoe at Gallaudet University, who sought to describe sign languages and their constituent parts as true and full languages. Once a controversial idea, the position is now universally accepted in linguistics. Stokoe's terminology, however, has been largely abandoned.

Cheremes, as the basic units of signed communication, are functionally and psychologically equivalent to phonemes in oral languages. Cherology, as the study of cheremes in language, is thus equivalent to phonology. These cher-root terms have thus been deprecated or replaced in the academic literature and elsewhere. Instead, the terms phonology and phoneme (or distinctive feature) are used, which in turn tends to stress the linguistic similarities between signed and spoken languages.

== See also ==
- Alphabetic principle – Predictable and systematic relationship between letters and spoken sounds
- Alternation (linguistics) – Alternate phonetic realization of a morpheme
- Diaphoneme – Concept in dialectology analyzing phonemes across dialects of a language
- Diphone – Adjacent pair of phones
- Initial-stress-derived noun – Phonological process
- Phonological change – Phenomenon in phonology
- Sphoṭa – How the mind orders linguistic units into coherent discourse and meaning
- Triphone – Sequence of three consecutive phones
- Viseme – Any of several speech sounds that look the same, for example when lip reading
