= American Sign Language =

Sign language predominantly used in the US

- Visual American Sign Language
- Native to: United States, Canada
- Region: Northern America
- Signers: Native signers: 730,000 (2006); L2 signers: 130,000 (2006)
- Language family: Francosign: Mixed: LSF, Martha's Vineyard Sign Language, Hand Talk, and Home signs; American Sign Language
- Dialects: Protactile; Black American Sign Language; see Varieties of American Sign Language
- Writing system: None widely accepted si5s (ASLwrite), ASL-phabet, Stokoe notation, SignWriting

Official status
- Official language in: None
- Recognised minority language in: Through legislation: Canada (federal); Saskatchewan (provincial); Ontario (provincial) only in domains of: legislation, education and judiciary proceedings. through resolutions: Alberta, Manitoba. 45 US states and DC formally recognize ASL in state law; Five states recognize ASL for educational foreign language requirements, but have not formally recognized ASL as a language.

Language codes
- ISO 639-3: ase
- Glottolog: asli1244 ASL family amer1248 ASL proper
- Areas where ASL or a dialect or derivative is the national sign language Areas where ASL is in significant use alongside another sign language

- Map of the North American Francosign languages. ASL covers the regions enclosed by the dashed line.

American Sign Language (ASL) is a natural language that serves as the predominant sign language of Deaf communities in the United States and most of Anglophone Canada. ASL is a complete and organized visual language that is expressed by employing both manual and nonmanual features. Besides North America, dialects of ASL and ASL-based creoles are used in many countries around the world, including much of West Africa and parts of Southeast Asia. ASL is also widely learned as a second language, serving as a lingua franca within the deaf world. ASL is most closely related to French Sign Language (LSF), thought to make up around 60% of the language's total signs. It has been proposed that ASL is a creole language of LSF, although ASL shows features atypical of creole languages, such as agglutinative morphology.

ASL is not based on English; it has its own grammar and vocabulary. ASL is not a universal language; there are between 200 and 300 officially recognized signed languages around the world, and ASL is one of those languages.

== Basic history ==
ASL originated in the early 19th century in the American School for the Deaf in Hartford, Connecticut, from a situation of language contact. Since then, ASL use has been propagated widely by schools for the deaf and deaf community organizations. Despite its wide use, no accurate count of ASL users has been taken. Reliable estimates for American ASL users range from 250,000 to 500,000 persons, including a number of children of deaf adults (CODA) and other hearing individuals.

Signs in ASL have a number of phonemic components, such as movement of the face, the torso, shoulders, and the hands. ASL is not a form of pantomime, although iconicity plays a larger role in ASL than in spoken languages. English loan words are often borrowed through fingerspelling, although ASL grammar is unrelated to that of English. ASL has verbal agreement and aspectual marking and has a productive system of forming agglutinative classifiers. Many linguists believe ASL to be a subject–verb–object language. However, there are several other proposals to account for ASL word order.

== Classification ==
Travis Dougherty explains and demonstrates the ASL alphabet. Voice-over interpretation by Gilbert G. Lensbower.

ASL emerged as a language at the American School for the Deaf, co-founded by Thomas Gallaudet and Laurent Clerc in 1817, which brought together Old French Sign Language, several indigenous sign languages, Martha's Vineyard sign language, and various home sign systems. ASL was created in that situation by language contact. (Note: In particular, Martha's Vineyard Sign Language, Henniker Sign Language, and Sandy River Valley Sign Language were brought to the school by students. They, in turn, appear to have been influenced by early British Sign Language and did not involve input from indigenous Native American sign systems. See Padden (2010:11), Lane, Pillard & French (2000:17), and Johnson & Schembri (2007:68).) ASL is influenced by its forerunners, yet linguistically distinct.

The influence of French Sign Language (LSF) on ASL is readily apparent; for example, it has been found that about 58% of signs in modern ASL are cognates to Old French Sign Language signs. However, that is far less than the standard 80% measure used to determine whether related languages are actually dialects. That suggests nascent ASL was highly affected by the other signing systems brought by the ASD students although the school's original director, Laurent Clerc, taught in LSF. In fact, Clerc reported that he often learned the students' signs rather than conveying LSF:

I see, however, and I say it with regret, that any efforts that we have made or may still be making, to do better than, we have inadvertently fallen somewhat back of Abbé de l'Épée. Some of us have learned and still learn signs from uneducated pupils, instead of learning them from well instructed and experienced teachers.

— Clerc, 1852, from Woodward 1978:336

It has been proposed that ASL is a creole in which LSF is the superstrate language and the native indigenous sign languages are substrate languages. However, more recent research has shown that modern ASL does not share many of the structural features that characterize creole languages. ASL may have begun as a creole and then undergone structural change over time, but it is also possible that it was never a creole-type language to begin with. There are modality-specific reasons that signed languages tend towards agglutination, such as the ability to simultaneously convey information via the face, head, torso, and other body parts. That might override creole characteristics such as the tendency towards isolating morphology. Additionally, Laurent Clerc and Thomas Hopkins Gallaudet may have used an artificially constructed form of manually coded language in instruction rather than true LSF.

Although the United States, the United Kingdom, and Australia share English as a common oral and written language, ASL is not mutually intelligible with either British Sign Language (BSL) or Auslan. All three languages show degrees of borrowing from English, but that alone is not sufficient for cross-language comprehension. However, that does not seem justified historically for ASL and Auslan, and it is likely that the resemblance is caused by the higher degree of iconicity in sign languages in general as well as contact with English.

American Sign Language is growing in popularity in many states. Many high school and university students desire to take it as a foreign language. This increased interest is also reflected beyond education, with ASL appearing more frequently in mainstream media through adaptations in film and popular media. ASL has also gained greater public visibility through social media and online platforms, where deaf and hard-of-hearing users share educational content and resources for learning the language. Research on video-sharing platforms such as TikTok has found that there are opportunities for ASL users to create and distribute sign language content to wider audiences.

ASL users, however, have a very distinct culture. Their facial expressions and hand movements reflect what they are communicating. They also have their own sentence structure, which sets the language apart from other spoken and signed languages. ASL allows information to be expressed spatially, with meaning that is conveyed through the placement and movement of signs in relation to one another rather than through a strictly linear sequence.

American Sign Language is now being accepted by many colleges as a language eligible for foreign language course credit; many states are making it mandatory to accept it as such. In some states however, this is only true with regard to high school coursework. Organizations such as the American Sign Language Teachers Association support ASL education by providing professional development, certification and networking opportunities for teachers of ASL and Deaf Studies.

== History ==
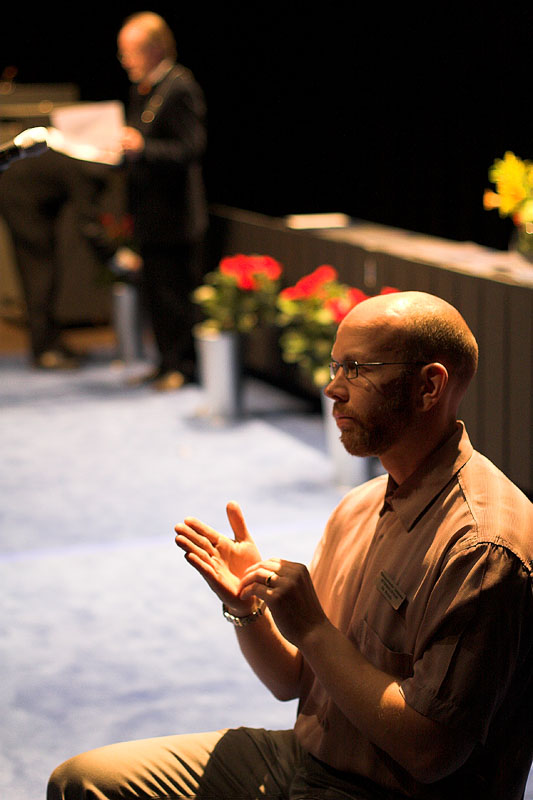
A sign language interpreter at a presentation

Prior to the birth of ASL, sign language had been used by various communities in the United States. In the United States, as elsewhere in the world, hearing families with Deaf children have historically employed ad hoc home sign, which often reaches much higher levels of sophistication than gestures used by hearing people in spoken conversation. As early as 1541 at first contact by Francisco Vásquez de Coronado, there were reports that the Indigenous peoples of the Great Plains widely spoke a sign language to communicate across vast national and linguistic lines.

In the 19th century, a "triangle" of indigenous sign languages developed in New England: one in Martha's Vineyard, Massachusetts; one in Henniker, New Hampshire, and one in Sandy River Valley, Maine. Martha's Vineyard Sign Language (MVSL), which was particularly important for the history of ASL, was used mainly in Chilmark, Massachusetts. Due to intermarriage in the original community of English settlers of the 1690s, and the recessive nature of genetic deafness, Chilmark had a high 4% rate of genetic deafness. MVSL was used even by hearing residents whenever a deaf person was present, and also in some situations where spoken language would be ineffective or inappropriate, such as during church sermons or between boats at sea.

ASL is thought to have originated in the American School for the Deaf, founded in Hartford, Connecticut, in 1817. Originally known as The American Asylum, At Hartford, For The Education And Instruction Of The Deaf And Dumb, the school was founded by the Yale graduate and divinity student Thomas Hopkins Gallaudet. Gallaudet, inspired by his success in demonstrating the learning abilities of a young deaf girl Alice Cogswell, traveled to Europe in order to learn Deaf pedagogy from European institutions. Ultimately, Gallaudet chose to adopt the methods of the French Institut National de Jeunes Sourds de Paris, and convinced Laurent Clerc, an assistant to the school's founder Charles-Michel de l'Épée, to accompany him back to the United States. (Note: The Abbé Charles-Michel de l'Épée, founder of the Parisian school Institut National de Jeunes Sourds de Paris, was the first to acknowledge that sign language could be used to educate the deaf. An oft-repeated folk tale states that while visiting a parishioner, Épee met two deaf daughters conversing with each other using LSF. The mother explained that her daughters were being educated privately by means of pictures. Épée is said to have been inspired by those deaf children when he established the first educational institution for the deaf.) Upon his return, Gallaudet and Clerc founded the ASD on April 15, 1817. In 2019, April 15 was declared as the National American Sign Language Day.

The largest group of students during the first seven decades of the school were from Martha's Vineyard, and they brought MVSL with them. There were also 44 students from around Henniker, New Hampshire, and 27 from the Sandy River valley in Maine, each of which had their own village sign language. (Note: Whereas deafness was genetically recessive on Martha's Vineyard, it was dominant in Henniker. On the one hand, this dominance likely aided the development of sign language in Henniker since families would be more likely to have the critical mass of deaf people necessary for the propagation of signing. On the other hand, in Martha's Vineyard the deaf were more likely to have more hearing relatives, which may have fostered a sense of shared identity that led to more inter-group communication than in Henniker.) Other students brought knowledge of their own home signs. Laurent Clerc, the first teacher at ASD, taught using French Sign Language (LSF), which itself had developed in the Parisian school for the deaf established in 1755. From that situation of language contact, a new language emerged, now known as ASL.

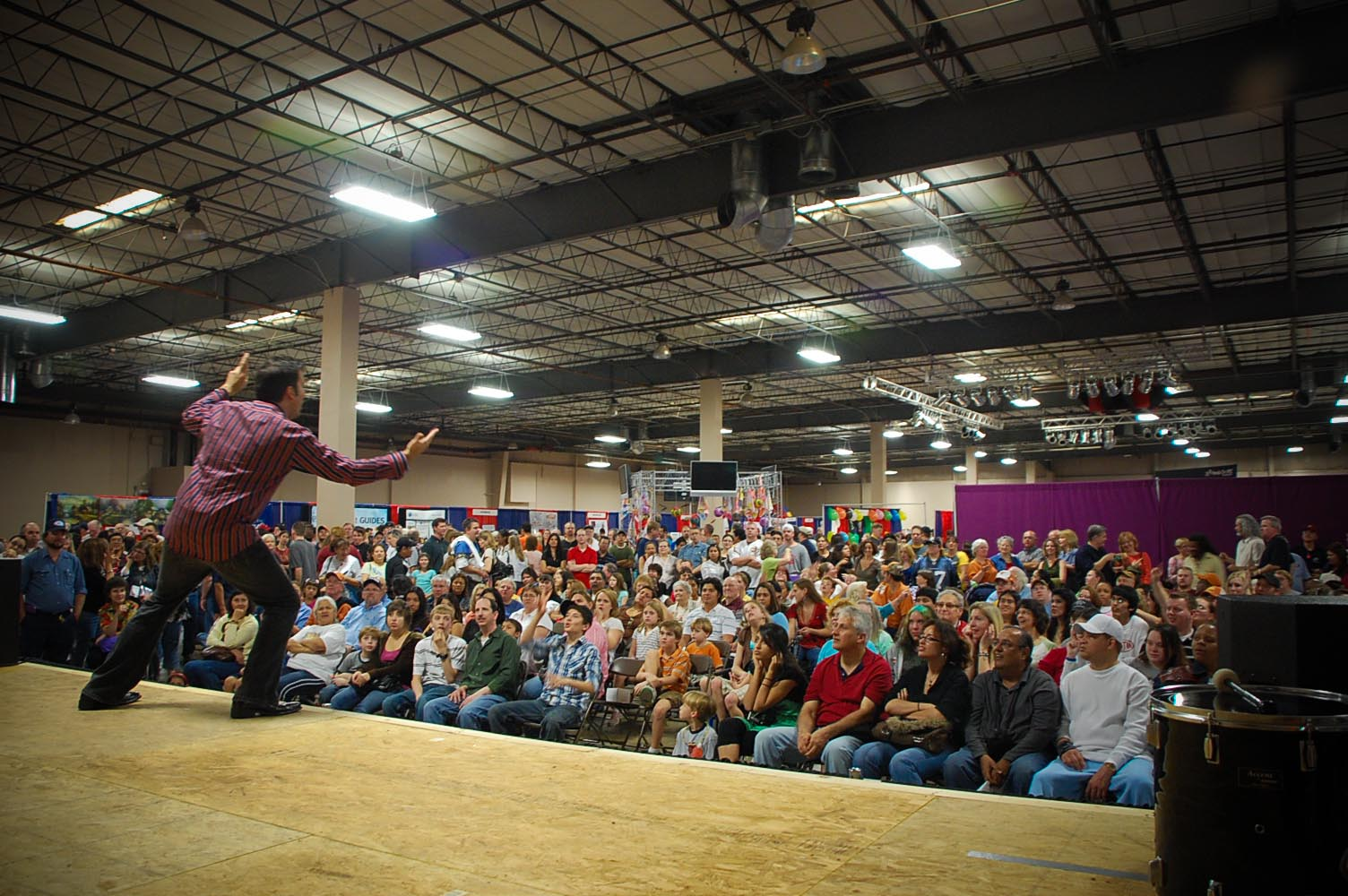
American Sign Language Convention of March 2008 in Austin, Texas

More schools for the Deaf were founded after ASD, and knowledge of ASL spread to those schools. In addition, the rise of deaf community organizations bolstered the continued use of ASL. Societies such as the National Association of the Deaf and the National Fraternal Society of the Deaf held national conventions that attracted signers from across the country. All of that contributed to ASL's wide use over a large geographical area, atypical of a sign language.

While oralism, an approach to educating deaf students focusing on oral language, had previously been used in American schools, the Milan Congress of 1880 made it dominant and effectively banned the use of sign languages at schools in the United States and Europe. However, the efforts of Deaf advocates and educators, more lenient enforcement of the self-appointed conference's congress's mandate, and the use of ASL in religious education and proselytism ensured greater use and documentation compared to European sign languages, albeit more influenced by fingerspelled loanwords and borrowed idioms from English as students were societally pressured to achieve fluency in spoken language. Nevertheless, oralism remained a predominant method of deaf education up to the 1950s. In response to the Milan Conference, the National Association for the Deaf (NAD) was established. As an additional response to the Milan Conference of 1880, the NAD created "Preservation of Sign Language" silent film was made to preserve the language. These films have been preserved in the US Library of Congress.

In the past, linguists did not consider American Sign Language to be true "language" but as something inferior. Recognition of the legitimacy of ASL was achieved by William Stokoe, a linguist who arrived at Gallaudet University in 1955 when that was still the dominant assumption. Aided by the Civil Rights Movement of the 1960s, Stokoe argued for manualism, the use of sign language in deaf education. Stokoe noted that American Sign Language shares the important features that oral languages have as a means of communication, and even devised a transcription system for ASL. In doing so, Stokoe revolutionized both deaf education and linguistics. In the 1960s, ASL was sometimes referred to as "Ameslan", but that term is now considered obsolete.

== Population ==
Counting the number of ASL signers is difficult because ASL users have never been counted by the American census. (Note: Although some surveys of smaller scope measure ASL use, such as the California Department of Education recording ASL use in the home when children begin school, ASL use in the general American population has not been directly measured. See Mitchell et al. (2006:1).) There have been proposals to add ASL as a language people could report they know other than English on the US census, but this was not listed as a language option on the census of 2020. The ultimate source for current estimates of the number of ASL users in the United States is a report for the National Census of the Deaf Population (NCDP) by Schein and Delk (1974). Based on a 1972 survey of the NCDP, Schein and Delk provided estimates consistent with a signing population between 250,000 and 500,000. The survey did not distinguish between ASL and other forms of signing; in fact, the name "ASL" was not yet in widespread use.

Incorrect figures are sometimes cited for the population of ASL users in the United States based on misunderstandings of known statistics. Demographics of the deaf population have been confused with those of ASL use since adults who become deaf late in life rarely use ASL in the home. That accounts for currently-cited estimations that are greater than 500,000; such mistaken estimations can reach as high as 15,000,000. A 100,000-person lower bound has been cited for ASL users; the source of that figure is unclear, but it may be an estimate of prelingual deafness, which is when a person is found to have hearing loss prior to acquiring their first language.

ASL is sometimes incorrectly cited as the third- or fourth-most-spoken language in the United States. Those figures misquote Schein and Delk (1974), who actually concluded that ASL speakers constituted the third-largest population "requiring an interpreter in court". Although that would make ASL the third-most used language among monolinguals other than English, it does not imply that it is the fourth-most-spoken language in the United States since speakers of other languages may also speak English.

== Geographic distribution ==
ASL is used throughout Anglo-America. That contrasts with Europe, where a variety of sign languages are used within the same continent. The unique situation of ASL seems to have been caused by the proliferation of ASL through schools influenced by the American School for the Deaf, wherein ASL originated, and the rise of community organizations for the Deaf.

Due in large part to the schools set up by African-American Deaf educator, Andrew Foster, ASL-based sign languages are signed by educated deaf adults throughout West Africa,. Such languages, imported by boarding schools, are often considered by associations to be the official sign languages of their countries and are named accordingly, such as Nigerian Sign Language and Ghanaian Sign Language. Such signing systems are found in Benin, Burkina Faso, Ivory Coast, Ghana, Liberia, Mauritania, Mali, Nigeria, and Togo. Due to lack of data, it is still an open question how similar those sign languages are to ASL used in America.

In addition to the aforementioned West African countries, ASL is reported to be used as a first language in Barbados, Bolivia, Cambodia (alongside Cambodian Sign Language), the Central African Republic, Chad, China (Hong Kong), the Democratic Republic of the Congo, Gabon, Jamaica, Kenya, Madagascar, the Philippines, Singapore, and Zimbabwe. ASL is also widely learned as a second language for many deaf people in the world.

== Regional variation ==
=== Sign production ===
American Sign Language production can vary according to location, which is also known as regional variation. Regional variation is natural and common among many signed and spoken languages. Based on a study published in 2002, signers from the American South tend to sign with more flow and ease. Native signers from New York have been reported as signing comparatively quicker and sharper. Sign production of native Californian signers has also been reported as being fast. Research on that phenomenon often concludes that the fast-paced production for signers from the coasts could be due to the fast-paced nature of living in large metropolitan areas. That conclusion also supports how the ease with which Southerners sign could be caused by the easygoing environment of the American South in comparison to that of the coasts.

Sign production can also vary depending on age and native language. For example, sign production of letters may vary in older signers. Slight differences in fingerspelling production can be a signal of age. Additionally, signers who learned American Sign Language as a second language vary in production. For deaf signers who learned a different sign language before learning American Sign Language, qualities of their native language may show in their ASL production. Some examples of that varied production include fingerspelling towards the body, instead of away from it, and signing certain movement from bottom to top, instead of top to bottom. Hearing people who learn American Sign Language also have noticeable differences in signing production. The most notable production difference of hearing people learning American Sign Language is their rhythm (prosody) and arm posture.

=== Sign variants ===
Most popularly, there are variants of the signs for words such as "birthday", "pizza", "Halloween", "early", and "soon", just a sample of the most commonly recognized signs with variants based on regional change. The sign for "school" is commonly varied between black and white signers due to previously segregated schools for the deaf. The racially segregated schools led to the development of two separate signed language varieties. Research is being done to see if Black American Sign Language (BASL) is its own separate language from ASL or a dialect. Social variation is also found between citation forms and forms used by deaf gay men for words such as "pain" and "protest".

=== History and implications ===
The prevalence of residential deaf schools can account for the slight regional variance of signs and sign productions across the United States. Deaf schools often serve students of the state in which the school resides. It is hypothesized that because of there being one or only a few deaf residential schools for the deaf, certain variants of a sign prevailed over others due to the choice of variant used by the student of the school/signers in the community. Prior to the invention of the internet, there was limited access to signers from other regions; however, this has changed with the invention of internet and the ability to view signs online.

However, American Sign Language does not appear to be vastly varied in comparison to other signed languages. That is because when deaf education was beginning in the United States, many educators flocked to the American School for the Deaf in Hartford, Connecticut, whose central location for the first generation of educators in deaf education to learn American Sign Language allows ASL to be more standardized.

== Varieties ==
Variants of ABOUT in Canadian ASL

About – General sign (Canadian ASL)

About – Atlantic Variation (Canadian ASL)

About – Ontario Variation (Canadian ASL)

Varieties of ASL are found throughout the world. There is little difficulty in comprehension among the varieties of the United States and Canada.

Just as there are accents in speech, there are regional accents in sign. People from the South sign slower than people in the North—even people from northern and southern Indiana have different styles.

— Walker, Lou Ann (1987). A Loss for Words: The Story of Deafness in a Family. New York: HarperPerennial. p. 31. ISBN 978-0-06-091425-7.

Mutual intelligibility among those ASL varieties is high, and the variation is primarily lexical. For example, there are three different words for English about in Canadian ASL; the standard way, and two regional variations (Atlantic and Ontario). Variation may also be phonological, meaning that the same sign may be signed in a different way depending on the region. For example, an extremely common type of variation is between the handshapes /1/, /L/, and /5/ in signs with one handshape.

There is also a distinct variety of ASL used by the Black Deaf community. Black ASL evolved as a result of racially segregated schools in some states, which included the residential schools for the Deaf. Black ASL differs from standard ASL in vocabulary, phonology, and some grammatical structure. While African American English (AAE) is generally viewed as more innovating than standard English, Black ASL is more conservative than standard ASL, preserving older forms of many signs. Black sign language speakers use more two-handed signs than in mainstream ASL, are less likely to show assimilatory lowering of signs produced on the forehead (e.g. KNOW) and use a wider signing space. Modern Black ASL borrows a number of idioms from AAE; for instance, the AAE idiom "I feel you" is calqued into Black ASL.

ASL is used internationally as a lingua franca, and a number of closely related sign languages derived from ASL are used in many different countries. Even so, there have been varying degrees of divergence from standard ASL in those imported ASL varieties. Bolivian Sign Language is reported to be a dialect of ASL, no more divergent than other acknowledged dialects. On the other hand, it is also known that some imported ASL varieties have diverged to the extent of being separate languages. For example, Malaysian Sign Language, which has ASL origins, is no longer mutually comprehensible with ASL and must be considered its own language. For some imported ASL varieties, such as those used in West Africa, it is still an open question how similar they are to ASL.

When communicating with hearing English speakers, ASL-speakers often use what is commonly called Pidgin Signed English (PSE) or 'contact signing', a blend of English structure with ASL vocabulary. However, there are modes of communication that are not officially a language such as Manual Code of English, such as Pidgin Signed English or Contact Sign, Signing Exact English. To codeswitch for not fluent ASL users, some deaf people use some of these modes of communication to help hearing people understand. Various types of PSE exist, ranging from highly English-influenced PSE (practically relexified English) to PSE which is quite close to ASL lexically and grammatically, but may alter some subtle features of ASL grammar. Fingerspelling may be used more often in PSE than it is normally used in ASL. There have been some constructed sign languages, known as Manually Coded English (MCE), which match English grammar exactly and simply replace spoken words with signs; those systems are not considered to be varieties of ASL.

Tactile ASL (TASL) is a variety of ASL used throughout the United States by and with the DeafBlind. It is particularly common among those with Usher's syndrome 1. It results in deafness from birth followed by loss of vision later in life; consequently, those with Usher's syndrome 1 often grow up in the deaf community using ASL, and later transition to TASL. Usher syndrome 2 is when someone is born with deafness and low vision. Both types of Usher's Syndrome could result in the DeafBlind person preferring to use TASL as a method of communication. TASL differs from ASL in that signs are produced by touching the palms, and there are some grammatical differences from standard ASL in order to compensate for the lack of nonmanual signing.

ASL changes over time and from generation to generation. The sign for telephone has changed as the shape of phones and the manner of holding them have changed. The development of telephones with screens has also changed ASL, encouraging the use of signs that can be seen on small screens.

== Stigma ==
In 2013, the White House published a response to a petition that gained over 37,000 signatures to officially recognize American Sign Language as a community language and a language of instruction in schools. The response is titled "there shouldn't be any stigma about American Sign Language" and addressed that ASL is a vital language for the deaf and hard of hearing. Stigmas associated with sign languages and the use of sign for educating children often lead to the absence of sign during periods in children's lives when they can access languages most effectively. Scholars such as Beth S. Benedict advocate not only for bilingualism (using ASL and English training) but also for early childhood intervention for children who are deaf. York University psychologist Ellen Bialystok has also campaigned for bilingualism, arguing that those who are bilingual acquire cognitive skills that may help to prevent dementia later in life.

Most children born to deaf parents are hearing and are also known as CODAs ("Children of Deaf Adults"). Some CODAs acquire ASL as well as Deaf cultural values and behaviors from birth from their deaf parents. Such bilingual hearing children may be mistakenly labeled as being "slow learners" or as having "language difficulties" because of preferential attitudes towards spoken language.

== Writing systems ==
The ASL phrase "American Sign Language", written in Stokoe notation

Although there is no well-established writing system for ASL, written sign language dates back almost two centuries. The first systematic writing system for a sign language seems to be that of Roch-Ambroise Auguste Bébian, developed in 1825. However, written sign language remained marginal among the public. In the 1960s, linguist William Stokoe created Stokoe notation specifically for ASL. It is alphabetic, with a letter or diacritic for every phonemic (distinctive) hand shape, orientation, motion, and position, though it lacks any representation of facial expression, and is better suited for individual words than for extended passages of text. Stokoe used that system for his 1965 A Dictionary of American Sign Language on Linguistic Principles.

The ASL phrase "American Sign Language", written in SignWriting

SignWriting, proposed in 1974 by Valerie Sutton, is the first writing system to gain use among the public and the first writing system for sign languages to be included in the Unicode Standard. SignWriting consists of more than 5000 distinct iconic graphs/glyphs. Currently, it is in use in many schools for the deaf, particularly in Brazil, and has been used in International Sign forums with speakers and researchers in more than 40 countries, including Brazil, Ethiopia, France, Germany, Italy, Portugal, Saudi Arabia, Slovenia, Tunisia, and the United States. Sutton SignWriting has both a printed and an electronically produced form so that persons can use the system anywhere that oral languages are written (personal letters, newspapers, and media, academic research). The systematic examination of the International Sign Writing Alphabet (ISWA) as an equivalent usage structure to the International Phonetic Alphabet for spoken languages has been proposed. According to some researchers, SignWriting is not a phonemic orthography and does not have a one-to-one map from phonological forms to written forms. That assertion has been disputed, and the process for each country to look at the ISWA and create a phonemic/morphemic assignment of features of each sign language was proposed by researchers Msc. Roberto Cesar Reis da Costa and Madson Barreto in a thesis forum on June 23, 2014. The SignWriting community has an open project on Wikimedia Labs to support the various Wikimedia projects on Wikimedia Incubator and elsewhere involving SignWriting. The ASL Wikipedia request was marked as eligible in 2008 and the test ASL Wikipedia has 50 articles written in ASL using SignWriting.

The most widely used transcription system among academics is HamNoSys, developed at the University of Hamburg. Based on Stokoe Notation, HamNoSys was expanded to about 200 graphs in order to allow transcription of any sign language. Phonological features are usually indicated with single symbols, though the group of features that make up a handshape is indicated collectively with a symbol.

Several additional candidates for written ASL have appeared over the years, including SignFont, ASL-phabet, and Si5s.

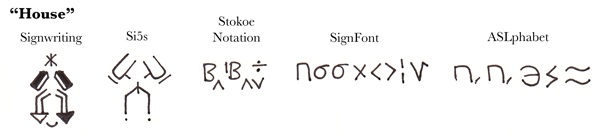
Comparison of ASL writing systems: Sutton SignWriting, Si5s, Stokoe notation, SignFont, and ASLphabet

For English-speaking audiences, ASL is often glossed using English words. Such glosses are typically all-capitalized and are arranged in ASL order. For example, the ASL sentence DOG NOW CHASE>IX=3 CAT, meaning "the dog is chasing the cat", uses NOW to mark ASL progressive aspect and shows ASL verbal inflection for the third person (>IX=3). However, glossing is not used to write the language for speakers of ASL.

== Phonology ==
Distinctive features in ASL

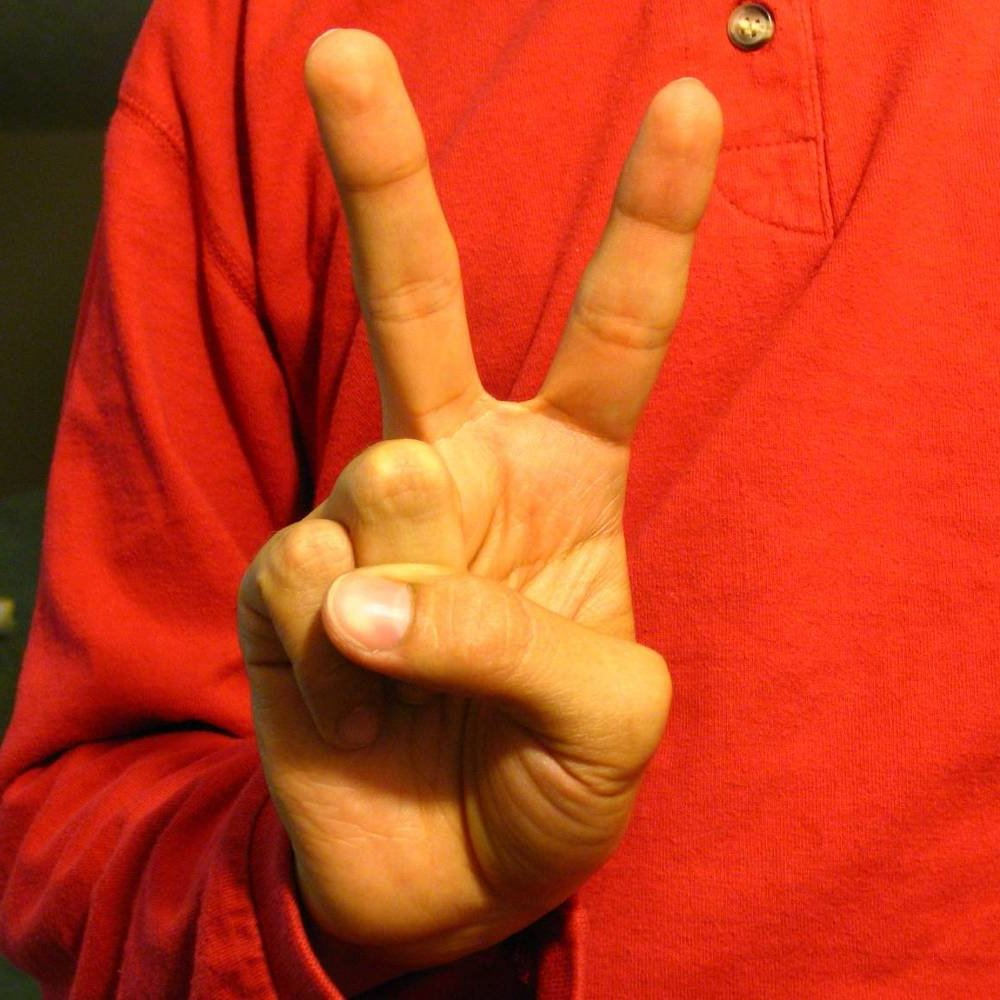
Phonemic handshape /2/
[+ closed thumb]

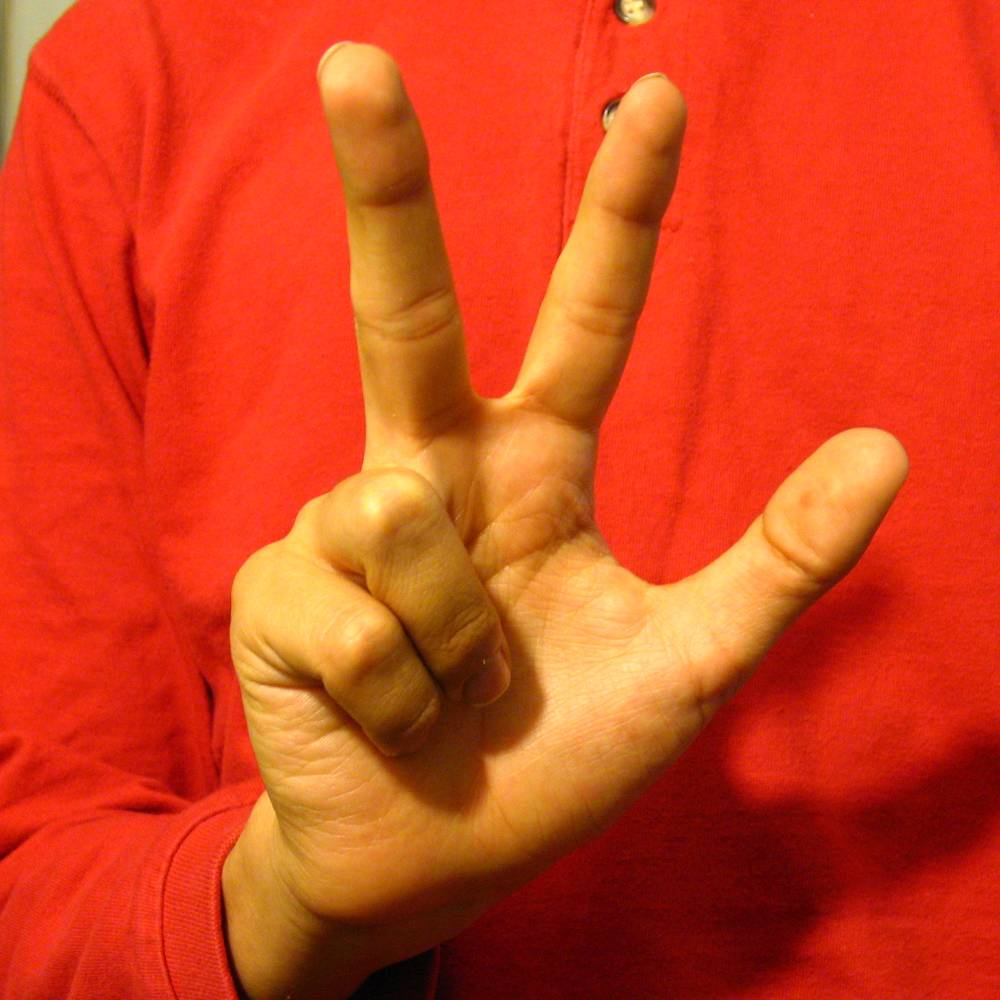
Phonemic handshape /3/
[− closed thumb]

Each sign in ASL is composed of a number of distinctive components, generally referred to as parameters. All signs can be described using the five parameters involved in signed languages, which are handshape, movement, palm orientation, location and nonmanual markers. A sign may use one hand or both hands. Just as phonemes of sound distinguish meaning in spoken languages, those parameters are the phonemes that distinguish meaning in signed languages like ASL. Changing any one of the parameters of a sign may change the meaning of a sign, as illustrated by the ASL signs THINK and DISAPPOINTED:

THINK
Handshape	Closed fist with index finger extended
Orientation	Facing signer's body
Location	Tip of finger in contact with forehead
Movement	Unidirectional single contacting movement

DISAPPOINTED
Handshape	(as for THINK)
Orientation	(as for THINK)
Location	Tip of finger in contact with chin
Movement	(as for THINK)

There are also meaningful nonmanual signals in ASL, which may include movement of the eyebrows, the cheeks, the nose, the head, the torso, and the eyes. These nonmanual features can indicate grammatical properties of the language.

William Stokoe proposed that such components are analogous to the phonemes of spoken languages. (Note: Stokoe himself termed them cheremes, but other linguists have referred to them as phonemes. See Bahan (1996:11).) There has also been a proposal that they are analogous to classes like place and manner of articulation. As in spoken languages, those phonological units can be split into distinctive features. For instance, the handshapes /2/ and /3/ are distinguished by the presence or absence of the feature [± closed thumb], as illustrated to the right. ASL has processes of allophony and phonotactic restrictions. There is ongoing research into whether ASL has an analog of syllables in spoken language.

== Grammar ==
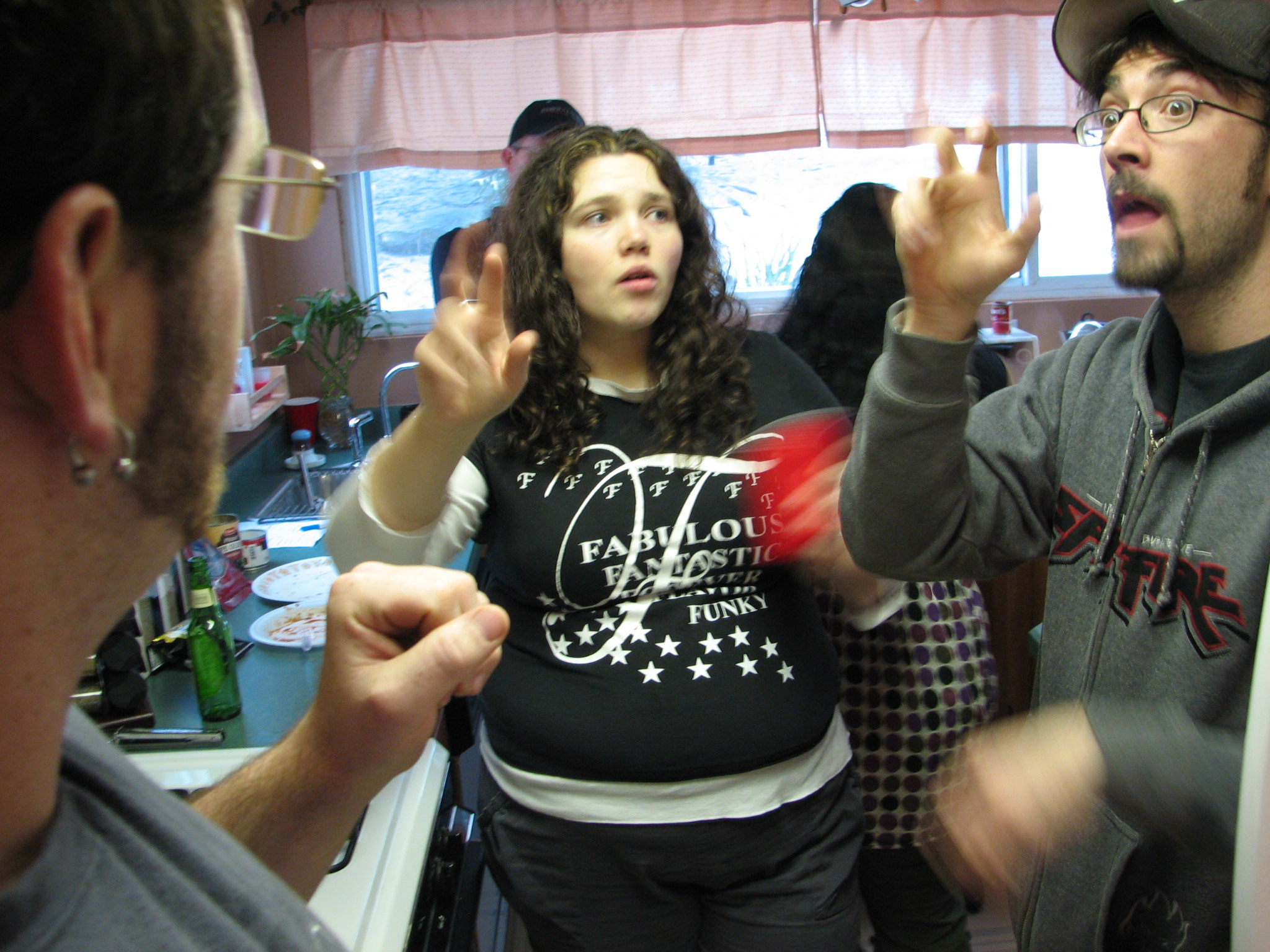
Two men and a woman signing

=== Morphology ===
ASL has a rich system of verbal inflection, which involves both grammatical aspect: how the action of verbs flows in time—and agreement marking. Aspect can be marked by changing the manner of movement of the verb; for example, continuous aspect is marked by incorporating rhythmic, circular movement, while punctual aspect is achieved by modifying the sign so that it has a stationary hand position. Verbs must agree with both the subject and the object, and are marked for number and reciprocity. Reciprocity is indicated by using two one-handed signs; for example, the sign SHOOT, made with an L-shaped handshape with inward movement of the thumb, inflects to SHOOT_{[reciprocal]}, articulated by having two L-shaped hands "shooting" at each other.

ASL has a productive system of classifiers, which are used to classify objects, their size and shape, and their movement in space. In the past, classifiers were known as Size and Shape Specifiers (SaSSes). For example, a rabbit running downhill would use a classifier consisting of a bent V classifier handshape with a downhill-directed path; if the rabbit is hopping, the path is executed with a bouncy manner. In general, classifiers are composed of a "classifier handshape" bound to a "movement root". The classifier handshape represents the object as a whole, incorporating such attributes as surface, depth, and shape, and is usually very iconic. The movement root consists of a path, a direction and a manner.

==== Fingerspelling ====
The American manual alphabet and numbers

Fingerspelling is a way in which sign languages manually represent the written systems of ambient languages of which they have frequent language contact. Orthographic symbols of those contact languages are represented through fingerspelling systems in sign languages.

Fingerspelling systems vary cross-linguistically in how they accommodate their ambient written systems, just as much as the written systems vary cross-linguistically themselves. For example, in American Sign Language, a one-handed fingerspelled system reflects the symbols of the Roman alphabet which is also used in many other signed languages around the world, mostly in Europe. In British Sign Language, the fingerspelled symbols represent the Roman alphabet but a two-handed system is used. In Japan, a one-handed system is used but the symbols represent a syllabary orthographic system.

Fingerspelled words can be used for numerous reasons, including but not limited to: proper nouns, emphasis, representation of loan words etc.

=== Syntax ===
ASL is a subject–verb–object (SVO) language, but various phenomena affect that basic word order. Basic SVO sentences are signed without any pauses:

FATHER LOVE CHILD
"The father loves the child."

However, other word orders may also occur since ASL allows the topic of a sentence to be moved to sentence-initial position, a phenomenon known as topicalization. In object–subject–verb (OSV) sentences, the object is topicalized, marked by a forward head-tilt and a pause:

CHILD^{topic}, FATHER LOVE
"The father loves the child."

Besides, word orders can be obtained through the phenomenon of subject copy in which the subject is repeated at the end of the sentence, accompanied by head nodding for clarification or emphasis:

FATHER LOVE CHILD FATHER^{copy}
"The father loves the child."

ASL also allows null subject sentences whose subject is implied, rather than stated explicitly. Subjects can be copied even in a null subject sentence, and the subject is then omitted from its original position, yielding a verb–object–subject (VOS) construction:

LOVE CHILD FATHER^{copy}
"The father loves the child."

Topicalization, accompanied with a null subject and a subject copy, can produce yet another word order, object–verb–subject (OVS).

CHILD^{topic}, LOVE FATHER^{copy}
"The father loves the child."

Those properties of ASL allow it a variety of word orders, leading many to question which is the true, underlying, "basic" order. There are several other proposals that attempt to account for the flexibility of word order in ASL. One proposal is that languages like ASL are best described with a topic–comment structure whose words are ordered by their importance in the sentence, rather than by their syntactic properties. Another hypothesis is that ASL exhibits free word order, in which syntax is not encoded in word order but can be encoded by other means such as head nods, eyebrow movement, and body position.

== Sign language interpretation ==
The American with Disabilities Act (ADA) requires public facilities to provide auxiliary aid such as sign language interpreters. Currently there is a database, the National Registry of Interpreters for the Deaf, to get qualified interpreters. Sign language interpreters are important for the Deaf and hard-of-hearing community to provide equal access to information in places that may not have written versions like concerts, education, and healthcare.

Not many places have interpreters available on call, with a 50:1 ratio of Deaf or hard-of-hearing person to ASL interpreter. This creates barriers for the Deaf community when looking at the social model of disability. Professional certification can be hard to obtain, and public facilities do not have to provide accommodation if it affects the service or becomes a burden.

== Iconicity ==
Common misconceptions are that signs are iconically self-explanatory, that they are a transparent imitation of what they mean, or even that they are pantomime. In fact, many signs bear no resemblance to their referent because they were originally arbitrary symbols, or their iconicity has been obscured over time. Even so, in ASL iconicity plays a significant role; a high percentage of signs resemble their referents in some way. That may be because the medium of sign, three-dimensional space, naturally allows more iconicity than oral language.

In the era of the influential linguist Ferdinand de Saussure, it was assumed that the mapping between form and meaning in language must be completely arbitrary. Although onomatopoeia is a clear exception, since words like "choo-choo" bear clear resemblance to the sounds that they mimic, the Saussurean approach was to treat them as marginal exceptions. ASL, with its significant inventory of iconic signs, directly challenges that theory.

Research on acquisition of pronouns in ASL has shown that children do not always take advantage of the iconic properties of signs when they interpret their meaning. It has been found that when children acquire the pronoun "you", the iconicity of the point (at the child) is often confused, being treated more like a name. That is a similar finding to research in oral languages on pronoun acquisition. It has also been found that iconicity of signs does not affect immediate memory and recall; less iconic signs are remembered just as well as highly-iconic signs.

== See also ==
- American Sign Language grammar – Linguistic description of the structure of ASL
- American Sign Language literature – Aspect of American literature
- Baby sign language – Signed language systems used with hearing infants/toddlers
- Bimodal bilingualism – Competency of two languages in different modalities
- Great ape language – Efforts to teach other apes human communication, of which ASL has been one attempted mode
- Inspirisles – 2021 tabletop role-playing game
- Legal recognition of sign languages
- Pointing – Gesture
- Sign name – Sign used to identify a person
- ASL interpreting – Translation of American Sign Language
- Bilingual–bicultural education – Deaf education programs that use sign language as the native language

== Bibliography ==
- Armstrong, David; Karchmer, Michael (2002), "William C. Stokoe and the Study of Signed Languages", in Armstrong, David; Karchmer, Michael; Van Cleve, John (eds.), The Study of Signed Languages, Gallaudet University, pp. xi–xix, ISBN 978-1-56368-123-3
- Bahan, Benjamin (1996). Non-Manual Realization of Agreement in American Sign Language (PDF). Boston University. Archived (PDF) from the original on October 11, 2017.
- Bailey, Carol; Dolby, Kathy (2002). The Canadian dictionary of ASL. Edmonton, AB: The University of Alberta Press. ISBN 978-0-88864-300-1.
- Bishop, Michele; Hicks, Sherry (2005). "Orange Eyes: Bimodal Bilingualism in Hearing Adults from Deaf Families". Sign Language Studies. 5 (2): 188–230. doi:10.1353/sls.2005.0001. S2CID 143557815.
- Collins, Steven (2004). Adverbial Morphemes in Tactile American Sign Language. Union Institute & University.
- Costello, Elaine (2008). American Sign Language Dictionary. Random House. ISBN 978-0-375-42616-2.
- Hurlbut, Hope (2003), "A Preliminary Survey of the Signed Languages of Malaysia", in Baker, Anne; van den Bogaerde, Beppie; Crasborn, Onno (eds.), Cross-linguistic perspectives in sign language research: selected papers from TISLR (PDF), Hamburg: Signum Verlag, pp. 31–46, archived (PDF) from the original on 2022-10-09
- Johnson, Trevor; Schembri, Adam (2007). Australian Sign Language (Auslan): An introduction to sign language linguistics. Cambridge University Press. ISBN 978-0-521-54056-8. Archived from the original on March 19, 2023.
- Kegl, Judy (2008). "The Case of Signed Languages in the Context of Pidgin and Creole Studies". In Kouwenberg, Silvia; Singler, John (eds.). The Handbook of Pidgin and Creole Studies. Blackwell Publishing. ISBN 978-0-521-54056-8. Archived from the original on March 19, 2023.
- Klima, Edward S.; Bellugi, Ursula (1979). The signs of language. Boston: Harvard University Press. ISBN 978-0-674-80796-9.
- Lane, Harlan; Pillard, Richard; French, Mary (2000). "Origins of the American Deaf-World". Sign Language Studies. 1 (1): 17–44. doi:10.1353/sls.2000.0003.
- Liddell, Scott (2002), "Modality Effects and Conflicting Agendas", in Armstrong, David; Karchmer, Michael; Van Cleve, John (eds.), The Study of Signed Languages, Gallaudet University, pp. xi–xix, ISBN 978-1-56368-123-3
- Lucas, Ceil; Bayley, Robert; Valli, Clayton (2003). What's your sign for pizza?: An introduction to variation in American Sign Language. Washington, DC: Gallaudet University Press. ISBN 978-1-56368-144-8.
- Mitchell, Ross; Young, Travas; Bachleda, Bellamie; Karchmer, Michael (2006). "How Many People Use ASL in the United States?: Why Estimates Need Updating" (PDF). Sign Language Studies. 6 (3). ISSN 0302-1475. Archived (PDF) from the original on 2022-10-09.
- Nyst, Victoria (2010), "Sign languages in West Africa", in Brentari, Diane (ed.), Sign Languages, Cambridge University Press, pp. 405–432, ISBN 978-0-521-88370-2
- Padden, Carol (2010), "Sign Language Geography", in Mathur, Gaurav; Napoli, Donna (eds.), Deaf Around the World (PDF), New York: Oxford University Press, pp. 19–37, ISBN 978-0-19-973253-1, archived from the original (PDF) on June 3, 2011
- Shaw, Emily; Delaporte, Yves (2015). A historical and etymological dictionary of American Sign Language: the origin and evolution of more than 500 signs. Washington, DC: Gallaudet University Press. ISBN 978-1-56368-622-1. OCLC 915119757.
- Solomon, Andrea (2010). Cultural and Sociolinguistic Features of the Black Deaf Community (Honors Thesis). Carnegie Mellon University. Archived from the original on April 3, 2012.
- Supalla, Samuel; Cripps, Jody (2011). "Toward Universal Design in Reading Instruction" (PDF). Bilingual Basics. 12 (2). Archived (PDF) from the original on 2015-09-10.
- Valli, Clayton; Lucas, Ceil (2000). Linguistics of American Sign Language. Gallaudet University Press. ISBN 978-1-56368-097-7.
- van der Hulst, Harry; Channon, Rachel (2010), "Notation systems", in Brentari, Diane (ed.), Sign Languages, Cambridge University Press, pp. 151–172, ISBN 978-0-521-88370-2
