= William Stokoe =

American linguist (1919–2000)

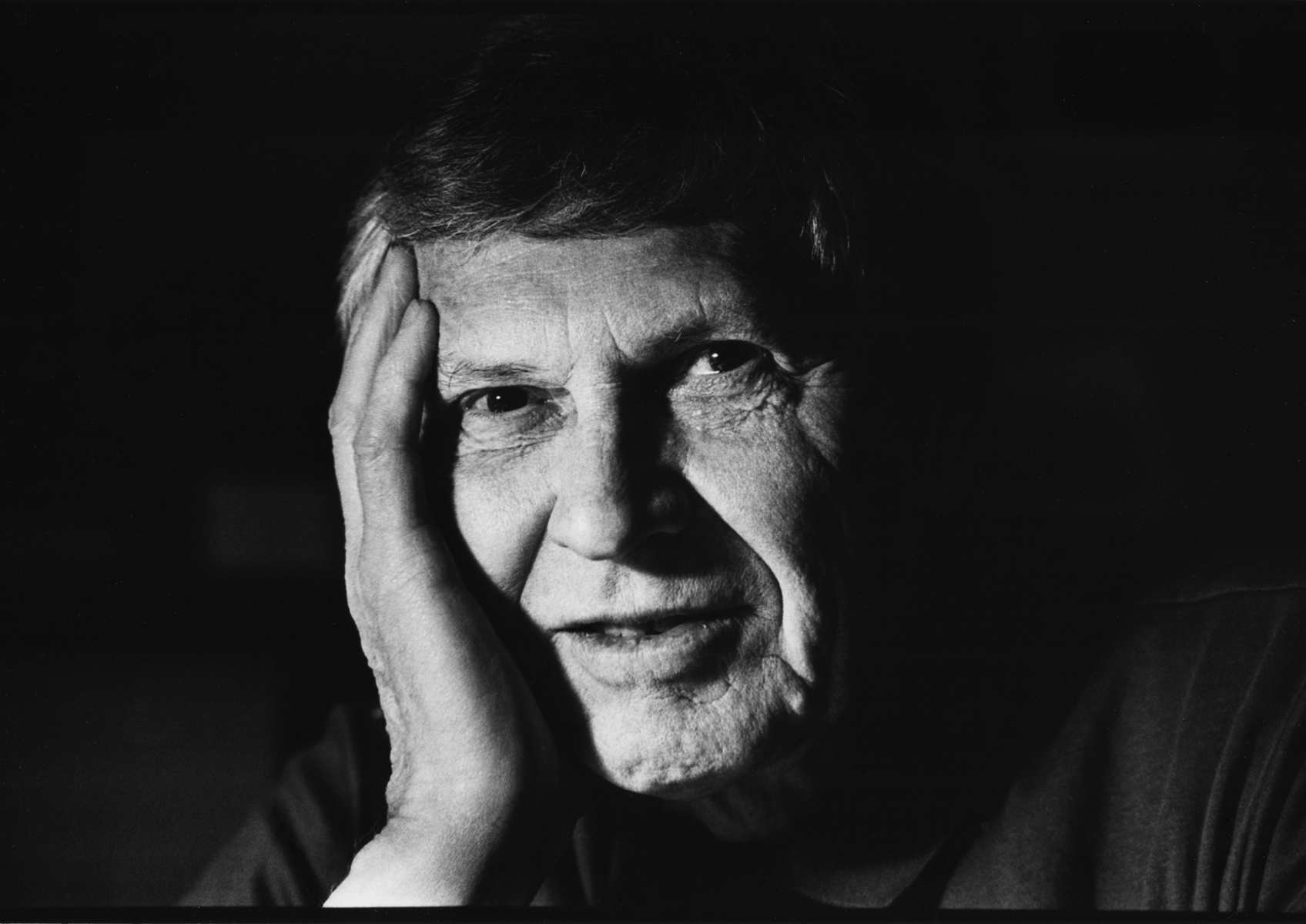
- Stokoe in 1993
- Born: July 21, 1919; Lancaster, New Hampshire, U.S.
- Died: April 4, 2000 (aged 80); Chevy Chase, Maryland, U.S.
- Education: Cornell University (BA, PhD)
- Known for: Redefining language, establishing American Sign Language as a unique language, Stokoe notation
- Spouse: Ruth Stokoe
- Scientific career
- Fields: English; American Sign Language
- Workplaces: Wells College; Gallaudet University
- Thesis: The Work of the Redactors of Sir Launfal, Richard Coeur de Lion, and Sir Degaré

William Clarence “Bill” Stokoe Jr. (/ˈstoʊkiː/ STOH-kee; July 21, 1919 – April 4, 2000) was an American linguist and a long-time professor at Gallaudet University. His research on American Sign Language (ASL) revolutionized the understanding of ASL in the United States and sign languages throughout the world. Stokoe's work led to a widespread recognition that sign languages are true languages, exhibiting syntax and morphology, and are not only systems of gesture.

== Early life and education ==
William C. Stokoe Jr. was born July 21, 1919, in Lancaster, New Hampshire. Stokoe graduated from Cornell University in 1941, from which he earned his Ph.D. in English in 1946, specializing in medieval literature. From there, he became an instructor of English at Wells College.

== Career ==
From 1955 to 1970, he served as a professor and chairman of the English department at Gallaudet University, after being recruited to the position by his friend and former classmate Dean George Detmold. He published Sign Language Structure (1960) and co-authored along with Dorothy C. Casterline and Carl G. Croneberg, A Dictionary of American Sign Language on Linguistic Principles (1965). The former was the first place the term "American sign language" was ever formally used. (The fully capitalized version: "American Sign Language," first appeared in the Buff and Blue in October 1963.) He also started the academic journal Sign Language Studies in 1972, which he edited until 1996. He established Linstok Press, an academic publishing company, to facilitate the journal's publication. Stokoe's final book, Language in Hand, was published in 2001, after his death.

Though the relationship between Stokoe and Gallaudet was not always one of complete support (Gallaudet closed his Linguistics Research Laboratory, wherein he carried out the studies that would lead him to declare ASL a fully formed and legitimate language, in 1984, after he retired), the university awarded him an honorary doctorate in 1988.

== Sign language research ==
Stokoe researched American Sign Language (ASL) extensively while he worked at Gallaudet University. He coined the term cherology, the equivalent of phonology for sign language. However, sign language linguists, of which he was the first, now generally use the term "phonology" for signed languages.

=== Notation system ===
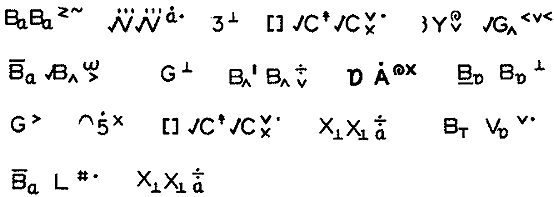
A passage from Goldilocks in ASL transcribed in Stokoe notation.

Stokoe invented a written notation for sign language (now called Stokoe notation) as ASL had no written form at the time. Unlike SignWriting, which was developed later, it is not pictographic, but drew heavily on the Latin alphabet.

Thus the written form of the sign for 'mother' looks like

͜ 5^{x}

The ' ͜ ' indicates that it is signed at the chin, the '5' indicates that it uses a spread hand (the '5' of ASL), and the 'x' indicates that the thumb touches the chin. Stokoe coined the terms tab, dez, and sig, meaning sign location, handshape and motion, to indicate different categories of phonemes in ASL. The Stokoe notation system has been used for other sign languages, but is mostly restricted to linguists and academics (as yet, no notation system for a sign language has gained significant use).

== Legacy ==
Through the publication of his work, he was instrumental in changing the perception of ASL from that of a broken or simplified version of English to that of a complex and thriving natural language in its own right with an independent syntax and grammar as functional and powerful as any found in the oral languages of the world. Gil Eastman, a Deaf actor and playwright, recommended that Stokoe be called the "Father of Sign Language linguistics."
