= Orientation (sign language) =

Aspect of signs in sing languages

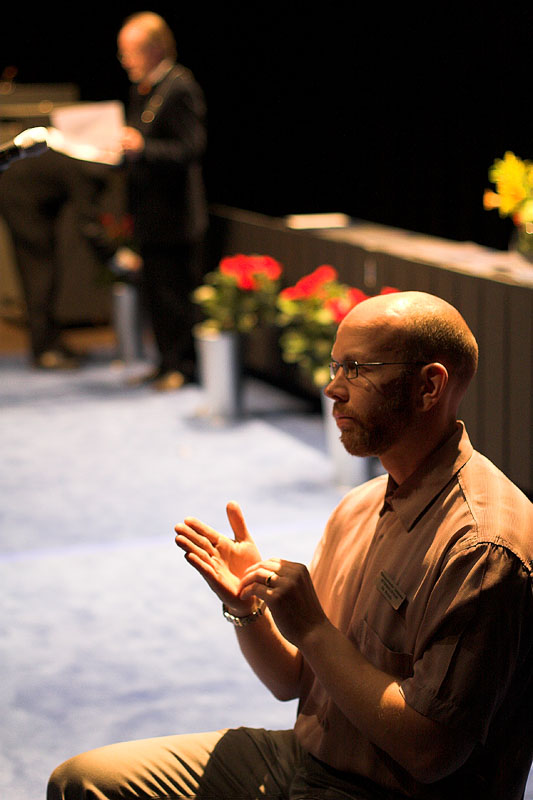
A sign language interpreter at a presentation. The hands are facing each other in orientation: one is palm-up, the other palm-down.

In sign languages, orientation (ORI) is the distinctive relative degree of rotation of the hand when signing. Orientation is one of five components of a sign, along with handshape (DEZ), location (TAB), movement (SIG), and nonmanual features.

== See also ==
- American Sign Language grammar
