= Movement (sign language) =

Aspect of signs in sign languages

In sign languages, movement, or sig, refers to the distinctive hand actions that form words. In William Stokoe's terminology, it is the SIG, an abbreviation of signation. Movement is one of five components of a sign—with handshape (DEZ), orientation (ORI), location (TAB), and nonmanual features. Different sign languages use different types of movement. Some treatments distinguish movement and hold—signs, or parts of signs, that involve motion vs. those that hold the hands still.

== Movements in American Sign Language ==
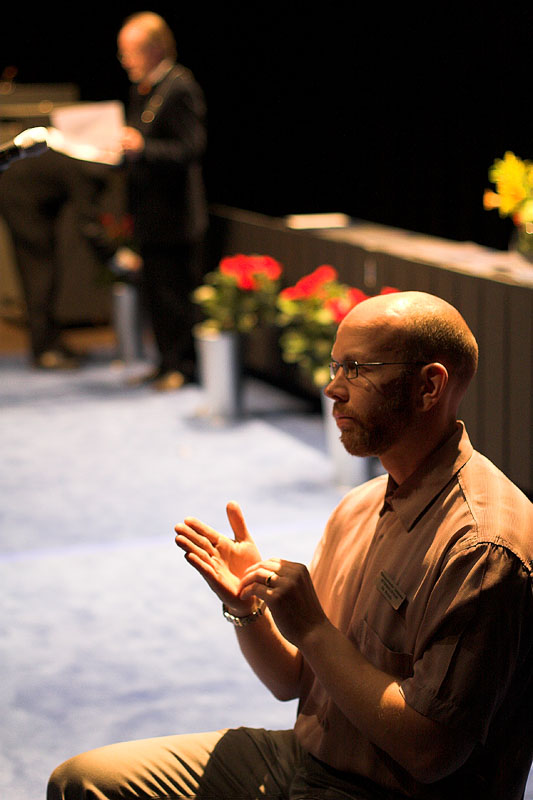
A sign language interpreter at a presentation. The active, tapered hand has just touched the passive, flat hand.

American Sign Language uses about twenty movements. These include lateral motion in the various directions, twisting the wrist (supinating or pronating the hand), flexing the wrist, opening or closing the hand from or into various handshapes, circling, wriggling the fingers, approaching a location, touching, crossing, or stroking it, and linking, separating, or interchanging the hands. These may be repeated and made large or small and with varying degrees of speed, abruptness, and intensity.
