= Location (sign language) =

Term in sign language

In sign languages, location, or tab, refers to specific places that the hands occupy as they are used to form signs. In Stokoe terminology it is known as the TAB, an abbreviation of tabula. Location is one of five components, or parameters, of a sign, along with handshape (DEZ), orientation (ORI), movement (SIG), and nonmanual features. A particular specification of a location, such as the chest or the temple of the head, can be considered a phoneme. Different sign languages can make use of different locations. In other words, different sign languages can have different inventories of location phonemes.

== Locations in American Sign Language ==
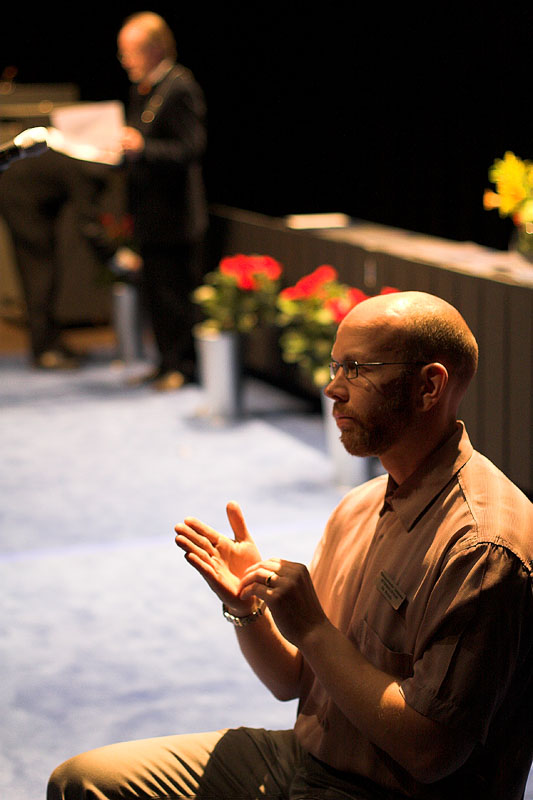
A sign language interpreter at a presentation. The location is the non-dominant hand.

American Sign Language uses 12 locations excluding the hands themselves: the whole face/head; the forehead or brow; the eyes or nose; the mouth or chin; the temple, cheek or ear (side of the head); the neck; the trunk (shoulders to waist); the upper arm; the elbow or forearm, the back of the wrist, and the inside of the wrist. In addition, in asymmetric two-handed signs, the dominant hand makes contact with the non-dominant hand, which then serves as the location of the sign. A sign may also be articulated in neutral space, which is considered a default location in some models of sign language phonology.
