= Handshape =

Aspect of sign languages

In sign languages, handshape, or dez, refers to the distinctive configurations that the hands take as they are used to form words. In Stokoe terminology it is known as the dez, an abbreviation of designator. Handshape is one of five components of a sign, along with location (tab), orientation (ori), movement (sig), and nonmanual features. Different sign languages make use of different handshapes.

== Constraints ==
Possible handshapes are constrained by a variety of mechanic and neural factors. Evolutionary forces have led to some handshapes being easier or more natural for humans to produce than others. These tendencies can be summarized as follows:

1. The selected (extended) finger is either the thumb or the index finger
2. Neighboring fingers are coupled
3. All fingers have the same shape

A 2022 study of handshapes found that 85.6% of handshapes in 33 sign languages conform to these biological tendencies. Additionally, 35 handshapes were found to be represented in 89.2% of the 33 languages examined. Handshapes that did not conform to these tendencies were common in fingerspelling. This may be due to fingerspelling being a result of culture and explicit learning rather than arising naturally.

== In American Sign Language ==
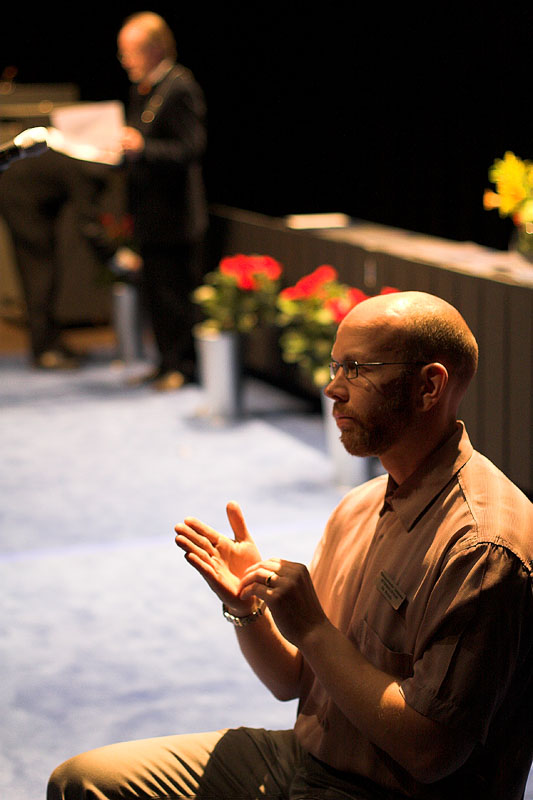
A sign language interpreter at a presentation. The two handshapes are the flat (B) hand and the tapered (O or M) hand.

American Sign Language uses 18 handshapes for ordinary signs, plus a few marginal handshapes taken from the American Manual Alphabet for fingerspelling.

Not all handshapes occur with every orientation, movement, or location: there are restrictions. For example, the 5 and F handshapes (the approximate shapes of the hand in fingerspelling 5 and F) only make contact with another part of the body through the tip of the thumb, whereas the K and 8 (a.k.a. Y) handshapes only make contact through the tip of the middle finger, and the X handshape only with the flexed joint of the index finger.

== See also ==
- Classifier handshape
