= Witchcraft Destroys Minds & Reaps Souls =

Studio album by Coven
- Released: June 15, 1969
- Recorded: February 1969
- Genre: Occult rock; psychedelic rock; progressive rock; hard rock; proto-metal
- Length: 45:55
- Label: Mercury
- Producer: Bill Traut

Coven chronology
Witchcraft Destroys Minds & Reaps Souls (1969)	Coven (1972)

Professional ratings
Review scores
Source	Rating
AllMusic	2/5 stars

Witchcraft Destroys Minds & Reaps Souls (also known simply as Witchcraft) is the first album by the American rock band Coven. The album's overtly occult and satanic themes prompted removal from the market soon after its release in 1969. That summer coincided with public hysteria surrounding the Manson family and rampant media speculation about occult influences on the era's counterculture. The album's lyrical themes and visual design were influential on the occult rock and heavy metal genres.

== Background ==
One of the songwriters, James Vincent, appears with the name "Jim Donlinger" on the album. Born James Vincent Dondelinger, he was not a member of the band (prior to this he was in the band Aorta), but was asked by Bill Traut, Coven's producer (and founder of Dunwich Records, whose logo also appears on the album), to write, arrange and co-produce the album together with Traut. Vincent describes the event in negative terms, as a "bizarre album project":

"Bill brought me a large box full of books about witchcraft and related subjects. He told me to read them and start writing some songs ... Sometime before the sun came up, I had completely written all the material requested of me for the entire album ... Coven also contributed four songs to the project."

== Reception and influence ==
At the time of its brief initial release, the album was panned by contemporary music critics and publications. Retrospectively, the album is regarded by some to be a classic of its genre, and in some ways set groundbreaking trends for later rock bands. The album marked the first appearance in music of the sign of the horns, inverted crosses, and the phrase "Hail Satan". Today, these are characteristics of the heavy metal genres. According to rock journalist Lester Bangs, "in England lie unskilled laborers like Black Sabbath, which was hyped as a rockin' ritual celebration of the Satanic mass, something like England's answer to Coven". As a further coincidence, Coven's bass guitarist and co-writer (Michael Gregory Osborne) is credited as "Oz Osborne", and the opening track is "Black Sabbath".

Nirvana would play the album while driving between shows of their 1990 tour.

== Track listing ==
No.	Title	Writer(s)	Length
1.	"Black Sabbath"	Donlinger	3:32
2.	"White Witch of Rose Hall"	Donlinger	3:08
3.	"Coven in Charing Cross"	Donlinger	4:04
4.	"For Unlawful Carnal Knowledge"	Dawson, Ross, Wilkerson, Osborne	4:41
5.	"Pact with Lucifer"	Donlinger, G. Donlinger, Wilkerson	3:32
6.	"Choke, Thirst, Die"	Donlinger	3:32
7.	"Wicked Woman"	Dawson, Ross, Wilkerson, Osborne	3:01
8.	"Dignitaries of Hell"	Donlinger	4:09
9.	"Portrait"	Dawson, Ross, Osborne	2:37
10.	"Satanic Mass"	Traut	13:19
Total length:			45:55

== Personnel ==
- Jinx Dawson – lead vocals
- Jim Donlinger – guitar, vocals
- Jim Nyeholt – organ, piano, keyboards
- Alan Estes, Oz Osborne – bass
- Steve Ross – drums, percussion

== Production ==
- Produced by Bill Traut
- Engineered by Mal Davis
