= The Omen (2006 soundtrack) =

2006 soundtrack by Marco Beltrami

The Omen (Original Motion Picture Soundtrack)

Film score by Marco Beltrami
- Released: June 6, 2006
- Recorded: 2006
- Studio: Abbey Road, London
- Genre: Film score
- Length: 43:30
- Label: Varèse Sarabande; Fox Music
- Producer: Marco Beltrami

Marco Beltrami chronology
Underworld: Evolution (2006)	The Omen (Original Motion Picture Soundtrack) (2006)	The Invisible (2007)

The Omen (Original Motion Picture Soundtrack) is the soundtrack to the 2006 film The Omen, a remake of the 1976 film of the same name directed by John Moore. The film score was composed by Marco Beltrami, who reuses themes from the original film's score composed by Jerry Goldsmith. A score album featuring 20 tracks was released through Varèse Sarabande and Fox Music labels on June 6, 2006, the same day as the film's release.

== Development ==
Beltrami, who was tutored under composer Jerry Goldsmith during his career at USC Thornton School of Music in Los Angeles. He wanted to approach the same way Goldsmith did with his score for The Omen, but in a more modern way highlighting the score's evolution. Goldsmith's liking to the use of electronics and manipulating timbre sounds was purely coincidental on the way Beltrami approached it.

The track "Omen 76/06" is based on Goldsmith's "Ave Satani" where the prominent sounds—the pedal of a piano being depressed and released with the incorporation of strings to provide a "breathy quality"—had led Beltrami to combine it with a processed voice of Latin sounds. Despite not being extensively throughout the film, he used the choral portions with the lyrics "Ave Satani" when Julia Stiles' character sees her son to be missing from the park, which was not exactly the way Goldsmith used in the score. Beltrami further reused Goldsmith's compositions from the original film and incorporated into his score.

The score was recorded at the Abbey Road Studios in London. Moore assisted him in several instances when Beltrami was writing the score and allowed him to take creative freedom.

== Critical reception ==
Christian Clemmensen of Filmtracks wrote "By attempting to re-invent the sound of the franchise and only skirt the edges of Goldsmith's classic, he was destined to dismay listeners and diminish his own impact on the film." Jonathan Broxton in his review for Movie Music UK wrote "Rather than rolling over in his grave, the old master will likely be applauding the young pretender." Jason Ankeny of AllMusic wrote "What undermines this incarnation of The Omen is its over-reliance on contemporary elements and effects—its woodwind motifs, rumbling bass, and choral passages are interchangeable with any number of latter-day horror scores."

Brian Lowry of Variety wrote "while Marco Beltrami has delivered an evocative score, a snippet of the late Jerry Goldsmith's masterpiece "Ave Satani" over the closing credits stirs a hunger for more." Stephen Holden of The New York Times called it as "spine-chilling". Brian McVickar of Soundtrack.Net wrote "One could argue that an update of The Omen was not really required but regardless it has resulted in an enjoyable, engaging effort from Beltrami and a highlight for 2006." Peter T. Chattaway of Patheos wrote "Composer Marco Beltrami does not just emulate the style of Jerry Goldsmith's Oscar-winning score for the original movie, he even re-uses some of its themes."

== Track listing ==
The Omen (Original Motion Picture Soundtrack) track listing
No.	Title	Length
1.	"The Omen Main Titles"	2:58
2.	"The Adoption"	4:12
3.	"Ambassador Gets Fired"	1:33
4.	"New House / Damien's Deliverance"	2:20
5.	"The Nanny's Noose"	2:05
6.	"A Cross to Bear"	2:49
7.	"Ms. Baylock"	1:50
8.	"Damien's Tantrum"	1:52
9.	"More Tantrums"	1:05
10.	"Kate Doubts"	1:05
11.	"Scooter"	2:44
12.	"Don't Let Him Kill Me"	1:29
13.	"On the Hills of Spiletto"	6:58
14.	"Dogs in the Cemetery"	2:02
15.	"Drive to Bugenhagen"	1:31
16.	"Dirty Deeds"	4:12
17.	"Altar of Sacrifice"	4:10
18.	"The Funeral"	1:41
19.	"Boy Genius"	2:52
20.	"Omen 76 / 06"	3:30
Total length:		43:30

== Personnel ==
- Music composer and producer – Marco Beltrami
- Orchestra – The Hollywood Studio Symphony
- Choir – Metro Voices
- Orchestration – Bill Boston, Dana Niu, Marcus Trumpp, Pete Anthony
- Conductor – Pete Anthony
- Contractor – Isobel Griffiths
- Pro-tools session editor – Kevin Globerman
- Sound design – Buck Sanders
- Recording and mixing – John Kurlander
- Recordist – Richard Lancaster
- Mastering – Erick Labson
- Music editor – Alex Gibson
- Music supervisor – Mike Knobloch
- Music coordinator – Rebecca Morellato
- Copyist – Dave Hage
- Executive producer – Robert Townson
