= Reverse crucifix =

A reverse crucifix may refer to:

- A professional wrestling hold
- The Cross of St. Peter
