= ILY sign =

American Sign Language gesture

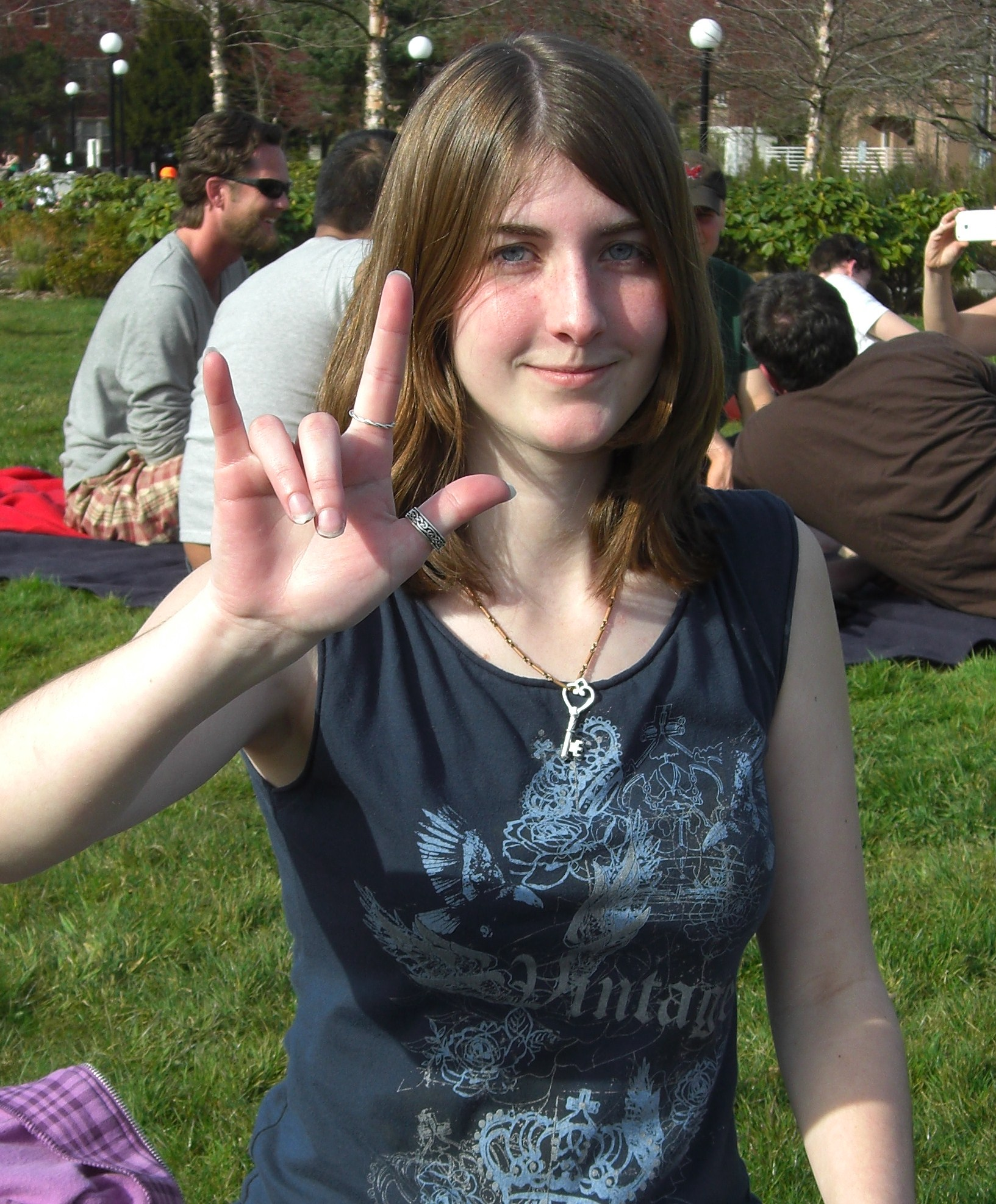
The ILY is a common sign in ASL deaf culture meaning, "I Love You" (informal).

The ILY is a sign from American Sign Language which, as a gesture, has moved into the mainstream. Seen primarily in the United States and other Americanized countries, the sign originated among deaf schoolchildren using American Sign Language to create a sign from a combination of the signs for the letters I, L, and Y (for "I love you").

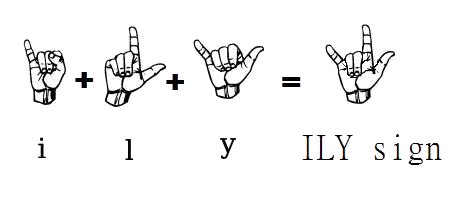
production

SignWriting transcription

ASLwrite transcription

The sign is an informal expression of any of several positive feelings, ranging from general esteem to love, for the recipient of the sign. A similar-looking but unrelated variation in which the thumb is toward the palm appears in heavy metal music culture as a "horns" hand-sign (though the thumbs extended version is sometimes used) and in college football as a sign of support for various teams including the University of Texas. The University of Louisiana at Lafayette's Ragin' Cajuns Athletics uses the ILY sign to symbolize the initials of the university (UL).

== History ==
Deaf Heritage dates the origin of the ILY to 1905. The sign received significant media exposure with Richard Dawson's use of the ILY in his sign off from each episode of the Family Feud, which he hosted from 1976 to 1985. Presidential candidate Jimmy Carter reportedly picked it up from a group of deaf supporters in the Midwest and, in 1977, during his Inauguration Day parade, flashed the ILY to a group of deaf people on the sidewalk.

The character U+1F91F 🤟 I LOVE YOU HAND SIGN was added to the Unicode standard in version 11.0, released June 2018.

External videos
- Appeal to add ILY and other signs to Unicode, YouTube video

This followed a campaign to have several common signs added to the Unicode Character Set.

== In popular culture ==
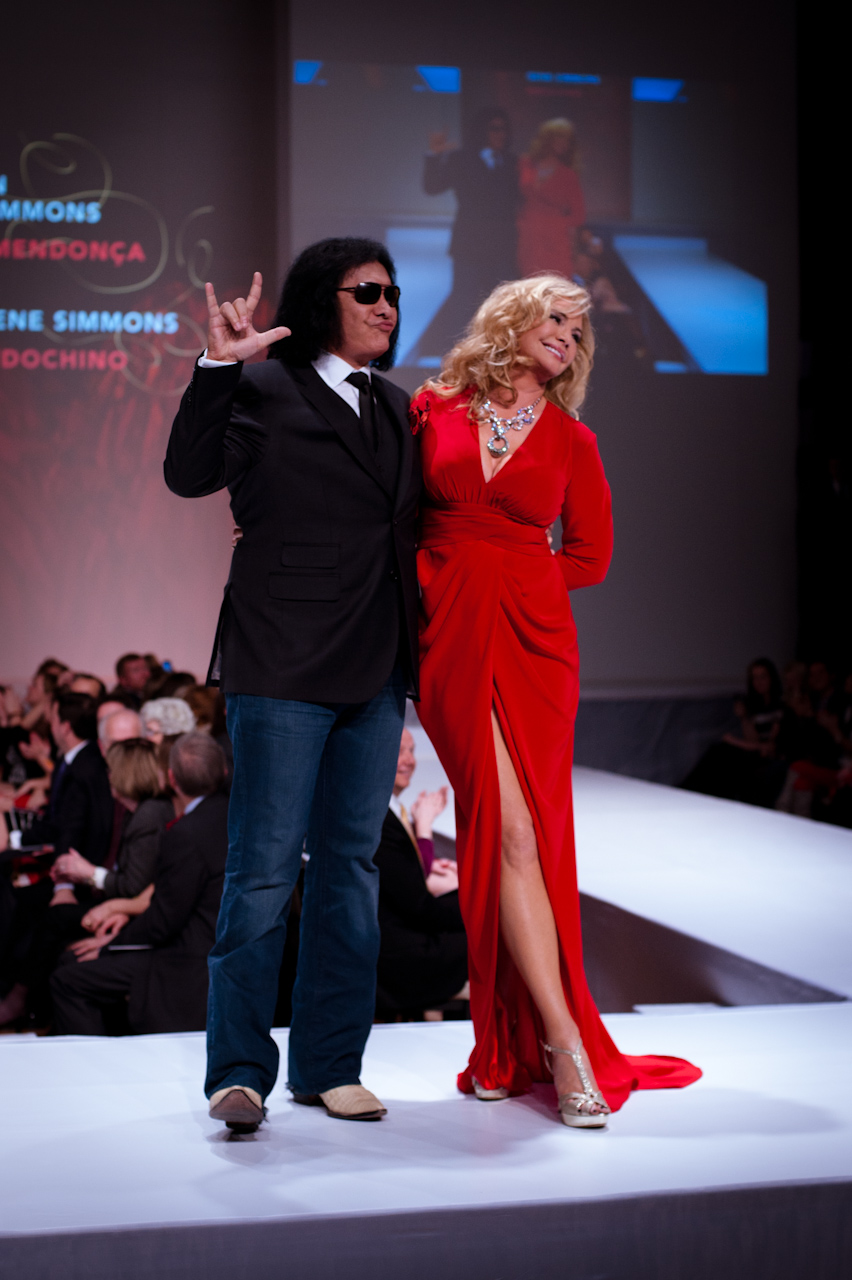
Gene Simmons showing the ILY sign at a fashion show, 2012

Popular 80s professional wrestler Jimmy Snuka would frequently flash the ILY sign with both hands during his matches and interviews, including while standing on the top rope before delivering his finishing move "Superfly Splash".

Gene Simmons of the rock band Kiss has used the symbol in photoshoots, concerts and public appearances since 1974. He has stated in a television interviews that he was a Marvel comics fan, and was inspired by the Doctor Strange use of the symbol to use it himself in photoshoots. He later (by 1976 or earlier) had black gloves made that lacked index and pinky fingers so that even his raised open hand would emulate the ILY sign.

The ending pose of the popular K-pop song "Boy with Luv" by BTS also incorporates this sign with all the members turning around and raising their right hands in this sign.

Throughout the K-pop song "Fancy", the members of the girl group Twice do this gesture when dancing.

The ILY sign is also a part of the choreography for the song "CASE 143" by Stray Kids (with "143" as a code for "I love you"). It's the title song of their EP MAXIDENT in which they are referencing love as a "maximum accident".

In 2025, Venezuelan footballer Reyes Barrios was arrested by ICE and deported to the Salvadoran Terrorism Confinement Center (CECOT) after DHS declared him to be a member of the gang Tren de Aragua. In filings, it came out that this classification was due to him having made the ILY sign in a social media post (which they declare to be a gang sign), as well as having a Real Madrid tattoo.
