= Hail Satan =

Exclamation used by some Satanists

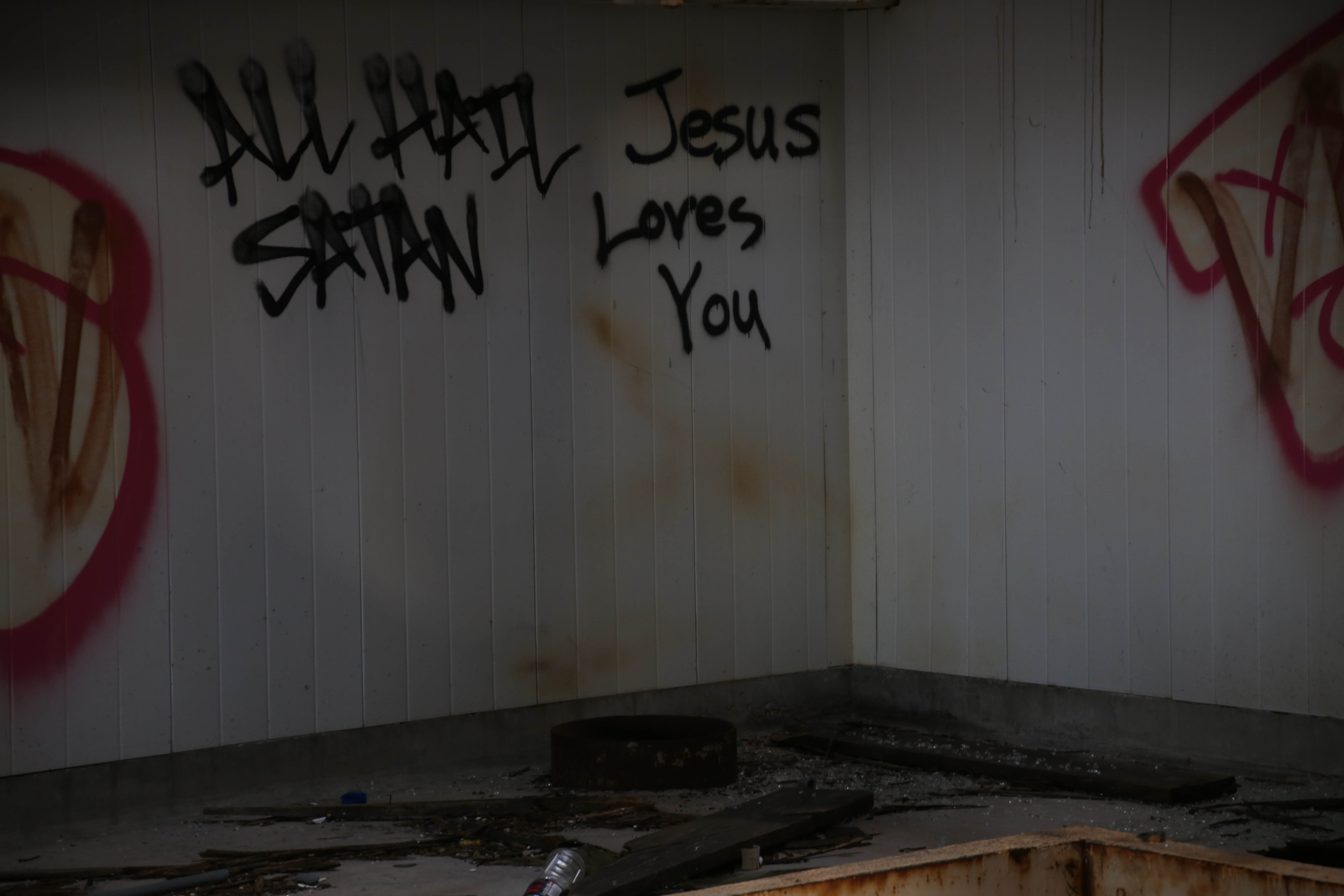
Graffiti that says All Hail Satan

"Hail Satan", sometimes Latinized as "Ave Satanas", is an exclamation used by some Satanists to invoke the name of Satan in contexts ranging from sincere expression to comedy or satire. The Satanic Temple uses the phrase as a sincere expression of rational inquiry removed from supernaturalism and archaic tradition-based superstitions.

== Cultural history ==
The phrase "Hail Satan" is documented as early as 1808, where it is said in the poem The Monk of Cambray by an evil monk who uses his pact with Satan to advance in the ranks of the Catholic Church (and finally become Pope).

The Latin version Ave Satanas (in its variant spelling Ave Sathanas), often appears in literature at least from the 1800s, notably in the popular 1895 faustian novel The Sorrows of Satan, and earlier in an 1862 play St. Clement's Eve (in reference to satanic undertakings supposed to take place at midnight in a district of Paris). After the phrase "Hail Satan" appeared in the 1967 book Rosemary's Baby by Ira Levin and the 1968 film adaptation of it, where it is said by Satanists when they believe Satan's will has been accomplished, and had also appeared in other films and in stock footage, the phrase became part of the common conception of what Satanists say. Some film actors were reluctant to say it, and of those who did said they felt they experienced negative life events afterwards, such as divorce.

Coinciding with its appearance in Rosemary's Baby, the phrase became a common greeting and ritual term in the Church of Satan (founded in 1966), both in its English form, Hail Satan, as well as in the Latin version of it, Ave Satanas. When Ave Satanas was used, it was often preceded by the term Rege Satanas ("Reign, Satan"). (Rege Satanas can be heard in the video of a widely publicized Church of Satan wedding performed by LaVey on February 1, 1967.) The combination "Rege Satanas, Ave Satanas, Hail Satan!" is found as a greeting in early Church of Satan correspondence, as well as in their 1968 recording The Satanic Mass, and ultimately in their 1969 book The Satanic Bible. The same combination also appeared in 1969 in the non-Church of Satan record album by the rock band Coven, in a 13 minute long "Satanic Mass" of their own. The use of "Hail Satan" by Coven (as well as their use of the sign of the horns and inverted crosses on the same album) was the first time this phrase was used in rock music. The phrase is used in some versions of the Black Mass, where it often accompanies the phrase "shemhamforash" (from a Hebrew phrase meaning "the explicit name") and is said at the end of each prayer. This rite was performed by the Church of Satan appearing in the documentary Satanis in 1969. Some occultists accompany it with similar addresses to other gods or figures they revere. Rituals involving the phrase tend to be more likely to be mentioned in the press at Halloween.

"Ave Satani", the theme song for The Omen (1976), written by Jerry Goldsmith, which won him an Academy Award, has a title which is intended to mean "Hail Satan" in Latin, in opposition to "Ave Christi". (The song contains other Latin phrases inverting Christ, such as "Ave Versus Christi", meaning "Hail Anti-Christ", and "Corpus Satani", an inversion of "Corpus Christi", the body of Christ). The song has been described as hair-raising and has inspired cover versions such as those by Fantômas or Gregorian. The music is used in comic portrayals of stock "sinister" characters; for instance in the South Park episode "Woodland Critter Christmas", which involves devil-worshiping woodland creatures, a version of the "Ave Satani" is heard in the background when the animals use their demonic powers.

In 1985, the phrase received national news coverage in the United States when serial killer Richard Ramirez, known as the "Night Stalker", shouted "Hail Satan!" as he was led from the courtroom, while raising his hand with a pentagram drawn onto it. Members of Ramirez's family denied that he said the phrase, believing that he said "We'll see," but "Hail Satan" was still being used by journalists over twenty years later as being characteristic of Ramirez. In reviewing whether Ramirez was deprived of his due process and right to a fair trial by being restrained by leg shackles, the Supreme Court of California itself highlighted Ramirez's use of "Hail Satan" to support its conclusion that the trial court did not abuse its discretion in ordering Ramirez to be physically restrained during trial.

The phrase may be used ironically by heavy metal fans as part of their rebellious ethos. Heavy metal musicians may use it as part of their act or their songs, such as Hail Satanas We Are the Black Legions by Mütiilation. Heavy metal musicians, for instance Ozzy Osbourne, a member of the Church of England, rarely consider themselves to be Satanists, instead using it as part of their stage persona, a role they play. RuPaul's Drag Race Season 4 Winner Sharon Needles has a song called "Hail Satan", in which she cites icons from the satanic culture. John Darnielle, discussing the closing refrain of "Hail Satan" in the Mountain Goats song "The Best Ever Death Metal Band in Denton," asserted that "if you believe in Satan, then you believe in God." In an episode of the podcast I Only Listen to the Mountain Goats, Darnielle described recording this line: "The Hail Satan wasn’t written down; it was a spontaneous eruption [during recording], but it felt like a religious confession. Not obviously the dark principal that people talk about… the Satan, John Milton’s Satan. That’s not what that means. It means a celebration of two people being true to themselves. It’s a celebration of that later satanic principal of self knowledge which isn’t really satanic at all, it’s actually God-like."

The ubiquity of the phrase has led to it being used in parodic imitation of evangelism, as with the Mr. Show with Bob and David sketch "Hail Satan Network" which includes characters who are Satanic televangelists. It received another humorous use when The Simpsons character Bart Simpson was punished for using it to end the Pledge of Allegiance in the episode "Burns' Heir" (1994).

"Ave Satanas" is chanted in episode 5 of American Horror Story: Cult and more prominently throughout American Horror Story: Delicate.

== Reputation ==
Believers in backmasking think they can hear "Hail Satan" and other similar messages in some songs played in reverse, such as "Walk This Way" by Aerosmith. Some of those who believe in backmasking, along with some Christian fundamentalists, believe messages such as "Hail Satan" may subliminally inspire people to do evil, a view which may have received some reinforcement when the phrase was used as part of the vandalizing of churches, but its use then might have been the expression of a general anti-religious sentiment, as suggested by its use along with slogans such as "Think, don't Pray". Vandalism accompanying it may include the anarchy symbol or other slogans intended to shock, such as racial slurs. It can accompany symbols such as a swastika, inverted pentagram, or inverted cross. Such vandalism is usually by rebellious young people rather than Satanists, whose activities are not often criminal.

Rick Alan Ross, an anti-cultist and deprogrammer, referred to the murder trial of Scott Peterson, in which the defense made the claim that the killings were by a "Satanic cult" rather than the defendant. Ross called this a ridiculous manifestation of the Satanic panic, referred to it as a "Hail Satan Pass", similar to the Hail Mary pass in football, a desperate and unlikely attempt.
