= Cross of Saint Peter =

Religious symbol

A Cross of Saint Peter is an inverted Latin cross.

The Cross of Saint Peter, also known as the Petrine Cross, is an inverted cross traditionally used as a Christian symbol, associated with the martyrdom of Saint Peter. The symbol originates from the Catholic tradition that when sentenced to death, Peter requested that his cross be upside down, as he felt unworthy to die in the same manner Jesus had.

== History ==
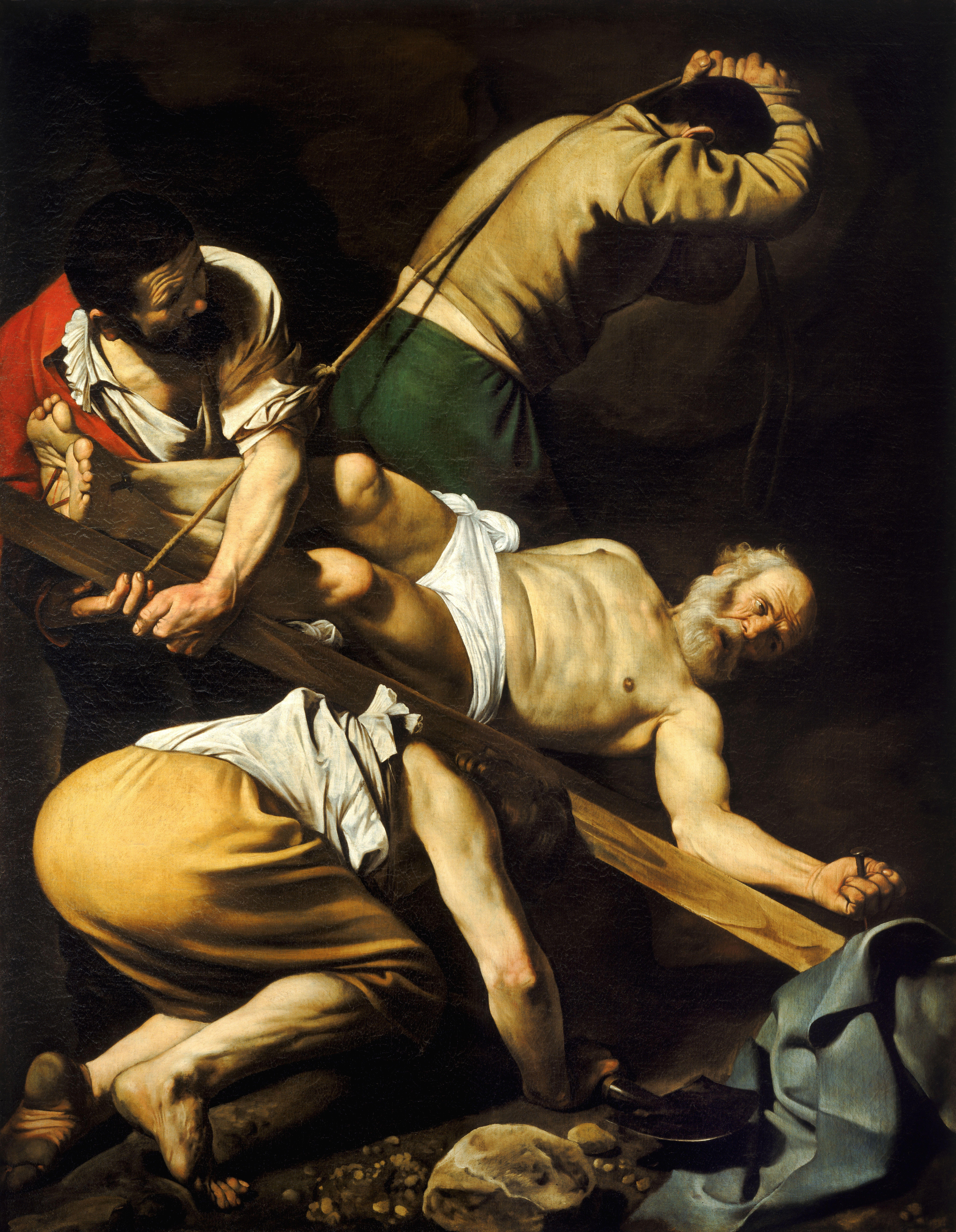
Crucifixion of Saint Peter on an upside down cross by Caravaggio (c. 1600)

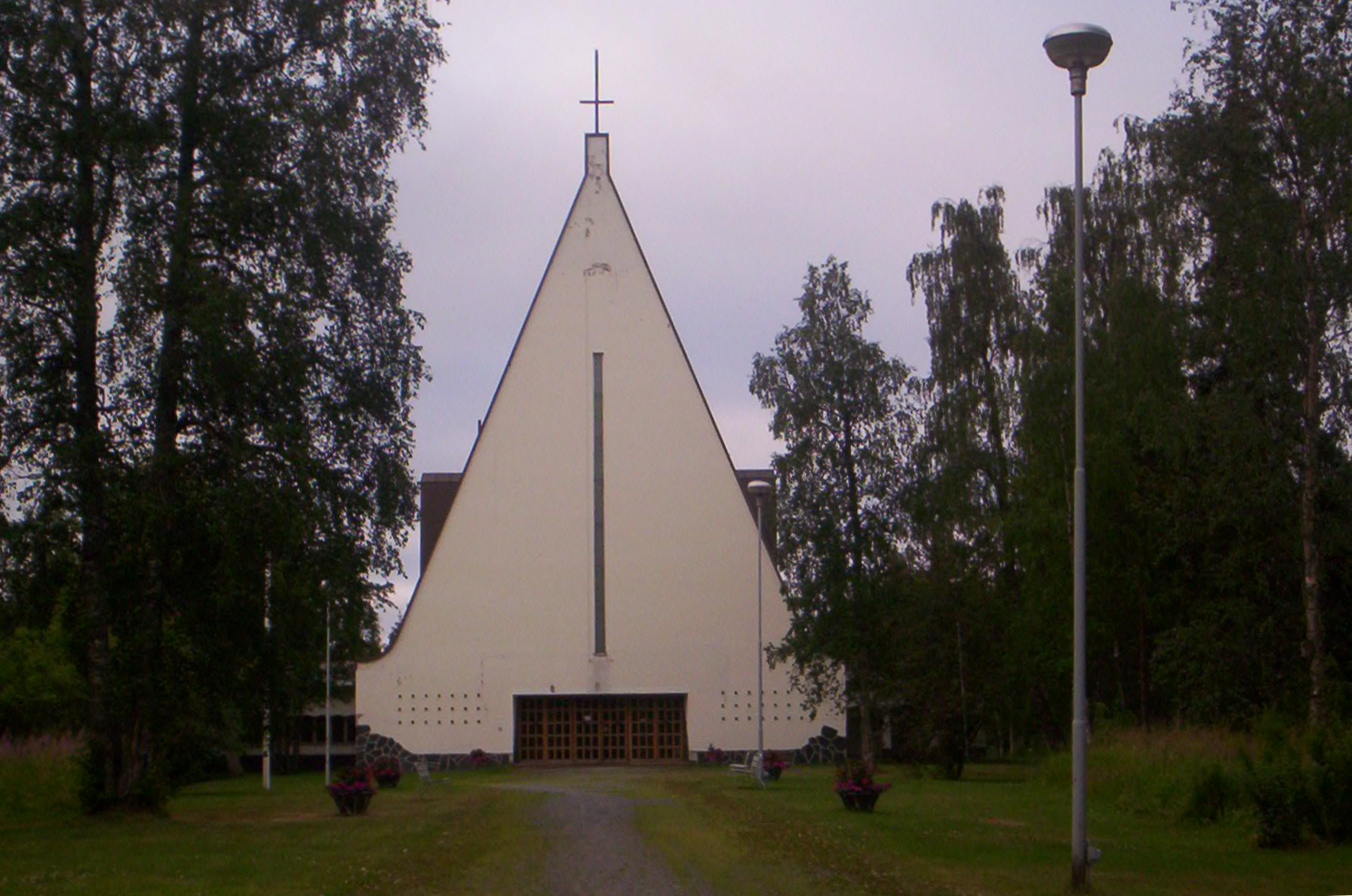
Peter's Cross on Veitsiluoto church, a Lutheran church in Kemi, Finland

The origin of the symbol comes from the tradition that Saint Peter was crucified upside down. This narrative first appears in the Martyrdom of Peter, a text found in, but possibly predating, the Acts of Peter, an apocryphal work which was originally composed during the second half of the 2nd century. In the Acts of Peter, the author writes that Peter's request to be crucified upside-down was to make a point: That the values of those crucifying him were upside down, and that one needs to look beyond the inverted values of this world and adopt the values of Jesus if they wish to enter the Kingdom of heaven.

Sometime in the middle of the 3rd century, Origen of Alexandria popularized the tradition that Peter requested to be crucified upside-down. At the end of the 4th century, Jerome wrote in his De Viris Illustribus ("On Illustrious Men") that the reason for this request was that Peter felt he was unworthy to die in the same manner as Jesus.

The 19th-century French mystic Eugène Vintras (1807–1875), founder of the Work of Mercy movement, led a mystical Christian sect sometimes referred to as neo-Catholic. His teachings emphasized Marian visions, apocalyptic prophecy, and Eucharistic miracles, positioning his movement within a heterodox Christian framework. According to scholar Ruben van Luijk, Vintras incorporated the Petrine Cross into his vestments, particularly on his stole, as part of his movement's esoteric Christian symbolism. He was accused of heresy by the Catholic Church and the movement was formally condemned by Pope Gregory XVI in 1851. Joris-Karl Huysmans' novel Là-bas (1891), which describes a Black Mass where participants wear vestments with inverted crosses, fictionalized Vintras' use of the inverted cross in an anti-Christian context.

== Use in heraldry ==
The Cross of Saint Peter appears in ecclesiastical heraldry as a reference to the apostle’s martyrdom. According to Saints, Signs, and Symbols by Hilarie and James Cornwell, Saint Peter's coat of arms features an inverted cross with crossed keys, symbolizing both his crucifixion upside down and his role as the keeper of the keys to the Kingdom of Heaven (Matthew 16:19). This composition is prominently used in heraldic designs associated with Saint Peter and the Papacy, where it represents papal authority and apostolic succession.

== See also ==
- Christian cross variants
- Cross of Lorraine
- Saint Andrew's Cross
