= Coven (band) =

American rock band

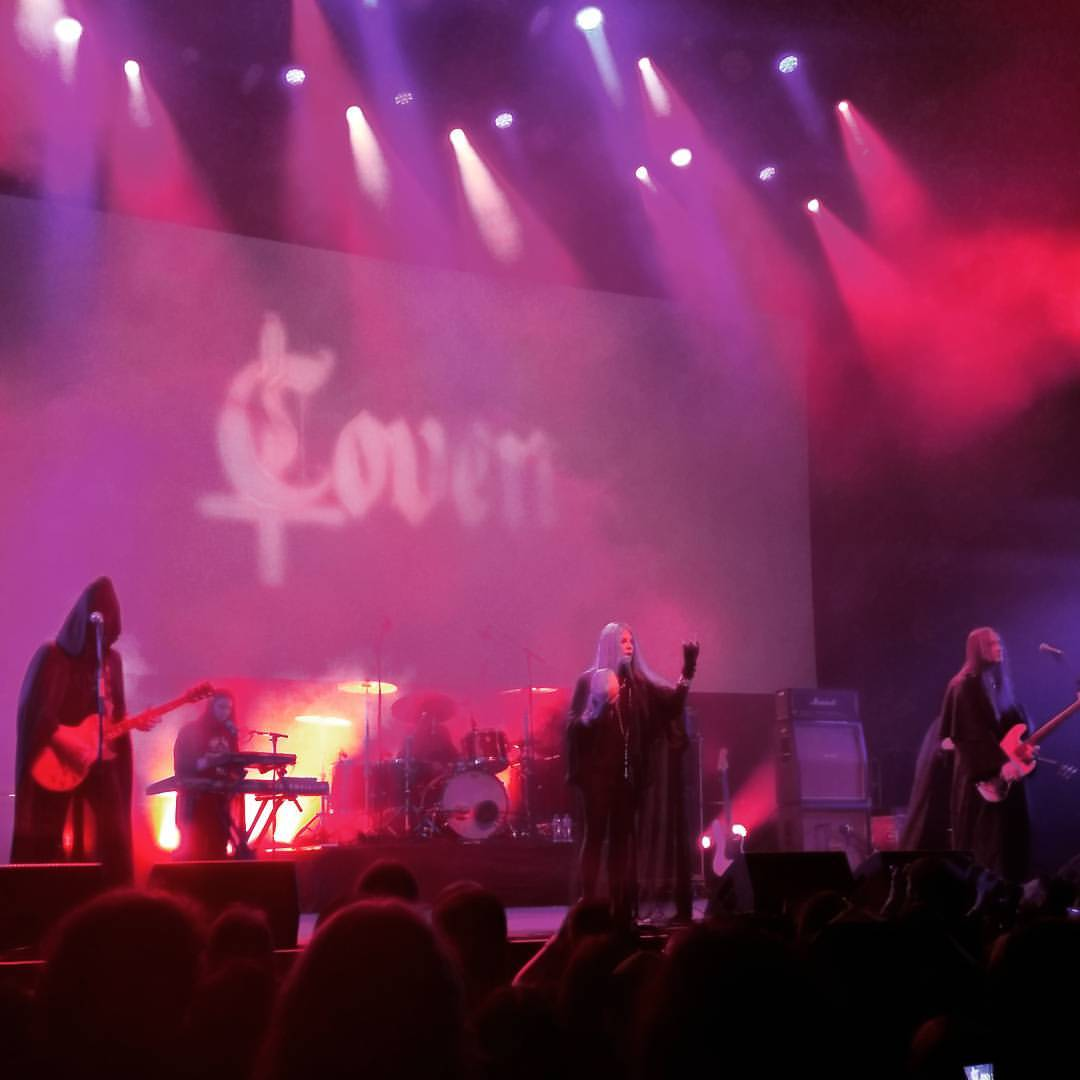
- Coven performing at Roadburn Festival 2017

Background information
- Origin: Chicago, Illinois, U.S.
- Genres: Psychedelic rock; acid rock; occult rock; proto-metal
- Years active: 1967–1975, 2007–present
- Labels: Mercury, Warner Bros., MGM, Buddah, Nevoc
- Members: Jinx Dawson; Alex Kercheval; Chris Vaughn; Colin Oakley; Zayne Hutchison
- Past members: Oz Osborne (not to be confused with Ozzy Osbourne); Steve Ross; Rick Durrett; John Hobbs; Chris Neilsen; David Wilkerson; Wade Parish; Christopher Thurmond; Chris Wild

Coven is an American rock band formed in Chicago in the late 1960s. They had a top 40 hit in 1971 with the song "One Tin Soldier", the theme song of the movie Billy Jack, and are widely credited as pioneers of occult rock.

Coven was originally composed of vocalist Jinx Dawson, bassist Greg "Oz" Osborne, guitarist Chris Neilsen, keyboardist Rick Durrett (later replaced by John Hobbs), and drummer Steve Ross. In addition to pioneering occult rock with lyrics and aesthetics that explicitly deal in themes of Satanism and witchcraft, they are recognized by metal fans and metal historians as being the band that introduced the "sign of the horns" to rock, metal and pop culture, as seen on their 1969 debut album release Witchcraft Destroys Minds & Reaps Souls.

== History ==
Jinx Dawson and Oz Osborne played together in the Indianapolis group Him, Her and Them, and formed Coven with Ross in Chicago around or before 1967. In 1967 and 1968 they toured alongside Jimmy Page's Yardbirds, the Alice Cooper Band, and Vanilla Fudge. Coven signed with Mercury Records and released their debut album, Witchcraft Destroys Minds & Reaps Souls, in 1969.

The music on the album was considered underground rock; what made it distinctive was the heavy emphasis on diabolical subject matter, including songs such as "The White Witch of Rose Hall" (based on the story of Annie Palmer), "For Unlawful Carnal Knowledge", "Black Sabbath" and "Dignitaries of Hell". The album concluded with a 13-minute track of chanting and Satanic prayers called "Satanic Mass" (written by their producer, Bill Traut, of Dunwich Productions, and described as "the first Black Mass to be recorded, either in written words or in audio"). This Satanic Mass was also the first time Latin phrases such as "Ave Satanas" were used in occult rock music, a preceding influence to later Satanic metal and black metal songs that include such lyrics. Also included inside the album was Coven's infamous Black Mass poster, showing members of the group displaying the sign of the horns as they prepared for a Satanic ritual over a nude Dawson lying on an altar.

Unwanted publicity came to the band in the form of a sensationalistic Esquire magazine issue entitled "Evil Lurks in California" (Esquire, March 1970), which linked counterculture interest in the occult to Charles Manson and the Tate-La Bianca murders, while also mentioning the Witchcraft Destroys Minds & Reaps Souls album and its Black Mass material. As a result, the album was pulled from circulation.

MGM signed Coven in 1971. Dawson recorded the vocals for "One Tin Soldier", the title theme for the 1971 film Billy Jack, which was credited as "sung by Coven". The song, which went on to reach number 26 on the Billboard Hot 100, was written by Dennis Lambert and Brian Potter and was originally released by the Original Caste in 1969. Coven's version also reached the top 10 in Cash Box and was named the Number 1 Most Requested Song in 1971 and 1973 by American Radio Broadcasters. It also peaked at number 45 in Australia. In October 1971, the whole band, together, performed and released the song, under MGM. In 1972, the band released a self-titled album that included "One Tin Soldier". Their third album, Blood on the Snow, was produced by Shel Talmy and released by Buddah Records in 1974. A music video for the title track was produced and released by Walt Disney Studios.

After multiple unlicensed CD releases of the Witchcraft album over the years, it was officially released on the band's own Nevoc label in 2007. The following year, Coven released Metal Goth Queen: Out of the Vault 1976–2007 on Nevoc, an album composed of previously unreleased recordings. Jinx, an album of new recordings, was self-released on Nevoc in 2013. Jinx Dawson recruited a new line up of musicians in late 2016 – early 2017 in order to perform at Roadburn Festival in the Netherlands on April 20, 2017. This was Coven's first performance in Europe.

== Influence ==
The heavy metal subculture debates the extent that the British metal band, Black Sabbath, was inspired by Coven:

- Coven employed the sign of the horns in a musical context, shortly after which Black Sabbath bassist Geezer Butler used the same sign, and it would eventually be popularized in the heavy metal scene when Butler suggested Ronnie James Dio employ the sign.
- In addition to featuring the first documented use of the sign of the horns gesture on a rock album cover, the gatefold artwork of Coven's debut album, Witchcraft Destroys Minds & Reaps Souls, released on June 15, 1969, marked the first documented use of an inverted cross in rock music history. This occult imagery directly preceded Black Sabbath's self-titled debut album, released on February 13, 1970, where the record label Vertigo printed a large inverted cross inside the opened gatefold section of the sleeve.
- Lester Bangs of Rolling Stone described Black Sabbath's debut album as a "blend between Cream and Coven," further calling them "the English response to Coven."
- The confusion between Black Sabbath lead singer Ozzy Osbourne and Coven bass player Oz Osbourne, resulting in accusations of plagiarism and intellectual identity theft.

Sabbath guitarist Tony Iommi has denied any influence from Coven, claiming that the former only learned of the latter after the release of their debut self-titled album in 1970. King Diamond, a metal band contemporary to Black Sabbath, assert that the former denied any influence to avoid being linked to the Tate-LaBianca murders perpetrated by the Manson Family. Media reporting on the murders overlapped with the first two years of Black Sabbath's development and the release of their first three albums (Black Sabbath, Paranoid, and Master of Reality).

== Discography ==
Studio albums

- Witchcraft Destroys Minds & Reaps Souls (1969, Mercury)
- Coven (1972)
- Blood on the Snow (1974)
- Metal Goth Queen: Out of the Vault 1976-2007 (2008)
- Jinx (2013)

Box sets

- Half A Century Of Witchcraft (2021, Prophecy)

Five album set includes the first three Coven albums along with Rarities and Esoterica
