= The Omen (1976 soundtrack) =

Soundtrack album by Jerry Goldsmith
- Released: 1976
- Genre: Film music
- Length: 34:16
- Label: RCA Victor
- Producer: Jerry Goldsmith

Jerry Goldsmith chronology
Logan's Run (1976)	The Omen (1976)	High Velocity (1976)

The Omen (Original Motion Picture Soundtrack) is the score soundtrack for the 1976 film of the same name directed by Richard Donner. The film's original score is composed by Jerry Goldsmith which consisted of choral elements predominantly used throughout with the film with foreboding Latin chants. The score was criticially acclaimed for which Goldsmith won his only Academy Award for Best Original Score in his career.

== Development ==
The Omen features an original score composed by Jerry Goldsmith. Although the film was produced on a tight budget, Alan Ladd Jr. provided Goldsmith a remuneration of $25,000 to compose the music for the film. Producer Harvey Bernhard provided him the script as per Donner's suggestion, but Goldsmith did not have a particular idea. According to Goldsmith's wife, Carol, the composer initially struggled with ideas for the score until one evening when he suddenly, happily announced to her, "I hear voices", referring to an orchestral chorus or choir. While discussing it to Bernhard, he immediately responded to his ideas which served as the basis for the score. The resulting score features a strong choral segment, with a foreboding Latin chant; a departure from his usual composing style. Arthur Morton assisted him in arranging the choral portions and orchestrated the score with the National Philharmonic Orchestra conducted by Lionel Newman.

"I would have to say Jerry Goldsmith kicked it up 50 percent with that score. I thought it was brilliant, and everybody fell over it"

— David Seltzer

In addition to the score, Goldsmith penned and composed the original song "Ave Satani" which served as the film's theme song. He wanted to create a kind of Satanic version of a Gregorian chant and came up with ideas with from Morton, something like a Black Mass, inverting Latin phrases from the Latin Mass. The choirmaster, who was an expert in Latin, helped him come up with phrases that inverted Christ and the Mass. The song in its entirety had lyrics that are an inversion of the Roman Catholic rite of the consecration and elevation of the body and blood of Christ during the Mass. Carol also penned and performed an original song "The Piper Dreams".

== Reception ==
Christian Clemmensen of Filmtracks.com wrote "The Omen is a necessary inclusion in any Goldsmith collection, but a highly disturbing one at that." James Southall of Movie Wave wrote "No serious fan of film music could be without this score, a masterpiece from beginning to end." Craig Lysy of Movie Music UK wrote "This is a Goldsmith masterpiece, a masterwork of film score art, and what I believe to be an essential part of your collection." Luke Bunting of Set the Tape wrote "While writing a dark choral piece hailing Satan may seem like a logical direction for any horror score about the Anti-Christ, Goldsmith’s approach was a revelation at the time." Anthony Tognazzini of AllMusic wrote "Goldsmith's gripping musical depiction of darkness and evil is a big part of what made The Omen a critical and commercial success."

Todd McCarthy, in his review for The Hollywood Reporter, called Goldsmith's score "a major one and [it] represents an indispensable contribution to the impact of the film." Jacob Dunstan of Collider wrote "The film's score, composed by Jerry Goldsmith, is an essential element in creating a chilling and eerie atmosphere, elevating even the most innocuous scenes into nightmares." Laura Bradley of The Daily Beast wrote "Like many horror films, The Omen would be nothing without its music, which immediately establishes a tense, at times demonic atmosphere."

== Accolades ==
Prior to The Omen, Goldsmith has received eight nominations for Academy Award for Best Original Score since 1963, but did not win any. He initially wanted to boycott the 49th Academy Awards, though Bernard and Mace Neufeld persuaded him to attend the ceremony convincing him that this would be the nomination he would finally win. At that night of the ceremony, Goldsmith had smoked three cigarettes being nervous of the result. But he would eventually receive the award, and also being nominated for Best Original Song for the theme song "Ave Satani". He would also receive a nomination for Best Album of Original Score at the 19th Annual Grammy Awards.

== Track listing ==
=== Original soundtrack ===
An original soundtrack to the film was released in LP records on 1976 under the RCA Victor label. It was again issued in CDs by Varèse Sarabande and released on October 1, 1990. The album consisted only 10 cues from Goldsmith's score and two songs: "Ave Satani" and "The Piper Dreams" performed by Jerry and Carol, respectively.

All music is composed by Jerry Goldsmith.

The Omen: Original Motion Picture Soundtrack track listing
No.	Title	Lyrics	Artist	Length
1.	"Ave Satani"	Jerry Goldsmith	Jerry Goldsmith	2:32
2.	"The New Ambassador"		Jerry Goldsmith	2:33
3.	"The Killer Storm"		Jerry Goldsmith	2:51
4.	"A Sad Message"		Jerry Goldsmith	1:42
5.	"The Demise of Mrs. Baylock"		Jerry Goldsmith	2:52
6.	"Don't Let Him"		Jerry Goldsmith	2:48
7.	"The Piper Dreams"	Carol Goldsmith	Carol Goldsmith	2:39
8.	"The Fall"		Jerry Goldsmith	3:42
9.	"Safari Park"		Jerry Goldsmith	2:04
10.	"The Dogs Attack"		Jerry Goldsmith	5:50
11.	"The Homecoming"		Jerry Goldsmith	2:43
12.	"The Altar"		Jerry Goldsmith	2:00

=== Deluxe edition ===
For the film's 25th anniversary, a deluxe edition soundtrack that features eight additional tracks was released by Varèse Sarabande on October 9, 2001. A vinyl edition of the soundtrack was published by Mondo which released it on October 31, 2014.

All music is composed by Jerry Goldsmith.

The Omen: Deluxe Edition Soundtrack track listing
No.	Title	Lyrics	Artist	Length
1.	"Ave Satani"	Jerry Goldsmith	Jerry Goldsmith	2:35
2.	"On This Night"		Jerry Goldsmith	2:36
3.	"The New Ambassador"		Jerry Goldsmith	2:34
4.	"Where Is He?"		Jerry Goldsmith	0:56
5.	"I Was There"		Jerry Goldsmith	2:27
6.	"Broken Vows"		Jerry Goldsmith	2:12
7.	"Safari Park"		Jerry Goldsmith	3:24
8.	"A Doctor, Please"		Jerry Goldsmith	1:44
9.	"The Killer Storm"		Jerry Goldsmith	2:54
10.	"The Fall"		Jerry Goldsmith	3:45
11.	"Don't Let Him"		Jerry Goldsmith	2:49
12.	"The Day He Died"		Jerry Goldsmith	2:14
13.	"The Dogs Attack"		Jerry Goldsmith	5:54
14.	"A Sad Message"		Jerry Goldsmith	1:44
15.	"Beheaded"		Jerry Goldsmith	1:49
16.	"The Bed"		Jerry Goldsmith	1:08
17.	"666"		Jerry Goldsmith	0:44
18.	"The Demise of Mrs. Baylock"		Jerry Goldsmith	2:54
19.	"The Altar"		Jerry Goldsmith	2:07
20.	"The Piper Dreams"	Carol Goldsmith	Carol Goldsmith	2:41

=== 40th Anniversary edition ===
A limited-edition soundtrack was released on October 21, 2016, for the film's 40th anniversary with six additional tracks and a bonus track.

All music is composed by Jerry Goldsmith.

The Omen: 40th Anniversary Edition Soundtrack track listing
No.	Title	Lyrics	Artist	Length
1.	"Ave Satani"	Jerry Goldsmith	Jerry Goldsmith	2:34
2.	"On This Night"		Jerry Goldsmith	2:35
3.	"The New Ambassador"		Jerry Goldsmith	2:35
4.	"Where Is He?"		Jerry Goldsmith	0:55
5.	"Fatal Fall/It's All For You"		Jerry Goldsmith	0:42
6.	"The Dog"		Jerry Goldsmith	0:24
7.	"I Was There"		Jerry Goldsmith	2:24
8.	"Have No Fear"		Jerry Goldsmith	0:36
9.	"Broken Vows"		Jerry Goldsmith	2:12
10.	"Safari Park"		Jerry Goldsmith	3:21
11.	"A Doctor, Please"		Jerry Goldsmith	1:43
12.	"She'll Die"		Jerry Goldsmith	1:43
13.	"The Killer Storm"		Jerry Goldsmith	2:55
14.	"The Fall"		Jerry Goldsmith	3:45
15.	"Don't Let Him"		Jerry Goldsmith	2:48
16.	"The Day He Died"		Jerry Goldsmith	2:14
17.	"Father Spiletto"		Jerry Goldsmith	1:09
18.	"The Dogs Attack"		Jerry Goldsmith	5:53
19.	"Mother's Death"		Jerry Goldsmith	0:48
20.	"A Sad Message"		Jerry Goldsmith	1:44
21.	"Beheaded"		Jerry Goldsmith	1:48
22.	"The Bed"		Jerry Goldsmith	1:08
23.	"666"		Jerry Goldsmith	0:46
24.	"The Demise of Mrs. Baylock"		Jerry Goldsmith	2:54
25.	"The Altar"		Jerry Goldsmith	2:04
26.	"The Piper Dreams"	Carol Goldsmith	Carol Goldsmith	2:39
27.	"The Omen Suite"		Diego Navarro, Tenerife Film Orchestra	10:52
