= Ave Satani =

Theme song from the 1976 film The Omen

Single by Jerry Goldsmith

from the album The Omen: Original Motion Picture Soundtrack
- B-side: "The Killer Storm"
- Released: 2001
- Recorded: 1976
- Genre: Film soundtrack, Choral
- Length: 2:32
- Label: Cinefantastique/Varèse Sarabande
- Songwriter: Jerry Goldsmith

"Ave Satani" is the theme song to the 1976 film The Omen, which is composed by Jerry Goldsmith. The Omen won the Academy Award for Best Original Score, with Ave Satani nominated for Best Original Song. The song is written in Latin and contains a number of grammatical errors.

== History ==
The Latinized title translates to "Hail Satan" in English. In an interview, Goldsmith says that his idea was to create a kind of Satanic version of a Gregorian chant and came up with ideas while talking with the London choir-master of the orchestra who was helping him. He decided to create something like a Black Mass, inverting Latin phrases from the Latin Mass. The choir-master, according to Goldsmith, was an expert in Latin and helped him come up with phrases; instead of saying "Hail Mary", they decided on "Hail Satan", and so on. The song contains various Latin phrases inverting Christ and the Mass, such as "Ave Versus Christi", meaning "Hail Anti-Christ", and "Corpus Satani", an inversion of "Corpus Christi", the body of Christ. The resulting lyrics are an inversion of the Roman Catholic rite of the consecration and elevation of the body and blood of Christ during the Mass.

A version of the song has been produced by the band Fantômas, who altered some of the lyrics to mean "smallest blood, body spirit" rather than "we drink the blood, we eat the flesh," and added the word "rotted". Other versions of the original song have been performed by the Italian vocalist Servio Tulio, and by Gregorian. The song has been used in mixes of sinister music including the album Oculus Infernum by Van Helsing's Curse, featuring Dee Snider.

== Lyrics ==
The choir master's Latin contains a number of errors. Below are the Latin phrases which are repeated throughout the music, with their intended meaning, and a more correct Latin version:

Latin (as in the soundtrack)	Correct Latin	English translation
sanguis bibimus	sanguinem bibimus	We drink the blood
corpus edimus	corpus edimus	We eat the body
tolle corpus Satani	tolle corpus Satanae	Raise the body of Satan
ave, ave Versus Christus!	avē, avē Antichriste!	Hail, Hail Antichrist!
ave Satani!	avē Satana!	Hail Satan!

== See also ==
- The Omen
- Satanism
- Black Mass
- Ave Satanas
