= ASLwrite =

Transcription system for American Sign Language

ASLwrite

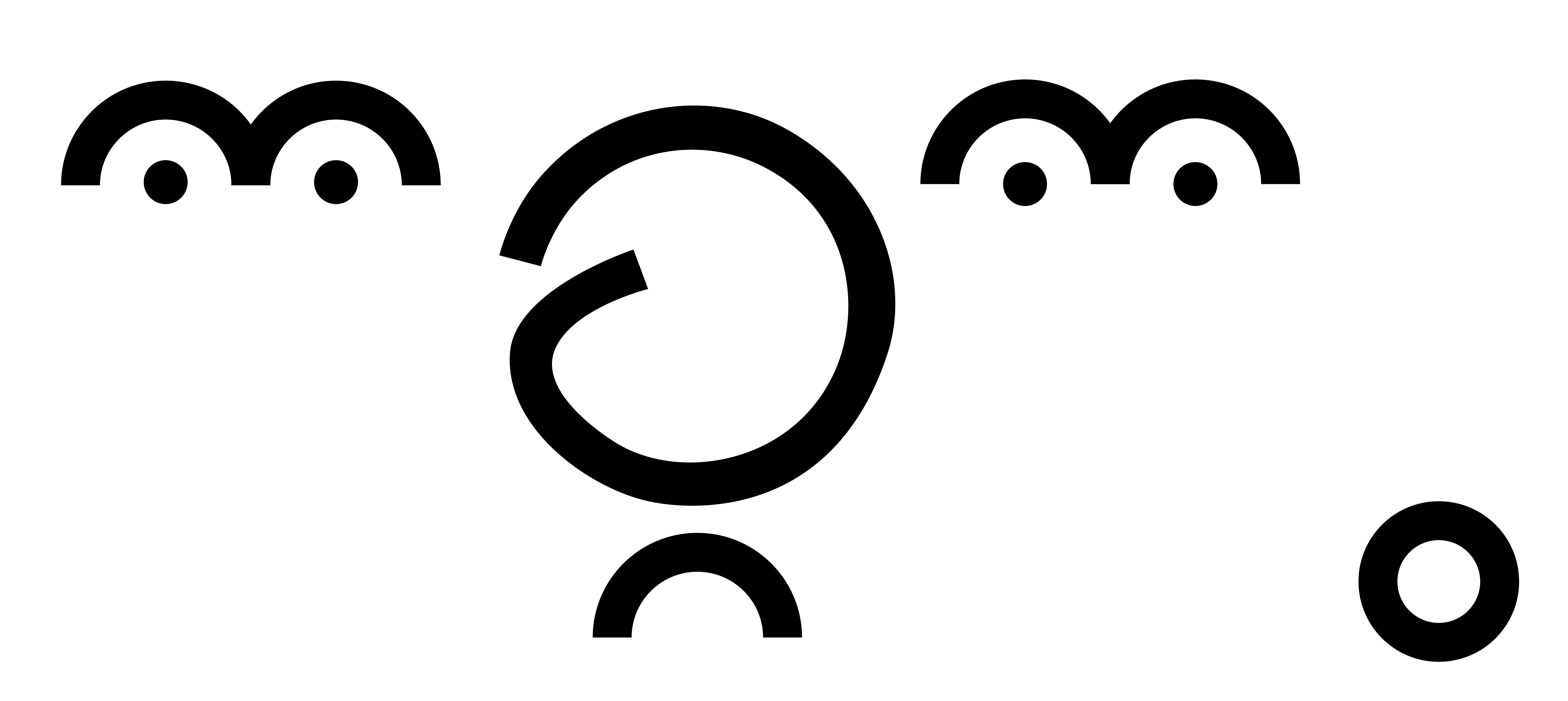
- "Yes?" in ASL
- Script type: Alternative (Iconic featural)
- Creator: Adrean Clark, Julia Dameron
- Created: 2011
- Languages: American Sign Language

Related scripts
- Parent systems: SignWriting: si5s; ASLwrite

Unicode
- Unicode range: Not in Unicode
- Very few ASL speakers use this writing system. ASLwrite's Website

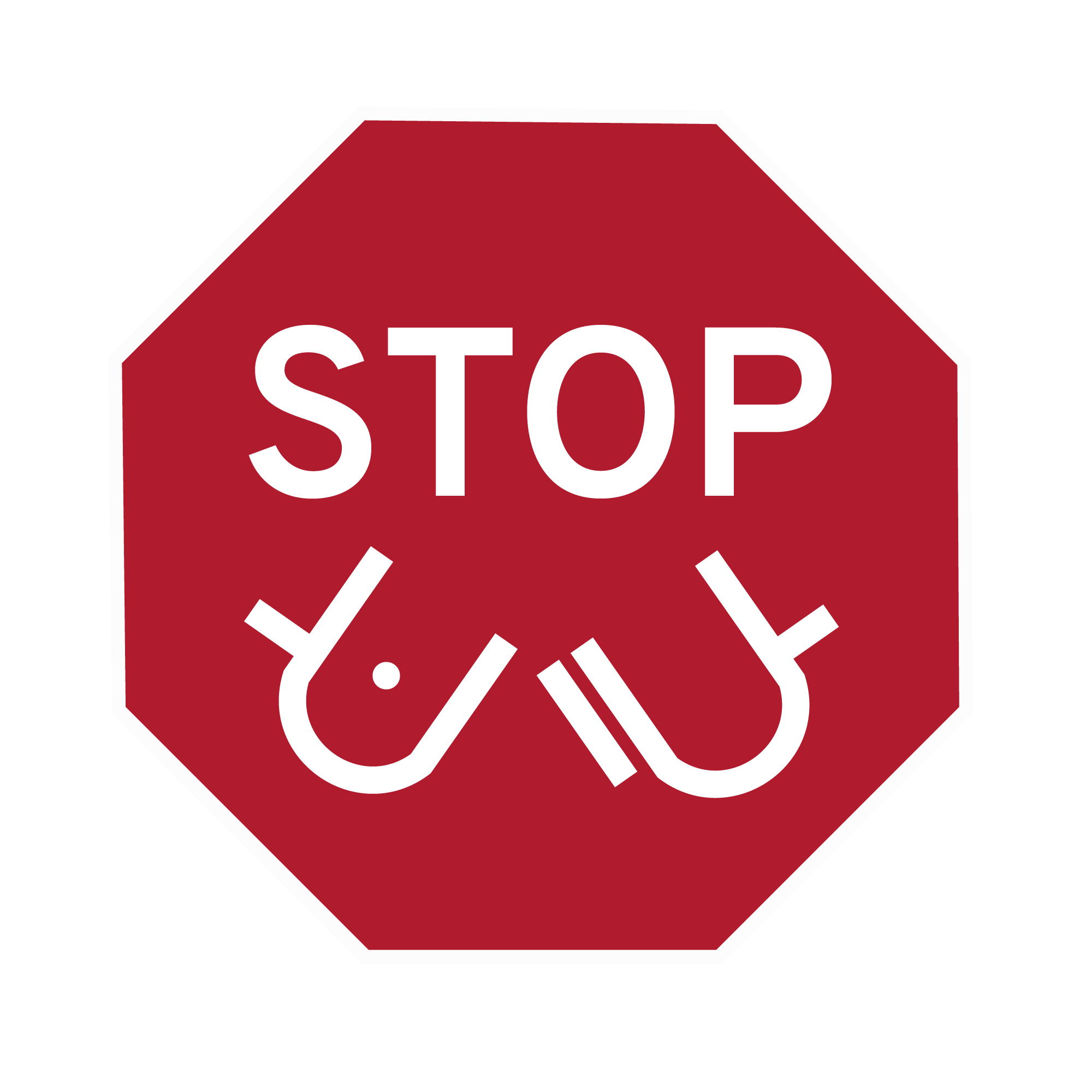
Stop sign mock-up in English (top) and ASL (bottom)

ASLwrite (ASL: ) is a writing system that developed from si5s. It was created to be an open-source, continuously developing orthography for American Sign Language (ASL), trying to capture the nuances of ASL's features. ASLwrite is only used by a handful of people, primarily revolving around discussions happening on Facebook and, previously, Google Groups. ASLwrite has been used for comic strips and posters.

Its core components are digits, locatives, marks and movements which are written in a fairly rigid order (though in a fairly flexible configuration) from left to right. Its digits are representations of handshapes – or the configuration of the hand and fingers – where the locatives represent locations on the body (or, in theory, in space), the marks represent anything from location (e.g., edge mark) to small movements (e.g., flutter) to facial expressions (e.g., raised eyebrow mark) and the movements indicate the movement of the hands in space by modifying the digits (and for shoulder shift /head nod modifying the body).

The order of the writing is from left to right, top to bottom, with locatives or certain marks often beginning words. Sentences are ended by the full stop mark. Questions in written ASL are denoted by eyebrow marks bounding the question not unlike Spanish's "¿ ?." Question words or wh-questions in ASL can also form the interrogative.

There are in total 105 characters in ASLwrite with 67 digits, five diacritic marks, twelve locatives, sixteen extramanual marks and five movement marks.

Since its creation, it has evolved to include more digits, locatives, movements and marks as well as modify those already present.

== History ==
si5s, a system built from SignWriting, was first proposed by Robert Arnold in his 2007 Gallaudet thesis A Proposal of the Written System for ASL. The ASLwrite community split from Arnold upon his decision to maintain si5s as a private venture with ASLized after the publication of his and Adrean Clark's book How to Write American Sign Language. Today, ASLwrite's website notes:

The ASLwrite community is committed to keeping written ASL freely available in the public domain by providing resources for writers of all ages. We believe that written ASL will be changed through regular usage by ASL speakers, and support individual adaptation of the language by the signing community. This website serves as a continuing record of written ASL’s development.

— ASLwrite, About

== Use ==
Aside from the small, but dedicated, Facebook group of around 470 in July 2023, ASLwrite is rarely used outside such online spaces. However, one of the most popular online ASL dictionaries, HandSpeak, has begun to incorporate ASLwrite as the primary written component of ASL definitions.

== Type of system ==
ASLwrite is a somacheirographic system meaning that it represents the body (Greek: σῶμα sôma 'body') and hands (Greek: χείρ kheír 'hand') and relays phonemic information. However, it also incorporates logographs (questioning marks) and is featural.

== Description ==
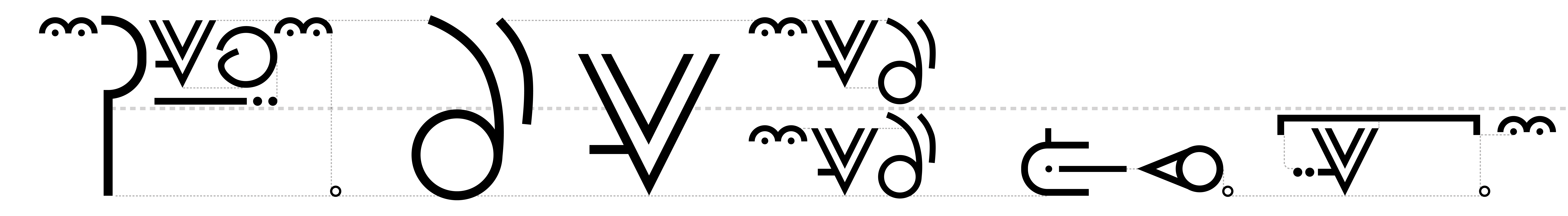
Writing guide for ASLwrite showing how features line up via the dashed lines. From left to right: "HEALTH?."; "F-handshape/9-handshape"; "5-handshape"; (top and bottom) raised eyebrow marker, 5-handshape digit, F-/9-handshape digit, full stop marker; "FINE."; raised eyebrow marker.

The general principle is to capture a single ASL word per segment, from left to right, registering non-manual feature(s), location(s), handshape(s), movement(s) and general orientation. It imagines the writer/speaker is looking down at their hands or viewing words from the profile such that words can be made either as if seen from straight-on or from one's profile.

The digibet captures handshape information as well as orientation, movement and some locations. Locatives are characters that capture location, though handshape diacritics like edge do capture some locations such as edge of palm. Diacritics, such as movements, modify handshapes and can indicate small movements or small orientations. Movements themselves are fairly flexible in their shapes and orientations, which makes digitising this script difficult.

From left to right, up to down, this is the order in which to write characters:

1. Non-manual marks – Often, this is seen as raised or lowered eyebrows, but it can include body or mouth marks such as shoulder-shift and teeth-clench.
2. Frontal or profile locatives – Captures the same location information, just from two perspectives. An example (seen on the right) is the shoulder locative is either a shoulder frontal locative that is written above or below the handshape(s).
3. Handshapes – Can be written before or after the locative. A handshape can be oriented in 360° depending on its location and is written at the end of its movement path if there is one. Each handshape present is written, and when more than one handshape (of one hand) is written, a movement must be present.
  1. Diacritics/movements – Written as a part of the handshape, though larger movements or movements that affect multiple handshapes is written after (see below).
4. Movements – Larger movements or movements that affect multiple handshapes. When a handshape changes without overt movement, the handshapes are written left-to-right with a single movement below, similar to an underline.
5. Non-manual & punctuation marks – These are questioning marks such as why, who, how and how. The stop mark is denoted by a "o" mark.

== Digibet ==
The digibet is composed of handshapes called digits that are modified by diacritics and movements. It shares 23 handshapes with ASL's manual alphabet. Digits are grouped together by features such as +thumb/-thumb or +closed/-closed. In practise, there are 67 digits in ASLwrite's digibet, though that number is growing as new digits are added representing diverse handshapes. Moreover, other languages may adopt this system which would add increasingly more digits.

=== Diacritics ===
There are five diacritics, of which one is a movement diacritic. They are:

1. Hinge
2. Rotational
3. Rattle
4. Flutter
5. Edge

=== Movement ===
Movements are flexible and thus hard to capture in a digital or non-handwritten fashion. The movements are diverse and aim to capture the movements of the hands, arms and body. There are three points – an endpoint, a firmpoint and a contactpoint –, an orbit mark, a steering and a crank mark as well as the movement mark or line. The movement line follows the path of the hand(s) and can be as clean (e.g., – or | ) or as erratic as possible. The points denote the end of a handshape's path and the degree to which the motion is made. A contactpoint denotes an imaginary or in-the-air point with the contactpoint ending at a location and noted as being a firm ending with the firmpoint. The orbit mark indicates a central "point" around which the handshapes orbit; for orbital paths cut short, one would use a steering mark, and for parallel cranking motions, the crank mark would be used.

== Locatives ==
The locatives are characters that denote a specific location on or near the signer's body. They are presented from a face-on and side-view. The two sub-classifications are frontal and profile locatives.

== Non-manual marks ==
Non-manual marks vary quite significantly and can only be placed at the beginning or end of words or phrases. Eyebrow marks are denoted before and after the word(s) in question thus bounding the words that are modified by eyebrow marks. They are called: Raised, Knit, Wan, Slanted and Squint. Questioning marks exist in ASL as logographs that denote ASL's wh-questions such as WHO or FOR-FOR. They are placed after a closed word's or phrase's second eyebrow mark and can exist as an entire sentence alone. Mouth marks are characters that relay what action the mouth is doing. It is placed inside the first eyebrow mark.

=== Body movements ===
Body movements are non-manual, non-facial features such as shoulder shift or head nod. They, as well as nose crinkle, stand alone and can be inserted anywhere, inside and outside of eyebrow-marked phrases.

== Writing samples ==
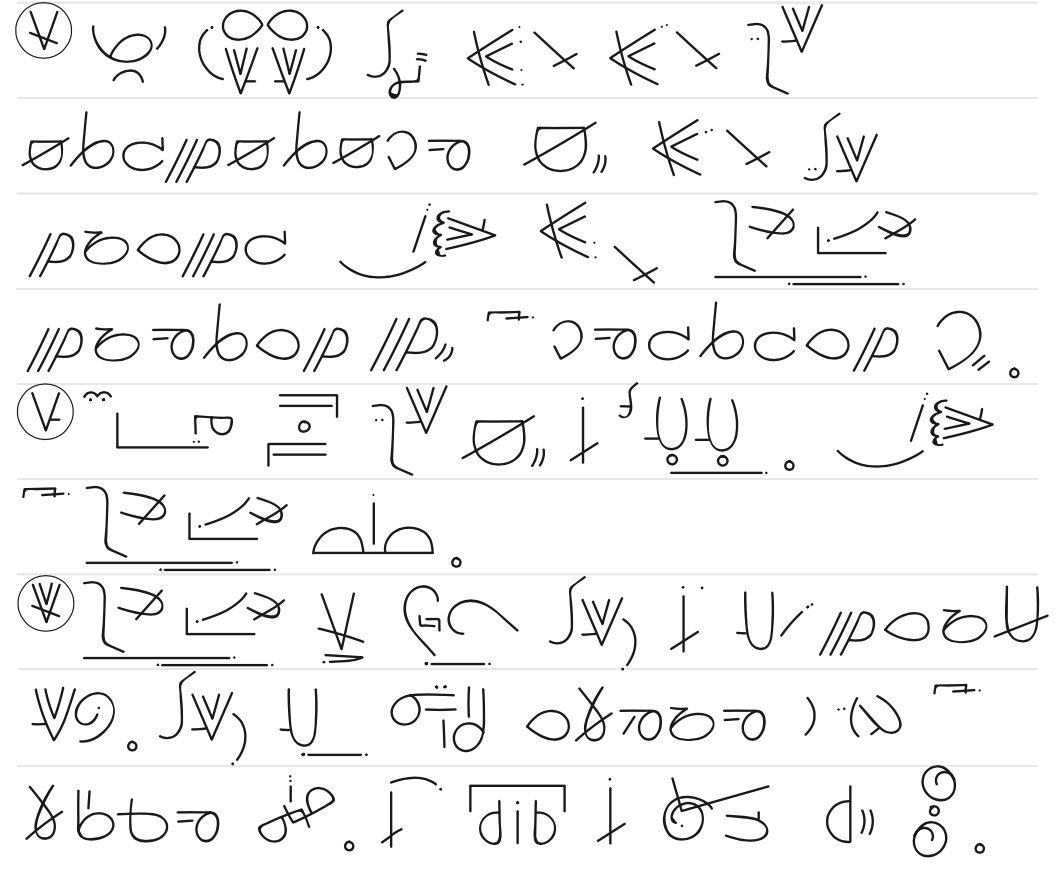

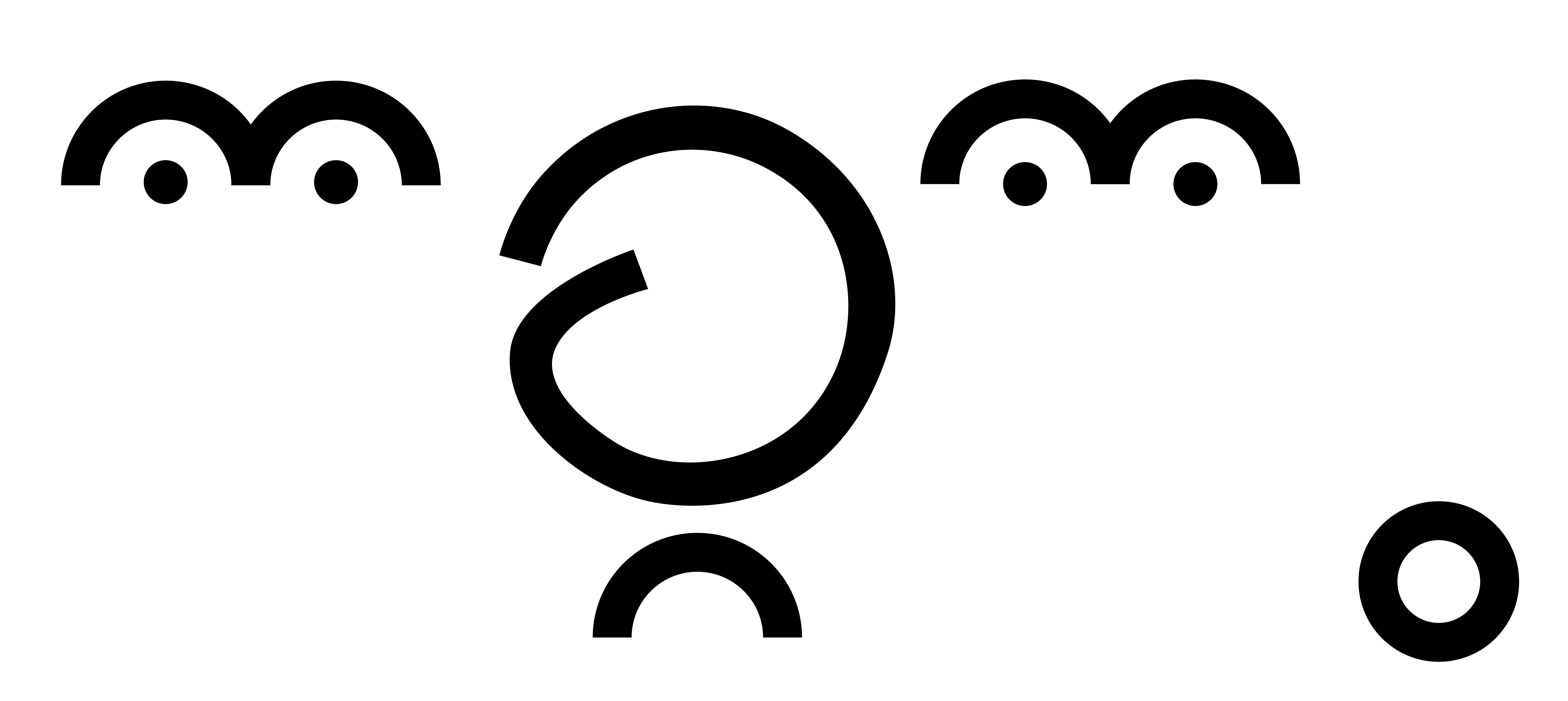

means Yes? in ASL composed of,, and where the raised eyebrow marks at the beginning and the end indicate it is a yes/no question, and the hinge mark denotes that the S handshape digit makes a nodding motion. The circular point at the end is a full stop mark indicating the end of the sentence. Unlike in English writing, the full stop mark is employed for all sentences, even questions (as seen here). Breaks in the sentence, as seen below, are denoted by the shoulder shift mark.

The text sample in this section is from Chapters 1:2–4 of the Book of Ruth. The first quoted text is the verse in English and the second is an ASL gloss.

2. And the man's name was Elimelech, and his wife's name was Naomi, and his two sons' names were Mahlon and Chilion, Ephrathites, from Bethlehem of Judah, and they came to the fields of Moab and remained there.
3. Now Elimelech, Naomi's husband, died, and she was left with her two sons.
4. And they married Moabite women, one named Orpah, and the other named Ruth, and they dwelt there for about ten years.
2. SAME FAMILY WHO LIST-OF-FOUR NUMBER-ONE FATHER E-L-I-M-E-L-E-C-H "E" (ASL name) NUMBER-TWO MOTHER N-A-O-M-I "FLUTTER-FIVE" (ASL name) NUMBERS-THREE-AND-FOUR SON M-A-H-L-O-N "M" (ASL name) SHOULDER-SHIFT C-H-I-L-I-O-N "C" (ASL name).
3. TOP-TIME ADVANCE MAN "E" IX-THEY-SG DIE. "FLUTTER-FIVE" SHOULDER-SHIFT SON CONTINUE.
4. SON THEM-TWO MARRY WOMAN IX-THAT-ONE-THAT-ONE THEIR M-O-A-B AROUND-THERE. WOMEN THEIR NAME O-R-P-A-H "B-TO-NECK" (ASL name) SHOULDER SHIFT R-U-T-H "X-CLASP" (ASL name). IX-THEY-INDEF LIVE IX-THAT COUNTRY TEN YEAR.

— Ruth 1:2–4

== Encoding ==
Due to the complexity of the writing system and its need for flexibility for movements, it means that producing anything in a digital format is difficult. However, there are efforts to create fonts headed by members of its Facebook group, notably looking at proper font creation and using current keyboard characters such as ' } ' or ' _. ' to achieve minor forms of communication in ASL over text. An example phrase is " }_.U- " which means 'thank you' in ASL.

== See also ==
- si5s
- Stokoe notation
- ASL-phabet
- Hamburg Notation System (HamNoSys)
- SignWriting

== Bibliography ==
- ASLian Blog.
- "Si5s Writing LLC | Facebook." Facebook. .
- "Sign Language & Interpreting - Mt. San Antonio College." Mt. San Antonio College
- Twitter
- Write in American Sign Language! Web
