= Sign of the horns =

Hand gesture

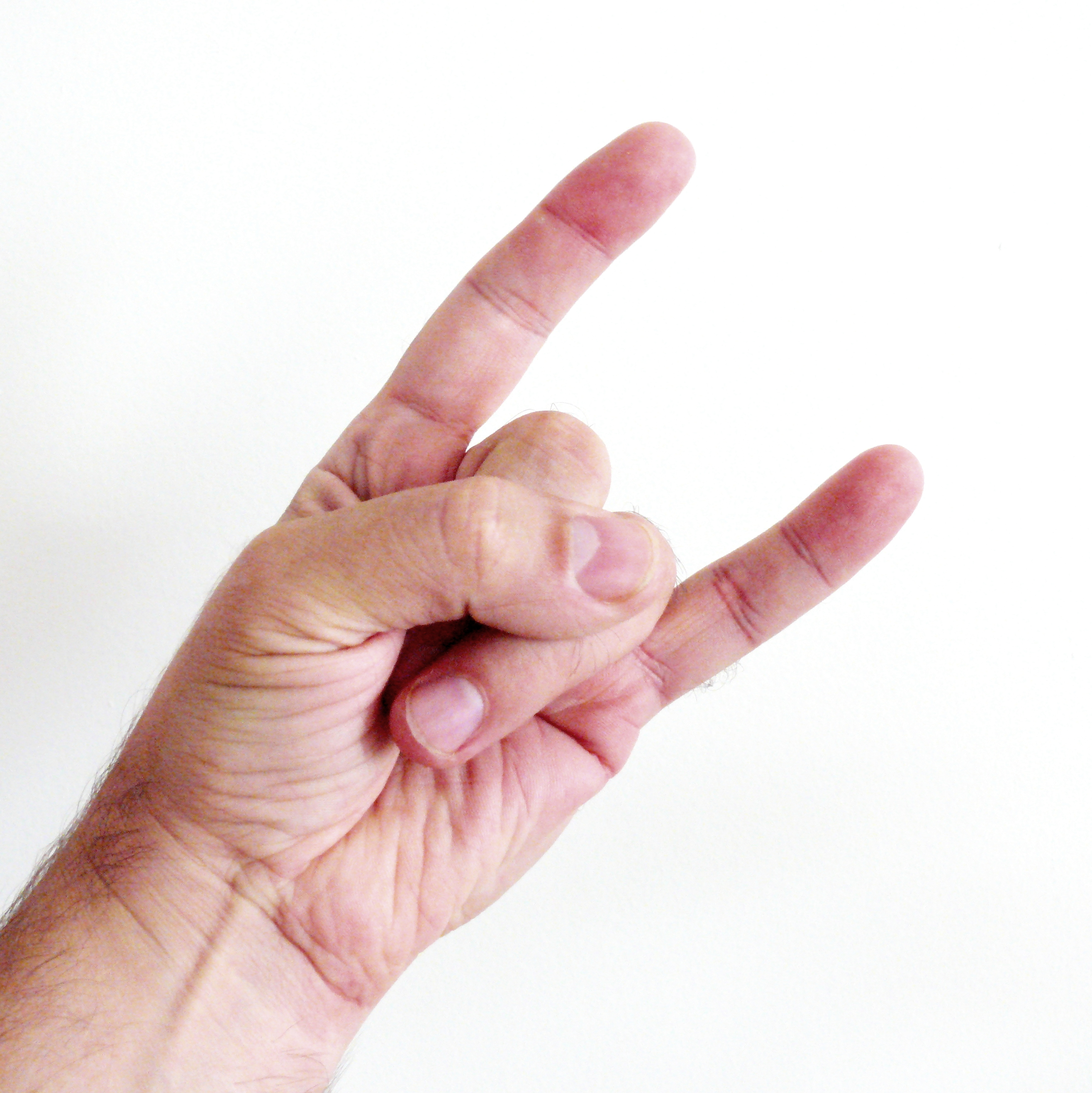
A demonstration of the sign of the horns

The sign of the horns is a hand gesture with a variety of meanings and uses in various cultures. It is formed by extending the index and little fingers while holding the middle and ring fingers down with the thumb.

== Religious and superstitious meaning ==
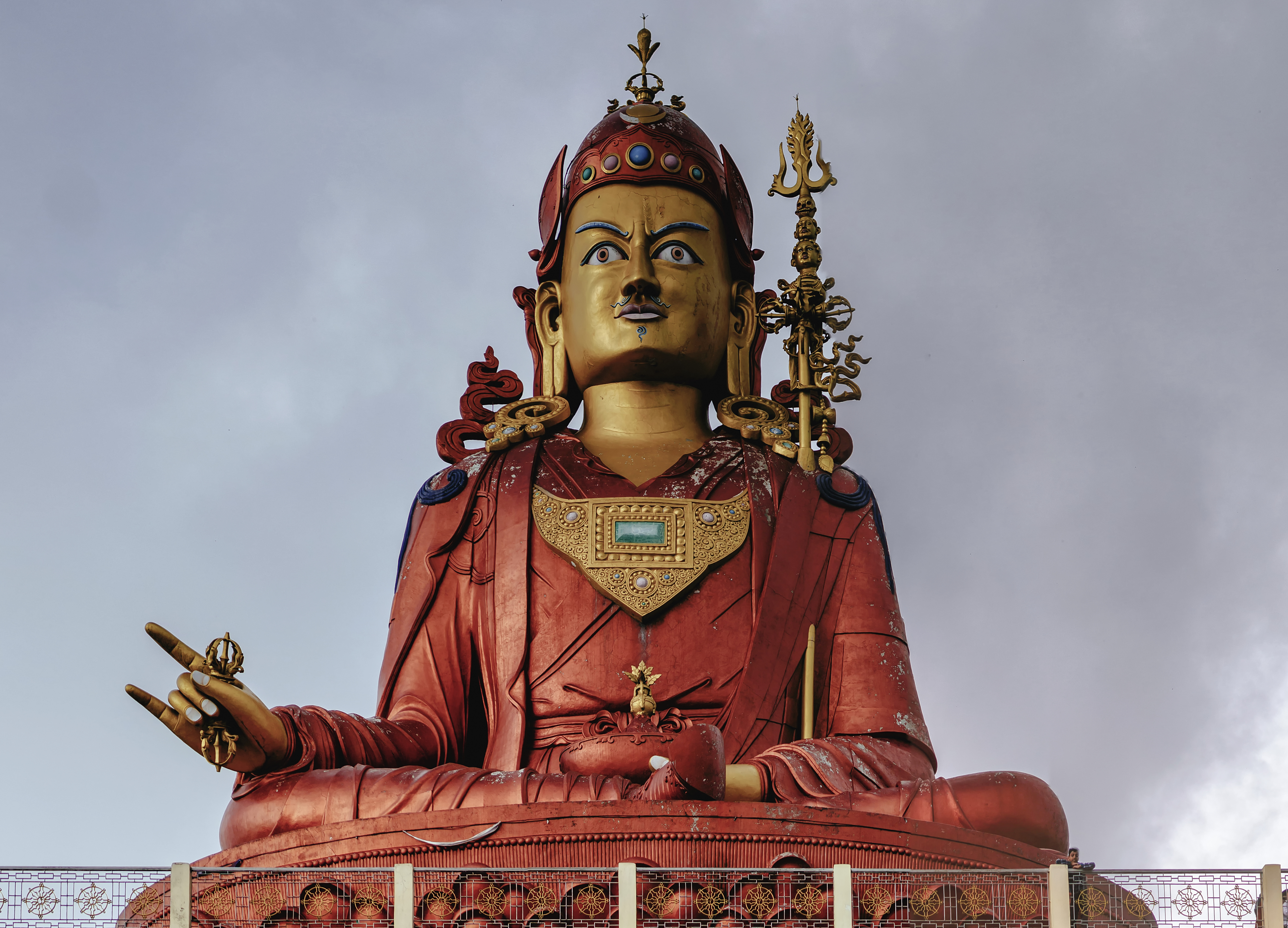
Padmasambhava, the founder of Tibetan Buddhism, showing the Karana Mudrā. The statue is located in Namchi, India.

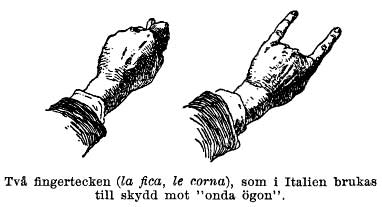
Italian handsigns: la fica, and le corna used for protection against the evil eye

In Hatha Yoga, a similar hand gesture – with the tips of middle and ring finger touching the thumb – is known as Apāna Mudrā, a gesture believed to rejuvenate the body. In Indian classical dance forms, it symbolizes the lion. In Buddhism, the Karana Mudrā is seen as an apotropaic gesture to expel demons, remove negative energy, and ward off evil. It is commonly found on depictions of Gautama Buddha. It is also found on the Song dynasty statue of Laozi, the founder of Taoism, on Mount Qingyuan, China.

An apotropaic usage of the sign can be seen in Italy and in other Mediterranean cultures where, when confronted with unfortunate events, or simply when these events are mentioned, the sign of the horns may be given to ward off further bad luck. It is also used traditionally to counter or ward off the "evil eye" (Italian: malocchio). In Italy specifically, the gesture is known as the corna ('horns'). With fingers pointing down, it is a common Mediterranean apotropaic gesture, by which people seek protection in unlucky situations (a Mediterranean equivalent of knocking on wood). The President of the Italian Republic, Giovanni Leone, startled the media when, while in Naples during an outbreak of cholera, he shook the hands of patients with one hand while with the other behind his back he superstitiously made the corna, presumably to ward off the disease or in reaction to being confronted by such misfortune. Very often it is accompanied by a characteristic superstitious invocation: "Tèee!", a slang form derived from "Tiè!", "Tieni!" ("Hold it!"), second person of the imperative of the verb "Tenere" ("to hold").

In Italy and other parts of the Mediterranean region, the gesture must usually be performed with the fingers tilting downward or in a leveled position not pointed at someone and without movement to signify the warding off of bad luck; in the same region and elsewhere, the gesture may take a different, offensive, and insulting meaning if it is performed with fingers upward or if directed aggressively towards someone especially in a swiveling motion (see section below).

The sign of the horns is used during religious rituals in Wicca, to invoke or represent the Horned God.

In LaVeyan Satanism, the sign of the horns is used as a traditional salutation, either for informal or ritual purposes.

== Offensive gesture ==
In many Mediterranean and Latin countries, such as Colombia, Greece, Italy, Portugal, Spain and Mexico, when directed towards someone, pointed upward, or swiveled back and forth, the sign offensively implies cuckoldry in regard to the targeted individual; the common words for cuckolded in Greek, Italian, Spanish, and Portuguese are, respectively, κερατάς (keratas), cornuto, cornudo and corno, literally meaning "horned [one]". In this particular case, in Italy, the gesture is often accompanied by the invocation: "Cornuto!" ("Cuckold!"). As previously stated above, in Italy and certain other Mediterranean countries, the sign, often when pointing downwards, but occasionally also upwards, can serve also as a talismanic gesture to ward off bad luck. However, the positioning of the hand sign and the context in which it is used generally renders obvious to Italian and other Mediterranean people the meaning of the sign in a particular situation. During a European Union meeting in February 2002, Italian prime minister Silvio Berlusconi was photographed performing in a jocular manner the offensive "cornuto" version of gesture behind the back of Josep Piqué, the Spanish foreign minister.

== Northwestern European and North American popular culture ==
=== Contemporary use by musicians and actors ===
There is a 1927 jazz recording by the New Orleans Owls, "Throwin' the Horns", on 78 rpm, Columbia 1261-D. It has a humorous vocal by two of the band members.

Ike Turner told in an interview that he used the sign in his piano playing on Howlin' Wolf's blues song "How Many More Years" in 1951.

Marlon Brando makes the sign whilst singing "Luck Be a Lady" in the 1955 film Guys and Dolls, seeming to indicate it was a sign for snake eyes in the craps game he is playing for the gamblers' souls.

The 1969 back album cover for Witchcraft Destroys Minds & Reaps Souls on Mercury Records by Chicago-based psychedelic-occult rock band Coven, led by singer Jinx Dawson, pictured Coven band members giving the "sign of the horns". According to a Facebook post by Dawson, she used the sign as early as late 1967 when Coven started, to which she posted a photo showing her giving the sign on stage.

Beginning in the early 1970s, the horns were known as the "P-Funk sign" to fans of Parliament-Funkadelic. It was used by George Clinton and Bootsy Collins as the password to the Mothership, a central element in Parliament's science-fiction mythology, and fans used it in return to show their enthusiasm for the band. Collins is depicted showing the P-Funk sign on the cover of his 1977 album Ahh... The Name Is Bootsy, Baby!.

=== Heavy metal culture ===
Ronnie James Dio was known for popularizing the sign of the horns in heavy metal. He claimed his Catholic Italian grandmother used it to ward off the evil eye (which is known in Italy as malocchio). Dio began using the sign soon after joining the metal band Black Sabbath in 1979. The previous singer in the band, Ozzy Osbourne, was rather well known for using the "peace" sign at concerts, raising the index and middle finger in the form of a V. Dio, in an attempt to connect with the fans, wanted to similarly use a hand gesture. However, not wanting to copy Osbourne, he chose to use the sign his grandmother always made. The horns became famous in metal concerts very soon after Black Sabbath's first tour with Dio. The sign would later be appropriated by heavy metal fans.

Geezer Butler of Black Sabbath can be seen "raising the horns" in a photograph taken in 1969. The photograph is included in the CD booklet of the Symptom of the Universe: The Original Black Sabbath 1970–1978 2002 compilation album. This would indicate that there had been some association between the "horns" and heavy metal before Dio's popularization of it. Although the Beatles are not directly associated with heavy metal, John Lennon can be seen doing the "horn-sign" in a photograph already two years prior to Butler, but it's more likely to be the ILY sign. The photoshoot was done for the promotion for their upcoming cartoon movie Yellow Submarine in late 1967. The official movie poster of 1968 showing the Beatles in cartoon form depicts Lennon performing the same gesture.

When asked if he was the one who introduced the hand gesture to metal subculture, Dio said in a 2001 interview:

I doubt very much if I would be the first one who ever did that. That's like saying I invented the wheel, I'm sure someone did that at some other point. I think you'd have to say that I made it fashionable. I used it so much and all the time and it had become my trademark until the Britney Spears audience decided to do it as well. So it kind of lost its meaning with that. But it was ... I was in Sabbath at the time. It was a symbol that I thought was reflective of what that band was supposed to be all about. It's not the devil's sign like we're here with the devil. It's an Italian thing I got from my Grandmother called the "Malocchio". It's to ward off the Evil Eye or to give the Evil Eye, depending on which way you do it. It's just a symbol but it had magical incantations and attitudes to it and I felt it worked very well with Sabbath. So I became very noted for it and then everybody else started to pick up on it and away it went. But I would never say I take credit for being the first to do it. I say because I did it so much that it became the symbol of rock and roll of some kind.

Gene Simmons of the rock group Kiss attempted to claim the "devil horns" hand gesture for his own. Simmons filed an application in June 2017 with the United States Patent and Trademark Office for a trademark on the hand gesture he regularly shows during concerts and public appearances—thumb, index, and pinky fingers extended, with the middle and ring fingers folded down (like the ILY sign meaning "I love you" in the American Sign Language). According to Simmons, this hand gesture was first commercially used—by him—on November 14, 1974. He claimed the hand gesture should be trademarked for "entertainment, namely live performances by a musical artist [and] personal appearances by a musical artist." Simmons abandoned the application two weeks later.

The Japanese kawaii metal band Babymetal uses the kitsune sign, their own variation of the sign of the horns, symbolizing their personal deity, the Fox God. The middle, ring finger, and thumb join at the tips to form the snout, the extended index and pinky fingers are the ears. This gesture is similar in appearance to the salute of the Turanist Grey Wolves movement.

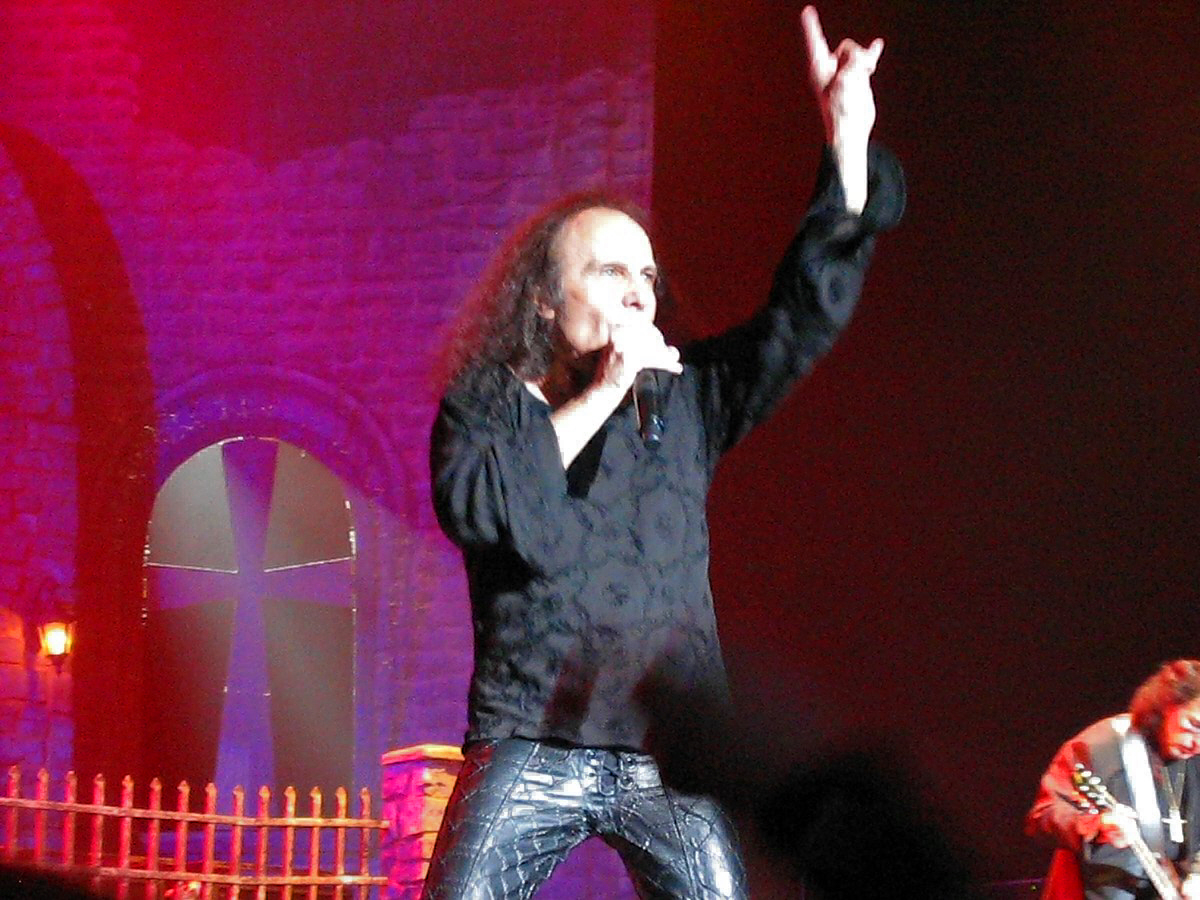
Ronnie James Dio at a concert in 2007

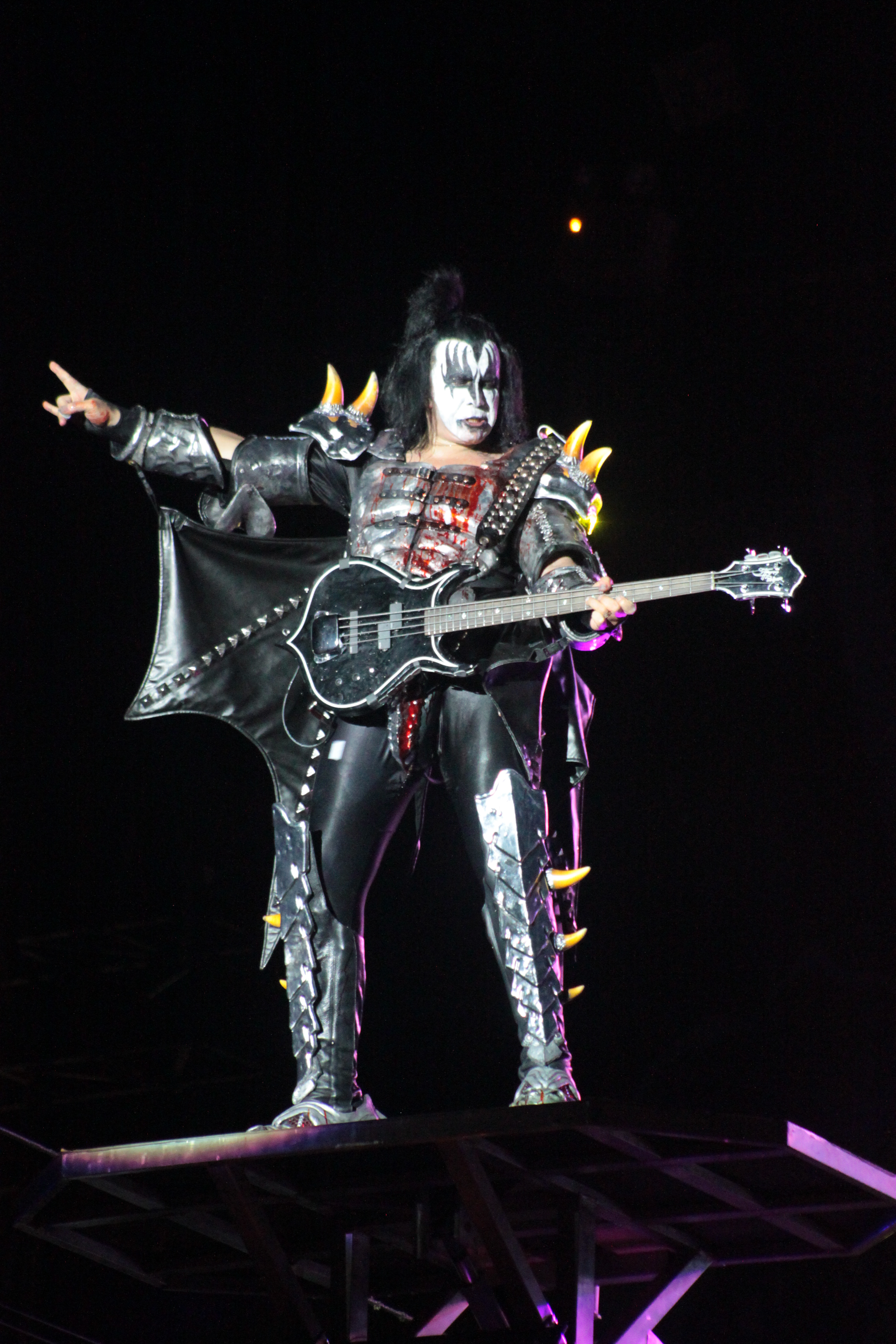
Gene Simmons of Kiss, at Hellfest in 2013

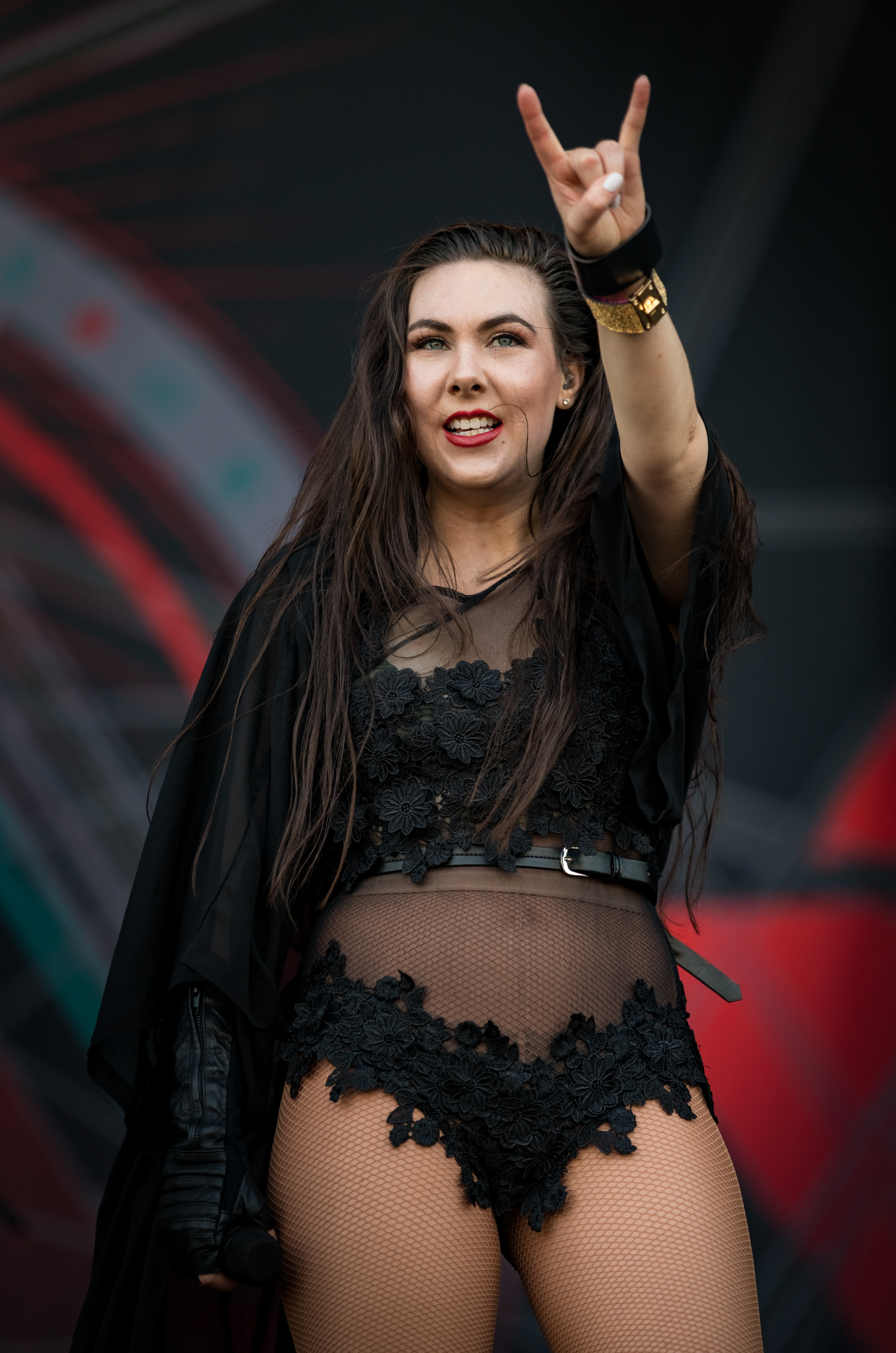
Elize Ryd of Amaranthe at Wacken Open Air in 2018

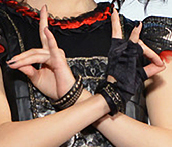
Yuimetal, showing the kitsune sign, 2015

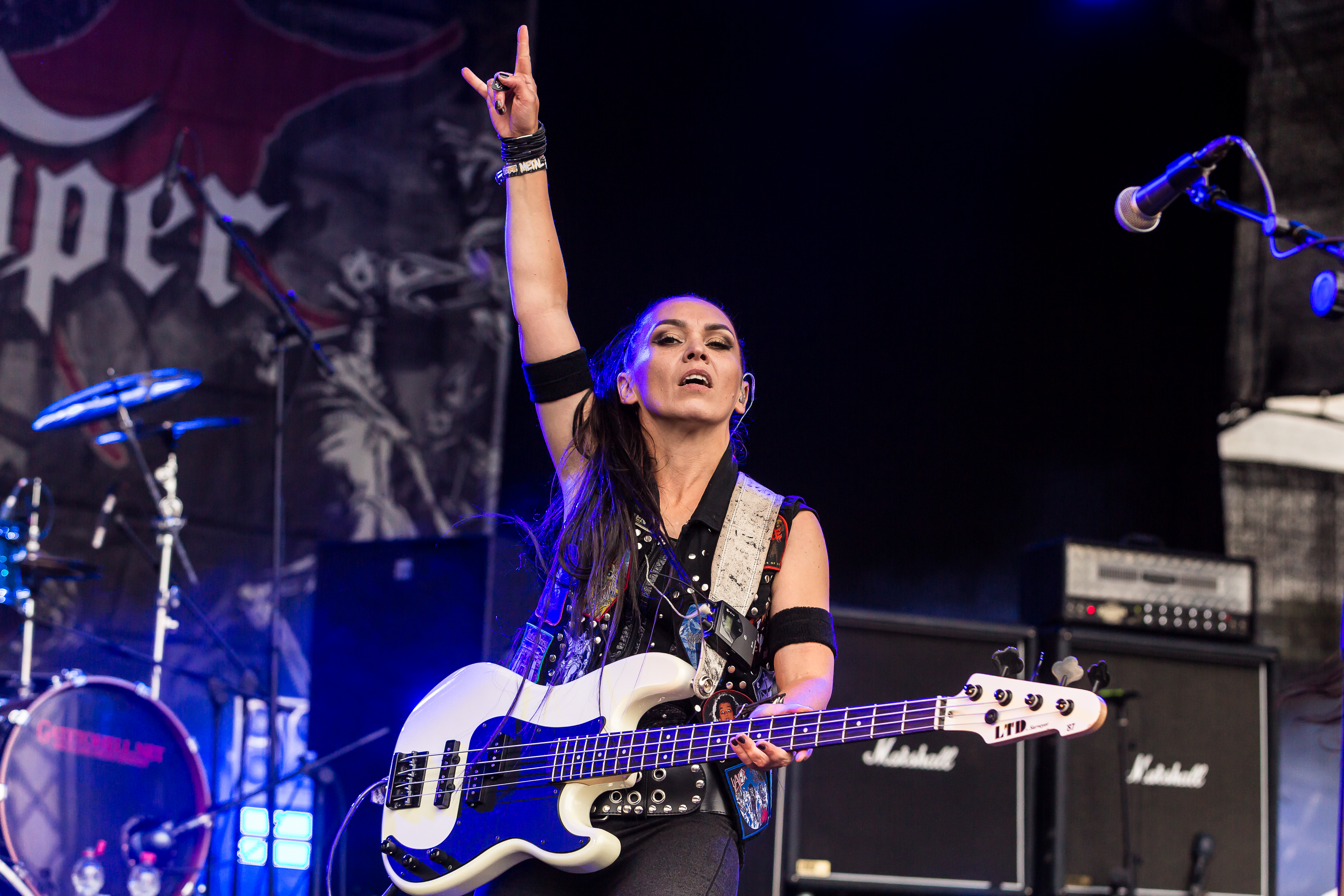
Marta Gabriel of Crystal Viper at the Metal Frenzy concert, 2024

=== Electronic communication ===
In text-based electronic communication, the sign of the horns is represented with the \../, \m/ or |m| emoticon and sometimes with /../. The Unicode character U+1F918 🤘 SIGN OF THE HORNS was introduced in Unicode 8.0 as an emoji, on June 17, 2015.

=== Gang hand signal ===
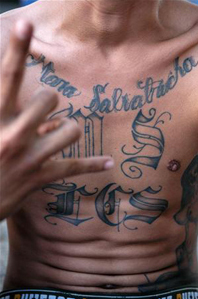
An MS-13 gang member displays "sign of the horns" gang sign

The "sign of the horns" hand gesture is used in criminal gang subcultures to indicate membership or affiliation with Mara Salvatrucha. The significance is both the resemblance of an inverted "devil horns" to the Latin letter 'M', and in the broader demonic connotation, of fierceness and nonconformity.

=== Sports culture ===
Fans of Houston sports teams use the hand signal as a sign of support for the city's sports teams. Rising to prominence through Houston's hip-hop culture, this signal has become the de facto hand signal for the city. Referred to as "H's up" by the Houston Texans, this signal has been described as "featur[ing] the back of the hand facing out, hand held in front of the chest, and both middle and ring fingers curled under the thumb, with the index and pinky fingers straight like a bull's horns." This signal has also been promoted by the Houston Astros, Houston Rockets, Houston Cougars, and Houston Dynamo FC.

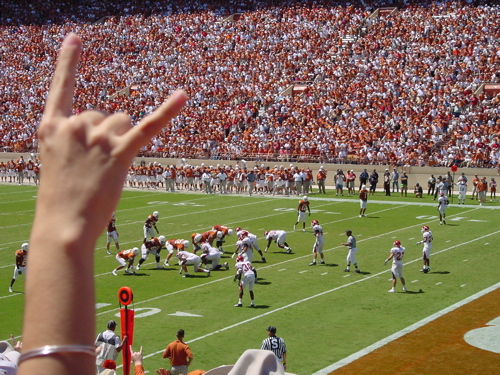
A fan displays the Hook 'em Horns during a Texas football game versus Arkansas.

Hook 'em Horns is the slogan and hand signal of the University of Texas at Austin (UT). Students and alumni of the university employ a greeting consisting of the phrase "Hook 'em" or "Hook 'em Horns" and also use the phrase as a parting good-bye or as the closing line in a letter or story. The gesture is meant to approximate the shape of the head and horns of the UT mascot, the Texas Longhorn Bevo. Rival schools such as the Oklahoma Sooners or Texas A&M Aggies will turn the horns upside down meaning "Horns Down" as an insult.

Fans of the Utah State University Aggies use the same hand sign at their athletic events, similarly representing bull horns, a reference to their agricultural roots and mascot, Big Blue.

Fans of University of South Florida Bulls athletics also use the hand sign, except that the hand is turned around and facing the other way. With the middle and ring finger extending towards the person presenting the "Go Bulls" sign.

Fans of North Dakota State University Bison athletics also use a similar hand gesture, known as "Go Bison!" The pinky and index fingers are usually slightly bent, however, to mimic the shape of a bison's horns.

Fans of North Carolina State University Wolfpack athletics use a similar gesture with the middle and ring fingers moving up and down over the thumb to mimic a wolf's jaw.

Fans of University of California, Irvine Anteaters use a similar sign with the middle and ring fingers out to resemble the head of an anteater.

Fans of University of Nevada, Reno Wolf Pack athletics use a similar sign with the middle and ring fingers out to resemble the wolf's snout.

A variation of this hand gesture is also used in the professional wrestling industry, which fans dub the "Too Sweet". It was possibly innovated by Scott Hall and the other members of The Kliq based on the Turkish Grey Wolves organization hand gesture according to Sean Waltman, and has since been attributed to other wrestling groups such as the nWo and Bullet Club, as well as individual wrestlers such as Finn Bálor.

Fans of University of Utah athletics, particularly football and gymnastics, use a gesture where the index and pinky finger are straight and parallel to each other, forming a block "U."

Fans of Northwestern State University Demon athletics also use a similar hand gesture, known as "Fork 'em!" The pinky and index fingers are extended but a little more parallel to each other resembling the horns on a demon.

Arizona State University Sun Devil fans make a pitchfork sign by extending the index and middle fingers, as well as the pinky. The thumb holds down the ring finger to complete the gesture.

Fans of the Wichita State University Shockers frequently hold up their middle finger in addition to the pointer and pinky fingers as a reference to the comic sexual act.

Fans of the Grand Canyon University Antelopes use this hand gesture with a slight variation by touching the tips of the ring and middle finger with the thumb to form the shape of an antelope and its horns. Often followed by the phrase "Lopes up".

Fans of the Universidad de Chile soccer team use this gesture to represent their support for the team by forming a U-shaped hand gesture, often followed by the phrase "Grande la U".

Fans of University at Buffalo Buffalo Bulls athletics use the same hand sign at their athletic events. This gesture is meant to resemble a bull's horns.

In 2018, the University of Missouri-Kansas City started using a variation of the hand gesture to indicate the head of a kangaroo with the phrase "Roo Up."

== Russian culture ==
In Russian children's folklore the sign of the horns (called koza, "goat") is associated with the nursery rhyme "Идёт коза рогатая" ("Here comes a horned goat"). When telling the rhyme to a toddler, the narrator tickles the child with the "horns" at the end of the rhyme.

== See also ==
- Cornicello
- The Grey Wolves salute may be confused with this gesture.
- The ILY sign is sometimes confused with this gesture because many users tend to do the "horns" improperly by extending their thumb.
- Shaka sign
