= Latin cross =

Type of cross and symbol of Christianity

A crux immissa or Latin cross

A Latin cross or crux immissa is a type of Christian cross in which the vertical beam sticks above the crossbeam, giving the cross four arms. Typically, the two horizontal and upper vertical arms are the same length, although sometimes the vertical is shorter; however, the lower vertical arm is always much longer than any other arm.

When displayed upside down, it is called St. Peter's Cross, because according to Catholic tradition, he was executed on a cross of this type. When displayed sideways, it is called St. Philip's cross for an analogous reason.

Many churches of different time periods are designed using the Latin cross plan. When looked at from above, it takes the shape of a Latin cross. A Latin cross plan primarily contains a nave, transept, apse, and narthex.

== History ==
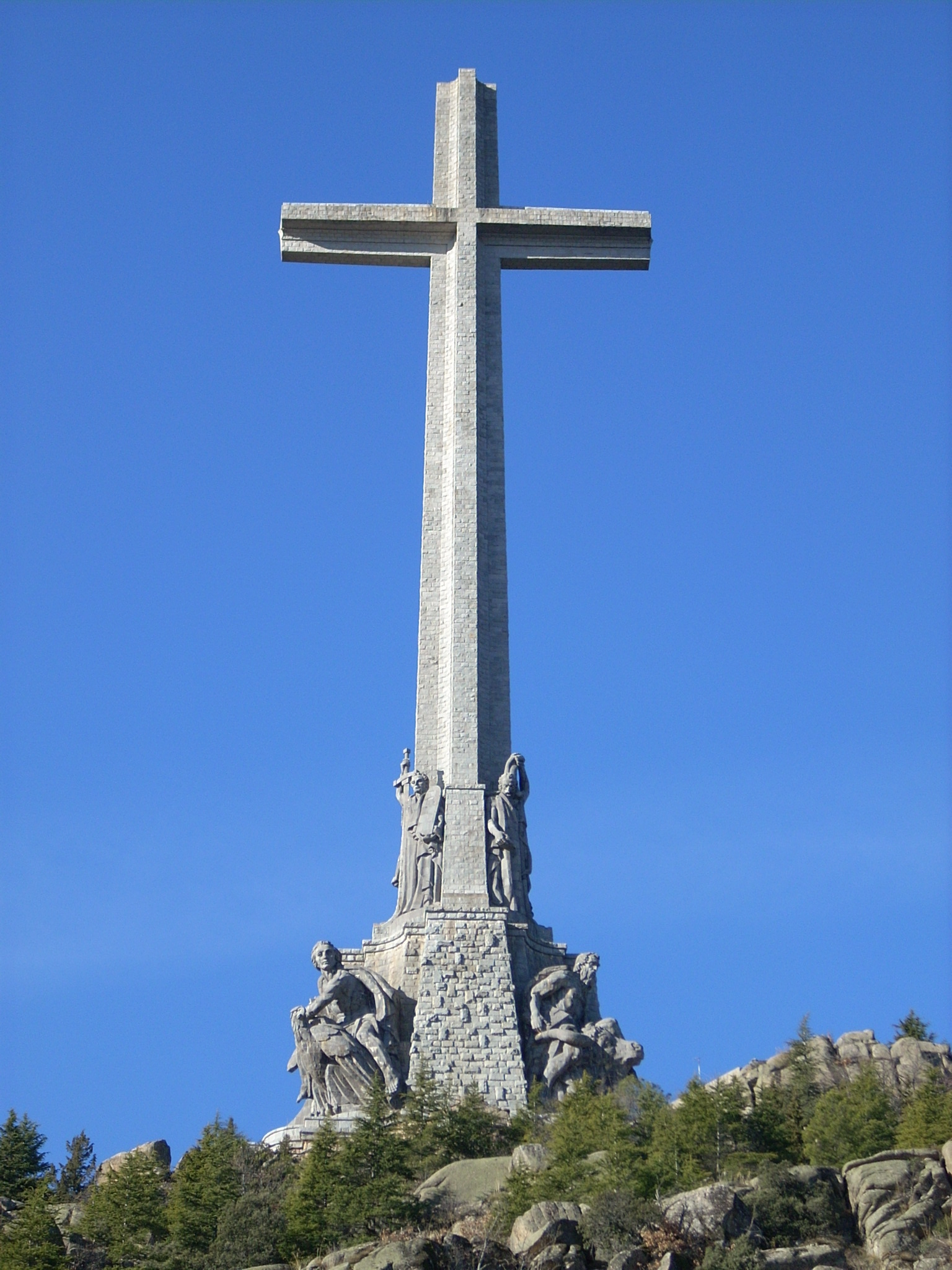
The Latin cross at the Valley of the Fallen in Spain is the tallest Christian cross in the world, at 150 meters.

In contemporary usage, the Latin cross is mostly used to represent all of Christianity and Christendom, depicting the central Christian tenet that Jesus sacrificed himself for humanity upon it, atoning for the sins of the world. It is especially used among the denominations of Western Christianity, including the Roman Catholic tradition and several Protestant traditions, such as Lutheranism, Moravianism, Anglicanism, Methodism, and Reformed Christianity, as well as by Anabaptists, Baptists, and Pentecostals. In certain periods, such as during the 16th-century English Reformation of the Anglican Church, the Latin cross was disfavored by a minority of theologians such as Nicholas Ridley, though in the overall history of the Western Christian Churches, this was short-lived.

== Cruciform churches ==
Color-coded Latin cross floor plan

A Latin cross plan is a floor plan found in many Christian churches and cathedrals. When looked at from above or in plan view it takes the shape of a Latin cross (crux immissa). Such cruciform churches were very common in the West during the Romanesque period. The ideal church plan tended to be symmetrical around a central point during the Renaissance. The longer arm of the Latin cross plan is the nave, which runs on an east–west axis and traditionally contains aisles or chapels. The transept crosses the nave, running north–south, and can be the same width as the nave, or extend further on both sides to create a more pronounced cross shape. The east end is the apse, which traditionally contains the choir, chancel, or presbytery. Many also have a narthex at the entry.

=== Examples of cathedrals with a Latin cross plan ===
- Old St. Peter's Basilica is a cathedral in Rome, Italy, that was consecrated in 326 AD
- Chartres Cathedral is a cathedral in Chartres, France, that was constructed between 1194 and 1220
- Siena Cathedral is a cathedral in Siena, Italy, that was completed between 1215 and 1263
- Cologne Cathedral is a cathedral in Cologne, Germany, that began construction in 1248, but was halted in 1590, unfinished until 1880
- Notre-Dame is a cathedral in Paris, France, that was largely completed by 1260
- Florence Cathedral is a cathedral in Florence, Italy, that was structurally completed in 1436

== In computer systems ==
The glyph has a unicode code point: U+271D ✝ LATIN CROSS

=== Similar marks ===
- U+2628 ☨ CROSS OF LORRAINE
- U+2020 † DAGGER
- U+2021 ‡ DOUBLE DAGGER

== See also ==
- Christian symbolism
- Christian cross
- Greek cross
