= Inverted cross =

Religious symbol

An inverted cross

The inverted cross (𐕣), also known as the upside-down cross, is a symbol that has been used in both Christian and anti-Christian contexts. Historically, it is most commonly associated with Saint Peter, who, according to tradition, was crucified upside down and for whom the symbol represents humility and martyrdom. In the modern era, the inverted Latin cross has also been adopted in anti-Christian and Satanic symbolism to signify opposition to Christianity.

== Christian symbolism ==
The inverted cross is traditionally known as the Cross of Saint Peter, Crux Inversa, or Petrine Cross. According to Christian tradition, Saint Peter was crucified upside down, as he did not consider himself worthy to die in the same manner as Jesus. As a result, the symbol has been used in Christian iconography, particularly within the Catholic Church, as a symbol of humility.

== Anti-Christian use ==
In the 19th and 20th centuries, some anti-Christian groups, occult traditions, and Satanic movements repurposed the inverted cross as a symbol of defiance against Christianity. Unlike its use in Christian tradition, here it is meant to invert or subvert Christian teachings. The inverted cross is a recurring motif in metal music, particularly black metal, in congruity with its anti-Christian themes.

=== In literature ===
Joris-Karl Huysmans' novel Là-bas (1891) describes a Black Mass where participants wear vestments with inverted crosses. The character 'Docteur Johannès' was based on the 19th-century French mystic Eugène Vintras (1807–1875), who incorporated the Petrine Cross into his vestments, particularly on his stole, as part of his movement's esoteric Christian symbolism.

The Inverted Cross (La Cruz Invertida) by Argentine writer Marcos Aguinis (1970) is a political and social novel set in an unnamed Latin American country, exploring themes of upheaval, identity, and dictatorship. It critically examines human contradictions and the continent's struggles for unity.

=== In popular culture ===
Many horror films use inverted crosses as part of their imagery and marketing, especially if the film involves demonic themes. Examples include The Amityville Horror, The Conjuring, Paranormal Activity, and 28 Years Later. At the end of Rosemary's Baby, an upside down cross hangs over the bassinet containing Satan's son.

In the 2001 band Gorillaz, Murdoc, the self-proclaimed leader of the band and bassist, is a satanist and wears the inverted cross.

Glen Benton of the band Deicide branded an inverted cross onto his forehead.

Former Black Sabbath drummer Bill Ward suggested that the use of an inverted cross on the inner gatefold sleeve of their debut album by their label Vertigo may have been a promotional ploy or a misunderstanding of the nature of the group.

Then-indie hip hop artist Tyler, the Creator drew the cross on his forehead for his portrait in the deluxe album cover for his 2011 album Goblin. Similarly, experimental trap artist Playboi Carti utilized the upside down cross for his 2020 album Whole Lotta Red. On the cover, Carti is depicted wearing an inverted crucifix pendant. This piece of jewelry has remained a staple with his outfits, and his fellow Opium signee Ken Carson has inserted the iconography into the cover for his 2023 album A Great Chaos.
