= Eugène Vintras =

French religious leader and mystic

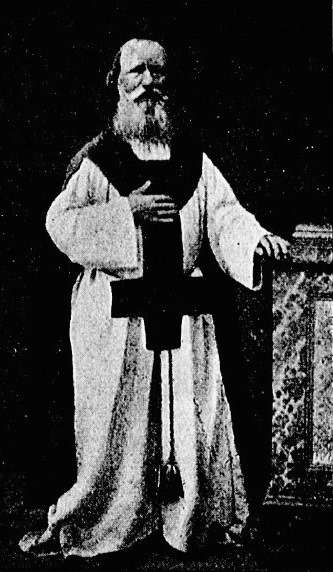
- Born: April 7, 1807; Bayeux, France
- Died: December 7, 1875; Lyon, France
- Known for: Founding the Œuvre de la Miséricorde, mystical revelations

Eugène Vintras (7 April 1807 – 7 December 1875) was a French religious mystic who founded the controversial sect known as the Œuvre de la Miséricorde ("Work of Mercy"). He claimed to receive divine visions and to be the reincarnation of the prophet Elijah. Vintras' movement was marked by mysticism and ritual innovations, and it received opposition from both the Catholic Church and the French authorities.

== Early life and spiritual awakening ==
Vintras was born in Bayeux, Normandy, in 1807, the illegitimate child of Marie Vintras. He spent part of his childhood in religious institutions and later worked as a tailor and a traveling salesman. Financial struggles marked his early life, and he eventually settled in Tilly-sur-Seulles.

In November 1839, while employed at a cardboard factory, Vintras claimed to have had visions of Archangel Michael, the Virgin Mary and Saint Joseph. This event was followed by what he described as miraculous occurrences and spiritual communications, including a letter from a secret monarchist society known as the "Saviours of Louis XVII." The letter recognized Vintras as a divinely chosen prophet, ushering in a new spiritual era for France.

== The Œuvre de la Miséricorde and its condemnation ==
The Œuvre de la Miséricorde grew rapidly, and 6,000 copies of a pamphlet on Vintras and his miracles were circulated. Liturgical innovations included the use of red hosts symbolizing blood and chalices spontaneously filled with wine—phenomena his followers believed to be miracles. These practices, however, aroused suspicion from Church authorities.

Vintras was arrested in 1842 by French authorities and sentenced to five years in prison for fraud and moral subversion. In 1843, Pope Gregory XVI formally condemned the movement in the papal letter Ubi novam, denouncing it as heretical and dangerous. Following his release from prison, Vintras continued to preach and even spent time in exile in London, England.

Eugène Vintras died in Lyon in 1875.

== Influence ==
Vintras's teachings and controversial spiritual claims attracted the attention of several notable occultists of the 19th century. Éliphas Lévi, a French ceremonial magician and writer, initially associated with Vintras but later distanced himself, denouncing him as a false prophet. In his writings, Lévi acknowledged the powerful magnetism of Vintras and the sincerity of his followers but criticized the movement's excesses and claimed that its mystical phenomena bordered on the diabolical.

Arthur Edward Waite, the English mystic and historian of esotericism, also commented on Vintras in his studies of occult and mystical traditions. Waite regarded Vintras as a complex and enigmatic figure, and included him in his broader analysis of mystical messianism in France.
