= Seth Pollak =

American psychologist

- Born: Silver Spring, Maryland, U.S.
- Education: Franklin & Marshall College (AB); Harvard University (MA); University of Rochester (PhD)
- Known for: Research on children's emotional development and early-life stress
- Spouse: Jenny Saffran (m. 1998)
- Children: 2
- Scientific career
- Fields: Developmental psychology, affective science, developmental psychopathology
- Workplaces: University of Wisconsin–Madison
- Website: childemotion.waisman.wisc.edu

Seth David Pollak is an American developmental psychologist and professor at the University of Wisconsin–Madison. He is the Vaughan Bascom Professor of Psychology and the Steenbock–Russell–Slichter Professor of Psychology, a Wisconsin Alumni Research Foundation named professorship. He also holds appointments in anthropology, pediatrics and public affairs and is an investigator at the university's Waisman Center. His research examines how children's early social experiences and exposure to stress are associated with emotional, cognitive and neurobiological development. Pollak was elected to the American Academy of Arts and Sciences in 2020 and received a Guggenheim Fellowship in 2021.

== Early life and education ==
Pollak was born in Silver Spring, Maryland, and grew up in New Jersey. He received an AB summa cum laude in philosophy and cultural anthropology from Franklin & Marshall College in 1988 and was elected to Phi Beta Kappa. He completed part of his undergraduate studies at the University of Oxford, where he studied philosophy of mind and cultural anthropology.

Pollak earned a master's degree in human development from Harvard University in 1989. In 1997, he received a joint doctoral degree in child clinical psychology and brain and cognitive sciences from the University of Rochester. His graduate mentors included Dante Cicchetti, Richard N. Aslin, Elissa L. Newport and Rafael Klorman. He subsequently completed a clinical internship at the University of Toronto.

== Career ==
Pollak joined the psychology faculty at the University of Wisconsin–Madison as an assistant professor in 1997. He has held the title of College of Letters and Science Distinguished Professor since 2006. He was named Vaughan Bascom Professor of Psychology in 2022. In 2026, he received a WARF Named Professorship as the Steenbock–Russell–Slichter Professor of Psychology. His additional university appointments have included anthropology, pediatrics, psychiatry and public affairs. He is also a research associate at the Institute of Cognitive Sciences and Technologies, part of the Italian National Research Council, in Rome.

Pollak has held visiting appointments at the Montreal Neurological Institute at McGill University and the American Academy in Rome. He was a member of the board of directors of the Association for Psychological Science from 2020 to 2023 and served on the governing council of the Society for Research in Child Development from 2013 to 2019. He helped establish the society's Victoria S. Levin Award for Early Career Success in Young Children's Mental Health and has chaired its selection committee. He was also a founding director of the Waisman Center's Morse Interdisciplinary Scholar Training Program.

== Research ==
Pollak's research concerns children's emotional development, learning and the developmental effects of stress and adversity. His work draws on developmental psychology, neuroscience, psychophysiology and endocrinology. In his theoretical work, called the Topological Approach to Adversity and Development, Pollak has emphasized that children's responses to events depend partly on how they perceive and interpret their experiences, rather than on external events producing uniform effects across individuals. He has compared emotion learning with language acquisition, proposing that both draw on children's ability to detect statistical regularities in their environment.

=== Emotion ===
Pollak has examined how early social experience is associated with the perception and categorization of emotion. In studies comparing children who had experienced physical abuse with other children, Pollak and his collaborators reported differences in the recognition and categorization of facial expressions, particularly expressions involving anger.

Pollak was one of the authors of a 2019 review that questioned whether particular facial movements can be treated as reliable, universal indicators of specific emotional states. He later co-authored a review of the concept of arousal in psychological theories, arguing that evidence for a single nonspecific state of activation is mixed.

=== Stress and adversity ===
Pollak and his collaborators have argued that broad categories such as abuse, neglect or poverty should not be assumed to have uniform or biologically specific effects. They have instead advocated examining the processes through which children perceive, interpret and respond to their circumstances.

In a 2017 study, Pollak and colleagues reported an association between childhood stress exposure and differences in the brain's reward system, as well as decision-making in adulthood. An earlier study associated childhood stress with elevated antibody levels to herpes simplex virus type 1, a marker of latent-virus control and immune function.

=== Poverty and developmental risk ===
Pollak has also studied associations between household income and children's neurodevelopment. A 2013 longitudinal study by Pollak and colleagues reported that differences in gray-matter growth between children from lower- and higher-income households became more pronounced during infancy and early childhood. In 2015, Pollak, economist Barbara Wolfe and their co-authors reported that household poverty was associated with differences in children's brain structure and that these differences statistically accounted for part of the association between poverty and academic achievement. JAMA Pediatrics published an accompanying editorial about the study. The findings were later discussed in Scientific American, which noted that the research was correlational and did not establish that poverty caused the observed brain differences.

In later research, Pollak and colleagues found that childhood unpredictability was associated with reduced exploratory behavior and a preference for familiar options. His reviews of the field have called for researchers to identify specific features of children's environments and the processes linking those experiences to development rather than relying only on broad cumulative labels such as "adversity" or "risk".

== Honors and awards ==
- 2001 – University of Wisconsin–Madison Chancellor's Distinguished Teaching Award (Steiger Award)
- 2003 – Boyd McCandless Award from Division 7 of the American Psychological Association
- 2006 – APA Distinguished Scientific Award for an Early Career Contribution to Psychology
- 2009 – Fellow of the American Association for the Advancement of Science
- 2018 – Kellett Mid-Career Award from the University of Wisconsin–Madison
- 2020 – Elected to the American Academy of Arts and Sciences
- 2021 – Guggenheim Fellowship

Pollak is also a fellow of the Association for Psychological Science.

== Personal life ==
Pollak married psychologist Jenny Saffran in 1998. They have two children.
