= Supalla =

Supalla is a surname. Notable people with the surname include:

- Samuel James Supalla (born 1957), American musician
- Ted Supalla, American linguist and sign language researcher
