= Iconicity =

Aspect of linguistics and semiotics

In functional-cognitive linguistics, as well as in semiotics, iconicity is the conceived similarity or analogy between the form of a sign (linguistic or otherwise) and its meaning, as opposed to arbitrariness (which is typically assumed in structuralist, formalist and generative approaches to linguistics). The principle of iconicity is also shared by the approach of linguistic typology.

Iconic principles:

- Quantity principle: conceptual complexity corresponds to formal complexity
- Proximity principle: conceptual distance tends to match linguistic distance
- Sequential order principle: the sequential order of events described is mirrored in the speech chain

== Quantity principle ==
The use of quantity of phonetic material to iconically mark increased quality or quantity can be noted in the lengthening of words to indicate a greater degree, such as "looong". It is also common to use reduplication to iconically mark increase, as Edward Sapir is quoted, “The process is generally employed, with self-evident symbolism, to indicate such concepts as distribution, plurality, repetition, customary activity, increase of size, added intensity, continuance” (1921:79). This has been confirmed by the comparative studies of Key (1965) and Moravcsik (1978). This can be seen, for example, in Amharic, where täsäbbärä means "it was broken" and täsäbbabärä means that "it was shattered".

Iconic coding principles may be natural tendencies in language and are also part of our cognitive and biological make-up. Whether iconicity is a part of language is an open debate in linguistics. For instance, Haspelmath has argued against iconicity, claiming that most iconic phenomena can be explained by frequency biases: since simpler meanings tend to be more frequent in the language use they tend to lose phonological material.

Onomatopoeia (and mimesis more broadly) may be seen as a kind of iconicity, though even onomatopoeic sounds have a large degree of arbitrariness.

== The evolution of language ==
Derek Bickerton has posited that iconic signs, both verbal and gestural, were crucial in the evolution of human language. Animal communication systems, Bickerton has argued, are largely composed of indexical (and, occasionally, iconic) signs, whereas in human language, "most words are symbolic, and ... without symbolic words we couldn’t have language". The distinction Bickerton draws between these categories is one of displacement, with the indexical signs of animal communication systems having no capacity for displacement, and the symbolic signs of human language requiring it. Iconic signs, however, "may or may not have it depending on how they’re used ... iconicity, therefore, is the most probable road that our ancestors took into language".

Using a niche-construction view of human evolution, Bickerton has hypothesized that human ancestors used iconic signs as recruitment signals in the scavenging of dead megafauna. This process "would have created new words and deployed old words in new contexts, further weakening the uncoupling of words from situations, from current occurrence—even from fitness", and thus allowing for the creation of symbolic language.

In The Symbolic Species, Terrence Deacon argues that the emanation of symbolic capacities unique to language was a critical factor in the evolution of the human brain, and that these symbolic capacities are vital to differentiating animal from human forms of communication, processes of learning, and brain anatomy. "The doorway into this virtual world was opened to us alone by the evolution of language, because language is not merely a mode of communication, it is also the outward expression of an unusual mode of thought—symbolic representation."

== Endophoric and exophoric ==
Winfried Nöth distinguishes between endophoric and exophoric iconicity: exophoric where the signifier is iconic with the world beyond language signs, and endophoric where the signifier is iconic to another signifier within language. By endophoric he does not mean "trivial" recurrences like the letter 'e' in one sentence being iconic with the letter 'e' in another sentence, which are not iconic signs of one another according to Nöth.

Textual endophoric iconicity can be divided between intratextual and intertextual. An example of intratextual endophoric iconicity is "the various recurrences of the word icon and its derivatives iconic or iconicity....Insofar as the morpheme icon refers back to earlier of its recurrences in the text and the traces of them in our memory, it is an iconic sign. Insofar as these morphemes constitute a coherent pattern of relations which create a line of mentation, they form a diagrammatic icon". Intertextual iconicity would include things like allusions, quotations etc.

Specific utterances which adhere to the rules of a language are iconic with one another. Phonemes can also be iconic with one another in that they could both be consonants or plosives. Another example is “the relationship between great, greater, greatest….since the morphological pattern of adjective grading is the same as in loud, louder, loudest”.

== Calls and gestures ==
Iconic calls and gestures mimic the forms of the things they stand for (such as outlining shapes or moving your hands back and forth multiple times to show repetition). Iconic calls and gestures are not formally considered language or language-like communication in that they do not contrast or possess arbitrary characteristics. Noises that imitate sounds of the surrounding environment (ideophones) are also iconic. Though humans possess a repertoire of iconic calls and gestures, other mammals produce few iconic signals. Despite this, a few captive chimpanzees have shown the beginning stages of iconicity. Burling et al. states: "Chimpanzees in the wild do not point, and rarely do so in captivity, however there is a documented case of one named Kanzi, described by Savage-Rumbaugh et al., who could indicate direction of travel by "extending his hand". Another chimpanzee, Viki (Hayes and Nissen 1971:107) made motions of kneading or ironing when she wanted to knead dough or iron napkins. Bee dances are another example of iconicity in animal communication systems.

== Sign languages ==
Iconicity is often argued to play a large role in the production and perception of gesture. In sign languages iconicity was often argued to be largely confined to sign formation (comparable to onomatopoeia). Some proponents believe that iconicity does not play an actual role in perception and production of signs once they have undergone phonological reduction and become part of the conventionalized vocabulary. More recently, the possible role of iconicity is being evaluated again. Current research on sign language phonology acknowledges that certain aspects are semantically motivated. Further, the ability to modify sign meaning through phonological changes to signs is gaining attention. The ability to work creatively with sign language in this way has been associated with accomplished, or native signers.

Iconicity is expressed in the grammatical structure of sign languages called classifiers. These are used to give descriptive information about a subject or verb. In American Sign language (ASL) a grammatical marker denoting “intensity” is characterized by a movement pattern with two parts: an initial pause, followed by a quick completion. When this pattern is added to the adjective GOOD, the resulting meaning is VERY-GOOD. The ASL marker for "intensity" is iconic in that the intended meaning (building of pressure, a sudden release) is matched by the articulatory form (a pause, a quick completion).

Like in vocal languages, developmental trends in ASL shy away from iconicity in favor of arbitrariness. These changes "contribute toward symmetry, fluidity, locational displacement and assimilation". For example, the sign WE used to contain the sign for each individual being described by the WE. So the signer would sign ME + YOU1 + YOU2 + YOU n + ME. Now the sign has turned into a smooth symbolic sign where the signer makes two touches on the chest, one on each side, with a sweep of the wrist in between.

On the whole, some researchers stress that iconicity plays an important role in sign languages, while others downplay its role. The reason for this also lies in the fact that it was, for a long time, assumed that it is a major property of natural languages that there is no relation between the surface form of a word and its potential referents (thus, there is no relationship between how the word computer is pronounced and what a computer, for example, looks like, see also arbitrariness). The idea that iconicity should not play a role in natural languages was, for example, stressed by Charles Hockett. Thus, many linguists concerned with sign languages tried to downplay the role of iconicity in sign languages. It was, however, later acknowledged that iconicity also plays a role in many spoken languages (see, for example Japanese sound symbolism). Today it is often recognized that sign languages exhibit a greater degree of iconicity compared to spoken languages due to the visual natural of sign languages. However, the structure of sign languages also puts limits to the degree of iconicity: From a truly iconic language one would expect that a concept like SMILING would be expressed by mimicking a smile (i.e., by performing a smiling face). All known sign languages, however, do not express the concept of SMILING by a smiling face, but by a manual sign.

== Poetry ==
Iconicity often occurs within poetry through the use of onomatopoeia, which may be called auditory iconicity.

Sometimes the form of the poem resembles or enacts the poem's content, and in this case, a visual iconicity is present. One poet well known for his visual poems, and therefore visual iconicity, is E. E. Cummings. Another poet known for "shape poems" is George Herbert. In his poem "A Wreath" (1633) each line overlaps the next while the rhyme scheme makes a circle, thus mimicking the form of a wreath. A similar effect is seen in John Donne's “La Corona” (1607) and other Crown of sonnets cycles, in which each sonnet repeats the final line of the preceding sonnet as its first line. The first line of the first sonnet is repeated as the final line of the final sonnet, thereby closing the circle. Both Herbert’s and Donne’s poems are offered in praise to God, so their theme is iconically related to the poems’ shape.

A subset of visual iconicity involves a spatial iconicity. For instance, in Cummings's grasshopper poem ("r-p-o-p-h-e-s-s-a-g-r") the word "arriving" begins on the far right of the poem with the "a", the "r" is near the middle of the poem, and the rest of the word is on the left of the poem. The reader must travel a great distance across the poem, therefore, in order to "arrive". The spatial dimension, then, can relate to a temporal dimension. In the poems "The Fish" and "The Moose" by Elizabeth Bishop, temporal iconicity is at work. The amount of time it takes to read "The Fish" coincides with the length of time a fish could live outside of water; likewise, the duration of the long bus ride in "The Moose" coincides with the poem's long first sentence as well as the twenty-some stanzas it takes before the passengers on the bus (and the reader) actually encounters the moose.

== Language acquisition ==
It has been suggested that iconicity can be used in the teaching of languages. There are two ways this has been suggested. The first being “Horizontal-Iconicity” and the second being vowel magnitude relationships. Horizontal-Iconicity is the phenomenon of opposition of meaning and spelling. For example, in Egyptian mer, which means right hand, and rem, which means left hand. Because people are more likely to remember things they have more mnemonic tags for, it is suggested that it may be helpful to point these things out in the teaching of language.

=== Vowel magnitude ===
Vowel magnitude relationships suggest that, the larger the object, the more likely its name has open vowels such as /ɒ/, /eɪ/, and /æ/; the smaller the object, the more likely its name has closed vowel sounds such as /iː/, /ʊ/, and /juː/. Open vowel sounds are also more likely to be associated with round shapes and dark or gloomy moods, where closed vowel sounds are more likely to be associated with pointed shapes and happy moods.

A test run by Sapir asked subjects to differentiate between two different sized tables using invented word pairs such as "mal" and "mil". He discovered a word containing [a] was at four times more likely to be judged as larger if paired with a word containing [i]. Nuckolls states: "Newman discovered that ... as the tongue recedes in articulating vowels from the front to the back of the mouth, and as acoustic frequencies become lower, the vowels are judged to be larger and darker". Bentley and Varron (1933) ran tests asking subjects to differentiate between vowel sounds without providing them, beforehand, contrasting attributes (such as bright and dark.) They found only moderate success rates that decreased when vowel sounds were closer in tone. However, they still found that [a] sounds were judged larger or lower than [i] sounds.

In morphology, examples from degree adjectives, such as long, longer, longest, show that the most extreme degree of length is iconically represented by the word with the greatest number of phonemes. Jakobson cites examples of word order mimicking the natural order of ideas. In fact, iconicity is now widely acknowledged to be a significant factor at many levels of linguistic structure.

== See also ==
- Autonomy of syntax
- Charles Sanders Peirce
- Cratylus
- Gematria
- Semiotic theory of Charles Sanders Peirce
- Semiotics
- Sign
- Sign relation
- Triadic relation

== Bibliography ==
- Bross, F. (2024). "What is iconicity?". Sign Language & Linguistics. 27 (1): 73–102. doi:10.1075/sll.22003.bro.
- Croft, L. B. (1978). "The Mnemonic Use of Linguistic Iconicity in Teaching Language and Literature". The Slavic and East European Journal. 22 (4): 509–518. doi:10.2307/307673. JSTOR 307673.
- Davis, Marc (1995). "Media Streams: An Iconic Visual Language for Video Representation" (PDF). In Baecker, Ronald M.; Grudin, Jonathan; Buxton, William A. S.; Greenberg, Saul (eds.). Readings in Human–Computer Interaction: Toward the Year 2000. Interactive Technologies (2nd ed.). San Francisco: Morgan Kaufmann Publishers. pp. 854–866. doi:10.1016/B978-0-08-051574-8.50089-3. ISBN 978-1-55860-246-5. LCCN 95-12073. OCLC 5706745444.
- Frishberg, N. (1975). "Arbitrariness and Iconicity: Historical Change in America". Language. 51 (3): 696–719. doi:10.2307/412894. JSTOR 412894.
- Haiman, John (1980). "The Iconicity of Grammar: Isomorphism and Motivation". Language. 56 (3): 515–540. doi:10.2307/414448. JSTOR 414448.
- Haiman, John (1983). "Iconic and Economic Motivation". Language. 59 (4): 781–819. doi:10.2307/413373. JSTOR 413373.
- Hinton, L., Nichols, J., and Ohala, J.J. (1994). Sound Symbolism. Cambridge: Cambridge University Press.
- Moravcsik, Edith, A. 1978. Reduplicative constructions. In Universals of human language, vol. 3: Word structure, Joseph H. Greenberg, ed., 297–334. Stanford: Stanford University Press.
- Shapiro, Bruce G. 1999. Reinventing Drama: Acting, Iconicity, Performance. Greenwood Press.
- Wilcox, S (2004). "Conceptual spaces and embodied actions: Cognitive iconicity and signed languages". Cognitive Linguistics. 15 (2): 119–147. doi:10.1515/cogl.2004.005.
