= Sign name =

Sign used to identify a person

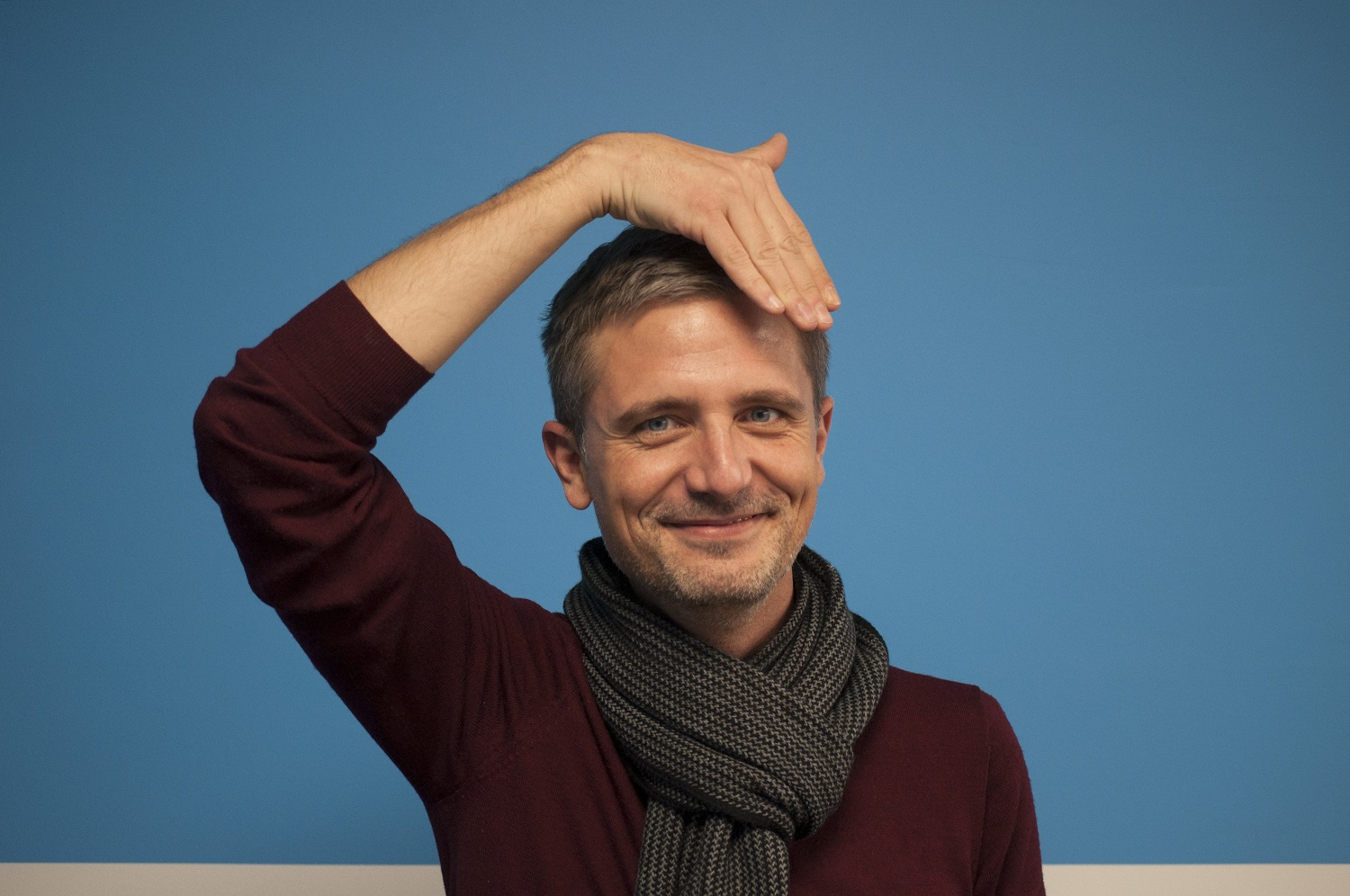
Donald Trump's sign name, elected sign of the year 2016 by the Swiss Federation of the Deaf

In Deaf culture and sign language, a sign name (or a name sign) is a special sign that is used to uniquely identify a person (a name).

== American Sign Language ==
In the American deaf community and American Sign Language (ASL), there are cultural norms regarding ASL name signs; for example, they must be agreed upon by the named person and the broader deaf community. This ensures that no one else in the community already has the same sign name or that the same sign has a different meaning. Until a person receives a sign name, the person's name is usually fingerspelled, rendering a letter-by-letter representation of a person's English-language name.

Linguist Samuel James Supalla identifies name signs as having dual functions: to identify persons and to signify "membership in the Deaf community." Different deaf cultures have different customs around sign names. For example, in the deaf American community, sign names are usually subdivided into two naming systems: descriptive (DNS) and arbitrary (ANS). Descriptive names manually illustrate descriptions of the person (for example, personality or physical appearance) and are conveyed through classifier handshapes, and an arbitrary name sign corresponds to initials (or to the first letter of a spoken name) applied to one or more locations. A third category, nontraditional name signs, combine elements of the arbitrary and descriptive. An ANS sign is usually just a unique sign without other meaning, but there may be family patterns, like all the children in a family having names signed at the chin. Name signs may change over the course of a user's life.

While name signs were originally exclusive to deaf people, some hearing people who use ASL and interact with the deaf community also have name signs. Prominent individuals with no direct connection to deaf culture are sometimes also assigned name signs; for example, George Washington, Abraham Lincoln, William Shakespeare, and Vincent van Gogh all have name signs. Contemporary non-deaf figures, such as elected officials, are sometimes also given name signs. For example, after becoming Vice President-elect of the United States, Kamala Harris was assigned a name sign consisting of a rotation of the wrist completed concurrently with the unfurling of the thumb, index and middle finger; the sign was partly derived from the sign for lotus flower (which is what "Kamala" means in Sanskrit) and from the number three (representing Harris as the first vice president to be a woman, African American, and Asian American).
