= Eleanor Saffran =

American psychologist

Eleanor M. Saffran (May 16, 1938 – November 23, 2002) was an American neuroscientist and researcher in the field of Cognitive Neuropsychology. Her interest in Neuropsychology began at the Baltimore City hospitals of Johns Hopkins University, where her research unit focused on neurological patients with language or cognitive impairments. In papers published between 1976 and 1982, Dr. Saffran spelled out the methodological tenets of “cognitive neuropsychology” exemplified in her studies of aphasia, alexia (acquired dyslexia), auditory verbal agnosia, and short-term memory impairment.

== Career ==
In 1980, Saffran joined the Neurology Department of Temple University and established the Center for Cognitive Neuroscience. Here she built an interdisciplinary research group composed of neurologists, psychologists, and speech-language pathologists. Under her leadership, this group extended the cognitive neuropsychological approach to the analysis of neurological disorders of perception, visual attention, and semantics.

These years also marked the continuation of her longstanding collaboration with Myrna Schwartz of MossRehab (part of the Einstein Healthcare Network) which began in Baltimore in 1975. An innovative aspect of their research was its emphasis on application of language theory to diagnosis and treatment of language disorders. This model was embraced by other researchers of language and remains a standard approach in aphasia research today. As the field of cognitive neuropsychology matured, Saffran became recognized as one of its most influential practitioners. In 1989, her grant on the psycholinguistic analysis of language disorders was awarded the Claude Pepper Award of Excellence by the National Institute on Deafness and Communication Disorders.

In 1991, Saffran was appointed as professor in the Department of Communication Sciences and Disorders at Temple University. She continued teaching her courses even after progression of a degenerative condition had weakened her speaking voice and use of her hands. Her contributions to research were recognized posthumously when she was awarded the Temple University Faculty Research Award for excellence in research in 2003.

== Legacy ==
Longtime colleague Nadine Martin, associate professor of communication sciences and disorders at Temple University, started working with Saffran in 1982 and then completed her Ph.D. in Cognitive Psychology at Temple University in 1987. Nadine Martin is the founder and director of the Eleanor M. Saffran Center for Cognitive Neuroscience, established in 2006 and named after Eleanor Saffran

Her daughter Jenny Saffran has also pursued a career in research in cognitive science. She leads the Infant Learning Laboratory at University of Wisconsin–Madison.

== List of important papers ==
- Saffran EM, Marin OS, Yeni-Komshian GH. (1976) An analysis of speech perception in word deafness. Brain and Language, 3:209-28.
- Saffran EM, Schwartz MF, Marin OS. (1980) The word order problem in agrammatism. II. Production. Brain and Language, 10:263-80.
- Saffran EM, Schwartz MF, Marin OS. (1980) The word order problem in agrammatism. I. Comprehension. Brain and Language, 10:249-62.
- Linebarger MC, Schwartz MF, Saffran EM. (1983) Sensitivity to grammatical structure in so-called agrammatic aphasics. Cognition, 13:361-92.
- Saffran EM, Berndt RS, Schwartz MF. (1989) The quantitative analysis of agrammatic production: procedure and data. Brain and Language. 37:440-79.
- Saffran EM, Schwartz MF. (1994) Impairment of sentence comprehension. Philosophical Transactions of the Royal Society of London. Series B, Biological Sciences, 346:47-53.
- Dell GS, Schwartz MF, Martin N, Saffran EM, Gagnon DA. (1997) Lexical access in aphasic and nonaphasic speakers. Psychological Review, 104:801-38.
- Martin N, Saffran EM. (1997) Language and auditory-verbal short-term memory impairments: Evidence for common underlying processes. Cognitive Neuropsychology, 14:641–682.
- Saffran EM, Schwartz MF, Linebarger MC. (1998) Semantic influences on thematic role assignment: evidence from normals and aphasics. Brain and Language, 62:255-97.
- Saffran EM. (2000) The organization of semantic memory: in support of a distributed model. Brain and Language, 71:204-12.
