= Jenny Saffran =

American cognitive psychologist (born 1964)

- Education: Brown University; University of Rochester
- Known for: Research on infant statistical learning
- Spouse: Seth Pollak (m. 1998)
- Children: 2
- Awards: Presidential Early Career Award for Scientists and Engineers (2000); Jeffrey L. Elman Prize (2020)
- Scientific career
- Fields: Cognitive Science
- Workplaces: University of Wisconsin–Madison
- Website: www.waisman.wisc.edu/staff/saffran-jenny/

Jenny R. Saffran (born 1964) is a cognitive psychologist known for her research on language acquisition, statistical learning, music cognition, and cognitive development. She is a Distinguished Professor of Psychology at the University of Wisconsin–Madison and affiliated with the university's Waisman Center, where she directs the Infant Learning Lab.

== Awards and honors ==
- 2000 – Presidential Early Career Award for Scientists and Engineers, awarded for contributions to understanding cognitive processes involved in language acquisition
- 2002 – Boyd McCandless Young Scientist Award, American Psychological Association, Division 7
- 2004 – Distinguished Scientific Award for Early Career Contribution to Psychology, American Psychological Association, in the area of cognition and human learning.
- 2006 – Named Distinguished Professor of Psychology, University of Wisconsin–Madison
- 2010 – Robert L. Fantz Memorial Award for Young Psychologists from the American Psychological Foundation
- 2015 – Elected member of the American Academy of Arts and Sciences
- 2016 – Kellett Mid-Career Award, University of Wisconsin–Madison
- 2018 – Vilas Distinguished Achievement Professorship University of Wisconsin–Madison
- 2019 – Inaugural Jeffrey L. Elman Prize for Scientific Achievement and Community Building, Cognitive Science Society
- 2025 – Distinguished Honors Faculty Award, University of Wisconsin–Madison College of Letters & Science
- 2026 – Faculty Award for Excellence in Graduate Student Mentoring, University of Wisconsin–Madison

== Education and career ==
Saffran grew up in an academic family as the daughter of two professors. Her mother, Eleanor Saffran, was a prominent cognitive neuropsychologist and researcher. Scientific and academic discussions were a regular part of dinner table conversations, and Saffran even had a communicative chimpanzee poster in her bedroom. Early exposure to psychology led to become involved in psychological research while she was still in high school, following developmental psychologist Deborah Kemler Nelson.

Saffran went on to study cognitive science at Brown University, where she received her bachelor's degree in 1991. She then attended graduate school at the University of Rochester where she obtained her Ph.D. in Brain and Cognitive Sciences in 1997. Saffran's graduate advisors were Elissa L. Newport and Richard N. Aslin. Using statistical regularities between syllables, Saffran's doctoral research investigated how learners identify word boundaries in continuous speech.

Saffran joined the faculty of the Department of Psychology at the University of Wisconsin–Madison in 1997. She was named a Distinguished Professor of Psychology in 2006, and was awarded the Vilas Distinguished Achievement Professorship in 2018.

== Personal life ==
Saffran is married to fellow psychologist Seth Pollak in 1998. They have two children.

== Research ==
Saffran's research focuses on language acquisition, statistical learning, and cognitive development, examining how children learn from patterns in language, music, and their environments. Her studies of early language acquisition have shown that infants can detect statistical relationships between syllables to identify word boundaries in continuous speech. Her work on musical tones further suggests that statistical learning extends beyond language, with developmental differences in auditory pattern recognition.

Saffran has also investigated how background noise, environmental predictability, and physical context influence children's word learning. Her studies have found that competing speech can interfere with vocabulary acquisition, while predictable events and contextual cues can facilitate learning. Saffran's research has also examined individual differences in language processing, including how autistic toddlers respond to changes in the predictability of linguistic input.

== Representative publications ==
- Saffran, J. R. (2003). Statistical language learning: Mechanisms and constraints. Current Directions in Psychological Science, 12(4), 110-114. https://doi.org/10.1111/1467-8721.01243
- Saffran, J. R., Aslin, R. N., & Newport, E. L. (1996). Statistical learning by 8-month-old infants. Science, 274(5294), 1926-1928. https://doi.org/10.1126/science.274.5294.1926
- Saffran, J. R., Johnson, E. K., Aslin, R. N., & Newport, E. L. (1999). Statistical learning of tone sequences by human infants and adults. Cognition, 70(1), 27-52. https://doi.org/10.1016/S0010-0277(98)00075-4
- Saffran, J. R., Newport, E. L., & Aslin, R. N. (1996). Word segmentation: The role of distributional cues. Journal of Memory and Language, 35(4), 606-621. https://doi.org/10.1006/jmla.1996.0032
- Saffran, J. R., & Thiessen, E. D. (2003). Pattern induction by infant language learners. Developmental Psychology, 39(3), 484–494. https://doi.org/10.1037/0012-1649.39.3.484
