= Richard N. Aslin =

American psychologist (born 1949)

- Born: August 9, 1949 (age 77); Milwaukee, Wisconsin, U.S.
- Education: Michigan State University, University of Minnesota
- Scientific career
- Fields: Developmental psychology
- Workplaces: Haskins Laboratories, University of Rochester

Richard Norman Aslin (born August 9, 1949) is an American psychologist. He is currently a senior scientist at Haskins Laboratories and professor at Yale University. Until December, 2016, Dr. Aslin was William R. Kenan Professor of Brain & Cognitive Sciences and Center for Visual Sciences at the University of Rochester. During his time in Rochester, he was also director of the Rochester Center for Brain Imaging and the Rochester Baby Lab. He had worked at the university for over thirty years, until he resigned in protest of the university's handling of a sexual harassment complaint about a junior member of his department.

His research covers many areas, but the bulk of it concerns statistical learning, visual perception, speech perception, language development, and visual development. A great deal of his work focuses on understanding how higher-level cognitive representations and structures are constructed from lower-level sensory input statistics, including how acoustic variation in speech to infants yields phonologically distinct speech sound categories in adults.

== Biography ==
Born in Milwaukee, Wisconsin, he graduated from Michigan State University with a Bachelor of Arts with High Honors in Psychology, in 1971.

Aslin received his Ph.D. in child psychology from the University of Minnesota in 1975 at the Institute of Child Development. His advisor was Philip Salapatek. He was a faculty member in the Department of Psychology at the Indiana University and a visiting researcher at the University of Washington and the University of Minnesota before joining the faculty at the University of Rochester. He is also the current president of the International Society for Infant Studies.

In 2017, Aslin and eight other plaintiffs filed a federal lawsuit against the University of Rochester for its handling of a sexual misconduct complaint. In 2020, the university settled the case for $9.4 million without any admission of wrongdoing, but issued a statement thanking the plaintiffs for their efforts.

He has a wife and two sons. His son Tim is an actor.

== Research interests ==
Aslin studies infant perception and language development using eye tracking and neuroimaging methods. Some of his early work concerned how infants learn the speech categories of their native language based on the noisy input of speech around them. He also studied how this process of forming speech categories interacts with word learning in young pre-verbal infants. Later work, with collaborators Jenny Saffran and Elissa L. Newport addressed how infants segment words from continuous speech by tracking the co-occurrence statistics of the syllables. This research yielded many publications that are considered classics in the statistical learning literature, including a 1996 Science article, "Statistical Learning in 8-Month-Old Infants". Some of his recent work has extended original findings about infants' ability to track environmental statistics in speech to the visual world. Recently he has studied how infants use statistics of the visual world in order to infer properties about the structure of objects in the world. He has also recently conducted research investigating how infants allocate their attention in the visual world.

He has collaborated on studies of adults' spoken word recognition, speech perception, and word learning with Michael Tanenhaus.

== Recognition ==
Aslin has been recognized by a number of organizations for his theoretical and empirical contributions to the fields of cognitive science and developmental psychology. He was awarded an Honorary Doctorate at Uppsala University in 2010, the Robert and Pamela Goergen Award for Distinguished Contributions to Undergraduate Learning in 2001, and a Guggenheim Fellowship in 1988. He also received numerous early career development awards, including ones from the National Institute of Child Health and Human Development, the National Institute of Mental Health, the American Psychological Association, and the National Science Foundation. He was named a fellow of the Center for Advanced Study in Behavioral Sciences at Stanford University and the American Association for the Advancement of Science. In 2006, he was elected a Fellow of the American Academy of Arts and Sciences, and in 2014, he was inducted into the National Academy of Sciences In 2023, he was awarded the Kurt Koffka Medal for "advancing the fields of perception or developmental psychology to an extraordinary extent".
