= Marc Davis (academic) =

- Website: marcdavis.me

Marc Davis was founding director of Yahoo! Research Berkeley, and led Garage Cinema Research.

Davis received his bachelor's degree in 1984 from Wesleyan University, his master's degree in literary science and philosophy from University of Konstanz in 1987 and his PhD from the Massachusetts Institute of Technology in 1995.

Davis was also chief technology officer and co-founder of Amova from 1999 to 2002.

He served as the social media guru at Yahoo! Inc. and as chief scientist and co-founder of Invention Arts. Davis is currently a partner architect for Microsoft's Online Services Division.
