= Nancy Frishberg =

American linguist

Nancy Frishberg (born 1948) is an American linguist, researcher, and user-experience specialist known for her work on sign language linguistics and sign language interpreting. She is the author of Interpreting: An Introduction, a textbook that has been widely used in interpreter training programs.

== Education ==
Frishberg studied linguistics and earned an AB with honors from the University of California, Berkeley and an MA and PhD from the University of California, San Diego.

== Career ==
Frishberg's early career was in the academia, where her research focused on the sign languages used by deaf communities. Her work contributed to the development of the linguistic and sociolinguistic study of sign languages and to the professionalization of sign language interpreting. One of her major innovations is the introduction of the concept of classifier constructions in sign languages.

She has also worked as a practicing freelance interpreter since the early 1970s and as a consultant in sign language and interpreting.

Frishberg later moved into the technology sector, working as a linguist and usability specialist in industry beginning in the mid-1980s. She has held positions at technology companies including IBM, Apple, and Sun Microsystems, applying linguistic knowledge and cognitive research to user-interface design and digital systems. Her work has included research and consulting in human–computer interaction, usability, and user-experience design across sectors such as education, digital media, financial services, and health.

== Publications ==
Frishberg is the author of Interpreting: An Introduction, first published by the Registry of Interpreters for the deaf in the 1980s and later issued in revised editions. The book covers the history, terminology, skills, and ethical principles of sign language interpreting and has been widely used in interpreter education.

She also contributed multiple articles to the Gallaudet Encyclopedia of Deaf People and Deafness.

== Bibliography ==
- Frishberg, Nancy (2015). Interpreting: an Introduction (Revised edition, 1990 (reformatted for reprinting, 2015) ed.). Silver Spring: RID Publications. ISBN 978-0-916883-07-2.
