= Elissa L. Newport =

American psycholinguist

Elissa Lee Newport
- Born: c. 1947 (age 78–79)
- Education: Barnard College, University of Pennsylvania
- Spouse: Ted Supalla
- Awards: Benjamin Franklin Medal for Computer and Cognitive Sciences, 2015
- Scientific career
- Fields: Language acquisition & developmental linguistics
- Workplaces: University of California, San Diego, University of Illinois, University of Rochester, Georgetown University

External videos
- "Elissa L. Newport, Ph.D. - 2015 Benjamin Franklin Medal in Computer and Cognitive Science", The Franklin Institute

Elissa Lee Newport is a professor of neurology and director of the Center for Brain Plasticity and Recovery at Georgetown University. She specializes in language acquisition and developmental psycholinguistics, focusing on the relationship between language development and language structure, and most recently on the effects of pediatric stroke on the organization and recovery of language.

== Biography ==
Newport graduated from Ladue Horton Watkins High School in Ladue, Missouri in 1965. Newport attended Wellesley College from 1965 to 1967 and in 1969 graduated from Barnard College of Columbia University. Newport received a Ph.D. from the University of Pennsylvania in 1975, where her advisors were Lila Gleitman and Henry Gleitman.

She was a member of the faculty in the department of psychology at the University of California, San Diego and the University of Illinois before joining the faculty at the University of Rochester, where she was chair of the department and the George Eastman Professor of Brain and Cognitive Sciences. In July 2012, she joined the faculty at Georgetown University where she became the founding director of the newly established Center for Brain Plasticity and Recovery. Dr. Newport is married to Ted Supalla, who is also a professor in the department of neurology at Georgetown University.

In 2017, Newport and eight other plaintiffs filed a lawsuit against the University of Rochester for its handling of sexual misconduct complaints against another professor. In 2020, the university settled the case for $9.4 million.

== Research interests ==
Newport studies both normal acquisition and creolization using miniature languages presented to learners in the lab, where both the input and the structure of the language can be controlled, to see how the learning process actually works. A second line of research concerns maturational effects on language learning, comparing children to adults as first and second language learners, and asking why children, who are more limited in most cognitive domains, perform better than adults in language acquisition. She also conducts studies of human learners acquiring musical and other nonlinguistic patterns, and of nonhuman primates attempting to learn the same materials, to see where sequential learning, and the constraints on such learning, differ across species and domains. A long-term interest concerns understanding why languages universally display certain types of structures, and considers whether constraints on pattern learning in children may provide part of the basis for universal regularities in languages of the world. Her most recent work investigates language and the brain, using MRI to examine how sign and oral languages are represented in the brain and how language is reorganized after damage or disease.

=== Statistical Learning ===
With Richard N. Aslin and Jenny Saffran, Newport introduced statistical learning to the study of natural language acquisition: the hypothesis that infants, young children, and adults acquire the structure of languages by computing the statistics of the co-occurrence of elements - which elements of the sound stream occur most frequently, and which elements occur consistently together or predictively - and using these statistics to find the words, phrases, and sentence structures of their languages. They suggested that this process is implicit (therefore related to the more general notion of implicit learning) and can be done rapidly and online during language listening. Newport and Aslin have gone on from their initial study of word segmentation to reveal the statistical computations done by children and adults in forming word categories, verb argument structure and phrase structure and also have shown that this type of computation is not unique to language but appears to be a widespread computational ability that appears in other modalities and domains as well.

=== Less is More Hypothesis ===
One of Newport's most well-known contributions to the field of language acquisition research is the Less is More Hypothesis. In this hypothesis, Newport posits that children are better able to learn languages than adults because they have fewer cognitive resources available to them. This is advantageous in learning a complex combinatorial system such as a human language because children, given their cognitive limitations, will naturally proceed by beginning with small parts and will acquire more complex constructions only as they mature. In contrast, more competent adults will begin by trying to analyze more complexity from the start and will have difficulty finding the best analyses. In her natural language studies she has shown that learners who begin in childhood show much greater ultimate proficiency in both first and second languages than those who begin in adulthood. In her miniature language studies she has shown that children and adults differ in language learning in well controlled studies in the lab, with young children acquiring regular patterns and rules even when their input is inconsistent. This regularization process provides an explanation of how children may contribute to the formation of languages over generations.

== Awards and honors ==
Newport has been recognized by a number of organizations for the impact of her theoretical and empirical contributions to the field of language acquisition. She has been elected as a fellow in the American Philosophical Society, the Association for Psychological Science, the Society of Experimental Psychologists, the Cognitive Science Society, the American Association for the Advancement of Science, the American Academy of Arts and Sciences, and the National Academy of Sciences. Her research has been supported by grants from the National Institutes of Health (NIH), the National Science Foundation, the James S. McDonnell Foundation, and the Packard Foundation.

In 2015, she was awarded the Benjamin Franklin Medal for Computer and Cognitive Sciences. She had previously received the Claude Pepper Award of Excellence from the NIH, and the William James Lifetime Achievement Award for Basic Research, the highest honor given by the Association for Psychological Science (APS).
