= Ted Supalla =

American linguist and sign language researcher

Ted Supalla is a deaf linguist whose research centers on sign language in its developmental and global context, including studies of the grammatical structure and evolution of American Sign Language and other sign languages.

Previously at the University of Illinois at Urbana–Champaign and the University of Rochester in New York, Supalla is a professor in the Department of Neurology at Georgetown University.

== Biography ==
Ted Supalla was born deaf, into a deaf family, including his younger brother Sam. Ted's father would often go to the Deaf Club, bringing the whole family.

He is married to Elissa L. Newport, also a professor in the Department of Neurology at Georgetown University.

== Education ==
- Portland State University Psychology
- California State University at Northridge Psychology B.A., 1973
- University of Nevada, Reno Psychology
- University of California, San Diego Psychology M.A., 1975, Ph.D., 1982

== Research ==
Supalla co-authored with Elissa Newport the first work on the use of movement changes to derive nouns from verbs in American Sign Language. He also produced the seminal work on the structure of classifier constructions and verbs of motion and location. He has published a book and several journal articles on the history of American Sign Language and the processes of linguistic change that introduce new grammatical forms into a sign language over its history. In all of these works, his overarching claim is that the structure of sign languages is quite parallel to that of spoken languages, in complexity and in the processes that introduce grammatical complexities into the language. His recent work focuses on the structure of quite different sign language typologies, comparing American Sign Language and its family of French-derived sign languages with the quite different family of sign languages in Japan and other parts of Asia.

== Selected publications ==
- Supalla, Ted and Clark, P. 2015. Sign Language Archeology: Understanding History and Evolution of American Sign Language. Washington, D.C.: Gallaudet University Press.
- Supalla, Ted. In press. Film and Deaf Culture. San Diego, CA: Dawn Sign Press.
- Koo, D. & Supalla, Ted. In press. "Nativization of bi-modal co-articulation in Cued Speech: Phonological Representations and Processes in Deaf Cuers," In C. LaSasso & J. Kelly (eds.), Cued Speech and Cued Language Development of Deaf Students. Washington, D.C.: Gallaudet University Press.
- Supalla, Ted, Clark, P., Neumann Solow, S., & Quadros Mueller, R. In press. "A protocol for interpreter coordination at international conferences." In R. McKee & J. Davis (eds.), Studies in Interpretation Series, Volume 5. Washington, D.C.: Gallaudet University Press.
- Bavelier, D., Newport, Elissa L., Hall, M., Supalla, Ted, & Boutla, M. 2008. "Ordered short-term memory differs in signers and speakers: Implications for models of short-term memory." Cognition, 107, 433–459.
- Supalla, Ted. 2008. "Sign Language Archeology: Integrating Historical Linguistics with Fieldwork on Young Sign Languages." In R. M. de Quadros (ed.), Sign Languages: Spinning and Unraveling the Past, Present and Future. Proceedings of the Ninth International Conference on Theoretical Issues in Sign Language Research. Florianopolis, Brazil, December 2006. Petropolis, Brazil: Editora Arara Azul.
- Hauser, P.C., Paludenviciene, R., Supalla, Ted., & Bavelier, D. 2008. "ASL-Sentence Reproduction Test: Development and Implications." In R. M. de Quadros (ed.), Sign Languages: Spinning and Unraveling the Past, Present and Future. Proceedings of the Ninth International Conference on Theoretical Issues in Sign Language Research. Florianopolis, Brazil, December 2006. Petropolis, Brazil: Editora Arara Azul.
- Supalla, Ted. 2008. Prologue for WFD Sign Lexicon. Spanish Association of the Deaf.
- Bavelier, D., Newport, Elissa L., Hall, M., Supalla, Ted, & Boutla, M. 2006. "Persistent differences in short-term memory span between sign and speech: Implications for cross-linguistic comparisons." Psychological Science, 17, 1090–1092.
- Boutla, M., Supalla, Ted, Newport, Elissa L., & Bavelier, D. 2004. "Short-term memory span: insights from sign language." Nature Neuroscience, 7, 997–1002.
- Supalla, Ted. 2004. "The validity of the Gallaudet Lecture Films." Sign Language Studies, 4, 261–292.
- Bavelier, D., Newport, Elissa L., & Supalla, Ted. 2003. "Children need natural languages, signed or spoken." Cerebrum, 5, 19–32.
- Supalla, Ted. 2003. "Revisiting visual analogy in ASL classifier predicates." In K. Emmorey (ed.), Perspectives on Classifier Constructions in Sign Language. Mahwah N.J.: Lawrence Erlbaum Assoc.
- Supalla, Ted. 2002. "Making historical sign language materials accessible: A prototype database of early ASL." Sign Language & Linguistics, 4, 285–297.
- Newport, Elissa L., & Supalla, Ted. 2000. "Sign language research at the millennium." In K. Emmorey and H. Lane (Eds.), The Signs of Language Revisited: An Anthology in Honor of Ursula Bellugi and Edward Klima. Mahwah, NJ: Lawrence Erlbaum Associates.
- Newport, Elissa L., & Supalla, Ted. 1999. "Sign languages." In R. Wilson and F. Keil (Eds.), The MIT Encyclopedia of the Cognitive Sciences. Cambridge, MA: MIT Press.
- Osugi, Y., Supalla, Ted., & Webb, R. 1999. "The use of word elicitation to identify distinctive gestural systems on Amami Island." Sign Language & Linguistics, 2, 87–112.
- Senghas, Ann, Coppola, M., Newport, Elissa L., & Supalla, Ted. 1997. "Argument structure in Nicaraguan Sign Language: The emergence of grammatical devices." In E. Hughes, M. Hughes, and A. Greenhill (Eds.), Proceedings of the 21st Annual Boston University Conference on Language Development: Vol.2. Somerville, MA: Cascadilla Press.
- Metlay, D. & Supalla, Ted. 1995. "Morpho-syntactic structure of aspect and number inflections in ASL." In K. Emmorey and J. Reilly (Eds.), Sign, Gesture and Space. Mahwah, NJ: Lawrence Erlbaum.
- Supalla, Ted, & Webb, R. 1995. "The grammar of International Sign: A new look at pidgin languages." In K. Emmorey and J. Reilly (Eds.), Sign, Gesture and Space. Mahwah, NJ: Lawrence Erlbaum.
- Supalla, Ted. 1994. Charles Krauel: A Profile of a Deaf Filmmaker. 30 min., VHS, Color/b&w. Documentary videotape. San Diego, CA: DawnSign Pictures.
- Supalla, Ted. 1991. "Deaf folklife film collection project." Sign Language Studies, 70, 73–82.
- Supalla, Ted. 1990. "Serial verbs of motion in American Sign Language." In S. Fischer (Ed.), Theoretical Issues in Sign Language Research. University of Chicago Press.
- Supalla, T. 1986. "The classifier system in American Sign Language." In C. Craig (Ed.), Noun Classification and Categorization. J. Benjamins.
- Supalla, Ted. 1982. Structure and acquisition of verbs of motion and location in American Sign Language. Ph.D. dissertation, University of California, San Diego.
- Supalla, T., & Newport, E. 1978. "How many seats in a chair? The derivation of nouns and verbs in American Sign Language." In P. Siple (Ed.), Understanding Language through Sign Language Research. Academic Press.
