= Samuel James Supalla =

American musician (born 1957)

- Born: December 4, 1957 (age 68); Pasco, Washington

Samuel James Supalla (December 4, 1957) is an American Sign Language performer, filmmaker, and linguist. He developed the ASL-phabet, and is noted for his storytelling performances in American Sign Language.

== Early life ==
Supalla was born in Pasco, Washington on December 4, 1957. Both of his parents and two of his three brothers were deaf, and his third brother was hard of hearing. Supalla's brother Ted helped with the creation of Supalla's name sign, which Samuel did not have until three weeks after his birth. Supalla later said: "I really think of myself as being born around December 23rd with the help of my brother, Ted!" At a very young age, he began appointing name signs for others. He is a filmmaker and a linguist “whose interest lies in the research and English development issues concerning deaf children” and stresses the importance of a natural sign language.

Before enrolling in school, Samuel's father would often go to the Deaf Club bringing the whole family along to attend. Samuel himself remembers the old stories and plays that were performed in ASL. The audience at the Club shared a fascination for these ASL stories. He graduated from the Oregon School for the Deaf. Throughout preschool and elementary, the program enforced oralism amongst deaf students where signing was not allowed. Although the children were not allowed to sign, they would do so in their dormitories. “I had become a signing model for my peers during the early formative years. When Supalla went home, he made up stories about an imaginary white horse, and when he returned to school, he told his classmates. When the students visited his home, “they would ask where the white horse was. I would have to lie and tell them that the white horse died. They were disappointed that they never got to see the white horse”.

When Supalla was 15, the Oregon School for the Deaf was invited by Gallaudet University to the National Association of the Deaf. There was a talent competition in front of an audience of Gallaudet students. Supalla won the competition.

== Education and career beginnings ==
Supalla enrolled at California State University Northridge in 1976 and graduated as a History major. While he was a student, he was invited to give a storytelling performance at a conference on American Sign Language research, which started his professional public speaking career.

He worked as a research assistant at the Salk Institute for Biological Studies in San Diego. In 1982, he began graduate studies in education with a concentration in bilingual education at the University of Illinois at Urbana-Champaign, earning a master's degree and doctorate degree.

== Career ==
In 1989, Supalla moved to Tucson, Arizona, to work at the University of Arizona. His focus is on disability and psychoeducational studies, and literacy issues among deaf children, who may need to develop a 'mother tongue' like ASL in order to learn a second language such as English.

Supalla's The Book Of Names Signs was published 1992. It describes the origins of American Sign Language name signing.

ASL-phabet is a system designed by Supalla. It is the American Sign Language dictionary for kids which consists of over 300 sign words that include symbols such as Handshape, Location, and Movement. It is a “primary source of English for deaf learners“.

Supalla contributed to A Free Hand: Enfranchising the Education of Deaf Children. His part discusses "the policy analysis on the notion of reverse mainstreaming and the redefinition of bilingual education for deaf children that is forthcoming."
