= Sepp =

Sepp may refer to:

- Sepp (given name)
- Sepp (surname)
- Science & Environmental Policy Project
- Sepp (publisher)
- Substantially equal periodic payments, US tax-law provision
- Single Edge Processor Package
- State Enterprise for Pesticide Production, a cover name for Muthana State Establishment, an Iraqi chemical weapons facility
- Snail extinction prevention program(SEPP)

== See also ==
- Seppe (disambiguation)
- SEP (disambiguation)
