= SEP =

Sep or SEP may refer to:

== Abbreviations ==
- Sep., a common abbreviation for September
- Septentrional (borrowed from Latin meaning northern, or pertaining to the north)

== Military ==
- ORP Sęp (1938), a Polish Navy submarine until 1972
- ORP Sęp (2002), a Polish Navy submarine
- Splitterskyddad EnhetsPlattform, a Swedish armoured fighting vehicle
- Special Intelligence Patrols, a Danish Long Range Reconnaissance Patrol unit from 1959 to 1994
- Systems Enhancement Package, a modernization program for the M1A2 Abrams
- Surrendered Enemy Personnel

== People ==
- Sep (given name)
- Hrvoje Sep (born 1986), Croatian boxer

== Politics and government ==
- Secretariat of Public Education (Mexico) (Secretaría de Educación Pública)
- Specialna Enota Policije, a Slovenian National Police unit
- SEP law, Chile
- Socialist Equality Party
- Samajik Ekta Party, Haryana, India

== Science and technology ==
- Polyestriol phosphate, an estrogen medication
- Signaling End Point, in telecommunications switching
- Solar Electric Propulsion, of a spacecraft
- Solar energetic particles
- Somatosensory evoked potential, brain activity from touch
- Stanford Exploration Project, for seismic imaging of the Earth
- Standard electrode potential
- Strong equivalence principle, in General Relativity physics
- IS-1 Sęp, a 1947 Polish glider
- Somatic Experiencing Practitioner, a title used in a form of alternative psychotherapy
- sORF-encoded protein (SEP), also known as microprotein
- Specific excess power (SEP), aerodynamic concept used in calculating the flight envelope

== Other uses ==
- Stanford Encyclopedia of Philosophy
- SEP-IRA, a US pension
- Sęp, Świętokrzyskie Voivodeship, a village in Poland
- SEP Burundi (Société d'Entreposage Pétrolier au Burundi), an oil storage company
- Somebody else's problem
- Standard-essential patent, for an invention needed to meet a standard
- Syringe exchange program or needle exchange
- Summer Enrichment Program (University of Colorado), for gifted children
- Society for European Philosophy, an academic society for the study of Continental philosophy

== See also ==
- Seppe (disambiguation)
- Sepp (disambiguation)
- Sept (disambiguation)
- Cep (disambiguation)
