= Audactus =

Audactus may refer to either:

- St Audactus (d. AD 303), the companion in martyrdom of St Felix of Thibiuca
- St Adauctus, the legendary companion in martyrdom of a different St Felix supposedly also murdered in 303
