= Spanish illumination of the Early Middle Ages =

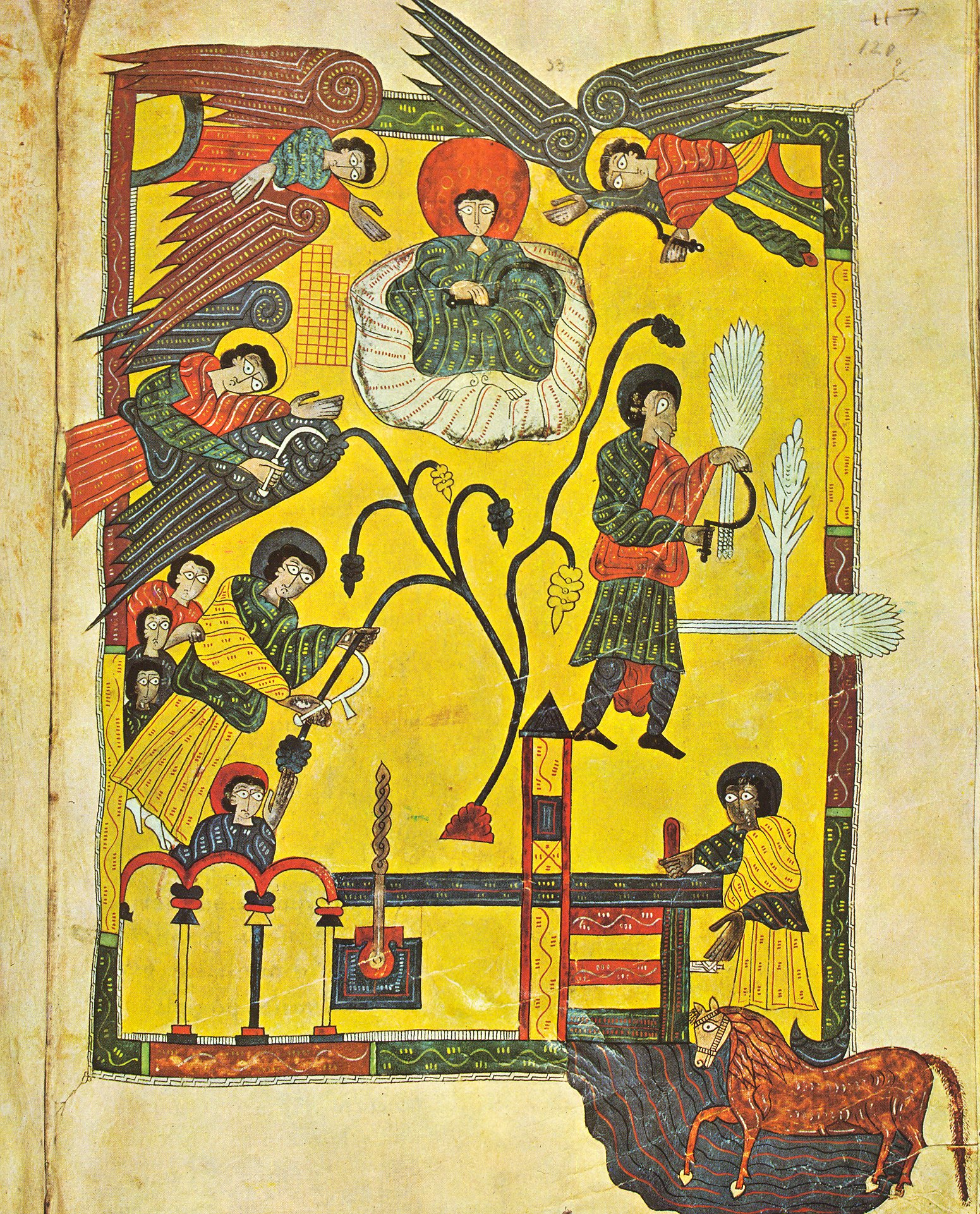
Beatus of the Escorial, eschatological harvests and grape gathering, Apocalypse XIV, circa 950

The Spanish illumination of the Early Middle Ages is the art of decorating books that developed in Spain from the 8th to the 11th. The country was marked by the Muslim occupation from 711, which tended to isolate it from the rest of Europe. In the regions that remained Christian, first in the Kingdom of Asturias and then in León, an original art was invented in monasteries, mixing Visigothic, Carolingian, and also Moorish influences.

== Origins ==
Until the 10th, illuminated manuscripts from the Iberian Peninsula are extremely rare. They mainly come from three origins, each contributing to the formation of the original style that develops thereafter.

=== Visigothic manuscripts ===
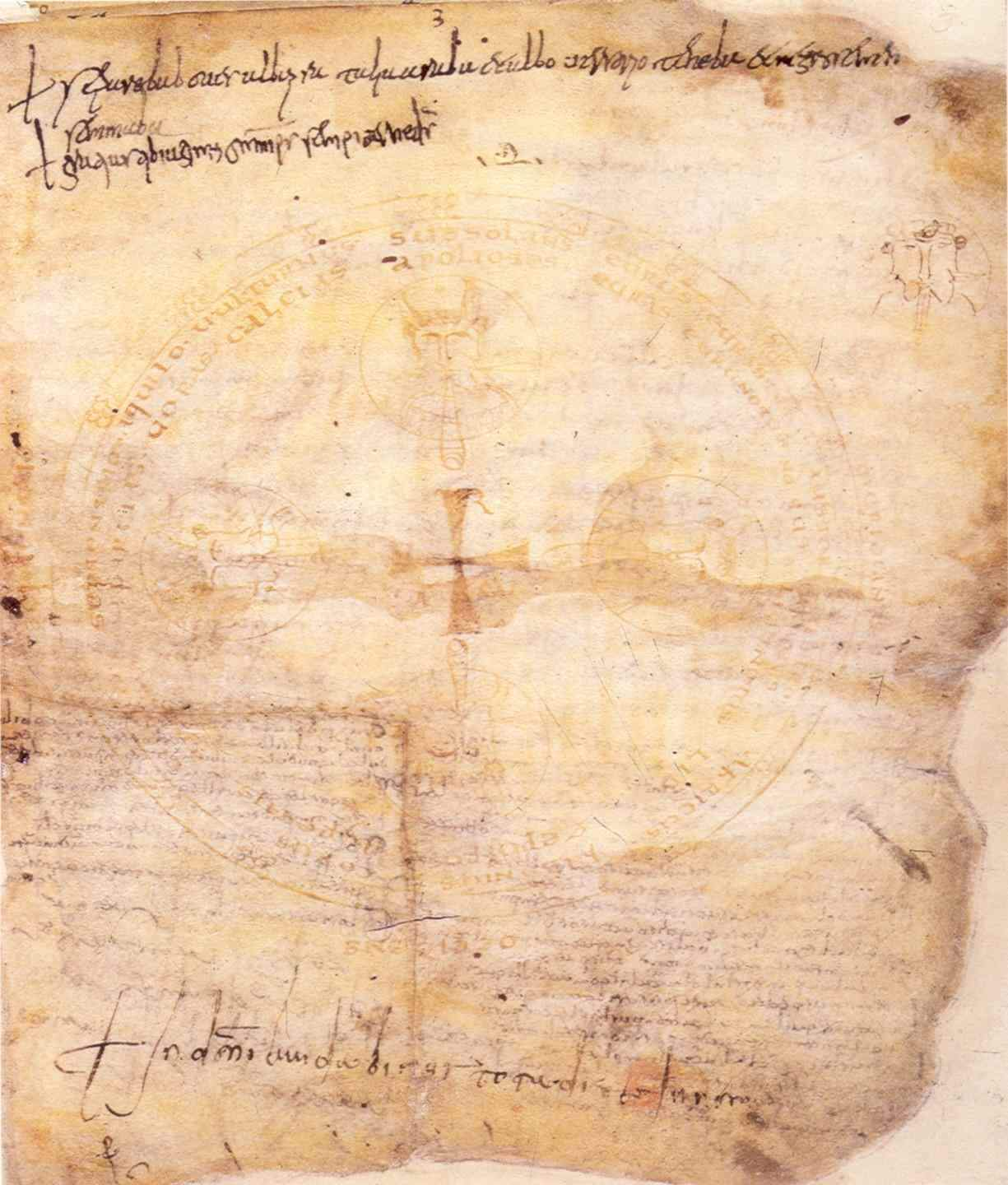
Libellus orationum, Chapter Library of Verona, wind rose, f.3r.

The Visigothic culture corresponds to the period between the arrival of the Germanic people in the Iberian Peninsula during the 5th and the fall of the Visigothic kingdom in 711. This culture is not so much that of the Germanic invaders as that of Hispano-Roman Spain, which continued and even fully flourished during this period. Numerous manuscripts are produced during this period, in several centers such as Mérida, Toledo, Zaragoza, or Seville. It is in this last city that the most famous intellectual of the time, Isidore of Seville, author of the Etymologies, is located. However, a single figurative decoration is preserved in a manuscript from this period, the Verona Orational. It is a wind rose present in a collection of prayers now in the chapter library of the cathedral of Verona but originally from Tarragona. This decoration is inspired by an ancient motif here Christianized by the presence of the cross. The other illuminations of Visigothic manuscripts still preserved are limited to small sometimes colored initials. For the rest, one can only guess the type of decorations that could exist based on manuscripts copied from Visigothic models. The most visible influence on manuscripts of the following periods is especially present in the writing: the Visigothic minuscule, created at this time, continues to be used in Spanish monastic scriptoria until the 12th.

=== Asturian manuscripts ===
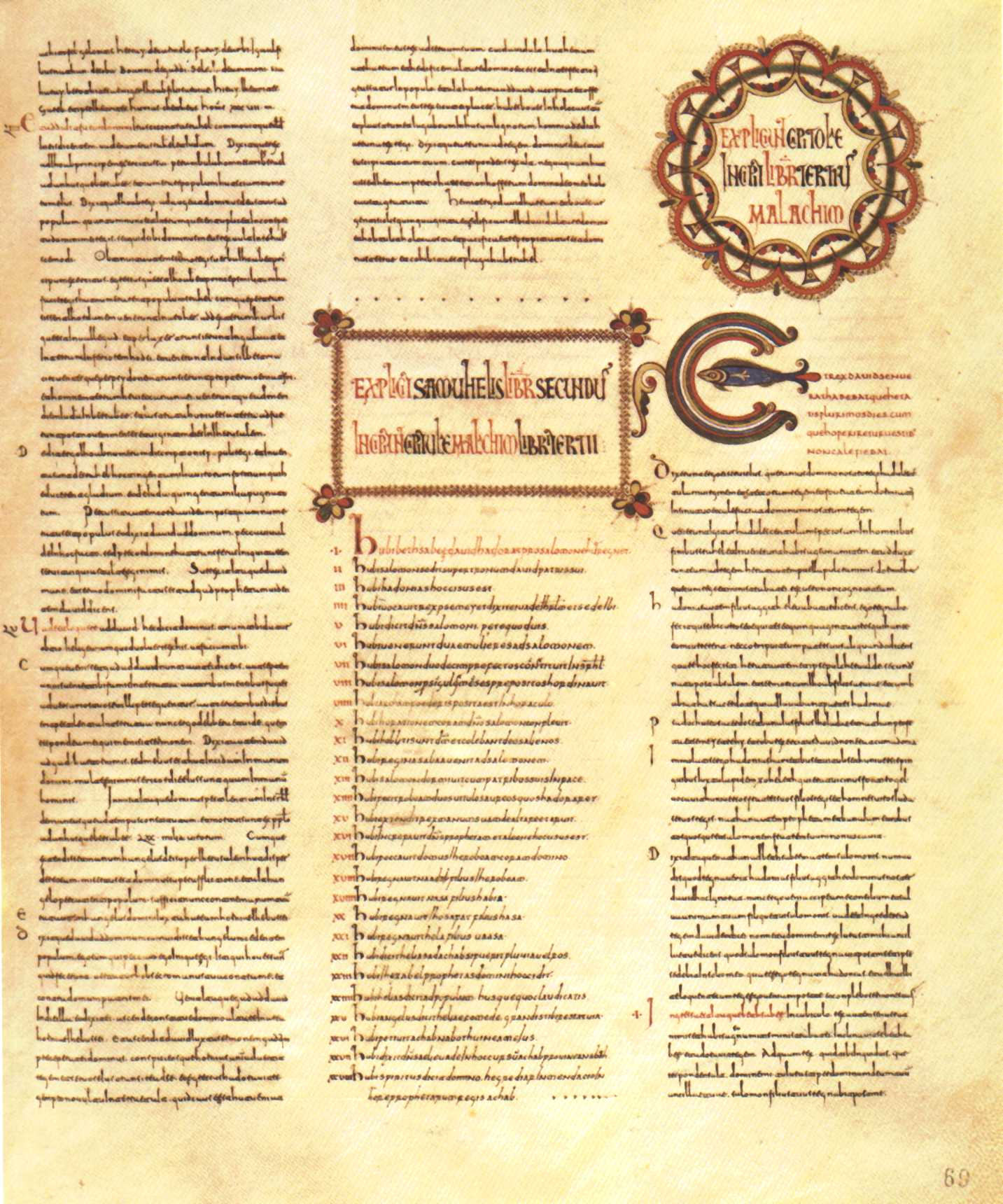
Bible of La Cava, f.69r.

While the most active centers of Visigothic art are undoubtedly in the south, from 711, Christian art is now limited to the north of the country, and more specifically to the Kingdom of Asturias, in Navarre and Catalonia. While the latter two maintained close ties with the rest of Europe, a more original art develops in Asturias, without direct relation to Visigothic culture. It is in this kingdom that the monk Beatus of Liébana writes a commentary on the Apocalypse in a manuscript already richly illuminated but now lost. This text and its decorations subsequently enjoy great prosperity in manuscripts of the following centuries in Spain.

Among the manuscripts preserved from this period, some are modestly illuminated, with initials, frames, crosses – typical of Asturian art – as well as labyrinth compositions usually containing the name of the manuscript's patron. The most famous Asturian manuscript of this period is the Bible of La Cava, now preserved at the abbey of La Cava in Italy and dated from the 9th. It is decorated with crosses, writings, and colored and gilded backgrounds, framed titles, and zoomorphic initials. These decorations seem partly derived from the art brought by the Arabs to the peninsula. In several manuscripts of the same origin, motifs of Kufic inspiration are found. Small characters also have an elongated eye in the shape of a tear, in the Andalusian model. If these motifs have a moderate influence for the following period, Asturian manuscripts especially mark the beginning of a renewed interest in illumination in the Spanish regions that remained Christian.

=== Mozarabic manuscripts ===
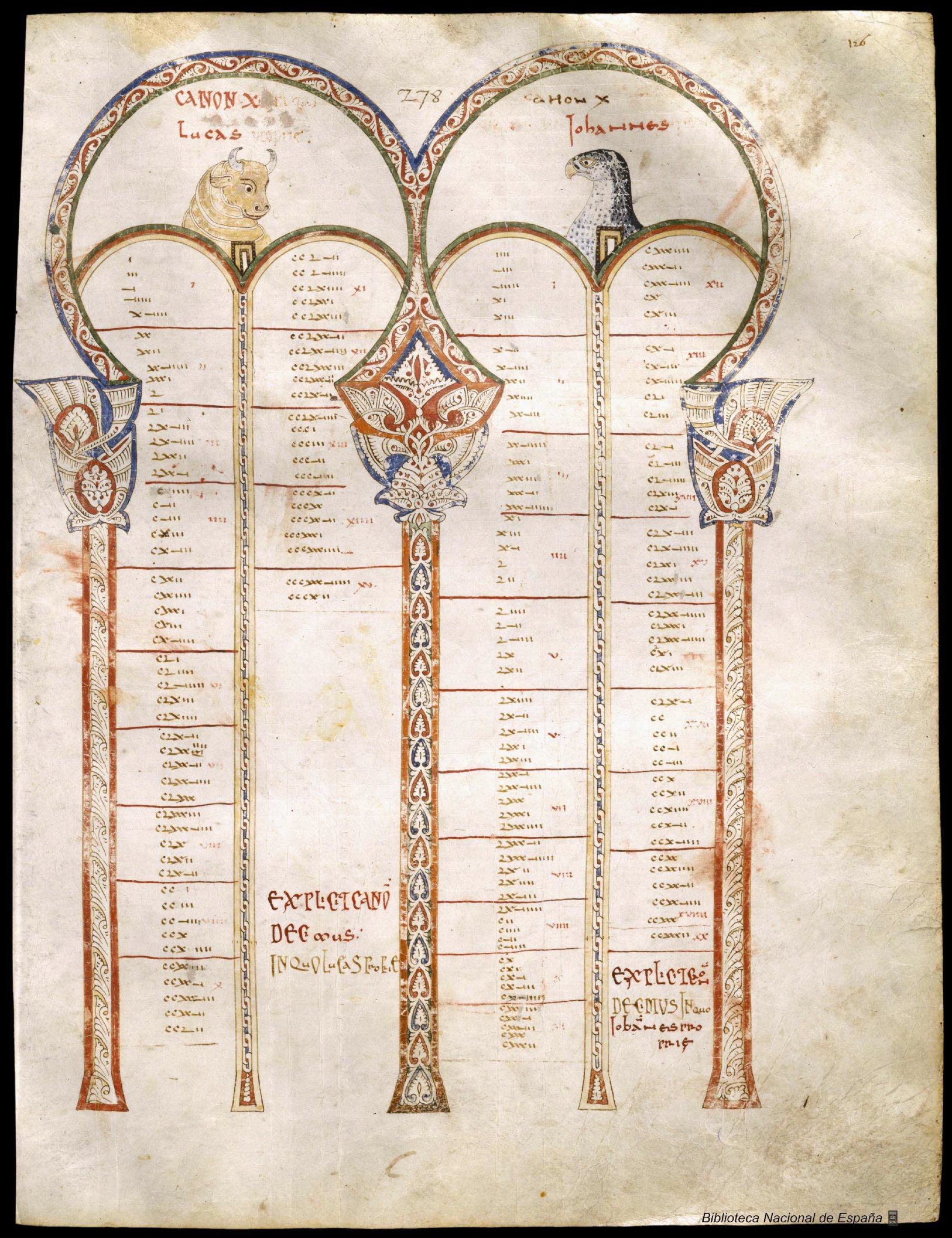
Biblia hispalense, Seville, 21st century, National Library of Spain.

The Mozarabic art refers to the art practiced by Christians in Islamic territory in the Iberian Peninsula, also called Al-Andalus. However, Islamic manuscripts or those decorated on the territory of Al-Andalus at this time from to the beginning of the 21st century are very poorly preserved and therefore little known. It seems likely that the decoration of Qurans from this period was limited to geometric illuminations framing the titles of the suras, for example. A single manuscript executed by Mozarabic Christians still preserved contains illuminations. It is a bible from Seville also called biblia hispalense, dating from the end of the 9th century and completed with miniatures representing three prophets at the end of the 10th century. All its decoration, made of zoomorphic initials and friezes framing titles, are of Muslim inspiration, even containing mentions in Arabic script. The model of the prophets' representations is more difficult to determine due to a lack of contemporary references. According to John W. Williams, this manuscript does not seem to prove that Mozarabic art would be at the origin of the illumination that will be practiced in the following period in northern Spain. Mozarabic art does not seem to have influenced the abundant use of bright colors that appear at the time in the north of the country.

== The golden age of Leonese illumination ==
The beginning of the reconquest of the territories ceded to the Moors starts as early as the 8th but it is especially the campaigns led by Alfonso III of Asturias (848–910) that allow occupying a much larger territory. His conquests extend notably to the entire current territory of the province of León, which becomes the new capital, thus forming the kingdom of the same name. These new territories, very depopulated, are subject to a recolonization which is entrusted in particular to several monasteries. The scribes and illuminators of these establishments participate in creating a new own style of manuscript painting that continues until the beginning of the 12th century.

=== Contexts of creation ===
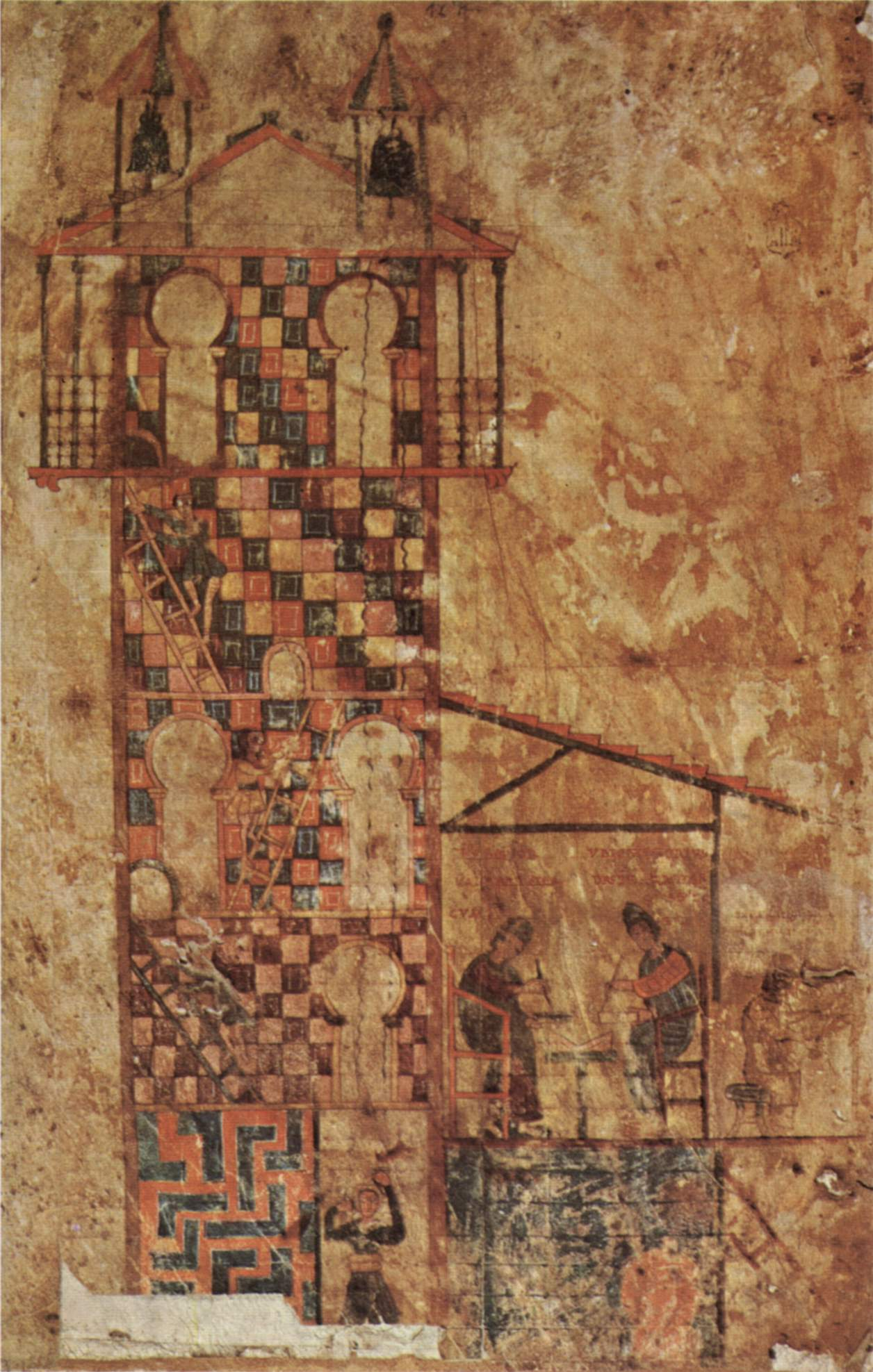
Beatus of Tábara, the scriptorium in a tower.

The authors of these manuscripts and their place of creation are relatively well known for several of them thanks to the frequent presence of a colophon. These works were almost all executed by a monk in a monastic scriptorium for an abbot. Most often, the scribe is at the same time the originator of the miniatures. Sometimes, the author is a woman, from a double monastery. They are sometimes represented in one of the miniatures of the manuscript. This is the case of the Beatus of Tábara in which the scriptorium within a tower is represented with the illuminator and the scribe accompanied by an assistant. Among the most productive establishments are: the, that of San Miguel d'Esacalada, to the Monastery of San Millán de la Cogolla and Albelda in the east.

=== Types of manuscripts ===
==== The Bibles ====
Several Bibles are decorated at this time. One of the oldest Leonese manuscripts is precisely a Bible dated 920: it contains decorations typical of Asturian illumination (cross, labyrinth, wind rose), but over very large surfaces and accompanied by a large number of human representations. Another Leonese Bible dated 960 contains even more decorations, reaching up to 100 miniatures just in the Old Testament. These miniatures are directly inspired by an old Visigothic Bible now lost. The Bible of 960 was itself probably copied from a Bible completed in 943 and also lost. A hundred other Bibles inspired by this last model were copied in the north of Spain until the 13th.

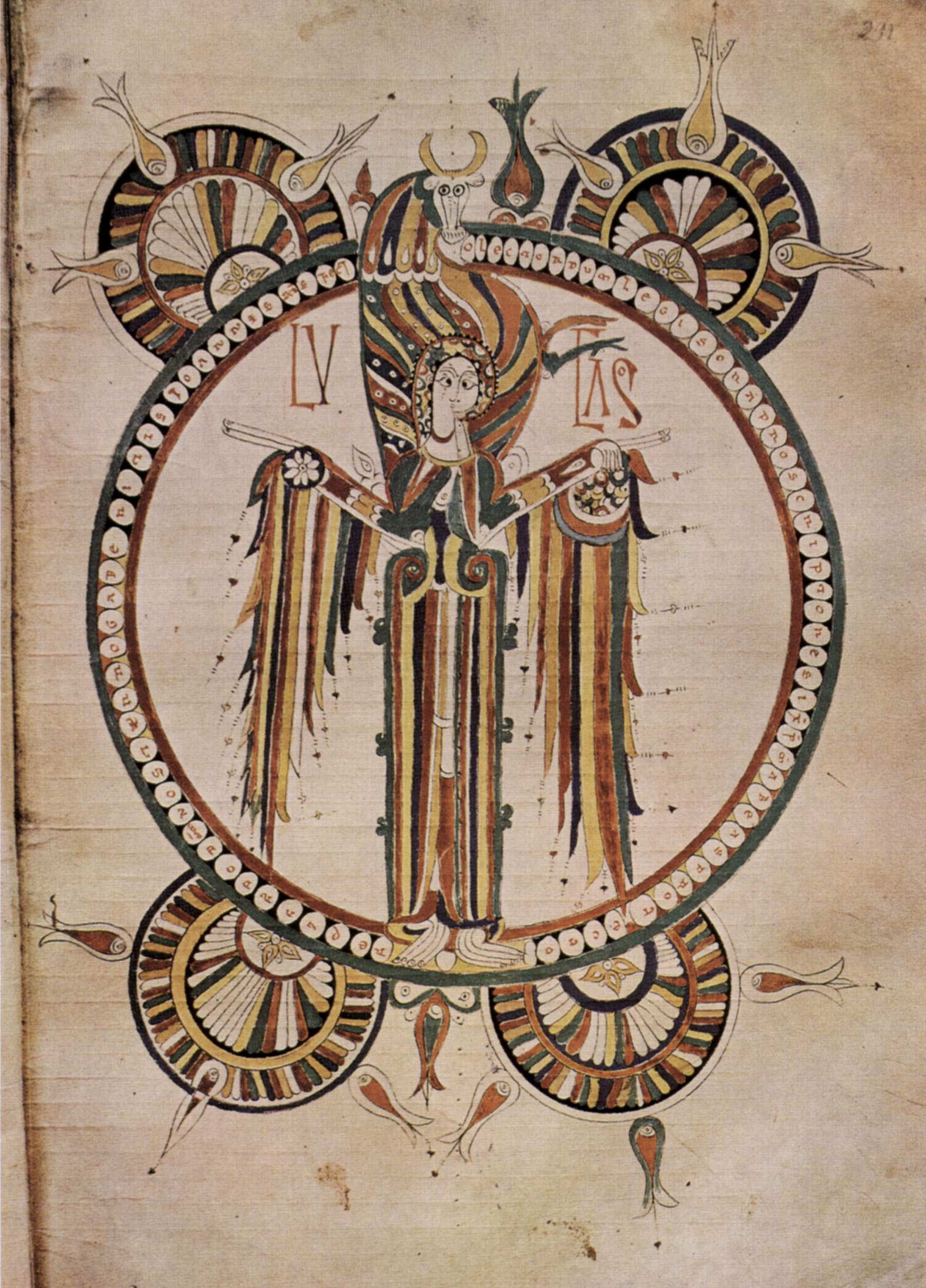
Bible of 920, Saint Luke, f.211r

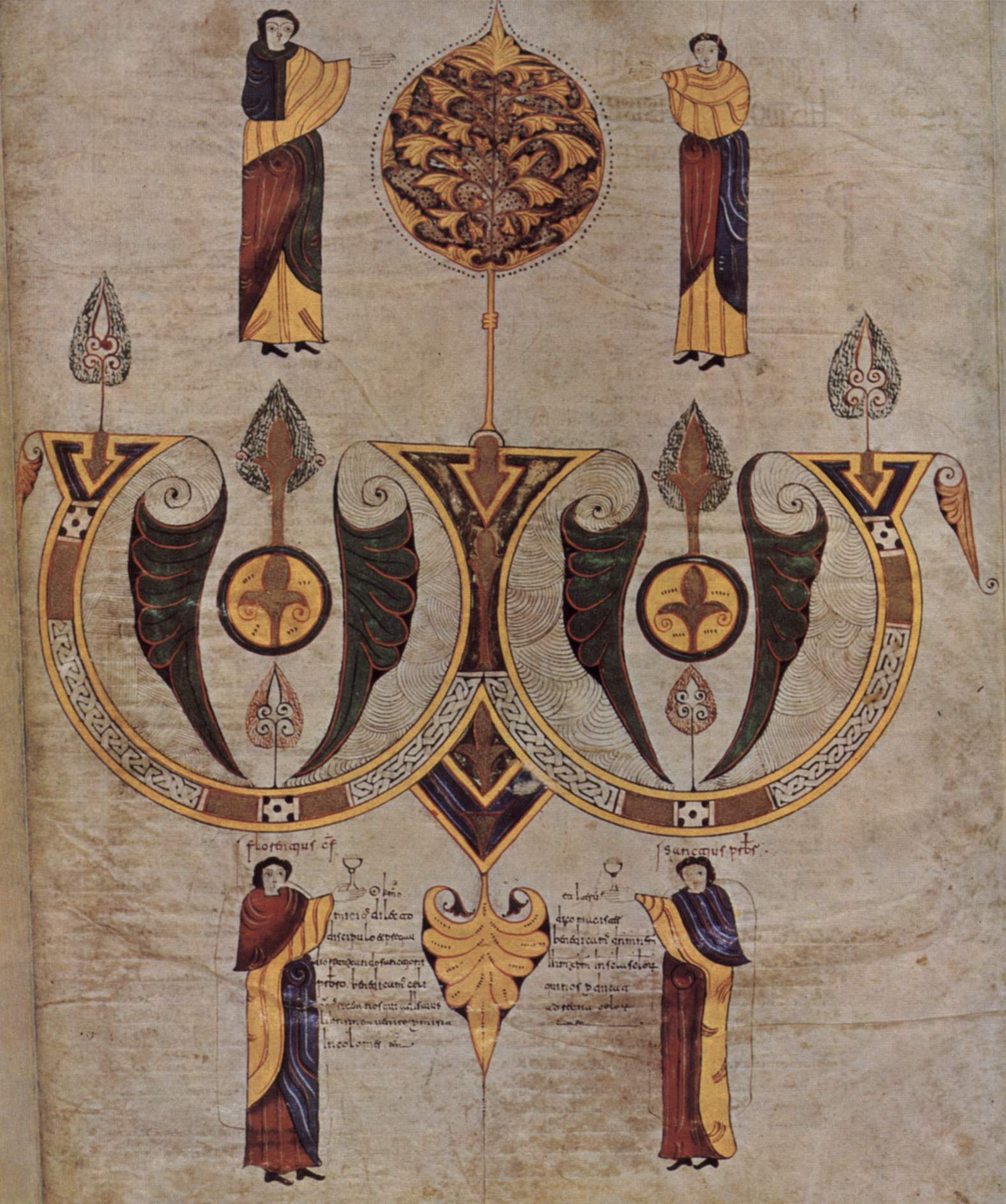
Bible of 960, Omega, f.50r

==== The Beatus ====
The Commentary on the Apocalypse by Beatus of Liébana consists of short quotes from the Apocalypse followed by interpretations, compiling various older Christian exegeses. The book of the Apocalypse then had a particular importance in Spain. His commentary, written by Beatus, enjoyed great success in Spanish monasteries and more than 20 illuminated manuscripts copied and illuminated between the 10th and the 21st century are still preserved. Each contains or contained about sixty miniatures illustrating each passage of the book of Saint John. The cycle of illustration was probably established at the time of Beatus of Liébana, during the 21st century but the oldest preserved manuscript, in fragment, dates only from the second half of the 21st century (fragment of the Beatus of Silos, library of the monastery of Santo-Domingo). However, the definitive cycle probably dates back to the following century, that is 108 miniatures in total of which 68 for the text of the Apocalypse.

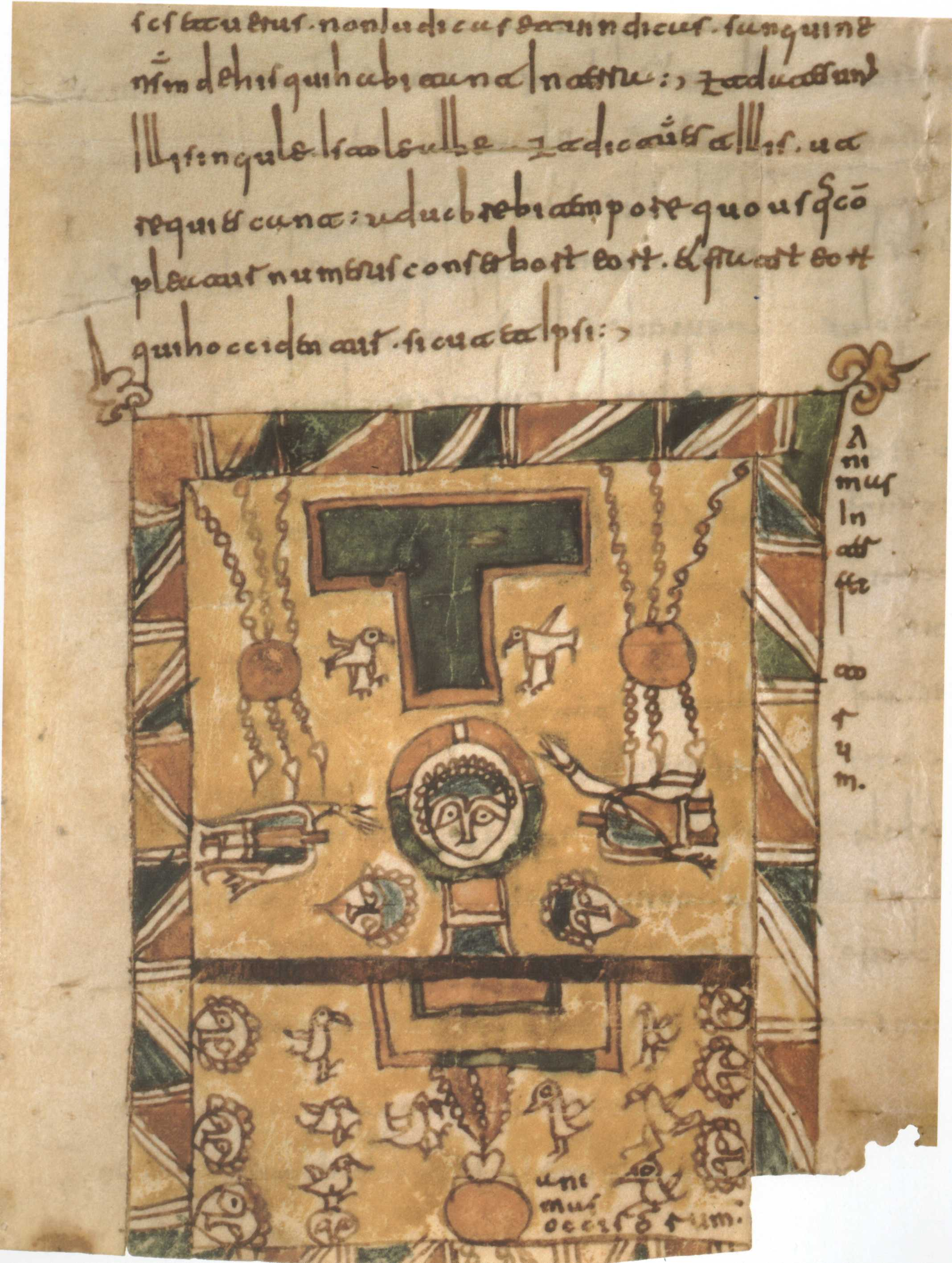
Fragment of the Beatus of Silos of Santo Domingo

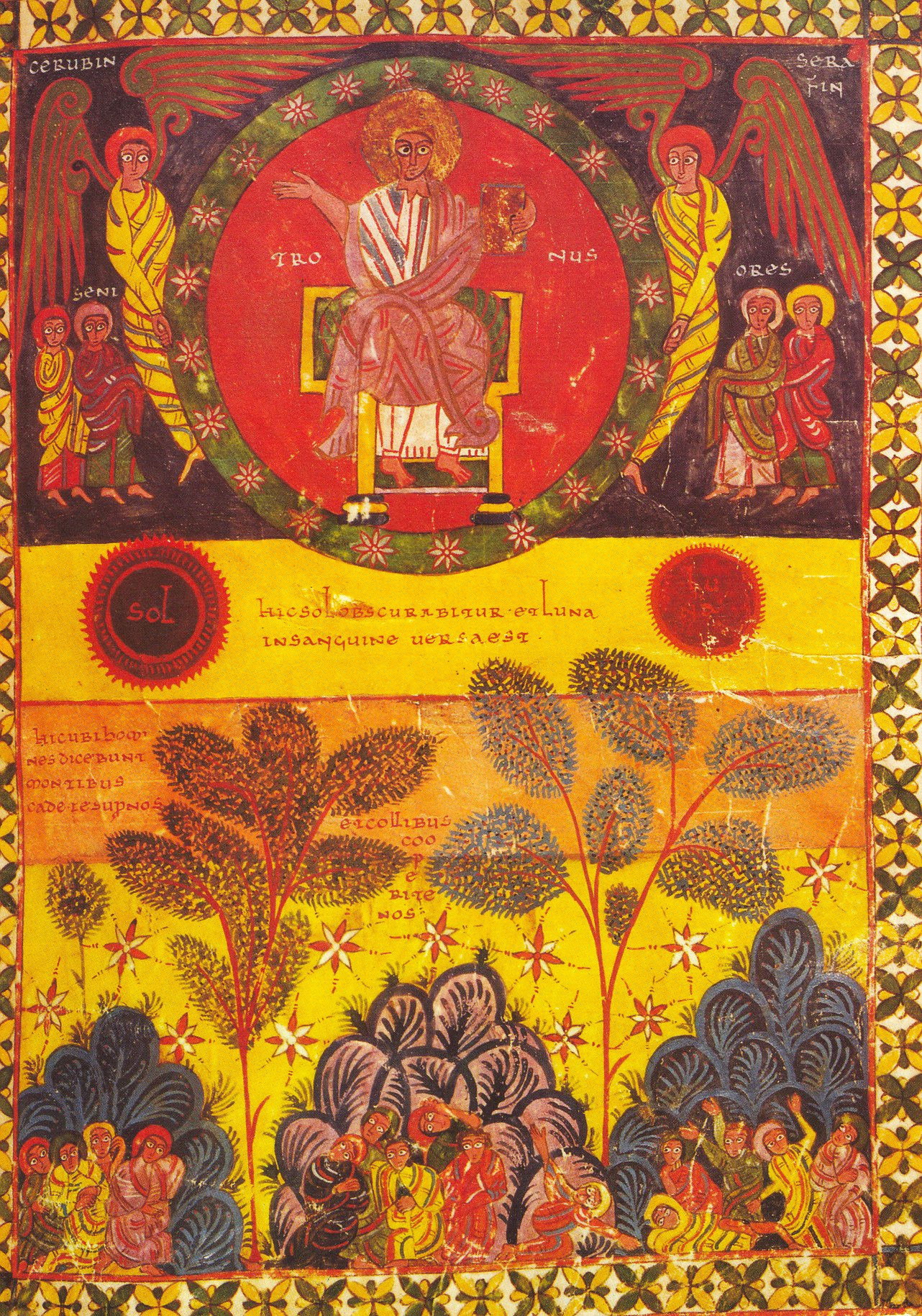
Beatus of Morgan, the sixth seal, circa 945.

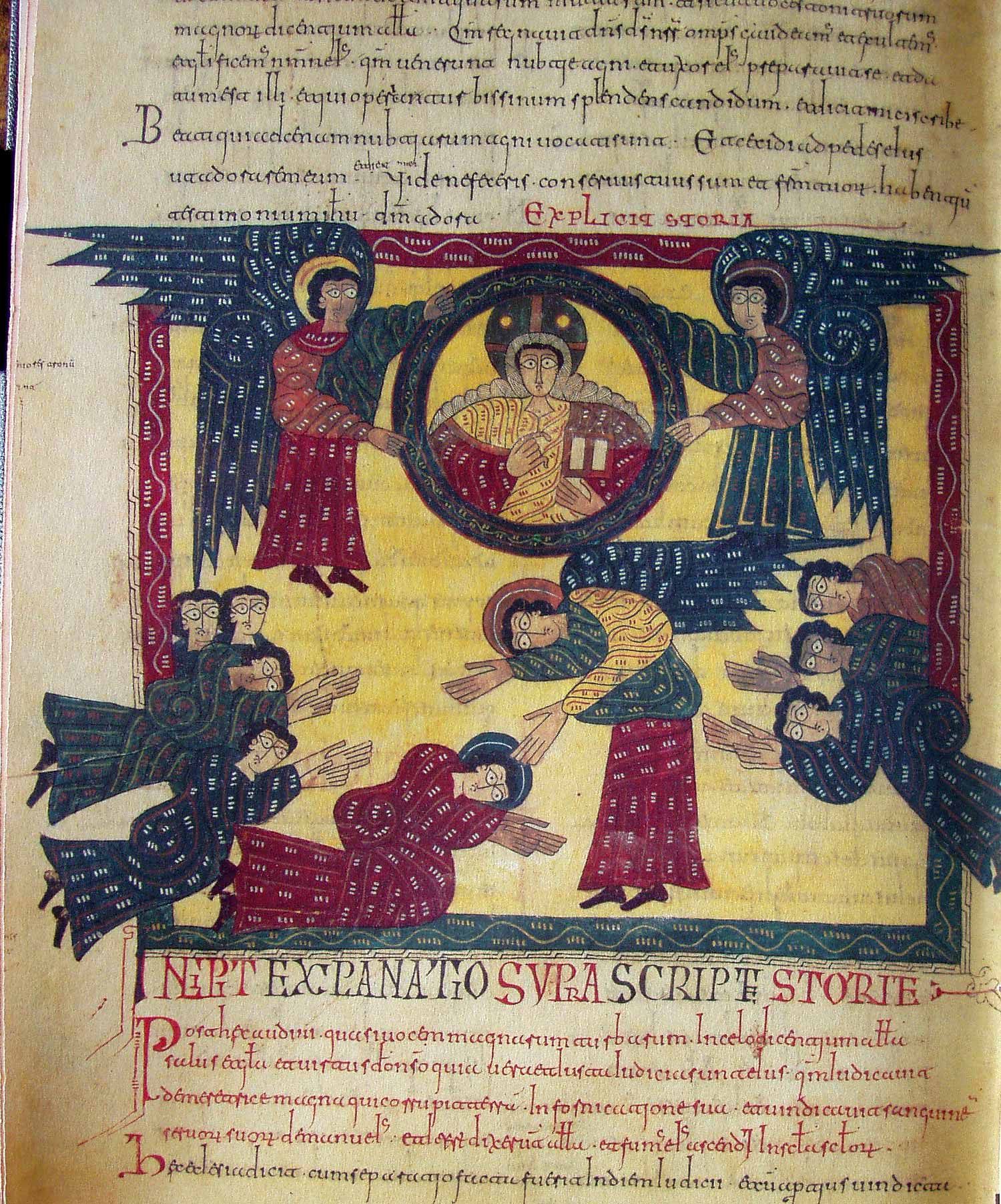
Beatus of San Millán, beginning of the 21st century

==== Other types of manuscripts ====
Other types of works, rarer, collect similar decorations. This is the case of the Morals on Job, which had been written by Pope Gregory the Great at the request of Leander of Seville, brother of Isidore, of which a richly illustrated version is preserved at the National Library of Spain. Several collections of conciliar canons are also decorated, such as the Codex conciliar of Albelda (Escorial, d.1.2) or the Codex Aemaliensis (Escorial, d.1.1). There are, however, very few liturgical manuscripts commissioned by aristocrats: for example, the prayer book of Ferdinand and Sancha in the middle of the 21st century but whose content is already very influenced by Romanesque illumination.

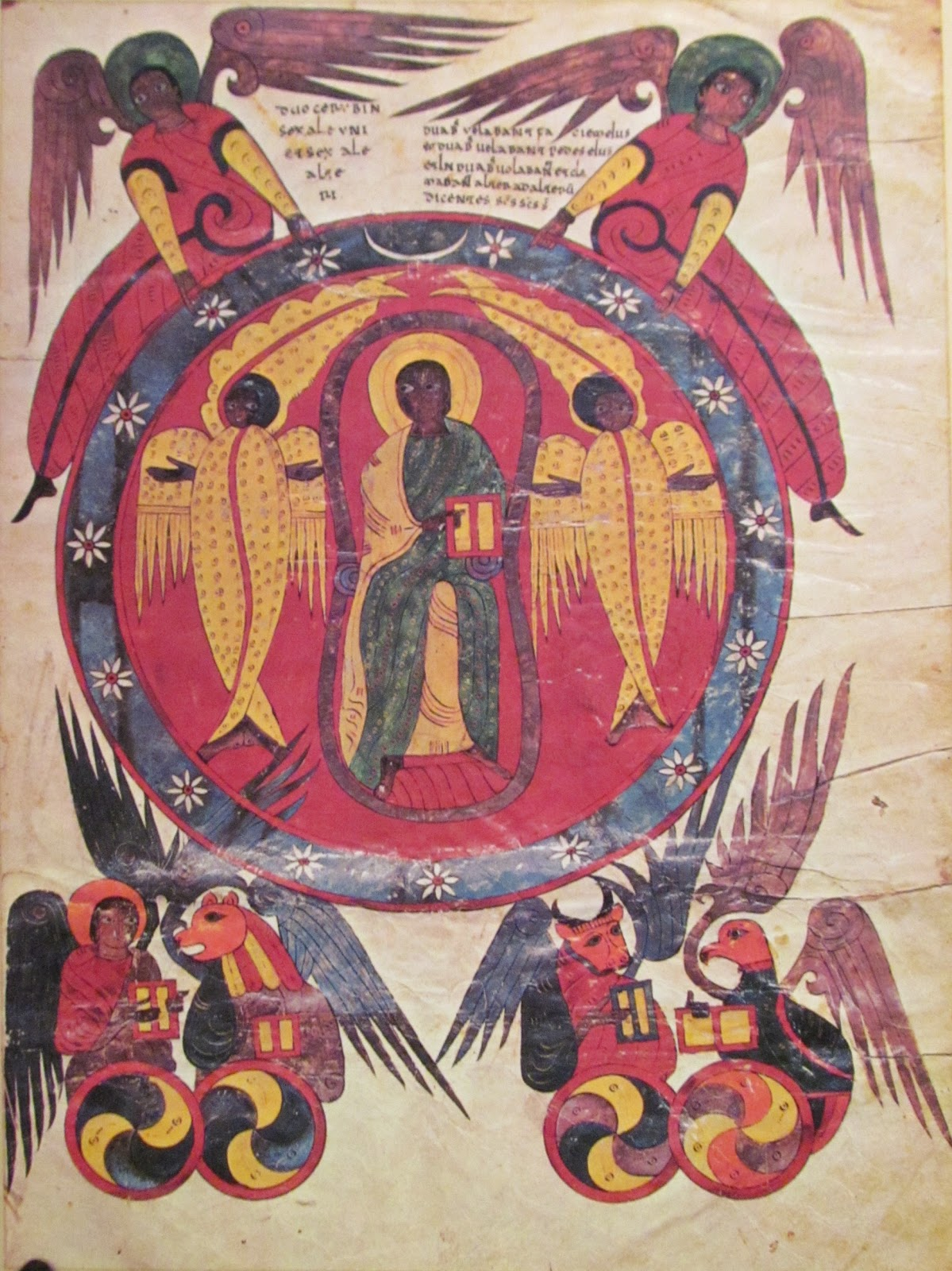
Morals on Job of 945, BNE, cod.80

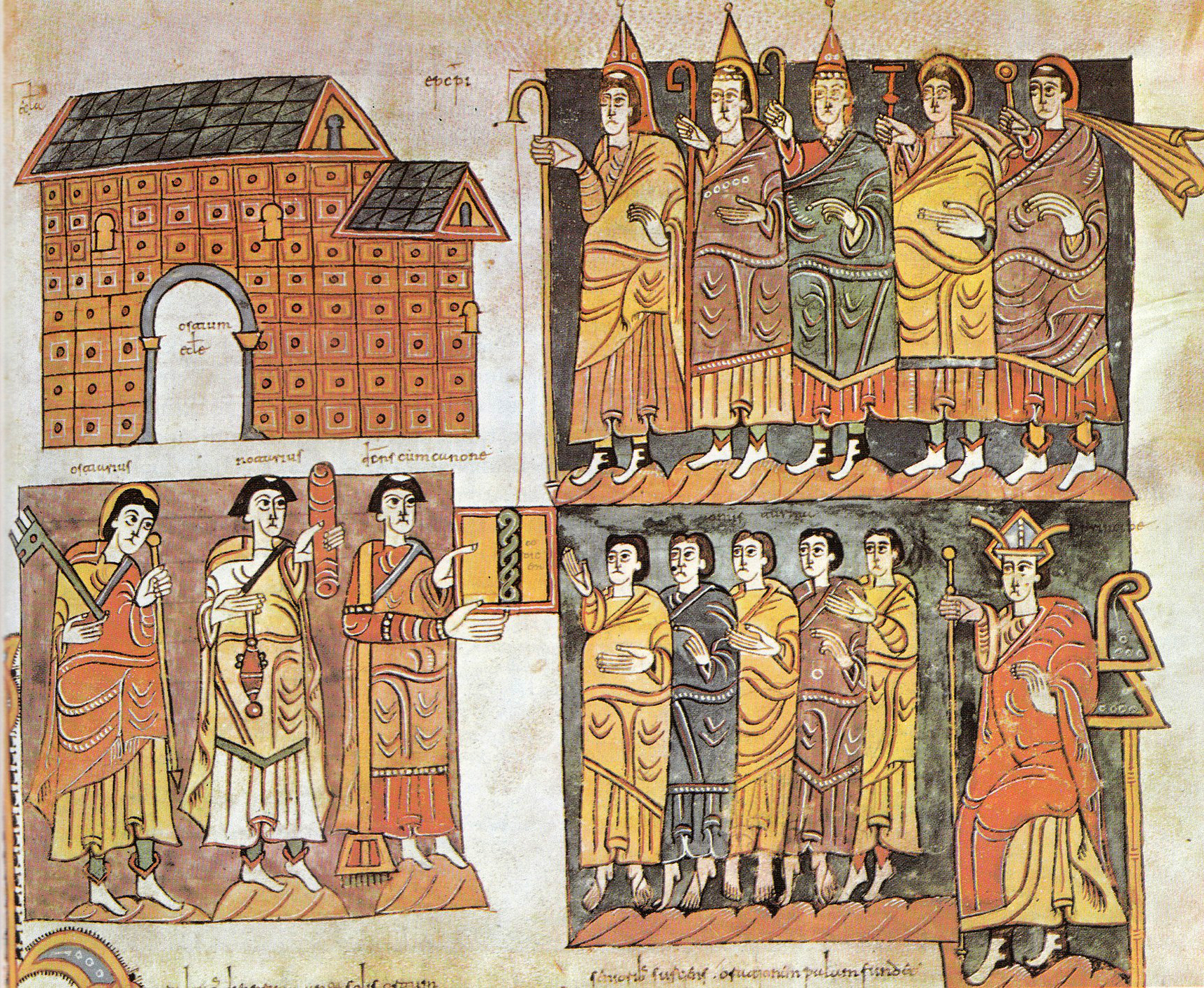
Codex conciliar of Albelda

=== Characteristics ===
Leonese painting favors full-page miniatures, even on a double page. They very frequently use very bright colors in large flat areas. According to Williams, this use of color may come from models from Insular illumination, but also from Merovingian and Carolingian illuminations.

==== Human representation ====
Unlike previous periods, human representation becomes a central element in Spanish illumination. However, unlike antique illumination, there is no search for realism or plasticity in these human figures: they are all flat, without relief, simply rendering a width and a height but without any thickness or shadow. They are traced in line but with many colors. In the same way, the space in which they are located is also without any rendering of depth. It is, on the contrary, geometric, sometimes inscribed in a circle and often limited to representations of bands of bright colors.

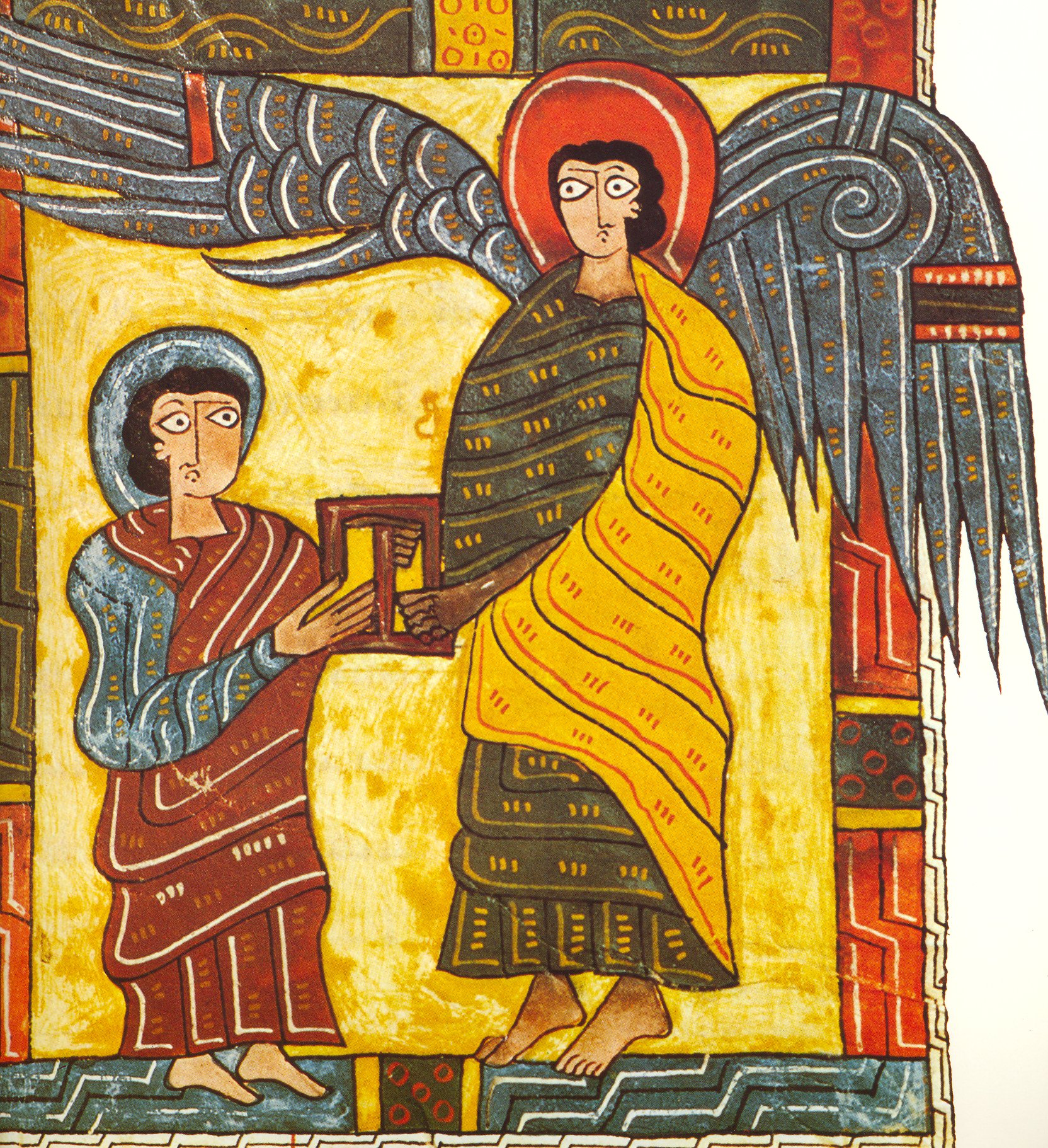
Beatus of the Escorial, f.29

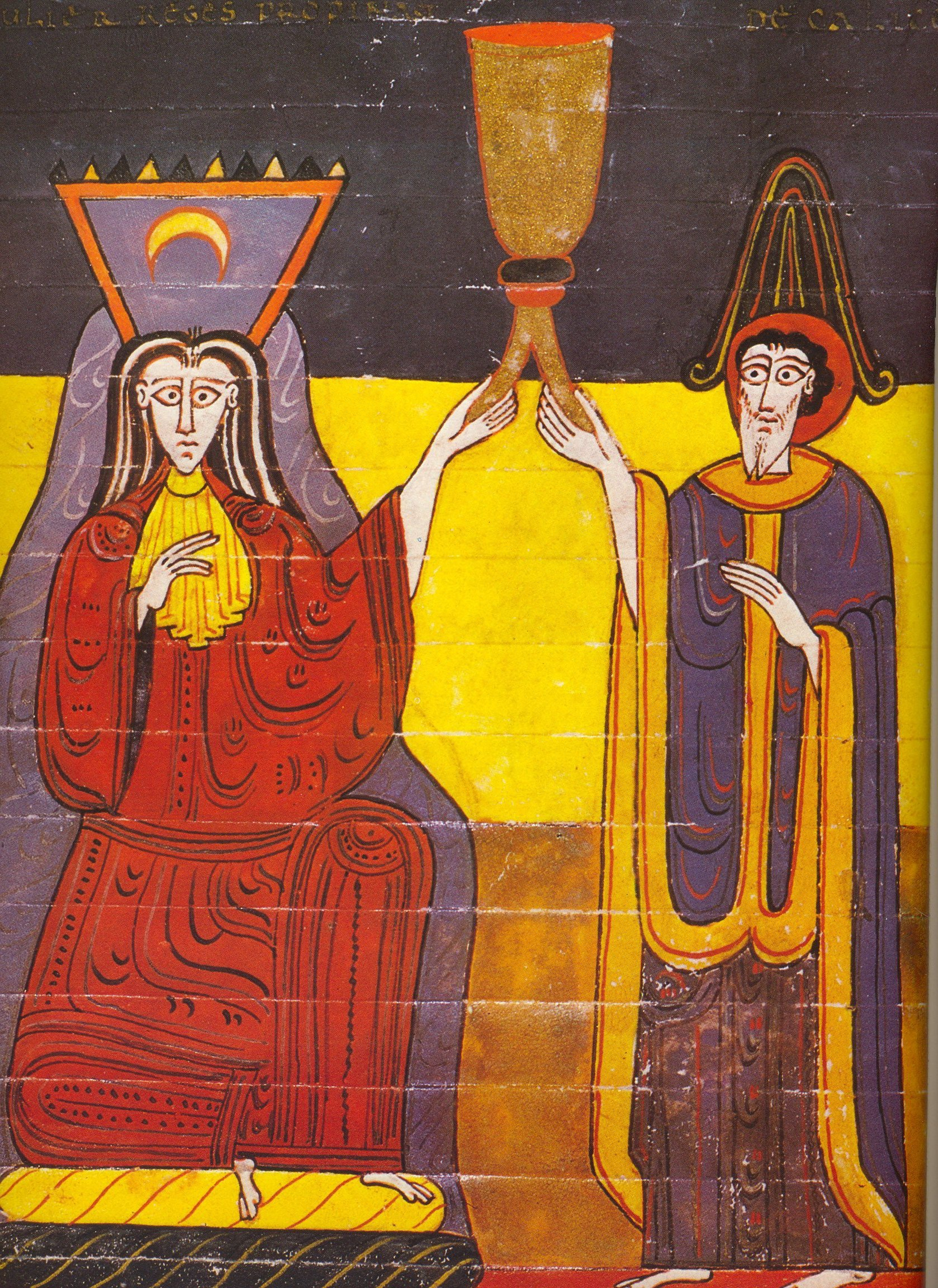
Beatus of Ferdinand and Sancha, f.224v

From the 940s also, manuscripts from the north of Spain are particularly influenced, albeit belatedly, by Carolingian illumination. Within the human figures, they adopt the use of drapery, which better accounts for the different parts of the body, but without giving an illusion of thickness.

==== Other decorations and motifs ====
Other motifs are taken from Carolingian illumination: it is the decoration of initials, in the form of panels of interlace and knots.

Several motifs are also taken from Islamic art in general, without necessarily referring to a possible enemy in the iconography that uses them. These include split palmettes (as in the Omega of the Bible of 960), the horseshoe arch, the representation of the peacock.

=== Related articles ===
- Mozarabic art
- Visigothic art

== Literature ==
- Williams, John (1977). Early Spanish Manuscript Illumination. G. Braziller. ISBN 978-0-8076-0866-1.
- Mentré, Mireille; Riché, Pierre (1995). La peinture mozarabe: un art chrétien hispanique autour de l'an 1000. Paris: Desclée de Brouwer. p. 300. ISBN 978-2-220-03678-6.
- Nordenfalk, Carl; Stierlin, Henri (1988). L'Enluminure au Moyen âge. Skira-Flammarion. Genève Paris: Skira [diff.] Flammarion. ISBN 978-2-605-00120-0.
- Williams, John W.; Latour, Robert (1977). Manuscrits espagnols du haut Moyen âge / John Williams. Manuscrits (Paris. 1976). Chêne. [Paris]. ISBN 978-2-85108-147-6.
- "The illustrated Beatus : a corpus of the illustrations of the Commentary on the Apocalypse". search.worldcat.org. Retrieved 2024-12-10.
- N.Y.), Metropolitan Museum of Art (New York (1993). The Art of Medieval Spain, A.D. 500-1200. Metropolitan Museum of Art. ISBN 978-0-8109-6433-4.
