= Seppä =

Seppä is a Finnish surname meaning "smith". Notable people with the surname include:

- Jyrki Seppä (born 1961), Finnish ice hockey player
- Pirjo Seppä (born 1946), Finnish orienteer
- Heikki Seppä (1927-2010), Finnish-American silversmith

== See also ==
- Sepp, an Estonian surname with the same meaning (smith)
- Seppo
