= Sept (disambiguation) =

A sept is a division of a family, usually of a Scottish or Irish family.

Sept may also refer to:

- Sept. a common abbreviation for September
- La Sept, a former French television channel
- La Sept (album), a 1989 Michael Nyman album promoting the television station
- A type of temple used by the Faith of the Seven in A Song of Ice and Fire / Game of Thrones
- The number 7 in French
- "Sept", a song by Sweet Trip from their album Velocity : Design : Comfort

== See also ==
- Sep (disambiguation)
