= Catacombs of Commodilla =

Burial complex in Rome, Italy

Coordinates: 41.861184°N 12.483502°E

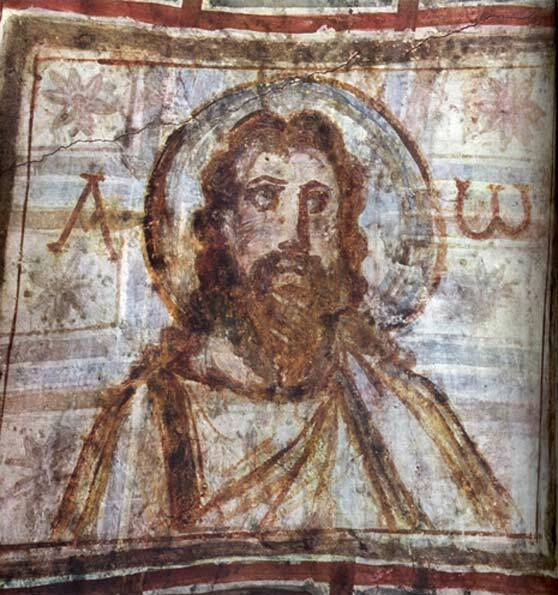
Wall painting of a bust of Christ from the Catacombs of Commodilla

The Catacombs of Commodilla or Catacombs of Felix and Adauctus is a three-level underground burial complex forming one of the catacombs of Rome. It is sited on via delle Sette Chiese, not very far from via Ostiense, in the Ostiense quartiere. One name derives from its founder or the donor of the land on which it was built, whilst the other its after the two main martyrs buried there, Felix and Adauctus.

The earliest level is the most interesting in archaeological terms, re-using an ancient pozzolana quarry and housing Felix and Adauctus' tombs in a small underground basilica (which contained the notable Commodilla catacomb inscription). The other two levels were developed out from this level. No remains of monuments connected to the complex survive above ground

== History ==
From objects found in the complex, it has been dated to the mid 4th century, although other characteristics suggest the early 4th century. The earliest account of the Felix and Adauctus' martyrdom places it in the last years of Diocletian, which suggests that the pozzolana quarry may already have been partly used as a burial place before its closure and full transformation into a cemetery in the second half of the 4th century. Burials in it ceased after the end of the 4th century and in the following two centuries it was only in devotional use.

As with other underground Christian cemeteries, it was later transformed into a site for the cult of the martyrs - several popes restored the underground basilica up until the 9th century, showing the complex was a place of pilgrimage. Coins with the head of pope Gregory IV (827-844) have been found in it, though Felix's and Adauctus' relics were finally removed by pope Leo IV (847-855) to give to Lothar I's wife, leading the complex to be abandoned until Antonio Bosio rediscovered it in 1595. However, it was only identified as being the catacombs of Commodilla in the 19th century by Giovanni Battista de Rossi, with restoration work at the start of the 20th century leading to the whole second cemetery level (the former quarry) being completely excavated.

== Other martyrs ==
Along with Felix and Adauctus, the complex also traditionally housed the remains of:

- two martyred sisters, Degna and Merita, killed under Valerian and buried "in Commodilla" according to the liturgical sources; Merita's name is in a fresco near to Felix and Adauctus' burial place (though archaeologists are not unanimous in their identification) but no trace of Degna's name has been found in the catacombs; their names seem to have been derived from popular belief based on Roman funerary inscriptions, with both sisters' remains transferred under Pope Paul I to San Marcello al Corso, where a side-chapel in the nave has an oil painting of their martyrdom
- the Martyrologium Hieronymianum mentions a Gaudentia on 29 August beside Felix and Adauctus, but no trace of her name has been found in the complex
- a high medieval pilgrims' guide mentions Nemesius, another martyr, not mentioned in any other documents

== Description ==
A unique feature of the complex and of the catacomb of Saint Thecla compared to other catacombs in Rome is the presence of burials 'a pozzo' (literally, in the well), meaning deep ditches containing up to 20 burial niches along the sides, placed one on top of the other. The Commodilla complex is also marked by poor iconography, architecture and epigraphy - its marble inscriptions often include spelling errors and 'cubiculi' and arcosolium tombs are rare.

The small underground basilica dedicated to Felix and Adauctus is artistically notable, however. Under Pope John I (523-526) it was re-excavated, adapting part of the former pozzolana quarry on the second level, which was closed and enlarged to make room for the martyrs' cult. The martyrs' burial spots have been identified in the basilica, in two niches, one on top of the other, with a fresco of them both above them.

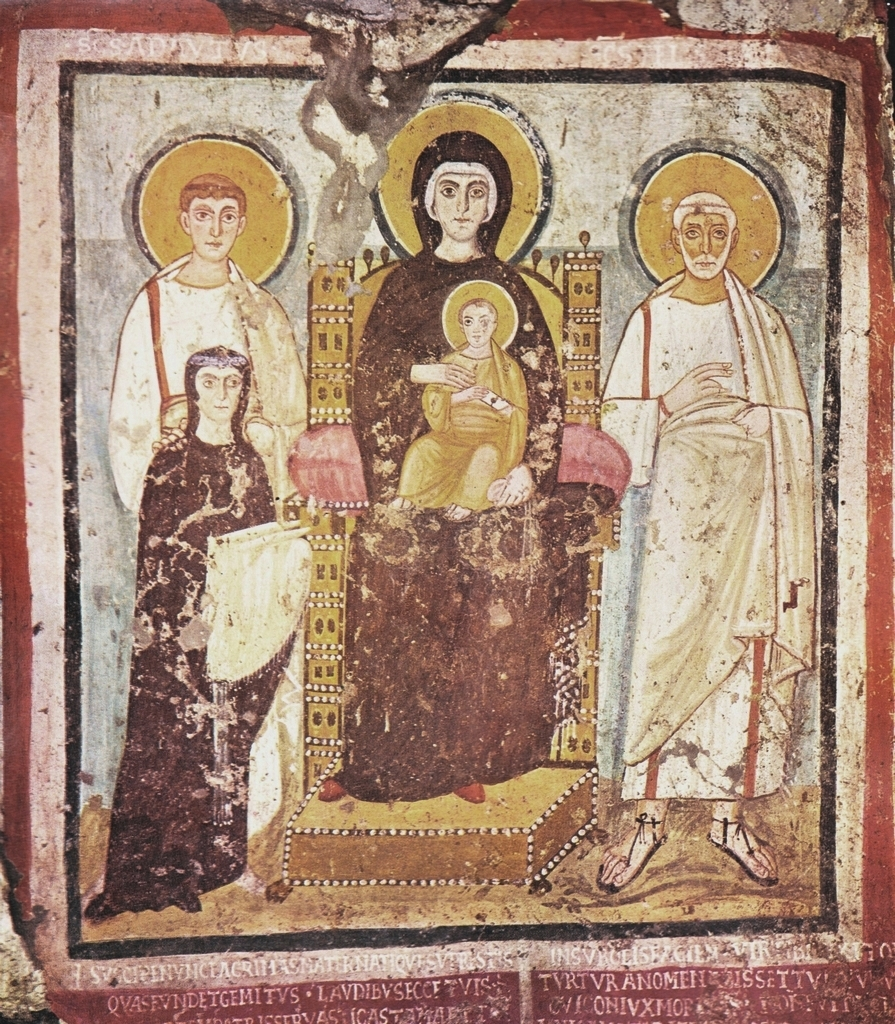
Fresco of the Madonna Nikopoia with Saints Felix and Adauctus and the donor Turtura.

Other features are:

- the so-called 'tomb of Turtura' (mid 6th century) - a tomb built for a woman by her son, with a fresco of her, the two main martyrs and the Madonna and Christ Child inscribed "Your name was Turtura, and you were in effect a real tortora".
- the fresco of Saint Luke, second half of the 7th century - shows him with a small bag of surgical instruments
- fresco showing a seated Christ on a globe giving the keys to Saint Peter, surrounded by the named saints Adauctus, Merita, Paul of Tarsus, Felix and Stephen

At the centre of the complex is also the so-called 'cubiculum of Leo', a Roman annona official (second half of the 4th century), who commissioned it for him and his family. Discovered in 1953, it is completely covered with frescoes of biblical scenes.

== Bibliography ==
- Francesco Sabatini, Un'iscrizione volgare romana della prima metà del secolo IX, «Studi linguistici italiani», VI, 1966, pp. 49–80
- Deckers, Johannes Georg; Mietke, Gabriele; Weiland, Albrecht (1994). Die Katakombe "Commodilla". Repertorium der Malereien. Mit einem Beitrag zu Geschichte und Topographie [The Catacomb "Commodilla". Repertory of Paintings. With a contribution on history and topography]. 3 volumes. Vatican City: Pontificio Istituto di Archeologia Cristiana, ISBN 88-85991-11-4.
- Giuseppe Biamonte, Lionella De Santis, Le catacombe di Roma, Newton & Compton Editori, Roma, 1997, pp. 88–96 ISBN 978-88-541-2771-5
- Claudio Marazzini, Breve storia della lingua italiana, Il Mulino, Bologna, 2004 ISBN 88-15-09438-5
- "L'iscrizione funeraria di un giovane cristiano in Commodilla". Archived from the original on 5 October 2010.
