= Felix of Thibiuca =

4th-century martyr

Saint Felix of Thibiuca

Martyr & Bishop

Saint Audactus Saint Fortunatus Saint Januarius Saint Septimus

Martyrs

Felix (d. 303) was a bishop of Thibiuca in Africa who was martyred during the Great Persecution under the Roman emperor Diocletian alongside Audactus, Fortunatus, Januarius, and Septimus. Felix is said to have resisted the command of the local magistrate Magnillian (Latin: Magnillianus) to surrender his church's copies of the Christian scriptures.

In one account, Felix and the others were taken to Carthage and decapitated on July 15. These Five Martyrs of Carthage were venerated in the basilica of St Faustus. Another placed his martyrdom at Venosa in Italy. His companions may have been deacons but, apart from their joint martyrdom with Felix, are now unknown. (Note: The Dictionary of Christian Biography lists a St Januarius martyred on October 24 with a Felix. He is said to have been a priest.) Their feast day was observed jointly on October 24, but it has been shifted to July 15 since 2004.

Felix was formerly honored as the patron saint of Venosa.

== See also ==
- Other saints Felix
- Other saints Audactus
- Other saints Fortunatus
- Other saints Januarius
- Other saints Septimus
