= Saint Clement and Sisinnius inscription =

11th-century Romance and Latin inscription

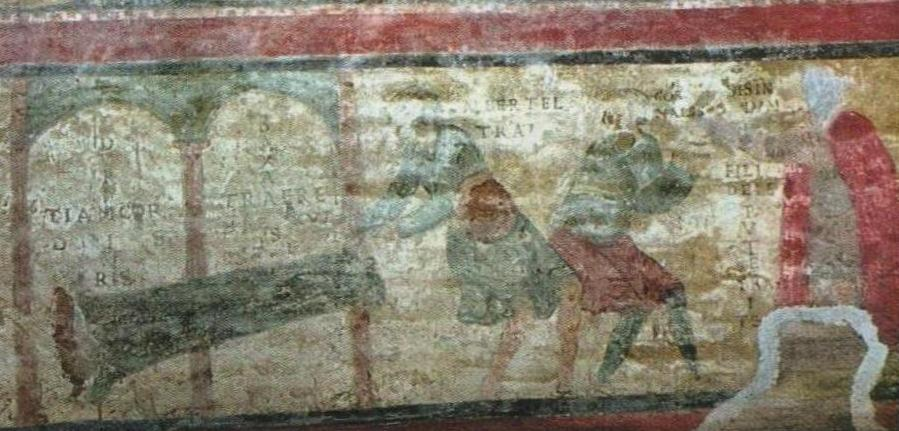
2009 photo of the fresco (Sisinnius is on the right; click to image page for captions)

The Saint Clement and Sisinnius inscription (Italian: Iscrizione di San Clemente e Sisinnio), written around the end of the 11th century AD, is located in the subterranean chapel of the Basilica of San Clemente al Laterano in Rome. It is the very first known example of the Italian language used in a work of art.

== Content ==
The inscription consists of the dialogue of the characters depicted on the fresco. In a scene taken from the Passio Sancti Clementis ("Martyrdom of Saint Clement"), a certain Sisinnius (implied to be a corrupt master or boss) is instructing his servants to drag Saint Clement off to prison, unaware that the latter has escaped and that what they are dragging along is really a stone column.

The dialogue is as follows:

- Sisinnium: "Fili de le pute, traite! Gosmari, Albertel, traite! Falite dereto colo palo, Carvoncelle!"
- Sanctus Clemens: "Duritiam cordis vestris, saxa traere meruistis".

Or in English:

- Sisinnius: "Pull, you sons of bitches! Gosmario, Albertello, pull! Get in there with the pole, Carboncello!"
- Saint Clement: "You deserve to drag stone on account of the hardness of your hearts."

This is an early example of dialogue written next to the characters who speak it, a phenomenon that would later become common in comics.

== Linguistic analysis ==
Sisinnius and his workmen speak in an early form of Romanesco, whilst Saint Clement expresses himself in Medieval Latin. This juxtaposition of the 'rude' vernacular with the 'holy' liturgical language is deliberate and meant to reflect the different moral standings of the characters involved. A rough modern equivalent might be the master speaking in a working-class New York accent, while the saint speaks in King James English.

Nevertheless, St. Clement's dialogue contains a number of mistakes, which was common for the time. Duritiam, the accusative, is written instead of the ablative duritia; the form vestris is a mistake for vestri, likely by contamination with the ending of the preceding cordis; and finally, the letter h (which was already oft-unpronounced from Early Vulgar Latin) is missing from trahere.

The expression falite is composed of fa 'do.IMP', li 'him.DAT' and te 'you.ACC', an order that follows the Tobler-Mussafia Law of clitic placement in early Romance.

The name Carvoncelle, ultimately derived from Latin carbonem 'charcoal', shows the passage of /rb/ to /rv/, a change characteristic of Romanesco as well as other Central Italian dialects.

== Bibliography ==
- Migliorini, Bruno. 2007. Storia della lingua italiana. Milan: Bompiano.
- Bruni, Francesco. 1984. Elementi di storia della lingua e della cultura italiana. Turin: UTET.
- Baldelli, Ignazio & Vignuzzi, Ugo. 1985. Filologia, linguistuica, stilistica. In Letteratura italiana 4, vol. 4. Turin: Einaudi.
- Lupercini, Romano & Cataldi, Pietro & Marchiani, Lidia & Marchese, Franco. Il nuovo. La scrittura e l'interpretazione. Vol. 1. Palumbo editore.
- Migliorini, Bruno. 2007. Storia della lingua italiana. Milan: Bompiano.
- Politzer, Robert L. 1954. On the Central Italian development rv > rb. Italica 31. 93–98.

== See also ==
- Veronese riddle
- Placiti Cassinesi
- Commodilla catacomb inscription
