= Sep (given name) =

Sep is a masculine given name and nickname, often a short form of Septimus. It may refer to:

- Sepandar Kamvar (born 1977), American computer scientist, artist, author and entrepreneur
- Sep Lambert (1876–1959), Irish cricketer
- Sep Ledger (1889–1917), South African rugby union player
- Sep Ruf (1908–1982), German architect and designer
- Sep E. Scott (1879–1965), British painter, illustrator and comics artist
- Sep Smith (1912–2006), English footballer
- Sep Vanmarcke (born 1988), Belgian road racing cyclist
- Sep Visser (born 1990), Dutch international rugby union player

== See also ==
- Sepp (given name)
