= Placiti Cassinesi =

Official 10th C. documents written in a Romance vernacular in Italy

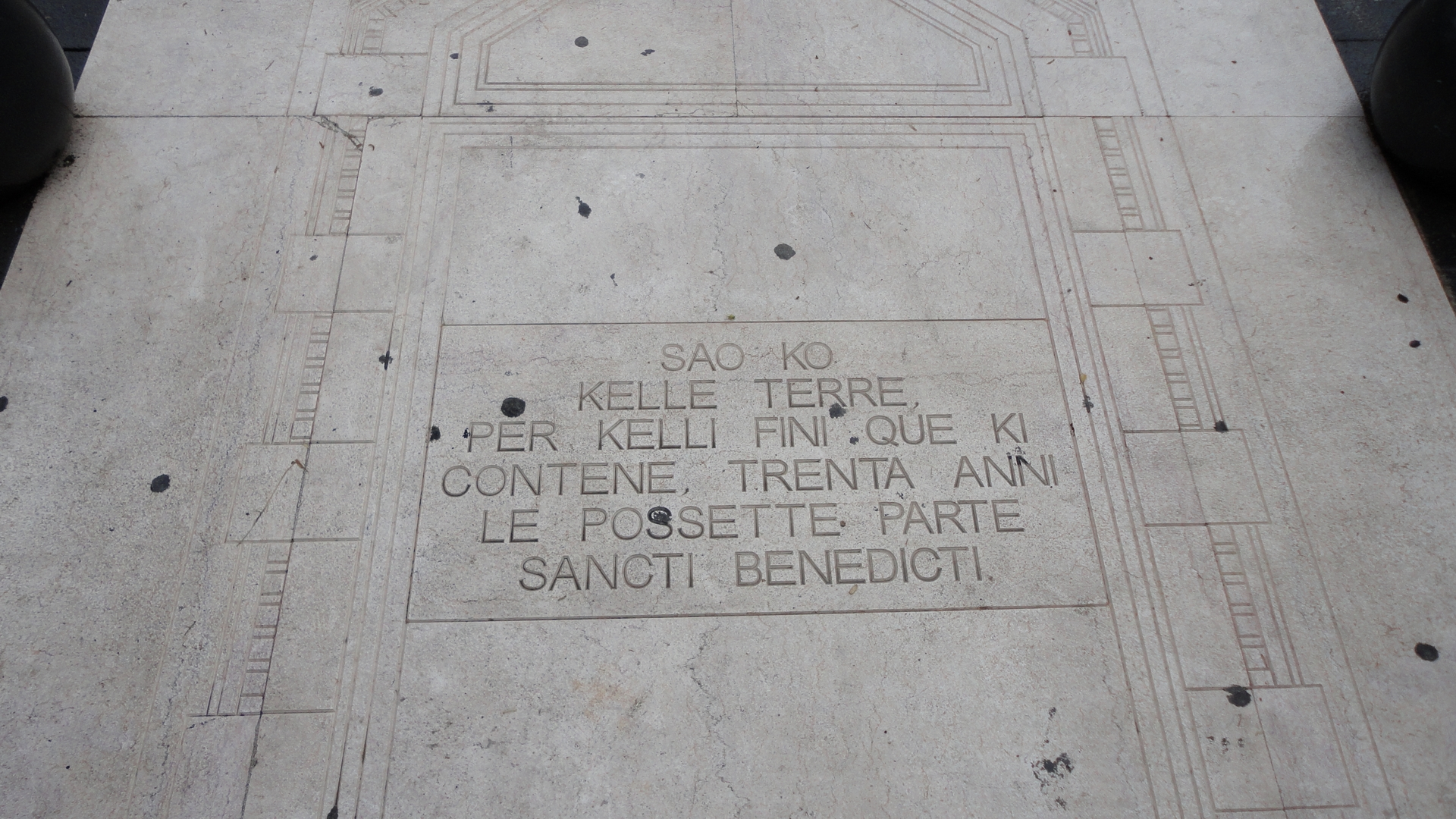
- Marble inscription of one of the placiti in the town of Capua.
- Language: Romance vernacular of Italy
- Date: 960-963
- Provenance: Monte Cassino, Italy
- Manuscript(s): 4
- Genre: Juridical document
- Subject: Resolution of a property dispute

The Placiti Cassinesi are four official juridical documents written between 960 and 963 in southern Italy, regarding disputes on several lands among three Benedictine monasteries and some local landowners. They are considered the first extant documents written in a Romance vernacular of Italy, along with the Veronese Riddle and the Commodilla catacomb inscription.

== Text ==
Original text:

Sao ko kelle terre, per kelle fini que ki contene, trenta anni le possette parte Sancti Benedicti.
Sao cco kelle terre, per kelle fini que tebe monstrai, Pergoaldi foro, que ki contene, et trenta anni le possette.
Kella terra, per kelle fini que bobe mostrai, sancte Marie è, et trenta anni la posset parte sancte Marie.
Sao cco kelle terre, per kelle fini que tebe mostrai, trenta anni le possette parte sancte Marie.

Translation:

"I know that these lands, within the borders shown here, have been owned by the monastery of St. Benedict for thirty years."
"I know that these lands, within the borders that I have shown you, belonged to Pergoaldo, and he has owned them for thirty years."
"This land, within the borders that I have shown you, is property of Saint Mary, and the monastery of Saint Mary has owned it for thirty years."
"I know those lands, within the borders that I have shown you, have been owned by the monastery of Saint Mary for thirty years."

Notable is the use of <k> and <cc> where modern Italian spelling uses <qu>; the spelling Sao for "I know" (Modern Italian So) and the -b- in the imperfect verbs ( -v- in modern Italian.)

== Explanation ==
The four placiti were discovered by Erasmo Gattola in the Benedictine monastery of Monte Cassino in the 1700s. They were meant to resolve land disputes in Capua, Sessa Aurunca and Teano, between three monasteries owned by Monte Cassino and Rodelgrimo d'Aquino and other local landowners. The depositions given by the witnesses were used to confirm that the monasteries were the legitimate owners of the land in question.

== See also ==
- Veronese Riddle
- Commodilla catacomb inscription
- Saint Clement and Sisinnius Inscription
