= Veronese Riddle =

Late Latin riddle from Northern Italy

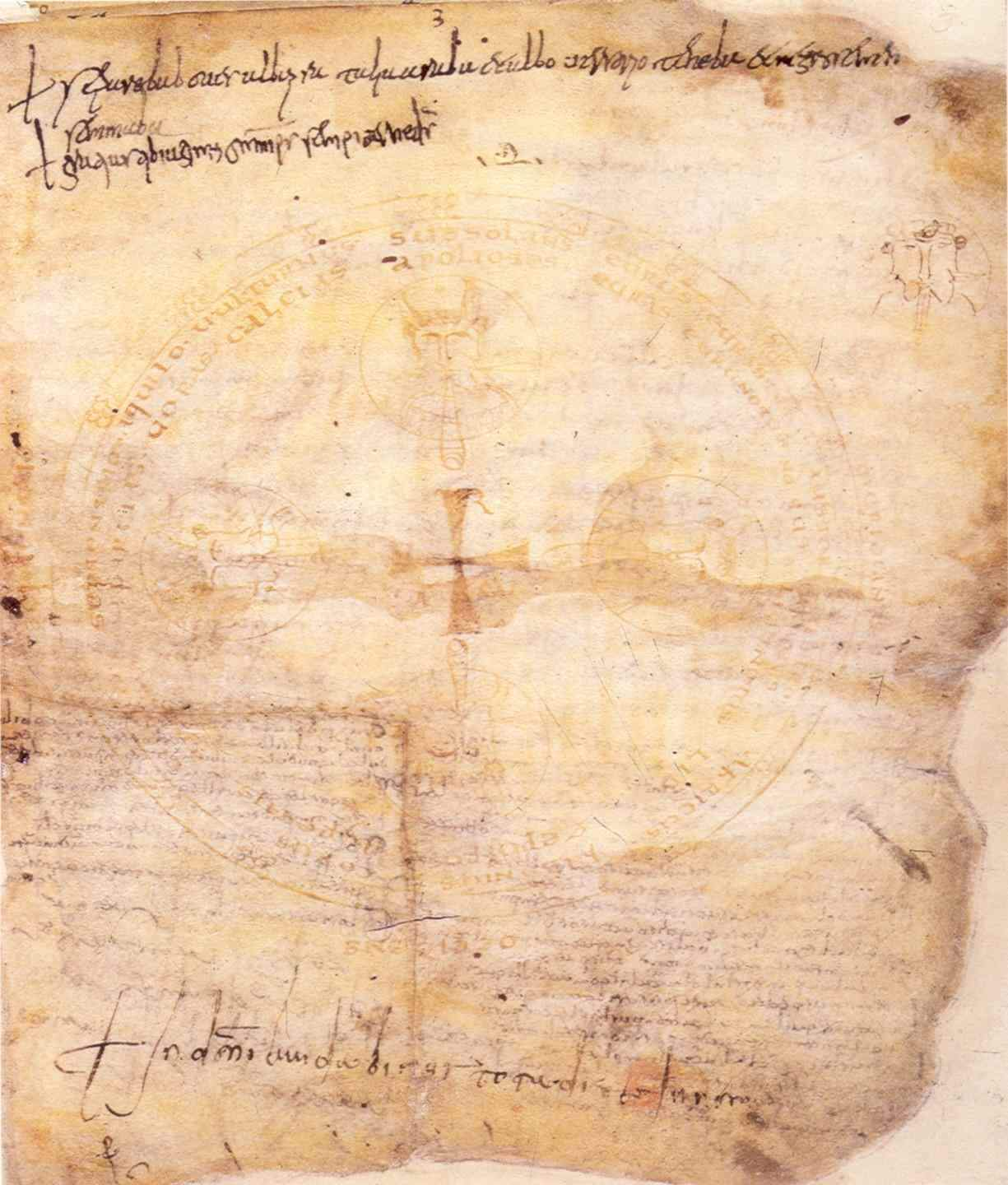
- Original text
- Full title: Indovinello Veronese (Italian)
- Language: Medieval Latin / Early Romance
- Date: 8th or early 9th century
- Provenance: Verona, Italy
- Genre: Riddle

The Veronese Riddle (Italian: Indovinello veronese) is a riddle written in either Medieval Latin or early Romance on the Verona Orational, probably in the 8th or early 9th century, by a Christian monk from Verona, in northern Italy. It is an example of a writing-riddle, a popular genre in the Middle Ages and still in circulation in recent times. Discovered by Luigi Schiaparelli in 1924, it may be the earliest extant example of Romance writing in Italy.

== Text, translation and interpretation ==
The riddle is written in two lines without word divisions. A semi-diplomatic transcription (with line numbering added) is as follows:

1 ✝separebabouesalbaprataliaaraba&albouersorioteneba&negrosemen
2 seminaba

Monteverdi 1937 argues that the riddle is structured as two poetic lines of rhythmic hexameter.

A literal translation reads:

Se pareba boves
alba pratalia araba
et albo versorio teneba
et negro semen seminaba

Translation:

He led oxen in front of him
ploughed white fields
And held a white plough
And sowed black seed

The subject of the sentence, which is left implicit, is generally assumed to be a ploughman. The solution of the riddle then consists of identifying this ploughman with the writer or scribe himself: the oxen are a metaphor for his fingers, which draw a feather (the white plow) across the page (the white field), leaving a trail of ink (the black seed). This interpretation was suggested first by Lina Calza, an undergraduate student at the University of Bologna in the 1920s, who inspired her professor, Vincenzo De Bartholomaeis, a famous philologist, to look into the variations of this riddle among her contemporaries in the Apennines, the mountain range between Bologna and Florence. The origin of the metaphor of ploughing and sowing for writing has been traced to classical Latin literature and Latin epigraphy.

There are a few complications to the interpretation of the first clause. The translation above is based on assuming that ⟨pareba⟩ is a form of the verb parare 'lead' and ⟨se⟩ is a reflexive pronoun (corresponding to Classical Latin sibi). Vincent (2016) instead takes the verb as a form of parere 'seem', and accordingly translates "se pareba boves" as "it (the hand) seemed like oxen".

The placement of the word ⟨se⟩ at the start of the sentence violates an observed generalization about the position of proclitic pronouns in medieval Romance languages, called the Tobler-Mussafia law. Instead of a pronoun, ⟨se⟩ has sometimes been read as an adverb derived from Latin sic, or as a prefix forming a word like ⟨separaba⟩. However, Pescarini (2021) concludes the word is most likely a pronoun, but one that functions grammatically as a weak tonic form rather than a proclitic.

In his biography of Charlemagne, Johannes Fried states that the first two lines refer specifically to stretching the vellum and coating it with chalk in preparation for writing.

== History of the manuscript ==
The Riddle was written in Verona at the end of the eighth century or beginning of the ninth on a page of a preexisting liturgical text, the Verona Orational (codex LXXXIX (89) of the Biblioteca Capitolare di Verona). The parchment is a Mozarabic (i.e. Visigothic) oration by the Spanish Christian Church, probably written in Toledo. The book was brought from there to Cagliari and then to Pisa before reaching the Chapter of Verona.

The riddle was probably written by a scribe as a probatio pennae (a test to check that a pen was writing well). It was discovered by Schiapparelli in 1924.

Beneath the riddle, the page contains another line, unquestionably in Latin, which reads "✝ gratias tibi agimus omnip[oten]s sempiterne d[eu]s". Based on the handwriting, Stefanini (2004) interprets this as a second note written by a separate scribe.

== Linguistic traits ==
The text diverges from Classical Latin in the following traits, which can be considered vernacular features.

- Phonetic differences:
  - Omission of final -t in the verbs pareba, araba, teneba, seminaba (in contrast to standard Latin third-person singular forms, such as arabat)
  - Use of -e- in place of Classical Latin short -i- in the first syllable of negro
  - Use of -o in place of Classical Latin -um at the end of the words albo, versorio and negro
- Differences in vocabulary:
  - Use of the term versorio for "plough" (vs. Classical Latin aratrum); this can be found (in the form versòr) in today's Veronese dialect (and other varieties of Venetan)
  - Use of the term pratalia for "fields" (vs. Classical Latin agros), also a Veronese lexeme
  - Use of the verb parar(e) for 'push on', 'drive', 'lead'. The form ⟨pareba⟩ shows replacement of the first-conjugation vowel -a- with the second-/third-conjugation vowel -e-, a change that is attested occasionally in imperfect verb forms in some Romance dialects.

On the other hand, in a few aspects the text appears to share features with Classical Latin as opposed to vernacular speech:

- Use of -b- instead of -v- in the imperfect verbs pareba, araba, teneba, seminaba. This is presumably a historical spelling of the sound /v/.
- Use of final -n in semen

Some features of the text are shared with Classical Latin, but can also be found to some extent in vernacular languages of Italy:

- The noun boves is identical to the Latin accusative masculine plural form, rather than displaying a vocalic plural ending (as in modern Standard Italian buoi). Michele A. Cortelazzo and Ivano Paccagnella say that the plural -es of boves may well be considered Ladin and therefore a genuine Romance plural rather than a Latinism.
- As in Latin, the neuter plural ending -a is found on both the noun and adjective in alba pratalia. Remnants of -a as a neuter plural adjective ending are attested in some early vernacular Italo-Romance texts, although in Old Veronese (and Northern Italo-Romance more generally) such forms are rare and mostly restricted to phrases where a unit of measure was combined with a numeral.
- The adjective albo 'white' is not necessarily a Latinism. It corresponds to the Classical Latin lexeme albus, but is also attested in Old Italian, in competition with the Germanic bianco which eventually ousted it from its place in everyday speech in most of Italy.

== Identity of its language ==
There has been debate over what language the riddle is written in and to what extent the author intended to represent a language distinct from Latin. It has been variously argued to be a Latin text with vernacular influence, a conscious representation of a Veronese "volgare", or a Latin-Romance hybrid (that is, a text written in a style that may have intentionally simplified or modified the conventions of written Latin to bring it closer to the spoken vernacular language).

Though initially hailed as the earliest document in a vernacular of Italy in the first years following Schiapparelli's discovery, today the record has been disputed by many scholars from Bruno Migliorini to Cesare Segre and Francesco Bruni, who have placed it at the latest stage of Vulgar Latin, though this very term is far from being clear-cut, and Migliorini himself considers it dilapidated. At present, the Placito Capuano (AD 960; the first in a series of four documents dated AD 960–963 issued by a Capuan court) is considered to be the oldest undisputed example of Romance writing in Italy.

== See also ==
- Placiti Cassinesi
- Commodilla catacomb inscription
- Saint Clement and Sisinnius Inscription

== Bibliography ==
- Andreose, Alvise; Minervini, Laura (2022). "Documentation and Sources". In Ledgeway, Adam; Maiden, Martin (eds.). The Cambridge Handbook of Romance Linguistics. Cambridge University Press. pp. 123–149.
- Cesarini Martinelli, Lucia. La filologia. Roma, Editori Riuniti, 1984.
- Clivio, Gianrenzo P.; Danesi, Marcel (2000). The Sounds, Forms, and Uses of Italian: An Introduction to Italian Linguistics. University of Toronto Press.
- Frank-Job, Barbara; Selig, Maria (2016). "Early evidence and sources". In Ledgeway, Adam; Maiden, Martin (eds.). The Oxford Guide to the Romance Languages. Oxford University Press. pp. 24–34.
- Giudice, Aldo; Bruni, Giovanni. Problemi e scrittori della lingua italiana. Torino, Paravia 1973, vols.
- Kabatek, Johannes (2013). "Koinés and scriptae". In Maiden, Martin; Smith, John Charles; Ledgeway, Adam (eds.). The Cambridge History of the Romance Languages. Vol. 2. Cambridge University Press. pp. 143–186.
- Ledgeway, Adam; Maiden, Martin (2022). "Data, Theory, and Explanation: The View from Romance". In Ledgeway, Adam; Maiden, Martin (eds.). The Cambridge Handbook of Romance Linguistics. Cambridge University Press. pp. 1–94.
- Lepschy, A. L.; Lepschy, G. (2009). "Italian". In Brown, Keith; Ogilvie, Sarah (eds.). Concise Encyclopedia of Languages of the World. Elsevier. pp. 545–549.
- Loporcaro, Michele (2018). Gender from Latin to Romance. Oxford university Press.
- Migliorini, Bruno, Storia della lingua italiana. Firenze, Sansoni, 1987.
- AA.VV. Il libro Garzanti della lingua italiana. Milano, Garzanti, 1969.
- Pescarini, Diego (2021). Romance Object Clitics: Microvariation and Linguistic Change. Oxford University Press. ISBN 978-0-19-886438-7. (first draft available on HAL open science)
- Stefanini, Ruggero (2004). "Indovinello Veronese". In Kleinhenz, Christopher (ed.). Medieval Italy: An Encyclopedia. Vol. 1. London/New York: Routledge. pp. 523–525.
- Vincent, Nigel (2016). "Continuity and change from Latin to Romance". In Adams, James; Vincent, Nigel (eds.). Early and Late Latin: Continuity or Change?. Cambridge University Press.
