= Seppe =

Seppe may refer to:

- Seppe Baetens (born 1989), Belgian volleyball player
- Seppe Van Holsbeke (born 1988), Belgian fencer
- Sebastian Seppe Smits (born 1991), Belgian snowboarder
- Bosschenhoofd, also known as Seppe, a village in the municipality of Halderberge, North Brabant, Netherlands
- Breda International Airport, originally named Seppe Airport, a small airport near Bosschenhoofd

== See also ==
- Sepp (disambiguation)
- Sep (disambiguation)
