= Verona Orational =

Visigothic prayer book

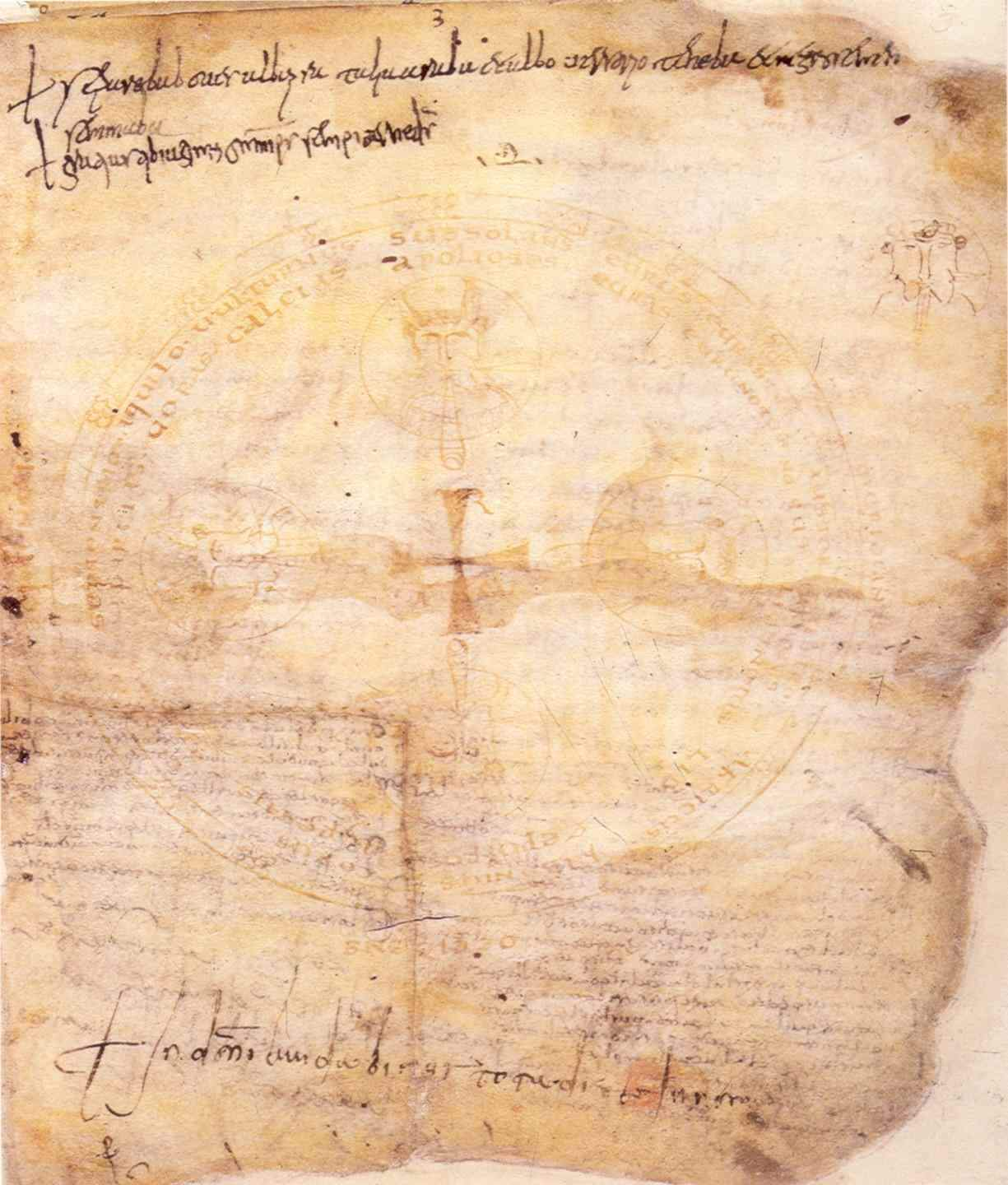
Rose of the Winds, folio 3r

The Verona Orational, also known as the Libellus Orationum (Verona, Cathedral, Biblioteca Capit. Cod. LXXXIX), is a late 7th or early 8th century Visigothic prayer book. It is the only liturgical book that was written before the Moorish invasion and is the only surviving Visigothic manuscript containing figural decoration. The manuscript has 127 folios that measure 330 mm by 260 mm. The text was written in Visigothic minuscule. A marginal gloss indicated that the manuscript was produced in Tarragona, at the church of Saint Fructuosus.

The orational contains antiphons and responsories that are not neumed; no music exists in the codex.

On folio 3r there is a drawing of the "Rose of the Winds", a precursor of the Compass rose. The drawing depicts the twelve winds grouped around a central cross. The twelve winds are represented by four heads with three faces each that have trumpets coming out of the mouth of each face. Each head is contained within a circle and the four circles are arranged in a cross pattern around the central cross. The entire drawing is enclosed within a double circle.

This manuscript is also important because it contains the first written sample of an early Italian language different from Late Latin, written in northern-Italian cursive minuscule and known as the "Veronese Riddle": "Se pareba boves, alba pratalia araba, albo versorio teneba, negro semen seminaba", which can be translated more or less as "In front of him (he) led oxen, White fields (he) plowed, A white plow (he) held, A black seed (he) sowed". This can be easily interpreted as a representation of the act of holding a pen and writing on a white sheet.
