= Sepp (given name) =

Sepp is a given name. When borne by Upper German-speaking people, it is often a nickname for Josef or other names related to Joseph.

Those bearing this name include:

- Joseph Sepp Blatter (born 1936), Swiss football administrator, former president of FIFA
- Josef Bradl (1918–1982), Austria ski jumper and coach
- Sepp Daxenberger (1962–2010), Bavarian politician
- Sepp De Roover (born 1984), Belgian footballer
- Josef Sepp Dietrich (1892–1966), World War II Oberst-Gruppenführer of the Waffen-SS
- Sepp Ferstl (born 1954), German alpine skier
- Josef "Sepp" Gangl, German major and Austrian resistance member who famously fought and died at the Battle of Castle Itter in the final days of World War II.
- Sepp Heckelmiller (born 1943), German former alpine skier
- Josef Sepp Herberger (1897–1977), German football player and manager
- Josef Hirtreiter (1909-1978), German SS sergeant and Holocaust war criminal
- Sepp Hochreiter (born 1967), German computer scientist
- Sepp Holzer (born 1942), Austrian permaculturalist and consultant for natural agriculture
- Josef Hügi (1930-1995), Swiss footballer
- Sepp Kerschbaumer (1913–1964), Italian terrorist
- Sepp Kuss (born 1994), American cyclist
- Sepp Kusstatscher (born 1947), Italian politician
- Sepp Lenz (1935–2023), West German luger
- Sepp Lichtenegger (born 1937), Austrian ski jumper
- Josef Sepp Maier (born 1944), German football goalkeeper
- Josef Oberhauser (1915–1979), German Nazi SS officer
- Josef Sepp Piontek (1940–2026), German football player and manager
- Josef Sepp Puschnig (born 1946), Austrian ice hockey player
- Sepp Reif (1937–2023), German ice hockey player
- Sepp Schönmetzler (born 1944), German figure skater, coach and journalist
- Sepp Straffner (1875–1952), Austrian federal railway official and politician
- Josef Uhlmann (1902–1968), German fencer, participated at the 1936 Summer Olympics
- Sepp van den Berg (born 2001), Dutch footballer
- Sepp Walcher (1954–1984), Austrian alpine skier
- Sepp Weiler (1921–1997), German ski jumper
- Sepp Weiß (born 1952), German footballer
- Sepp Wildgruber (born 1959), German alpine skier
- Josef Wurmheller (1917–1944), German Luftwaffe ace
- Josef Sepp Zeilbauer (born 1952), Austrian decathlete

== See also ==
- Sepp (surname)
- Sep (given name)
