= Chapter Library of Verona =

Library in Verona, Veneto, Italy

Coordinates: 45°26′48.61″N 10°59′48.55″E

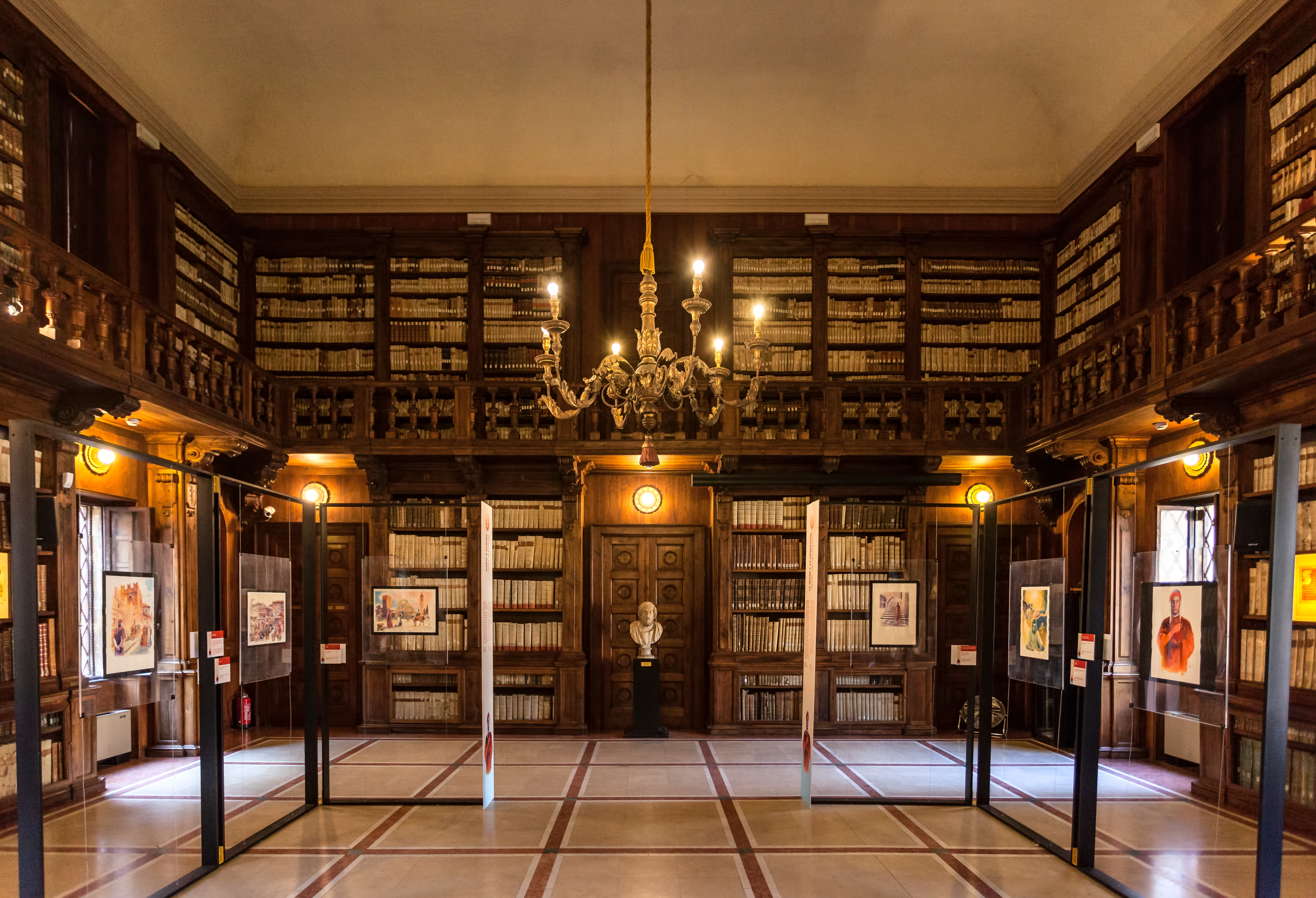
- The Chapter Library of Verona
- Location: Piazza Duomo, 13, 37122, Verona, Italy
- Established: 5th century CE

Collection
- Size: 106,000 volume, 16,000 item (2019), 12,000 item (2021), 89,300 item (2022), 1,315 item (2022), 1,283 item, 80,000 volume, 272 item

Other information
- Director: Bruno Fasani
- Website: www.bibliotecacapitolare.it

The Chapter Library of Verona (Italian: Biblioteca Capitolare di Verona) is an Italian library, considered one of the world's oldest libraries in continuous function.

== History ==
The Chapter Library of Verona is one of the oldest libraries in the world. Of the many metropolitan churches which formed collections of books for the use of the clergy in the two hundred years after Constantine's adoption of Christianity in 312, only Verona has a continuous history to the present. In the fifth century it was one of the few important cities of the Western Empire, the favourite residence of the Ostrogoth King Theodoric the Great, with a basilica whose grandeur can be reconstructed in imagination from the large surviving areas of mosaic pavement and the fragments (discovered in 1945) in the form of the Chi Rho (XP) monogram of the many bronze lamps that lit the interior. Almost certainly the cathedral already possessed a library and scriptorium, in which one or more of the five fifth-century codices it still owns were written. Besides two treatises by Saint Hilary of Poitiers, they include the sermons of Maximinus, the Arian bishop of Ravenna, with marginal notes in a Gothic script, evidently copied in a centre ruled by the Arian king of the Ostrogoths.

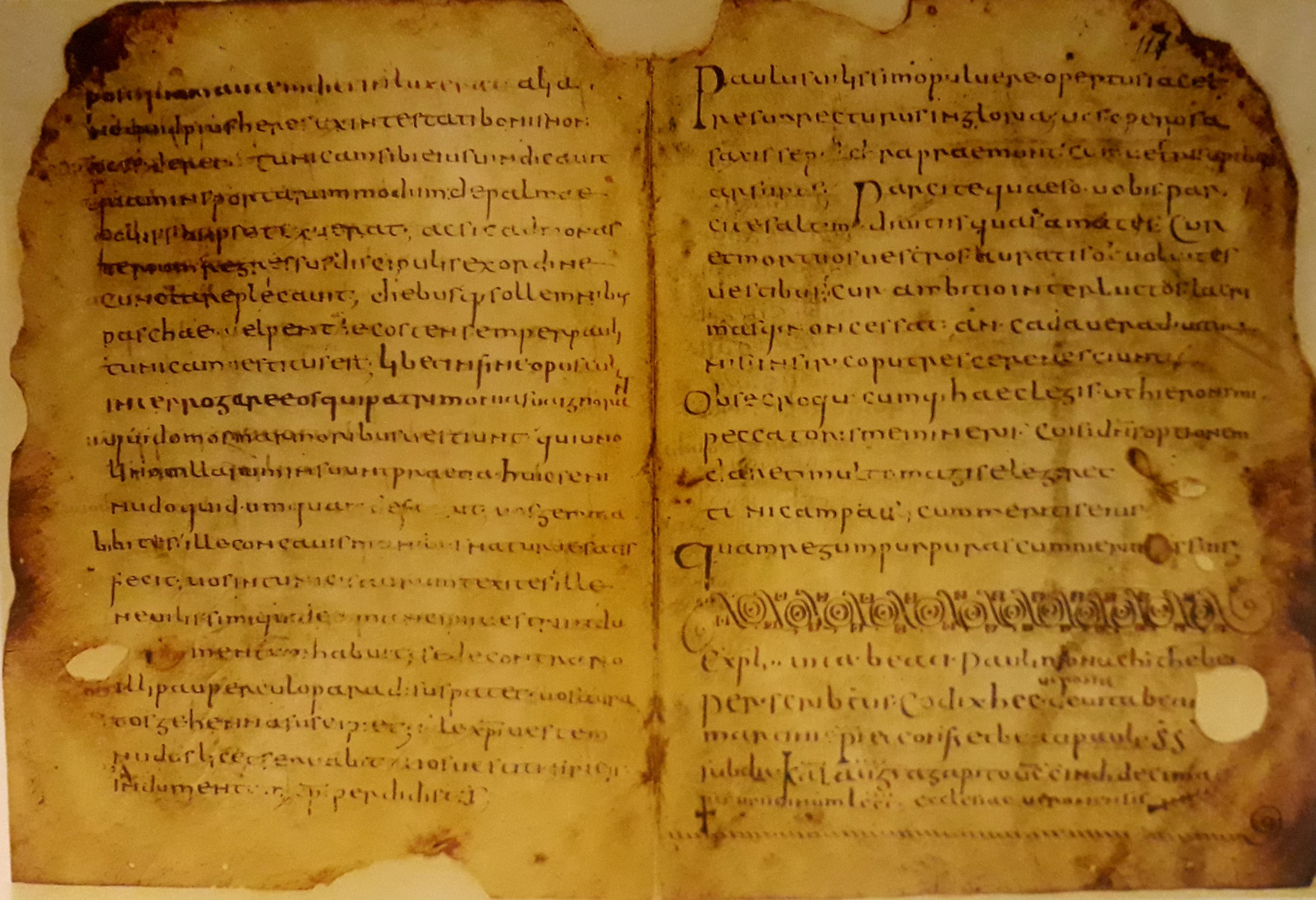
The Codex of Ursicinus, dated August 1, 517 CE

The scriptorium's earliest dated product is a little later: the Life of Saint Martin of Tours by his disciple, Sulpicius Severus, transcribed in 517, during the consulship of Agapitus, by Ursicinus, "Lector" (the second of the orders of priesthood) "of the church of Verona." Literary texts - histories in particular, but also the Younger Pliny's Letters and the poems of Tibullus and Catullus, the latter a native of Verona - entered the library at an early date and must have presented later scribes, especially in the seventh and eighth centuries when vellum was scarce and precious, with a constant temptation to wash off the earlier writing and re-use the material. But palimpsests, commonplace in the Bobbio scriptorium, were unusual, though not unknown, at Verona. A first-century legal textbook, the Institutes of Gaius, and the Elder Pliny's Natural History were both erased to make room for later works, the Letters and Commentary on Ecclesiasticus of Saint Jerome. In the eighth century, probably under Bishop Egino, a German from the abbey of Reichenau, new copies in pre-caroline minuscule were made of some uncial manuscripts; Claudian's poems and the anonymous collections of maxims known as the Distichs of Cato, still in the Capitolare, and Livy's Ab urbe condita, now lost. A collection of sermons now in the Berlin State Library was illustrated with miniatures - the earliest surviving example of book illustration from Verona - and a few volumes were acquired from abroad. Saint Gregory the Great's exposition of the Book of Job (Moralia in Job) had been copied in the Burgundian monastery of Luxeuil, and a Mozarabic breviary found its way from Spain, via Sardinia and Pisa, to Verona, where a scribe added a riddle in local dialect, "he divided the oxen, ploughed the white fields, held a white plough and sowed black seed" an allegory for writing evidently invented in the scriptorium.

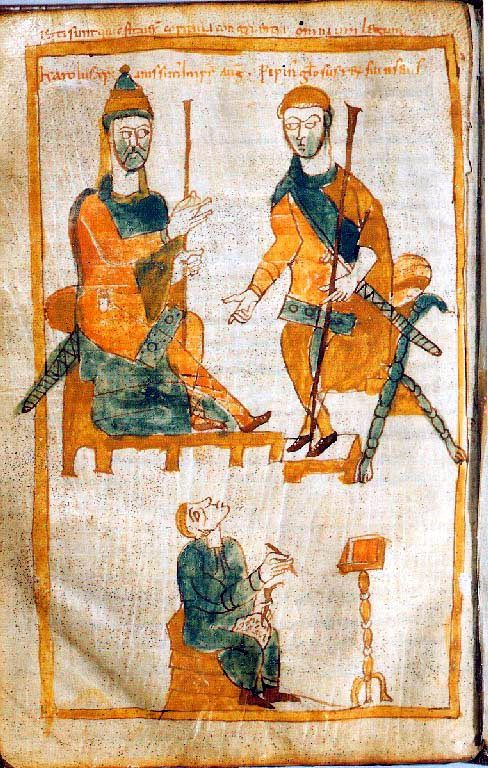
Charlemagne (left) and Pippin of Italy (right), in a 10th century illuminated manuscript from Fulda

In the early years of the ninth century, a time of relative peace and prosperity under Charlemagne's son, Pepin of Italy, the scriptorium was directed by one of those exceptionally able and energetic men whose careers have often been decisive in the transmission of a text or the history of a library, the Archdeacon Pacificus. He was born in 776, probably of a noble landowning family of Verona, and was educated at the Abbey of Reichenau. He was appointed archdeacon in 801. He evidently felt a deep loyalty to the schola sacerdotum, the corporation of cathedral clergy of which he was ex officio joint head, and obtained from the bishop a grant of property to pay their salaries as well as exemption from episcopal jurisdiction for the canons. When he died in 844, the residue of his substantial estate, after providing for a charitable inn and oratory and for annual gifts to the poor, was left to the schola.

Two years later the Canons erected a memorial tablet in the cathedral. This recorded that Pacificus had been "outstanding in wisdom and of conspicuous appearance: no such man has been known in our time, or we believe ever" - and listed his skills and achievements. Founder or restorer of seven churches: expert worker in gold, silver and other metals, marble and all kinds of wood: author of a commentary on the Old and New Testaments, and of "many other writings" (among them a manual on the computus and a topographical glossary of Verona); inventor of a night clock and of a poem attached to it (the latter has been tentatively identified: in two manuscripts it is illustrated by a drawing of an instrument shaped like a telescope, no doubt designed to tell the time from the position of the stars). Bis centenos terque senos codicesque fecerat - he "made" two hundred and eighteen manuscripts: the epitaph's claim, formerly regarded as poetic exaggeration, is now accepted as an exact statement of the scriptorium's output under Pacificus. He has been recognised as the scribe of almost a third of the twenty-seven ninth-century manuscripts remaining in Verona: many of the others contain his corrections and notes. They are written in the beautiful minuscule perfected by the Carolingian Renaissance: Pacificus seems to have taken a leading part in its propagation in Italy. He may have been trained at Reichenau and was certainly in touch with Northern scholars, Archbishop Hincmar of Rheims, to whom he sent the sermons of Verona's fourth-century bishop, Saint Zeno, and Rabanus Maurus, Abbot of Fulda, whose commentary on Judith and Esther was copied at Verona. Other aspects of his intellectual interests are revealed in an enquiry by a canon of the cathedral, forwarded by Pacificus to a German monk in a Brescian monastery, whether at the Day of Judgement Adam would be among the saved; and in a rather forced comparison of his own composition between the seven grades of the priesthood and episodes in the life of Jesus (e.g. "[Christ] was a lector when he opened the book of the Prophet Isaiah"). His favourite light reading, to judge from the frequency of his notes, was the early Christian "novel", the Clementine Recognitions, whose protagonists are Saint Peter, Clement, the first Pope, and Simon Magus; its stories from Greek mythology, intended to illustrate the immorality of the pagan pantheon, have been attentively studied.

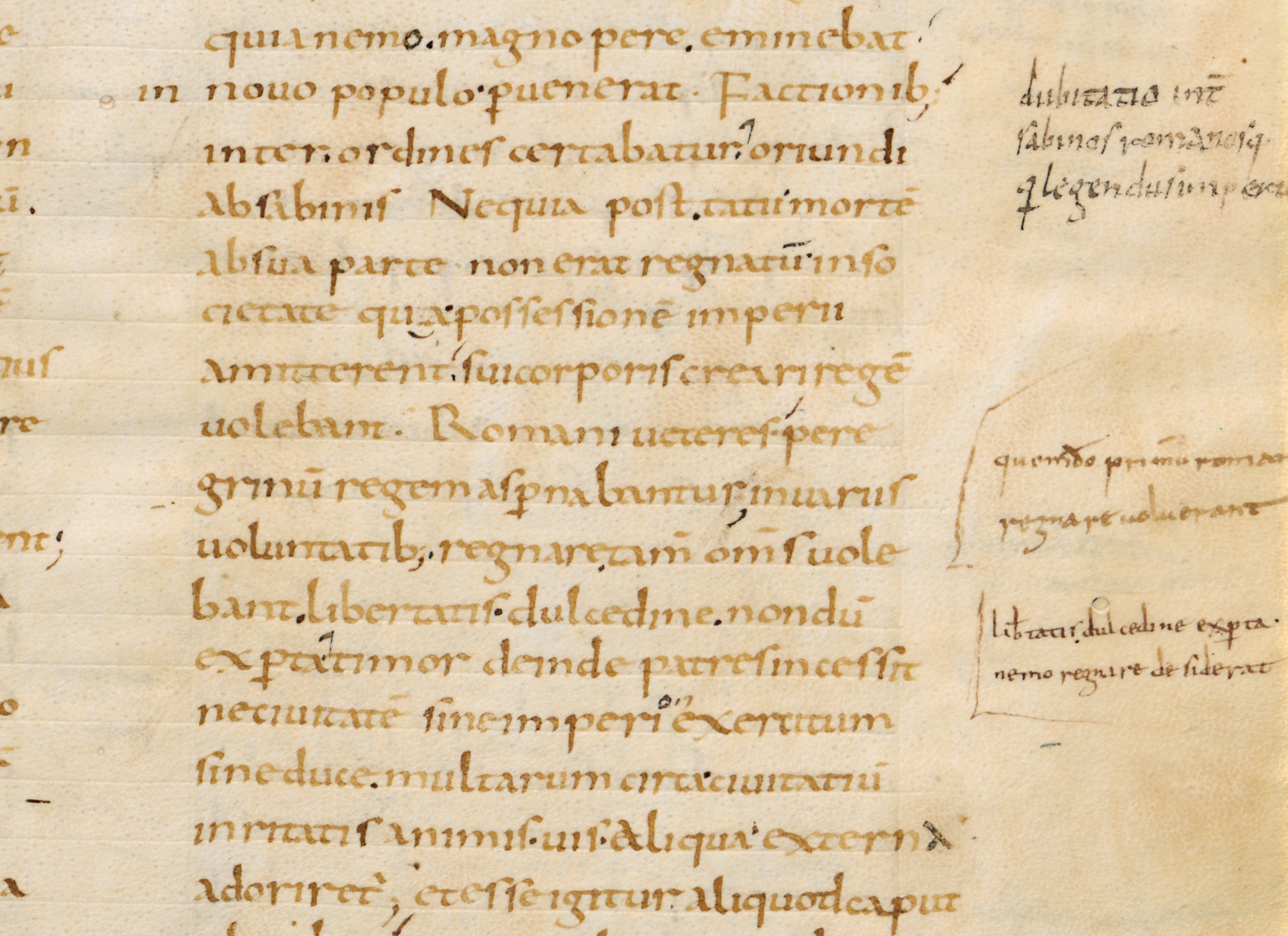
A 10th-century manuscript of Livy's Ab urbe condita with marginalia by Ratherius

Pacificus's renewal of the Verona Library, designed to provide the clergy and the cathedral school with necessary texts, biblical, liturgical, patristic and conciliar, did not completely exclude secular works. Transcripts were made both of a historical encyclopaedia (now divided between Berlin and Saint Petersburg) and of the collection of biographies of the Roman emperors known as the Scriptores Historiae Augustae. A century after his death the work was continued by Ratherius, the best scholar of the day, familiar with Plato's Timaeus, Horace, Terence and other classical authors. A Fleming, appointed bishop of Verona in 931 by Hugo of Provence, King of Italy, Ratherius was delighted by the standard of learning in his see, "another Athens for the multitude of its wise men", and numerous annotations show that he read his way carefully through the library. The anarchic conditions of tenth-century Italy (he was expelled from the diocese three times) prevented any comprehensive modernisation or enlargement of the collection as had been possible in the Carolingian era. But the scriptorium was still at the high level of competence it had attained under Pacificus, and under Ratherius' direction it completed at least one major enterprise, the preparation of two copies of the pre-caroline Livy. One remained in the cathedral to replace the eighth-century exemplar which in accordance with normal practice was destroyed after being copied. The other was presented to the Emperor and found its way to the cathedral of Worms: rediscovered by Beatus Rhenanus in the sixteenth century, it was used for the edition printed by Johann Froben at Basel in 1535.

Bishop Egino is thought to have taken some Verona books to Reichenau and Ratherius may have removed others. For the next three hundred years, though the collection continued to be replenished with new works, the early manuscripts were forgotten, until in the late thirteenth and early fourteenth century a school of rhetoric arose in Padua whose exponents started to explore the ancient libraries of the region. Their earliest discoveries were Seneca's Tragedies in the abbey of Pomposa and Ratherius' Livy at Verona. The unique manuscript of Catullus to have survived from antiquity, the source of all modern knowledge of his poems, was the next to attract attention; it was known to Benvenuto Campesani of Vicenza, and probably copied by him before 1323. In 1317 the French Dominican Bernard Gui, on a mission from the Pope to the ruler of Verona, Cangrande I della Scala, came upon the library's rich collection of early councils. Eleven years later a friend of Petrarch's father, ser Simone d'Arezzo, took up residence in the city as canon of the cathedral, and almost immediately occupied himself in transcribing the Livy. Petrarch was shown the transcript and entered its variant readings in his own copy, which in turn was used a century later by Lorenzo Valla for his influential work on the text, Emendationes in T. Livium. In 1339-41 Dante's son Pietro used the library to write his commentary on the Divine Comedy.

Petrarch himself first visited Verona in 1345, a fugitive from an outbreak of local warfare in Lombardy, and was overjoyed to find in the cathedral, and copy, Cicero's letters to Atticus, Brutus and Quintus, on which he modelled his own style in correspondence. In later years through his friendship with Guglielmo da Pastrengo, chancellor to Cansignorio della Scala, he was able to add to his personal library other works derived from the Capitolare: Varro's advice to farmers, the De re rustica (the author's only work to survive complete), the Eclogues of two minor poets, Calpurnius and Nemesianus, and the Scriptores Historiae Augustae, of which he first obtained a copy, in 1356, and later the ninth-century original.

These early humanists, who seem to have been allowed free access to the library, recovered its ancient texts just in time, as with the crumbling of the Scaliger dynasty's authority after 1375 the collection was extensively plundered. The Catullus, Varro and Cicero disappeared: the Livy was appropriated by Antonio da Legnago, one of the four regents for Cansignorio's infant sons; another regent, Giacomo da San Sebastiano, laid hands on an eleventh-century Orosius and an Augustine presented to the cathedral by Pacificus and bearing the archdeacon's solemn malediction on book-thieves. Other volumes passed into the possession of the victorious Visconti rulers of Milan and were eventually removed to Blois by King Louis XII of France with the rest of the Milanese ducal library from the castle of Pavia. The copy of Pliny's Epistulae was last seen by Guarino da Verona in 1419. Probably over four-fifths of the manuscripts present in Ratherius' day were lost before or soon after 1400. The chief event in the Capitolare's modern history was the construction of the first library building in 1728, as a consequence of renewed interest in the collection caused by an unlikely sequence of events. In 1630 the librarian, Canon Agostino Rezzani, hid the most ancient manuscripts to protect them from foreign troops gathering to attack Mantua. Soon afterwards he and eleven other members of the chapter succumbed to plague, taking the secret of the hiding-place with them to the grave. The early codices were forgotten and their existence denied when the French Maurist scholars, Bernard de Montfaucon and Jean Mabillon, visited Verona on their Italian journeys.

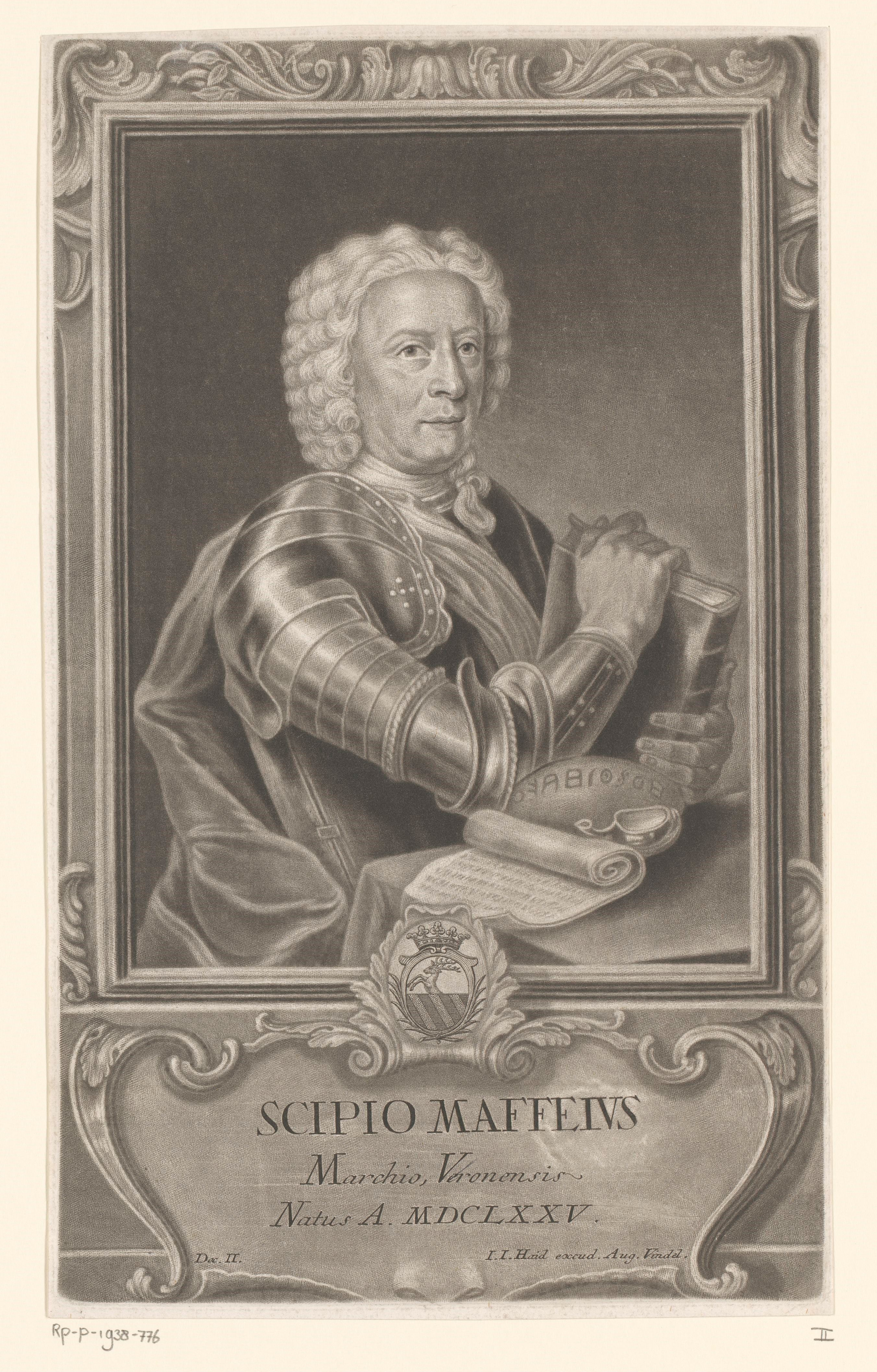
Portrait of Francesco Scipione Maffei

At last in 1713 the historian Francesco Scipione Maffei persuaded Canon Carinelli to lay aside temporarily his genealogical studies in order to search for the missing books. They were discovered in the hollow top of a cupboard outside the canons' common-room, concealed under layers of rags and boards. The news, carried instantly to Maffei, so excited him that he ran into the street dressed in dressing-gown, nightcap and slippers. Gifts and bequests poured into the library in the aftermath of this sensation: the collections of Monsignor Francesco Bianchini, antiquarian and astronomer and of Giovanni Morosini, Bishop of Verona; the manuscripts and papers of Francesco Scipione Maffei; Matthias Corvinus, King of Hungary's Livy, a present from the Bevilacqua family. Since the German historian, Barthold Niebuhr, discovered the submerged Institutes of Gaius in 1816 the collection has attracted the leading palaeographers of Europe and America. One of those to visit Verona was Léopold Victor Delisle, the great director of the Bibliothèque nationale de France. In a letter of 1885 to one of his colleagues in Paris, he wrote of "a day of debauch among manuscripts, few in number but of such venerable antiquity that I thought I was dreaming when I saw so many treasures assembled on a few shabby shelves."

War has dealt Verona two hard blows. On 16 May 1797, "the luckless day" in the words of a former librarian, the French commissioners, in pursuance of the national policy of removing Italian works of art to Paris, appropriated thirty manuscripts and fourteen incunables, not all of which were recovered after Waterloo. On 4 January 1945, a Liberator bomber out of formation and off course released its bombs on Verona. The library suffered a direct hit and was totally destroyed. The manuscripts, incunabula and archives had been removed to safety but many later printed books were lost. No time was lost in clearing the débris and starting to rebuild: a new library was inaugurated on 28 September 1948.

== Bibliography ==
- Hobson, Anthony (1970). Great Libraries. London: Weidenfeld and Nicolson.
- Giuliari, G.B. Carlo, La Capitolare biblioteca di Verona (1888), edited by Gian Paolo Marchi, Verona, Italy: s.n., 1993.
- Alberto Piazzi, ed. (1994). Biblioteca Capitolare, Verona. Florence: Nardini.
- Marchi, Gian Paolo (1996). "Breve discorso storico sulla Biblioteca Capitolare di Verona". In Silvia Marchi (ed.). I manoscritti della Biblioteca Capitolare di Verona: Catalogo descrittivo redatto da don Antonio Spagnolo. Verona: Mazziana.
- Zorzi, Marino (2001). "Capitular Library of Verona". In David H. Stam (ed.). International Dictionary of Library Histories. New York: Routledge. pp. 242–3. ISBN 978-1136777851.
