= Sepp (surname) =

Family name

Sepp is a surname. When borne by Estonian-descended people, it is usually derived from sepp meaning "smith".

Notable people with this surname include:

- The Sepp publishing family, four generations of printers and artists active in Amsterdam between 1768 and 1860
- Adeele Sepp, birth name of Adeele Jaago (born 1989), Estonian actress
- Andre Sepp (born 1971), Estonian politician
- Anna Maria Sepp (born 1996), Estonian sailor
- Boris Sepp (1894–1941), Estonian lawyer and politician
- Dennis Sepp (born 1973), Dutch footballer
- Evelyn Sepp (born 1972), Estonian sports figure and politician
- Heino Sepp (1936–2008), Estonian rally driver
- Heljo Sepp (1922–2015), Estonian Estonian pianist, music teacher
- Hendrik Sepp (1888–943), Estonian historian
- Jan Sepp (1778–1853), Dutch entomologist and artist
- Johan Sepp (1884–1953), Estonian politician
- Johann Nepomuk Sepp (1816–1909), German historian and politician
- Jüri Sepp (born 1952), Estonian economist
- Kalev Sepp, Estonian-American defense analyst
- Kätlin Sepp (born 1992), Estonian swimmer
- Kurt Sepp (born 1935), German ice hockey player
- Leo Sepp (1892–1941), Estonian financial figure, writer and politician
- Olav Sepp (born 1969), Estonian chess champion
- Ott Sepp (born 1982), Estonian actor
- Paul Sepp (1885–1943), Estonian theatre and film director and theatre teacher
- Sigrid Sepp (born 1998), Estonian swimmer
- Tõnu Sepp (born 1946), Estonian music teacher
- Uudo Sepp (born 1997), Estonian singer

== See also ==
- Seppä, a Finnish surname with the same meaning (smith).
- Sepp (given name)
