= Septimus =

Septimus or Septimius may refer to:

== People ==
=== Ancient Rome ===
- Septimus (praenomen), a praenomen or Roman personal name
- Septimia gens, an ancient Roman family
- Lucius Septimius (died 48 BC), one of the assassins of Pompey the Great
- Septimius Severus, Roman general and emperor from AD 193 to 211
- L. Septimius Bassianus, better known as Caracalla, the elder son of Septimius Severus, emperor from 198 to 217
- P. Septimius Geta, the younger son of Septimius Severus, emperor from 209 to 211
- Septimius (usurper), a usurper proclaimed emperor in 271 during the reign of Aurelian
- St Septimus (died 303), martyred with SS Felix, Januarius, Fortunatus, and Audactus
- Septimius Acindynus, consul in 340
- Lucius Septimius (Roman governor), 4th century governor of Britannia Prima
- Q. Septimius Florens Tertullianus (c. 155–c. 240 AD), better known as Tertullian, theologian
- St Septimius of Iesi (died 307), bishop and saint

=== Palmyrene Empire ===
- Septimius Odaenathus (died 267), first Palmyrene king
- Septimius Antiochus (died after 273), last Palmyrene emperor
- Septimius Worod, 3rd century Palmyrene viceroy
- Septimius Zabdas (died c. 273), commander of the Palmyrene armies

=== Modern world ===
- Septimus Aspinall (1907–1976), English rugby league footballer of the 1920s and 1930s
- Septimus Atterbury (1880–1964), English football player
- Septimus Francom (1882–1965), British long-distance runner
- Septimus J. Hanna, American Civil War veteran and a judge in the Old West
- Septimus Holmes Godson (1799–1877), British barrister
- Septimus Kaikai, Sierra Leonean politician and broadcaster
- Septimus Kinneir (1871–1928), English cricketer
- Sep Lambert, Irish cricketer
- Septimus Norris, (1818–1862) American mechanical engineer and steam locomotive designer
- Septimus Ridsdale (1840–1884), English first-class cricketer
- Septimus Robinson (1710–1765), British Army officer
- Septimus Rutherford (1907–1975), English footballer
- Septimus Edwin Scott, (1879–1965), English painter
- Septimus Winner, (1827-1902), American songwriter
- Septimus Warwick (1881–1953), British architect

== Fictional characters ==
- the title character of Septimus Bean and His Amazing Machine, a children's book
- Septimus Dix, the title character of the novel Septimus, by William John Locke
- Septimus Harding, the eponymous protagonist of Anthony Trollope's novel The Warden
- the title protagonist of Septimus Heap, a series of books by Angie Sage
- Septimus Hodge, in Tom Stoppard's play Arcadia
- Doctor Septimus Pretorius, in the 1935 film Bride of Frankenstein
- Septimus Warren Smith, in Virginia Woolf's novel Mrs Dalloway
- Septimus (Stardust), in Neil Gaiman's novel Stardust
- Major Septimus Pyecroft, in Sharpe's Mission, the eleventh episode of the Sharpe series.

== Other uses ==
- Septimus (horse)

== See also ==
- Septimania, historical region in modern-day France
