= Felix and Adauctus =

Roman-era Christian martyrs

Saints Felix and Adauctus
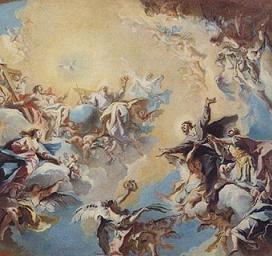
- The Glorification of St Felix and St Adauctus. Carlo Innocenzo Carlone.

Martyrs
- Died: 303; Rome
- Venerated in: Catholic Church; Eastern Orthodox Church
- Canonized: Pre-Congregation
- Major shrine: St Stephen's Cathedral, Vienna
- Feast: 30 August
- Attributes: Adauctus is sometimes portrayed as a Roman legionary or soldier

Felix and Adauctus (d. 303) were, according to tradition, Christian martyrs who were said to have suffered during the Great Persecution during the reign of the Roman emperor Diocletian.

The Acts, first published in Ado's Martyrology, relate as follows: Felix, a Roman priest, and brother of another priest, also named Felix, being ordered to offer sacrifice to the gods, was brought by the prefect Dracus to the temples of Serapis, Mercury, and Diana. But at the prayer of the saint the idols fell shattered to the ground. He was then led to execution. On the way an unknown person joined him, professed himself a Christian, and was also killed. The Christians gave him the name Adauctus (the Latin word for "added"). They were both beheaded.

These Acts are considered a legendary embellishment of a misunderstood inscription by Pope Damasus. A Dracus cannot be found among the prefects of Rome; the other Felix of the legend is St. Felix of Nola; and Felix of Monte Pincio is the same Felix honoured on the Garden Hill. The brother is imaginary (Anal. Boll., XVI, 19-29).

== Veneration ==
Their veneration is very old; they are commemorated in the Sacramentary of Gregory the Great and in the ancient martyrologies.

Their church in Rome, built over their graves, in the catacomb of Commodilla, on the Via Ostiensis, near the Basilica of Saint Paul Outside the Walls, and restored by Pope Leo III, was discovered about three hundred years ago and again unearthed in 1905 (Civiltà Catt., 1905, II, 608). Pope Leo IV, about 850, is said to have given their relics to Irmengard, wife of Lothair I; she placed them in the abbey of canonesses at Eschau in Alsace.

They were brought to the church of St. Stephen in Vienna in 1361. The heads are claimed by Anjou and Cologne. According to the "Chronicle of Andechs" (Donauwörth, 666877, p. 69), Henry, the last count, received the relics from Pope Honorius III and brought them to the Abbey of Andechs.

The painter Carlo Innocenzo Carlone (1686–1775) painted The Glorification of Saints Felix and Adauctus (1759–61), seen above. It was commissioned for the cupola of the church of San Felice del Benaco on Lake Garda.
