= Simultaneous communication =

Speaking and using manual communication at the same time

Simultaneous communication, SimCom, or sign supported speech (SSS) is a technique sometimes used by deaf, hard-of-hearing or hearing sign language users in which both a spoken language and a manual variant of that language (such as English and manually coded English) are used simultaneously.

While the idea of communicating using two modes of language seems ideal in a hearing/deaf setting, in practice the two languages are rarely relayed perfectly. Often the native language of the user (usually spoken language for the hearing person and sign language for the deaf person) is the language that is strongest, while the non-native language degrades in clarity.

In an educational environment this is particularly difficult for deaf children as a majority of teachers who teach the deaf are hearing. Results from surveys in 1986 indicate that school professionals used signing with approximately 2/3rds of the population of deaf students, and that this signing is described by researchers in 1987 as "English-like".

Simultaneous Communication by hearing signers is criticized in the Deaf community because of the degradation of sign quality. It is believed that SimCom is performed for the benefit of a hearing audience and at the expense of the Deaf audience. As such, Deaf teachers often discourage the use of SimCom to their students.

== History/overview ==
Manual communication has existed as a major philosophy of Deaf education since the founding of the first formal Western school for the deaf in France by Charles-Michel de l'Épée in 1755, but Simultaneous Communication strategies gained mainstream traction in the United States in the 1970s. The history of using some form of sign language in the formal education of Deaf children, known as Manualism, has been a tumultuous one. In 1880, the Conference of Milan issued resolutions against both sign languages overall, and the use of simultaneous communication:

1. The Convention, considering the incontestable superiority of speech over signs, (1) for restoring deaf-mutes to social life, (2) for giving them greater facility of language, declares that the method of articulation should have the preference over that of signs in the instruction and education of the deaf and dumb. 2. Considering that the simultaneous use of signs and speech has the disadvantage of injuring speech and lip-reading and precision of ideas, the Convention declares that the pure oral method ought to be preferred.

The Milan resolutions were widely adopted by Western educational systems, especially in the United States, for much of the subsequent century. Schools for the deaf in the United States fired deaf teachers of the deaf (contributing to the overwhelming majority of hearing teachers of the deaf with significantly limited sign language training or experience) and banned the use of sign language in classrooms, including the use of corporal punishment for deaf students who used sign language with each other.

Following the failure of pure oralism to meet the needs of the deaf education system and its students, a number of philosophies to re-introduce manual communication in some form became prominent in the United States in the 1970s. The rise of SimCom is associated with the language planning movement in the United States towards the use of manually coded language, specifically manually coded English, which heavily modified existing ASL lexical items so that they could be matched to, and theoretically co-articulated with, spoken English utterances. SimCom was a major feature of Total communication, which was a collection of educational strategies and philosophies dedicated to integrating as many possible communication strategies in order accommodate students needing manual communication while continuing to emphasize spoken language.

While SimCom remains a strategy used by a variety of people in a number of different environments, the Total Communication (TC) approach in education has increasingly given way in modern Deaf education to the bilingual–bicultural education (Bi-Bi) approach, which frequently involves the instruction of English as a second language, affirming a Deaf student's ability to benefit from learning a sign language natively while continuing to encourage English acquisition without making established English fluency a pre-requisite for accessing content area education and socialization with peers.

== Studies/research ==
=== Proposed Advantages ===
According to a study done in 1984, it was found that compared with haphazard instruction involving no language approach whatsoever, Total Communication was proved to be beneficial when combined with the correct approach.

One study entitled "Intelligibility of speech produced during simultaneous communication", 12 hearing impaired individuals were asked to audit the audio samples of 4 hearing sign language experts who had produced recordings of a Simultaneous Communication (SC) sample and a Speech Alone (SA) sample. The 12 hearing impaired individuals were asked to then determine which speech produced was clearer. After listening to both audio samples, hearing impaired listeners agreed that both SC and SA were intelligible, which is supported by previous research. Since the intelligibility of the speech was kept on par with English grammar, the study results indicate that SC is a positive tool to use with Deaf and Hard of Hearing children as a language model and for Deaf/Hard of Hearing adults to keep using.

Another study showed the difference between a control group, families who participated in an intervention program that offered services such as classes on Total Communication, private teachers for the child and a deaf adult who came to the families house, and another group of families who used TC, but did not have as much intervention as the control group. The results showed that intervention did work, and that it positively correlated with the communication skills show by the control group's children. The children showed advanced cognitive skills, including comprehension and expression, specifically related to time.

=== Proposed Disadvantages ===
A study done in 1990 titled "The Effectiveness of Three Means of Communication in the College Classroom" by Dennis Cokely reviewed research done previously that supported the use of Total Communication (SimCom) in the classroom. However, the study pointed out several restrictive factors that several research tests had not approached. One of the tests administered only compared SimCom, the Rochester Method and speech reading with voice (lip reading), omitting the option of ASL as a means of communication. The 1990 study addressed this issue by comparing SimCom, Sign Alone and Interpretation to see which was the most effective. The results from the comparison showed that signing alone as a way for students to understand information given was the most effective and SimCom was the least effective. Overall, Sign Alone and Interpretation was most effective in all areas of the test, proving that SimCom was a struggle for teachers and students alike. When working with two separate modes of communication, the one that comes naturally for the user will be the more prominent mode. A study conducted in 1998 showed that signing and speaking at the same time results in a slower approach to instruction than if just one modality was used to express language.

== Methods of Total Communication ==
Listed below are the signed communications that are used within SimCom. Since SimCom can use any spoken language, mainly English, combined with any signed mode, all communication listed below are available for use.

- American Sign Language
- Signing Exact English
- Cued speech
- Contact sign (Pidgin Sign)
- Total Communication
- Bimodal bilingualism

== See also ==
- Key word signing
