= Deaf education in Kenya =

Deaf Education in Kenya is a constantly changing section of the Kenyan education system that is focused on educating deaf, hard-of-hearing, and hearing-impaired Kenyan students. There are many organizations in Kenya made to protect the rights of Deaf Kenyans and promote progress in deaf education. The state of Kenyan deaf education is constantly changing and improving.

== Deaf Sign Language Use in Kenya ==
=== Kenyan Sign Language ===
Kenyan Sign Language (KSL) is the language used by the deaf community of Kenya, the population of which is estimated to be 600,000. With a population of around 340,000 speakers (based on a 2007 consensus), KSL acts as the primary mode of communication for over half of the deaf population. There are two known dialects- Kisumu in western Kenya and Mombasa in eastern Kenya.

Like other sign languages, KSL evolved largely through the social interactions of the deaf. Vocabulary is enriched and constantly changing through the movement of unique signs originating in remote areas to other schools or communities. These regional differences can create dialects, just as in oral languages. Kenya, being a culturally diverse country, has around 42 ethnic groups and their local sign languages provided the basis for KSL and allow for its continued diversification.

The first dictionary for an African Sign Language was written in Kenya in 1988 by Rothenborg-Jensen and Yego on Kenyan Sign Language.

==== Kenyan Sign Language Family ====
KSL may has connections to American Sign Language (ASL) and British Sign Language (BSL), and the manual alphabet is largely (omit) based on that of the American Sign Language, though the British one was used previously and still used in a Mombasa school. KSL has been largely influenced by ASL since the inception of formal education. Many Kenyan schools for the deaf were founded by churches such as the Presbyterian Church of East Africa and Catholic Church and were later influenced by deaf leaders such as Prof. Michael Ndurumo, who advocated the use of sign language and the manual alphabet, as well as many interpreters and volunteers associated with them. The origin of many of the interpreter training programmes were influences by organizations associated with ASL-use, such as the Peace Corps in the foundation of the Kenyan Sign Language Interpreters Association (KSLIA).

The KSL used to teach in schools may not be considered authentic KSL due to the substantial amount of ASL influence.

Kenyan Sign Language is the basis for Somali Sign Language. This is due to the fact that the first school for the deaf in Somalia along with its three teachers came from Annalena Tonelli’s Kenyan school for the deaf in Wajir.

Though KSL is largely unrelated to other languages, but has similarities with Ugandan and Tanzanian sign languages. Nonetheless, Ugandan and Tanzanian deaf cannot often understand KSL very well. However, many deaf Ugandans know KSL due to the fact that they often travel to Kenya for secondary education.

=== Legal Recognition ===
Kenya's official languages are English and Kiswahili, though KSLI is making efforts to give Kenyan Sign Language and Braille official status as well. While not Kenya's official languages, Braille and KSL are mentioned in the 2009 Constitution, Article 7, in which it is stated that the State will protect these two Kenyan languages along with Kenya's indigenous languages.

=== KSL Use in Kenya ===
The government of Kenya uses Kenya Signed English, which is parallel to American Signed Exact English, in which the sign language does not have its own grammar and follows English grammar. Kenya Signed English is also used in all schools under the Kenya Institute of Education. KSL, on the other hand, is backed by the University of Nairobi. It is used at Nyangoma and Mumias, both of which are primary schools for the deaf in western Kenya. There is a noted negativity towards KSL on behalf of special education teachers. Some schools are known to use other sign languages, including a Mombasa school uses British Sign Language. A more in-depth look into the use of KSL and SEE in Kenyan schools is presented in the next section.

== Kenyan Educational Structure and the Incorporation of Deaf Education ==
In Kenya, deaf education makes up part of the ministry of education under the special education division. The Educational Assessment and Resource Services (EARS) also plays a role in assisting deaf education opportunities. It hosts an Educational Assessment and Resource Centre (EARC) in every Kenyan district. Before a deaf child is entered into a school, he is assessed at his local EARC.

=== History of Deaf Education in Kenya ===
==== Establishment of Deaf Schools and the Use of KSL ====
Historically, many changes have been made to the policies in Kenya regarding language of instruction in deaf schools. Starting in the 1800s, missionaries from Europe began establishing schools for the deaf. However, these schools catered to the wealthier population and excluded poor families from the specialized education. At the time, there was a strong emphasis on the oral communication, lip reading, speech therapy, and hearing aids.

For quite a while, some publications and speakers have attributed and linked establishment of schools for the deaf in Kenya to Dr. Andrew Jackson Foster. Dr. Foster did not establish any schools or churches for the deaf in Kenya. Dr. Foster's work was mainly concentrated in West Africa.

In Kenya, Schools for the deaf were started by religious bodies, both Christian and Muslim.. The first school for the deaf in Kenya was Aga Khan in Mombasa started in 1958. Mumias School for the Deaf and Nyangoma School for the deaf were both established by the Catholic church in 1961, followed by Kambui School for the Deaf which was started by the Presbyterian Church of East Africa (PCEA) in 1963. There then followed a number of schools established by churches, these included Tumu Tumu School for the Deaf in 1970 established by the PCEA, the Methodist Church also started Kaaga School for the Deaf, and the Anglican Church started Maseno School for the Deaf. Another school for the deaf - Kapsabet School for the Deaf was started by the African Inland Church. All these were pioneer schools by their respective churches long before Andrew Foster visited Kenya for the first time in the 1980s while on transit to Nigeria. Moreover, schools for the deaf in Kenya started using sign language when it was introduced to schools by Prof Michael Ndurumo in the early 1980s.

Other important facts to note are that the Kenya Society for Deaf Children (KSDC) was registered in 1958. Indeed, Prof Michael Ndurumo who later became instrumental in deaf education in Kenya was one of KSDC's first students at Dagoreti Children's Centre in 1961 to 1963. Other pioneer deaf students in Kenya include Santina Mwarania, Rosemary Aloo, Scholastica Majuma, Solomon Kayia, Florence Baseke (from Uganda), and Elkana Kimutai who were among the first batch of students at Mumias School for the Deaf; and Mr. Patrick Hagoi, Rev Daniel Njihia, and Rev Joseph Ondiek who were among the first students at Nyangoma School for the Deaf. Most of there pioneer students would later become very influential leaders of the deaf in many spheres of life in Kenya.

Simultaneous communication, or sign supported speech, started to be used in 1986 and is still present. Simultaneous communication (SimCom) involves using both oral and manual coded languages- in this case English and Signed Exact English. While in theory this method is effective, in practice it can become very confusing. Nonetheless, it is claimed that this communication mode has resulted in academic progress.

One of the first instances of deaf education that used sign language as opposed to the oral method of the missionary schools starts with the inception of the Kenya Society for Deaf Children (KSDC) in 1958, which went on to build the first two schools made specifically for the deaf- Nyangoma and Mumias. Both primary schools were built in west Kenya by 1961. Secondary schools were built as the number of students attending has drastically increased. According to KSDC's statistics, 1,710 students attended schools for the deaf in 1982, and by 2001 there were 6,000 students. There were reported 23 deaf schools were built from 1960-1980. However, even accounting for the impressive movement, it is estimated that around 30% of all deaf children in Kenya still do not go to school.

Prof. Michael Ndurumo is a deaf Kenyan educated in the United States who advocated the use of SEE in 1985 while working for the Kenya Institute of Education (KIE). He was a supporter of the use of sign language in classrooms. This led to the Ministry of Education's formation of Machakos School for the Deaf where Ndurumo incorporated the ASL manual alphabet and the total communication method. Total communication is a mixture of oralism and manualism, and incorporates the use of the individual's specific vocabulary, sign language, fingerspelling, speech and lip reading, manually coded language and other forms of communication to teach at an individual level for students.

A 1988 study conducted by the Ministry of Education showed that using total communication as a teaching method enabled faster learning and was more effective for cognitive growth when incorporated at earlier ages than later ages. After this study, the Kenyan government promoted the use of sign language and, more specifically, SEE alongside total communication in deaf schools and classrooms.

=== The Structure of Deaf Education in Kenya ===
==== Language Instruction Policy ====
As one of Kenya's two official languages, high importance is placed on English in the Kenyan school system. Since the Gachathi Report took effect in 1976 and reformed Kenya's school system, all Kenyan schools teach Kenyan school children to read and write English from pre-school until Standard 3. Starting in Standard 4, students are taught solely in English, with the exception of Kiswahili classes or other language classes. All national examinations in Kenya are written and conducted in English. These examinations are instrumental to students’ futures, as they determine what class level the student will be placed in, acceptance into college programmes, and even obtaining jobs. The only accommodations provided for deaf students is a 30-minute extension during their exam. Kenyan universities do not provide interpreters for their deaf students. Due to the heavy emphasis placed on English skills, efforts to maximise deaf students’ exposure to English have ensued in the hopes that it will better prepare them for their examinations and subsequently ensure better futures and job opportunities. This centrality of English in Kenya is one major motive behind the implementation of inclusive education in Kenyan schools.

==== English Language in the Kenyan School System and its Effects on the Use of KSL ====
Schoolchildren must become proficient in English because of the emphasis on it in Kenyan education and examinations, meaning thorough knowledge of English grammar is essential. Since Kenyan Sign Language holds its own grammar, deaf students taught in KSL are considered to be at a disadvantage.

As an attempt to incorporate more exposure to English into deaf education, aid these students to become proficient in English grammar, and make learning to read and write in English more feasible, suggestions have been made to enforce the use of Signed Exact English. Signed Exact English (SEE) uses the sentence structure of English with the visual signs of sign language. It is a manually coded language, also called a signed oral language, and thus is not a “natural language” due to the fact that it did not evolve naturally within a human population and instead was assembled by merging aspects of oral and sign languages. Signed Exact English is not considered its own language since it does not have a distinct grammatical structure; it is instead considered a manual sign system.

SEE, however, does not take into account many subtle aspects of sign language, such as changes in facial expressions that affect meaning. Use of SEE can also stunt the development and use of KSL. Studies of SimComm and sign bilingualism show that the use of both oral communication and manually coded communication improves comprehension and understanding but can stunt the teacher's linguistic complexity, making their language use simpler. When asked, many students preferred learning through KSL instead of SEE (or ASL) and stated that using both sign language and speech together was confusing. However, teachers are not as proficient in KSL.

Kiswahili is a compulsory subject in Kenyan schools, yet due to low results from deaf students there has been thought to replace it with teaching KSL, with the Kenya Society for Deaf Children (KSDC) on the forefront of the proposal. In fact, KSL is now an option for deaf students in some schools, though there is a lack of textbooks to facilitate the teaching of KSL as a subject.

=== Various Strategies in Deaf Education ===
Historically, many students, especially those with special needs such as the deaf, have been excluded from schools, particularly in developing countries. However, there are now multiple approaches to deaf education that are present in Kenya as well as the rest of the world. There is considerable controversy surrounding which may be considered the best course of action, as they all have positive and negative aspects. Some of these strategies are:

- Inclusion, in which deaf (and other special needs students) learn alongside hearing students. The structure of the class and the mode of teaching change to accommodate the special needs students.
- Integration, in which deaf students learn alongside hearing students. While similar to inclusion, special education kids are taught to adapt to the class rather than changing the structure of the class as a whole.
- Mainstreaming, in which deaf students learn with hearing students for part of the day, depending on their academic level, but part of the day is spent in special education classes. This allows for individualized attention along with social interaction with mainstream students.
- Segregation, in which special needs students are taught separately from other students, or in entirely separate special schools.

==== Integration and Inclusive Education in Kenya ====
===== Integration in Kenyan Schools =====
The instigation of integration into the Kenyan education system can be traced back to Britain due to the fact that most Kenyan developers of special education were trained in Britain, where integration was endorsed in 1981. Upon their return, policies were set into motion regarding the assimilation of deaf and other special education students into mainstream schools- though these students were still given particular attention. Because of the emphasis on normalization, deaf students were taught speech development, often compromising their exposure to other subjects. Despite the years that integration had been incorporated in the educational system, the rate of academic improvement has yet to reach expectations. There is a general negativity and disregard to the policy structures along with a lack of enforcement. Thus, the current suggestion to better deaf education is to embrace inclusive education.

===== The Rise of Inclusive Education =====
Though the concept of inclusive education is not very new, its implementation by Kenyan educators is. Strategies toward inclusion started when the University of Cambridge Faculty of Education, Kenyatta University, and the Kenyan Ministry of Education Science and Technology's special education section initiated a link programme in 2001 dedicated to educational inclusion. This initiated a widespread effort to promote inclusion in the country's deaf schools in hopes that it would better prepare deaf students for the English-based Kenyan educational and examination systems. Presently, the Kenyan government is incorporating inclusion into the policy of its educational system. Projections show that there will be a minimum of one special needs teacher in every institution by 2015. The United Kingdom’s Cheshire International is supporting western Kenya’s Oriang Inclusive Project- the only inclusive programme for public schools. The Project currently manages five regular schools. Assessments of academic improvement on behalf of the Project are yet to ensue.

====== Controversies Surrounding Inclusive Education ======
Inclusion is one of the many methods to approaching the education of deaf and hard-of-hearing students throughout the world and is considered by many the best approach. However, due to the linguistic barrier, the inclusion of students with hearing impairments into mainstream schools can have a significant negative effect on academic achievement if proper support and special attention is not sufficiently provided. The approach of inclusive education rejects the use of special schools or the separation of special needs students from the main student body. Since special schools are designed specifically to target the needs of a specific group of students, denying the separation of these students can sacrifice the quality of the education that’s needed to support certain students and keep them on track with the educational system. Additionally, merging these students with their mainstream counterparts can put them at considerable disadvantage when it comes to the competing for these facilities as well as the attention and guidance of their instructors.

Imposing inclusive education in developing countries such as Kenya ignores how issues such as insufficient funding, inadequate teacher training, large numbers of students in classrooms, and inflexible school systems may affect the effectiveness of these students’ education.

Studies show that parents of deaf students prefer to send their children to special schools under the assumption that they will receive better, specialized education, interact with other hearing-impaired students, and use a common language.

==== Lack of Educators ====
Deaf education teachers all hold either a (1) Diploma in Special Needs Education received from the Kenya Institute of Special Education (KISE) or (2) Degree in Special Needs Education received from Kenyatta or Maseno University. Because of the shortage in qualified teachers, some do not hold either of these qualifications. These teachers are trained in general education but generally have no received special education training.

== Kenyan Sign Language Organizations ==
Both the KSLIA and the KNAD are dedicated to protecting Deaf rights and education in Kenya.

=== Kenyan Sign Language Interpreters Association ===
The Kenyan Sign Language Interpreters Association (KSLIA) is an organisation that supports the creation and advancement of interpreter training and certification programmes. The KSLIA Official Blog envisions a “three-pronged approach” that includes the three C's:

1. Certification of members
2. Continuing education for the practicing interpreters
3. Conflict resolution through enforcement of the Code of Ethics

==== Formation of the KSLIA ====
The Peace Corps programme had a strong need for trained interpreters for the pre-service training programme. The interpreters were needed to allow Deaf volunteers communication with the instructors. When it was evident that trained interpreters in Kenya were scarce, the Peace Corps supported a couple interpreters from the United States to work with local interpreters to be able to provide better future interpreter services to Deaf volunteers. There was a strong group of Deaf volunteers in 1999 who actively supported the allocation of funds to strengthen support for local interpreters. A one-week-long workshop was funded as a result of these volunteers’ lobbying. 15 interpreters attended the workshop which was held in September 2000. Kenyan interpreters were encouraged to start an association during this week-long workshop. The association was to be responsible for:

1. Becoming a way for interpreters to socially interact
2. Enforcing a mutually agreed-upon code of ethics and correcting interpreters
3. Acting as a medium for progress through peer education

For the following couple of months, assemblies were held to form a constitution and code of ethics, and a list of trained interpreters throughout the country was created. This one-week programme is accredited with instigating what the “Kenyan Interpreter community” came to know as the Navisha Declaration. The Kenyan Sign Language Association adopted the Navisha Declaration's objectives as its own once it became officially registered under the Societies Act in December 2000.

==== Navisha Declaration ====
The KSLI blog states the Navisha Declaration to be:

We the Kenyan Interpreters practicing in various fields agree to:

a) To secure official recognition by the Government of Interpreters profession
b) Encourage and promote initiatives in improving the standards of SL interpreting and interpreter training and pay scale of interpreters depending with their level and skills of interpretation through certification.
c) Cooperation with other recognized bodies concerned in the welfare of the deaf and in provision of Interpreters throughout the world.

d) Awareness creation on Deafness and SL. Interpreters through publication of information materials

e) To collect and raise funds for the achievement of goals and objectives through membership fee, subscription, contribution, gifts or donations, commissions and payments, fund raising whether in money or otherwise from both members and non-members.

f) To maintain and administer a register of S.L Interpreters in Kenya.”

=== Kenyan National Association of the Deaf (KNAD) ===
The Kenyan National Association of the Deaf is a Kenyan national non-governmental organisation that was founded and is run by Deaf Kenyans. KNAD was formed in 1987 through the Societies Act. KNAD cooperates with international NGOs and the Kenyan government regarding issues about deaf Kenyans. KNAD promotes human rights for the deaf and strives to offer research and training in sign language and sign language interpreting. It is also a member of the World Federation of the Deaf.

== Important Figures in Kenyan Deaf Education ==
=== Annalena Tonelli ===
Annalena Tonelli was a Roman Catholic volunteer who worked in eastern Africa for a significant portion of her life. Tonelli is known for building special schools of many sorts. She built a school for the deaf in 1980 in Wajir, a Somali-Kenyan town in the northeastern part of Kenya. The school was known for using KSL. Tonelli was awarded the Nansen Refugee Award in 2003 and died shortly after by assassination. In Tonelli's honour, three graduates from Wajir built the Annalena School for the Deaf in Borama, Somali. It was the first school for the deaf ever to be built in Somalia. It was in this school that Somali Sign Language began.

=== Beatrice Anunda and the Demolition of the Humble Hearts School ===
Beatrice Anunda established the Humble Hearts School in Kenya in September 2003. It used both KSL and English, making it the first bilingual deaf school in Kenya. Anunda learned KSL from the KSL Research Project of the University of Nairobi. Recently, the Kenyan Piping Company bulldozed the school, though the government claimed it was an accident due to construction of a pipe that was going through the city. No compensation was paid, but temporary classrooms were made until the Humble Hearts School was rebuilt through the help of philanthropists and volunteers, including an NGO called Angel Covers.
