= Humble Hearts School =

Location
- Sinai, Nairobi; Kenya
- Coordinates: 1°15′00″S 36°55′38″E

Information
- Type: Bilingual school for the deaf
- Established: 9 September 2003 (22 years ago)
- Founder: Beatrice Anunda
- Principal: Beatrice Anunda
- Age range: infancy to 20 years
- Enrollment: 300

Humble Hearts School, Kenya's first bilingual school for the deaf using Kenyan Sign Language (KSL) and English on an equal basis, was started by Beatrice Anunda on 9 September 2003.

== History ==
Anunda was taught Kenyan Sign Language in the University of Nairobi's KSL Research Project, and came across a nine-year-old deaf child called Melinda in Doonholm. Anunda decided to start a project to reach out to deaf children who could not access schooling. In 2005, the project had developed into a school for 30 students in a room of 100 square feet (9.3 m^{2}), constructed of steel roofing sheets. The school began to admit hearing siblings, and then other hearing children in the area of the school were admitted to Humble Hearts to promote inclusion. By the end of 2006, there were 300 students. In addition, KSL classes were offered to parents and others in the local community.

The school is based in Sinai (Paradise), a large slum by Doonholm, a middle-class suburb of Nairobi. In 2009, the school was destroyed when the Kenya Pipeline Company cleared land that was the right-of-way for an underground oil pipeline that ran through the settlement. The school met in temporary classrooms until the school was rebuilt in a new location with the help of philanthropists and volunteers. In 2016, work continued towards improving the school building for 300 students including 125 boarders. The students were provided with e-readers.

== Sister school ==
Humble Hearts has a sister school, Trillium Charter School, located in Portland, Oregon, United States.

== See also ==
- Deaf education in Kenya
- List of schools for the deaf
- List of schools in Kenya
