= Judy Kihumba =

Kenyan sign language interpreter

- Born: 20th century Nieri, Kenya
- Education: University of Nairobi; Saint Paul University; Kenya Association of Professional Counsellors
- Occupations: Kenyan Sign Language interpreter, mental health advocate
- Years active: 2010–present
- Organization(s): Talking Hands, Listening Eyes on Postpartum Depression (THLEP)
- Known for: Providing health information to deaf breastfeeding mothers and promoting mental health awareness
- Awards: BBC 100 Women (2022)

Judy Kihumba (born 20th century, Nieri, Kenya) is a Kenyan Sign Language interpreter who works to provide basic health information, especially related to mental health, to deaf breastfeeding mothers. She was recognized as one of the BBC's 100 Most Inspiring Women in the World in 2022.

== Work and activism ==
Kihumba majored in sign language because it was the only course she could afford working as a maid, doing cleaning tasks in a house. Kihumba decided to deepen her knowledge in this field at the University of Nairobi, in the Kenyan capital. She graduated with a degree in communication for development at Saint Paul University and obtained a Diploma in Trauma Counseling from the Kenya Association of Professional Counsellors.

Kihumba started working at United Disability Empowerment in Kenya, where she delved into the sphere of disabilities. In 2010, she was part of a committee of experts to raise awareness for the country's new constitution. This activity allowed her to get to know the deaf communities in the country very well. Since then, she has worked as a sign language interpreter on television, and in religious ceremonies.

Kihumba had postpartum depression in 2019 after the birth of her second daughter. From that event, she became aware of the importance of mental health education, and when she saw that some hospitals in Kenya did not have sign language interpreters to provide basic health information to deaf breastfeeding mothers, she decided to work in this area. In 2020 she founded "Talking Hands, Listening Eyes on Postpartum Depression - THLEP".

== Recognition ==
Kihumba was recognized as one of the BBC's 100 Most Inspiring Women in the World in 2022.
