= Hands & Voices =

U.S. non-profit organization

Hands & Voices is a non-profit organization based in Colorado, with chapters worldwide, which offers support and advocacy for the families of children who are deaf or hard of hearing. Services include peer support, resource guides, and advocacy for Early Hearing Detection and Intervention (EHDI).

The organization is run primarily by parents of deaf and hard of hearing children, providing "a parent perspective for applications to our real-world situations and needs." While there is controversy in the Deaf community over treatment choices for children, including the use of cochlear implants, teaching ASL, SEE, cued speech, auditory-verbal therapy, lip reading, and others, Hands & Voices "takes a neutral stand on communication-ideology issues."
