= Signalong =

Key-word signing communication method

Signalong is an alternative and augmentative key-word signing communication method used by those individuals with speech, language and communication needs. The Signalong methodology has been effectively used with individuals who have cognitive impairments, autism, Down's Syndrome, specific language impairment, multisensory impairment, and acquired neurological disorders that have negatively affected the ability to communicate, including stroke patients, and people who speak English as a second or third language.

The name "Signalong" is derived from the understanding that wherever possible the sign is accompanied by speech, hence you "sign along with speech". The programme was devised in 1991 by Gill Kennard, a language teacher, Linda Hall, a science teacher who produced the illustrations and Thelma Grove, a speech and language therapist from the Royal College of Speech and Language Therapists.

Signalong is a registered trade mark of The Signalong Group, a charity established in 1994. The original trademark application for Signalong was filed in the UK on 30 April 2001, with registration approved as of that date under UK trademark registration no. 2268715.

== Programme ==
Signalong uses a total communication approach to teach language and literacy skills, through speech, signs and descriptions at the appropriate level for the child or adult's needs. Because of its unique methodology of handshape, orientation, placement and movement, idiosyncratic signs can be de-coded and translated into a format that is consistent and transferable.

Signalong consists of a Core Vocabulary of approximately 1726 concepts, but is not taught in a specific order. Vocabulary should be introduced when required and where possible, with real objects and in real situations to help re-enforce the link between the sign and spoken word.

Although Signalong is a key word signing system, once initial communication has been established, the learner can develop their language to 2, 3 or 4-word level as appropriate. In addition to the Core Vocabulary, there is an additional 7,000 concepts.

== Development ==
In 1983 Kent County Council adopted Derbyshire Language Scheme (DLS), a flexible framework following typical language development used to help children develop their language skills. The DLS vocabulary is based on research into the type of objects and activities experienced by children as they develop. In 1991 due to the lack of vocabulary available from existing signing systems, Gill and Thelma developed vocabulary on the single-word level of the DLS and the vocabulary requested by parents and carers at Abbey Court School.

The first “pilot” copies of Phase 1 were published in April 1992 and as word of Signalong's existence spread the team came under heavy pressure to produce signs for sex education. Although they were already working on Phase 2, this was set aside and, in June 1993, “Personal and Social Education” was the next manual to be published. This brought Signalong to the attention of a much wider user group, the vocabulary being seen as particularly relevant to older learners and adults and in 1994 achieved charitable status. Signalong has over 70 different publications to date.

== Use ==
Signalong is based on British Sign Language adapted for the needs and abilities of children and adults with verbal communication difficulties. It uses one sign per concept, one concept per sign. Signalong is a sign–supporting system used in spoken word order and uses a total communication approach to reference links between signs and words. It also uses key-words, i.e. the essential word in any sentence, and uses signs at the partner's level and moderate language to ensure the message is understood. It is best to start with real objects and real experiences, generalise concepts before moving on to more abstract representations. Vocabulary is needs led and feedback from users helps Signalong to decide on vocabulary research.

When the sign has been selected, a description is worked out. This follows a consistent method of four elements; handshape - how the hands are formed; orientation - how the hands are held; placement - where the hands are held and movement - any changes in the first three elements.

== Criticism ==
Signalong has been critiqued by some members of the Deaf community, including the British Deaf Association. In a 2022 statement, the British Deaf Association expressed serious concerns about the growth of social media posts using "language programmes" that incorporate sign, such as Signalong and Makaton. The statement argued that schools and nurseries teaching children Signalong "give the misleading impression that they are teaching these children something useful, a skill for life" and emphasized the limited nature of Signalong, suggesting that it would make more sense to teach children British Sign Language. The National Deaf Children's Society points out that sign systems such as Signalong are designed to support speech, and that communication between BSL users and people using sign systems can be very difficult.

== See also ==
- Baby sign language
- Oralism
