= Michael Ndurumo =

Kenyan deaf educator

- Born: Michael M. Ndurumo; 10 April 1952 (age 74); Nyeri, Kenya
- Education: Vanderbilt University
- Occupation: Educator

Michael M. Ndurumo (born 10 April 1952) is a deaf educator from Kenya, who was the third deaf person from Africa to obtain a PhD, in 1980. He obtained his BSc, MSc, and PhD degrees from Peabody College of Vanderbilt University, in Tennessee. Ndurumo is an associate professor of psychology at the University of Nairobi, Kenya.

== Background ==
Ndurumo was born in Kenya and became deaf aged eight, as a result of meningitis. Missionaries supported him to attend high school in the United States of America at Harrison-Chilhowee Baptist Academy in Seymour, Tennessee, in 1971. He then studied at Gallaudet University in 1974 where he started his undergraduate education, then transferred to Vanderbilt University in 1976. After obtaining a PhD in educational administration with related areas in psychology and special education, he was an assistant professor in the department of psychology at Gardner–Webb University, North Carolina, starting August 1980 until he returned to his native country, Kenya, in 1982.

== Career ==
From 1982 to 2003, Ndurumo worked at the Kenya Institute of Education, rising to the rank of deputy director and head of special education. He left Kenya Institute of Education in December 2003 and joined Moi University, Eldoret, Kenya as a senior lecturer. In 2009, Ndurumo moved from Moi University to University of Nairobi, where he is now an associate professor of psychology.

From April 1998 to August 1999 Ndurumo served in the Education of Kenya Review Commission. He was a principal player in the development of special education curricula for both undergraduate and graduate levels for the University of Nairobi, Kenyatta University, Daystar University and Kenya Institute of Special Education (KISE). He also developed the first distance education course in special education for the University of Nairobi. He has written a distance education module on educational psychology for the Kenya Institute of Special Education and has taught sign language and principles of total communication at Daystar University and Maseno University in Kenya.

Ndurumo led in the development of the M.A and PhD degree programs in Counselling Psychology for Moi University where he also launched the implementation of the PhD in educational psychology degree program. He is the author of Exceptional Children: Developmental Consequences and Intervention.

Ndurumo is the editor-in-chief and one of the founders of the African Annals of the Deaf. He is also the founding chair of the Kenya National Association of the Deaf, and the founding secretary of the Kenya Association of the Hard of Hearing. Ndurumo founded the African Institute of Deaf Studies and Research, and was a member of the selection committee for the appointment of members of the National Educational Board. He has been involved in leadership, education, and other matters pertaining to disabled persons in his country. He has also been involved in religious leadership of the deaf, and was a friend of Andrew Foster, one of the foremost missionaries to the deaf in Africa.

Ndurumo was influential in getting American Signed English adopted in Kenyan schools for deaf children; this "was opposed by the deaf community ... [and] remains a sore point for many deaf Kenyans to this day", as it is based on English rather than Kenyan languages.

== University for the deaf ==
Ndurumo has an interest in establishing a university for the deaf in Africa. This vision is now being championed in Kenya by the Kenya Society for Deaf Children.

== Honors and awards ==
Ndurumo is a recipient of numerous honours and awards. In December 2000, he was awarded the Distinguished Service Medal by the President of the Republic of Kenya for his distinguished service to the country, and was the Harrison-Chilhowee Baptist Academy Outstanding Alumnus of the Year 2001. Ndurumo was the Andrew Foster visiting professor at Gallaudet University for the year 2000.
