= Richard Paget =

Richard Paget may refer to:

- Sir Richard Paget, 1st Baronet, British politician
- Sir Richard Paget, 2nd Baronet, British barrister and amateur scientific investigator
