= The Best Sleepover in the World =

2023 novel by Jacqueline Wilson

- Author: Jacqueline Wilson
- Illustrator: Rachael Dean
- Language: English
- Genre: Children's novel
- Publisher: Puffin (first edition, hardback)
- Publication date: 17 August 2023
- Publication place: United Kingdom
- Media type: Print (hardback, Ebook & paperback) and audiobook
- Pages: 224
- ISBN: 978-024-156-722-7
- Preceded by: Sleepovers
- Followed by: The Seaside Sleepover

The Best Sleepover in the World is a children's novel written by Jacqueline Wilson and illustrated by Rachael Dean. It is a sequel to Wilson's 2001 novel Sleepovers and it was released on 17 August 2023, published by Puffin Books. In the story, Daisy is excluded from a sleepover that her friends are invited to by Chloe. Meanwhile, Daisy's sister, Lily, communicates to Daisy that she wants a sleepover of her own.

Wilson wrote the sequel after realising how popular the 2001 novel was. Wilson included the augmentative and alternative communication language Makaton in the novel in order to illustrate how Lily, who is disabled and non-verbal, communicates in comparison to Sleepovers. Wilson worked with Disability Rights UK to ensure that Lily's story was told well. To celebrate the novel's release, four libraries in Hampshire held their own "Best Sleepover in the World" events. The novel has received generally good reviews, with Wilson's writing and Dean's illustrations being praised. A third novel in the series, The Seaside Sleepover, was released in 2025.

== Synopsis ==
Set a few months following the events of Sleepovers, Daisy's enemy, Chloe, invites Daisy's friends (Amy, Bella and Emily) to her sleepover, but excludes Daisy. Meanwhile, Daisy's non-verbal sister, Lily, is learning Makaton and signs to Daisy that she wants to have a sleepover of her own, so their family and Daisy try to make Lily's party the best sleepover possible. Amy and Bella end up going to Chloe's sleepover whilst Emily goes to Lily's. Daisy, Lily and Emily enjoy their sleepover, whilst Bella and Amy comment that Chloe's was not as good as they thought it would be.

== Development ==
"I've always been touched that so many young women have told me that Sleepovers was their favourite out of all my stories, and that it was their comfort book as they got older. I've often wondered what happened to Daisy and her non-verbal sister, Lily. At long last I've written a sequel, The Best Sleepover in The World, so we can all find out – and see how Lily comes into her own."

— Wilson on why she wrote the novel (2023)

In March 2023, it was announced that Puffin Books would publish Jacqueline Wilson's The Best Sleepover in the World, the sequel to her 2001 novel Sleepovers. It was also announced that the novel would be for readers over the age of six and have black-and-white illustrations throughout by illustrator Rachael Dean. It was revealed that continued interest in the 2001 novel, which had sold nearly 500,000 copies since 2001, prompted Wilson to "revisit" the story about Daisy, the protagonist, and her sister, Lily. Wilson had considered Sleepovers one of her minor works, but she began noticing its popularity when she would ask fans which of her books were their favourites; Wilson believed this popularity was due to the themes of sleepovers, friendships and "friendships betrayed" that take place in the story. Kelly Hurst, Puffin's editorial director who had acquired UK and Commonwealth rights for the title, revealed that he always recommended Sleepovers as the best of Wilsons' books, saying, "it's wonderful to see how Jacqueline captures perfectly the real-life joys and woes of friends and sisters in this sequel". Hurst revealed that the charity Disability Rights UK had worked with Wilson and Puffin in order to ensure that Lily's story was told with positive representation.

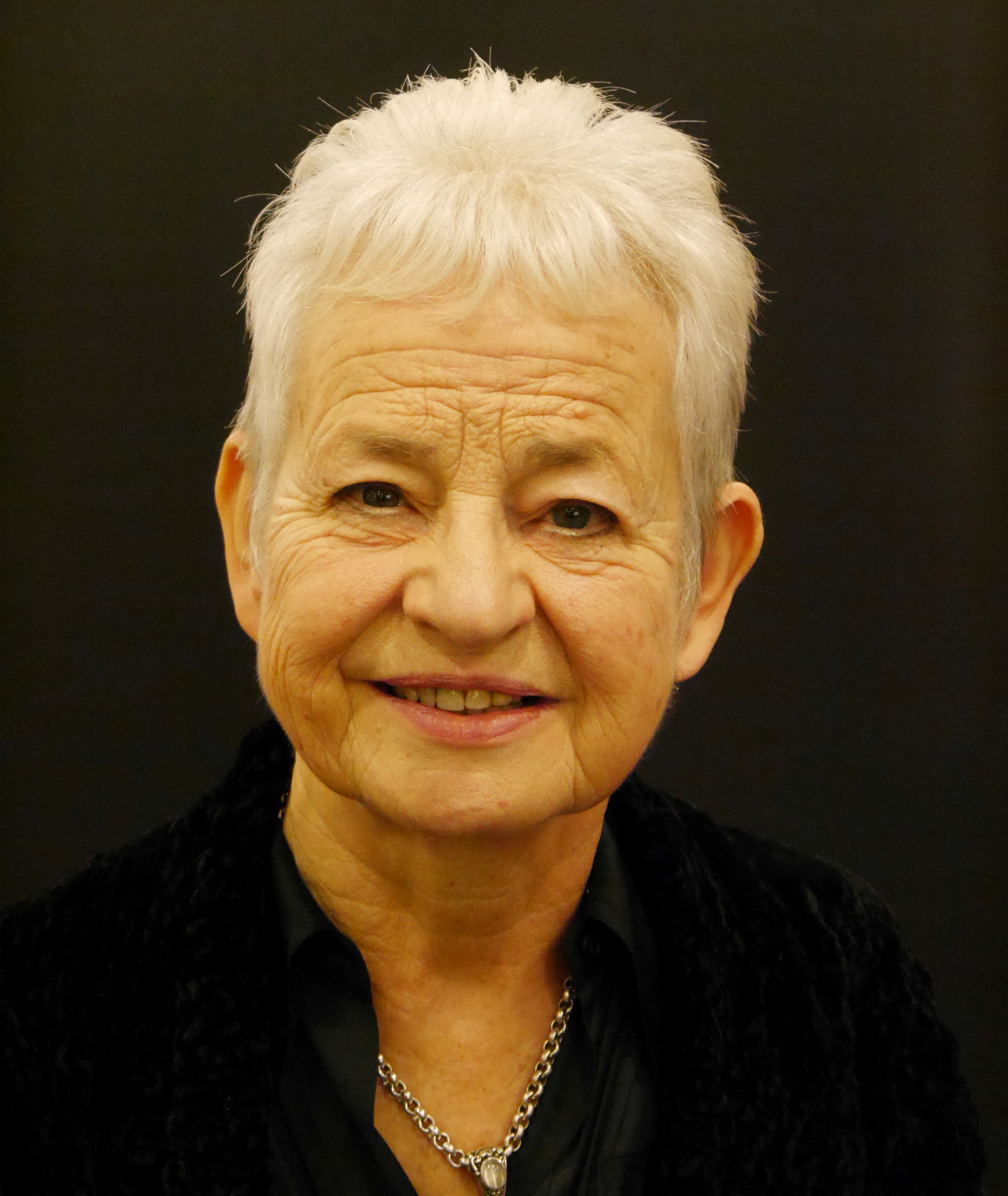
Jacqueline Wilson wrote the sequel after realising how popular Sleepovers was.

Wilson dedicated the novel to Nikki Holt and Lucinda, a mother and daughter who post educational videos on YouTube about learning and teaching Makaton, a unique language with speech, signs and symbols that enables people with disabilities to communicate, which inspired Wilson to include it in the novel. Wilson subscribed to their channel and has said that she adores the duo, calling them "lovely" and praising the duo for teaching her so much and cheering her up when she watches their videos. Nikki Holt received an email from someone from Wilsons' PR team telling her about the dedication, which she was impressed by, and she expressed happiness that there was Makaton in a mainstream book, calling it "just amazing". Wilson used the pair's videos to research and learn a bit of Makaton. Speaking of its role in the story, Wilson explained that Lily, despite being non-verbal, is able to communicate well due to having learnt Makaton, meaning that she is able to make jokes and help Daisy gain an advantage over the girl who has been causing her suffering.

Wilson tried to reflect the change of technology and attitudes in The Best Sleepover in the World by updating the setting to modern times despite the characters being the same ages in the prequel. Whilst Lily is mostly passive in the 2001 novel, Lily in the sequel is described as "sassy", "spary", "communicative" and "the hero", is able to communicate using Makaton and has a "super-cool" disabled best friend, which was done to reflect the modern times. Wilson also tried to showcase Lily's sense of humour, which Wilson believed did not come across in the prequel. Talking about the changes, Wilson explained "There is a lot that is weird about modern times, but we should congratulate ourselves in that we're much more accepting of people who are gloriously different in all sorts of ways". Wilson also showcased the updated setting by having Chloe boast about bringing a TikTok influencer to the party. The novel also includes Gary, Daisy's uncle, performing in drag, which some early readers were unsure was appropriate; Wilson decided to keep the character in regardless, explaining, "Very young children see drag artists on television. It's become a perfectly acceptable part of modern life." Wilson also opined that The Best Sleepover in the World was "relatively short" but explored "all aspects of friendship", which she hoped readers would like.

== Release and promotion ==
To celebrate the release of the book, four libraries in Hampshire held their own "Best Sleepover in the World", which were organised by Hampshire Libraries Service after they were approached by Puffin. The events included more than 250 Brownies taking part in activities such as making dreamcatchers and friendship bracelets and learning phrases in Makaton. Wilson was thrilled by these events and hoped that the participants would have a good time. Steve Forster, Hampshire County Council's executive member for education, expressed delight that the events took place due to believing that they would help encourage a long-term love of reading and books.

== Sequel ==
A third novel in the series, The Seaside Sleepover, authored by Wilson and illustrated by Dean, was released in 2025.

== Reception ==
The sequel has been referred to as "long-awaited". The Independent chose The Best Sleepover in the World as the tabloid's "Children's book of the week" in the article published on 30 August 2023. The reviewer, Joanne Brennan, called the book an "absolute delight to read" and that it would "enthral" children. She praised the book for teaching about inclusion and helping readers be aware of numerous forms of disabilities, and she also noted the "genuine love" between Daisy and her sister. Brennan believed that the cover was eye-catching but was disappointed that the rest of the book did not feature colour illustrations. The Belfast Telegraph labelled the book "The one about inclusion" and named it one of the best books from 2023. Pam Norfolk's review in Lancashire Evening Post called the sequel heartwarming and noted that it explored "those all-too-familiar worries about bullying, disabilities, siblings and friendships" that had been depicted in Sleepovers. Norfolk wrote that Dean's "beautifully emotive" illustrations brought the "sensitively written and inspirational story to life" and noted that readers would enjoy following the characters through "another rollercoaster chapter of family and friendship dramas". She also praised Wilson for "understanding and acknowledging the fears that so often beset children" and for her subtle messages of guidance and help, calling it "Wilson on her very best – and most entertaining – storytelling form". Gwendolyn Smith from i believed that the book did a "particularly good job of capturing the psychodrama of being an eight or nine-year-old girl". She also revealed that the addition of a drag queen in the novel led to Wilson being accused of "being too ahead of her time" and "ruffled feathers among early readers".
