= Sleepovers (novel) =

2001 novel by Jacqueline Wilson

- The original 2001 cover
- Author: Jacqueline Wilson
- Illustrator: Nick Sharratt
- Cover artist: Nick Sharratt
- Language: English
- Series: Sleepovers
- Publisher: Doubleday
- Publication date: 2001
- Media type: Print (hardback, Ebook & paperback) and audiobook
- Pages: 112
- ISBN: 978-0385601818
- Followed by: The Best Sleepover in the World

Sleepovers is a 2001 children's novel by the English writer Jacqueline Wilson, illustrated by Nick Sharratt. It follows Daisy and her classmates Amy, Bella, Chloe and Emily as they each have sleepovers for their birthdays. In the novel, Daisy struggles with Chloe being mean to her and the fear that Chloe will judge her disabled older sister, Lily. Wilson enjoyed writing the novel and believed that its popularity was due to its themes of friendship and sleepovers. The novel was received positively and has been regarded as one of Wilson's most popular works. Wilson published a sequel, The Best Sleepover in the World, in 2023. A third novel in the series, The Seaside Sleepover, was released in 2025.

== Plot ==
Daisy and her friends at her new school – Amy, Bella, Chloe, Daisy and Emily – are known as The Alphabet Girls. Each girl has their birthday coming up and they decide to have sleepover parties. Chloe, however, torments Daisy, which makes Daisy worried about Chloe meeting Lily, Daisy's disabled older sister. At Amy's sleepover, the girls sing, dance, paint their nails together and have a midnight feast. Daisy helps Emily when she is sick and wishes Emily could be her best friend. For Bella's sleepover, the girls go swimming and then have food and cake at Bella's house.

For Emily's sleepover, the girls all go to the park for a picnic. Chloe is annoyed by Emily's idea of bringing her and Daisy's teddy bears to the picnic and singing the song "The Teddy Bears' Picnic", calling it babyish. Chloe pushes Daisy out of the car, causing her to scrape her knees and Chloe lies that it was an accident. Emily lets Daisy share her bed and their friendship grows. Chloe tries to not invite Daisy to her sleepover party by falsely claiming that her mother will not allow her to invite four people, but the others refuse to come without Daisy. Chloe eventually gives in and lets Daisy come. At the party, they make pizzas, but Chloe sabotages Daisy's pizza by covering it with anchovies, which Daisy hates. Chloe says that Daisy's piece of birthday cake will have an anchovy filling, which causes Daisy to not eat any. They then watch horror movies, which causes Daisy to stay awake all night.

Daisy is worried about having a sleepover party herself as she fears the girls, particularly Chloe, will be uncomfortable about Lily. Daisy's father suggests not inviting Chloe, but Daisy's mother reveals that Chloe has already been invited after Chloe's mother phoned out of concern after the sleepover due to Daisy not eating anything. When the girls meet Lily, they are very understanding about her; however, Chloe is very gloomy and rude when they all play party games together with Daisy's father. The girls all sleep in a big tent in the garden. Chloe wakes Daisy in the middle of the night to take her to the bathroom. When they get upstairs, Lily wails loudly upon hearing them and scares Chloe, causing her to wet herself. When the girls see Chloe again back at school, she spreads rumours about Lily being a maniac baby. The others stand up for Daisy and Lily, and Chloe angrily breaks up with them. From then on, the girls remain a group of four and Emily becomes Daisy's best friend.

== Publication ==
An updated version of the paperback edition was released on 13 March 2008, published by Young Corgi. Wilson enjoyed writing about the five sleepovers in the book and found it fun to pick a different theme for each one. Wilson called Emily a really "sweet girl" but opined that Chloe was "seriously scary" and very horrible to Daisy despite appearing like "butter wouldn't melt in her mouth". She believed that most people knew a girl like Chloe in their lives. Wilson initially considered Sleepovers one of her minor works, but over the years after its release, she began to realise its popularity when she asked fans which of her books were their favourites; Wilson believed this popularity was due to the themes of sleepovers, friendships and "friendships betrayed" that take place in the story.

== Sequels ==
A sequel, The Best Sleepover in the World, was published in 2023, although this book was illustrated by Rachael Dean. The sequel takes place a few months after Sleepovers, but is set in the time it was published. Wilson explained that she decided to write a sequel after she found out that Sleepovers was one of her steadiest selling books. Wilson developed Lily's character in the novel by giving her her own best friend and showing her communicating using Makaton. Wilson also tried to showcase Lily's sense of humour, which Wilson believed did not come across in the prequel.

A third novel in the Sleepover series, The Seaside Sleepover, authored by Wilson and illustrated by Dean, was released in 2025.

== Reception ==
Sleepovers has been regarded as one of Wilson's best novels and is one of her five best bestselling books. Miriam Moore from The Spinoff ranked Sleepover as her third favourite novel of Wilson, writing, "God I loved this book. I never owned it but every time I handed it back to the library I put it on my reserves list again (which took months due to its popularity)". Moore thought that the girls calling themselves the "Alphabet girls" and having their names start with the first five letters of the alphabet was very cool and she called Chloe the "bitch-friend". A reviewer from The Guardian said she would recommend the book as it "teaches you that everyone is special" and shows that there are friends to help if "you are bullied", and recommended it for readers between the ages of 7 and 12. Another reviewer from The Guardian found the book humorous and rated it "9 ¾ out of 10". A writer from the same website believed that Wilson was "thought-provoking" rather than "preachy" in the novel. A writer from The Independent opined that the novel had all of Wilson's "hallmarks of humour, good sense and a profound realism". In 2023, Kelly Hurst, Puffin Books' editorial director, revealed that he always recommended Sleepovers as the best of Wilsons' books, saying, "it's wonderful to see how Jacqueline captures perfectly the real-life joys and woes of friends and sisters in this sequel".

A reviewer from Reading Time believed that the sleepovers in the novel highlighted the themes of "friends and family". They also opined that Wilson is able to "weave important lessons" about life and friendship "with real appeal to younger readers" and noted that Sharratt's "simple line drawings attractively supplement the text". In 2014, Surrey Live included the novel on their list of "previous books which are worth a read". Ella Dove from Good Housekeeping placed Sleepovers on her list of the 10 best Jacqueline Wilson books, calling it a "charming tale of siblings and friendship". A writer from TES believed that the novel was highly "entertaining", whilst a writer from Waterstones Books Quarterly called the novel "funny and touching" and opined that it encouraged readers to "explore the worries of bullies, disabilities and making new friends". Frances Perkins from the Bournemouth Daily Echo referred to the book as a "warm" story about the "importance of friendship and fitting in".
