= Kisii =

Kisii may refer to:

- Kisii, Kenya, a municipality and the capital of Kisii County
- Kisii County, one of the 47 counties of Kenya
- Kisii District, a former district of Kenya
- Gucha District, in Kenya, also known as South Kisii District
- Nyamira District, in Kenya, also known as North Kisii District
- Kisii people, an ethnic group in Kenya, also known as Abagusii or Gusii people
- Gusii language, Bantu language spoken by the Kisii people
- Kisii School for the Deaf, the only Deaf-run school for Deaf children in Kenya
- Kisii stone, a name for soapstone, quarried in Tabaka area of southern Kisii District
- Kisii University, Kenya

== See also ==
- Gusii (disambiguation)
