= Margaret Walker (speech therapist) =

British speech and language therapist (born 1938)

Margaret Walker FRCSLT MBE
- Born: 1938 (age 87–88)
- Occupation: Speech and language therapist
- Awards: Pride of Britain Award, 2019

Academic work
- Institutions: Botleys Park Hospital, Chertsey; St George's, University of London

Margaret Walker FRCSLT MBE (born 1938) is a British speech and language therapist who co-developed the language programme Makaton in the 1970s.

== Career ==
Walker was one of the three developers of the language programme Makaton. The name of the programme is derived from the first letters of the names of the three therapists who helped devise the programme in the 1970s: Margaret Walker, Katharine Johnston and Tony Cornforth.

Walker was awarded Fellowship of the Royal College of Speech and Language Therapists in 1986, and appointed MBE in the 1997 Birthday Honours for services to Healthcare whilst working at St George's, University of London. In 2019 she was recognised in the Pride of Britain Awards.

== Publications ==
- (with Hooper, H) (2002). "Makaton peer tutoring evaluation: 10 years on". British Journal of Learning Disabilities, 30, 38–42, BILD Publications
- (with Grove, Nicola) (1990). "The Makaton Vocabulary: Using manual signs and graphic symbols to develop interpersonal communication", Augmentative and Alternative Communication, 6:1, 15-28, DOI: 10.1080/07434619012331275284
- Walker, M & Armfield, I A (1987). ‘What is the Makaton Vocabulary?" Special Education: Forward Trends. 8 (3) 19-20
- Walker, M (1986). "Understanding Makaton", Special Children, 1, 6, 22-2
- (with Parsons, F S, Cousins, S, Henderson, R & Carpenter, B) (1985). Symbols for Makaton. Camberley, Surrey: Makaton Vocabulary Development Project
- "The Makaton Vocabulary: From Britain to the Antipodes", Australasian Journal of Special Education, 8:2, November 1984, 8-11, DOI: 10.1017/S1030011200021187
- Walker, M (1978). "The Makaton Vocabulary" in Tebbs, T. (ed.) Ways and Means. Basingstoke: Globe Education
- (with Cornforth, A & Johnston, K) (1974). "Makaton Vocabulary: Teaching Sign Language to the Deaf Mentally Handicapped", Apex, 2, 23-25
