= Gusii =

Gusii or Kisii may refer to:

- Gusii people, a tribal people of Kenya
- Gusii language, their Bantu language

== See also ==
- Kisii (disambiguation)
