= Kenyan Sign Language =

Deaf sign language of Kenya and Somalia

Kenyan Sign Language (KSL)
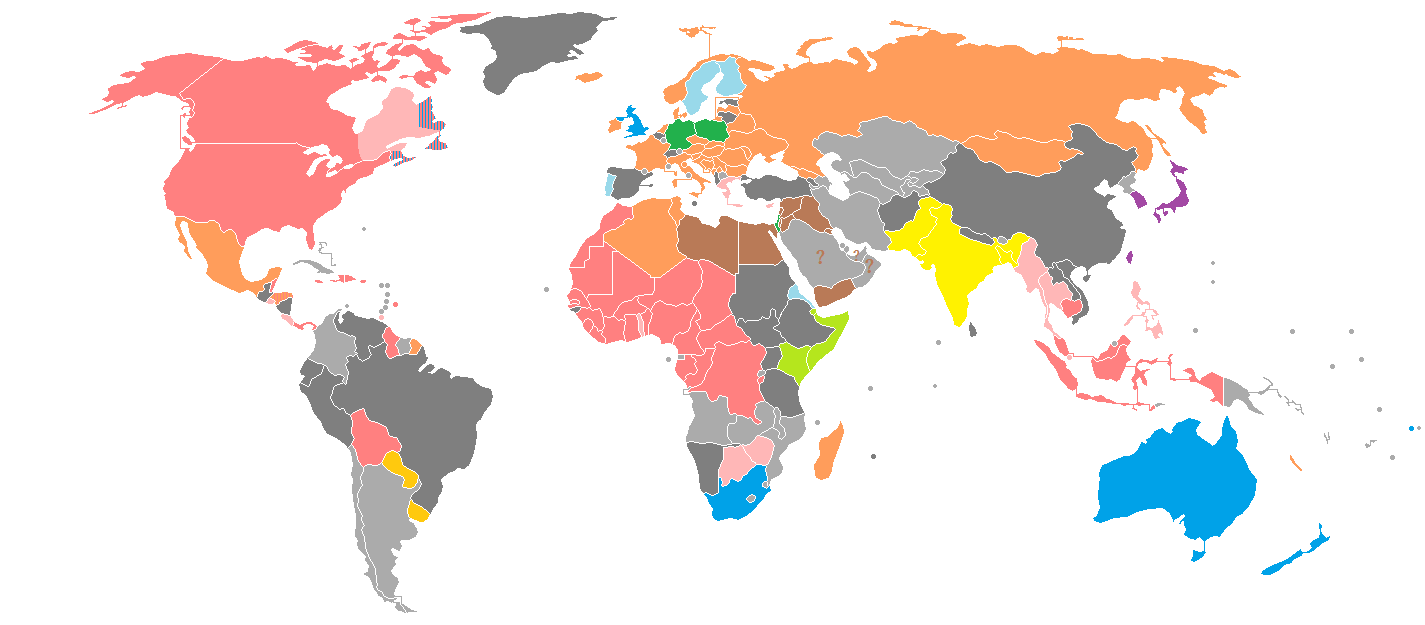
- Native to: Kenya, Somalia
- Native speakers: unknown; 300,000–600,000 deaf (2007, 2011)
- Language family: Unknown. May have connections to British Sign Language and American Sign Language; some signs from French (Belgian) Sign Language
- Dialects: Somali SL

Language codes
- ISO 639-3: xki
- Glottolog: keny1241

Kenyan Sign Language (English: KSL, Swahili: LAK) is a sign language used by the deaf community in Kenya and Somalia. It is used by over half of Kenya's estimated 600,000 deaf population. There are some dialect differences between Kisumu (western Kenya), Mombasa (eastern Kenya) and Somalia. (See Somali Sign Language.)

== Language situation ==
As well as Kenyan Sign Language, a number of other languages have been used for instruction in Kenya: Belgian Sign Language (in one school only), British Sign Language (in one school only), American Sign Language, KIE Signed English, and even Korean Sign Language. It is probable that students in these schools use a form of KSL regardless.

A manual alphabet exists mainly from the American Sign Language manual alphabet. However the British manual alphabet was used in the early years.

== Status and recognition ==
KSL currently has no legal status, but there is a proposal that Kenyan Sign Language (KSL) and Braille should be recognized in the country's new constitution as national and official Languages alongside English and Swahili.

Interpreters are rarely available, and usually 'unqualified' uncertified due to the lack of a training program/certification process but due to many efforts put in along by the deaf associations ksl was recognized as a national language alongside English and kiswahili.

== Kenya Sign Language Interpreters Association ==
Kenya Sign Language Interpreters Association was set up by a group of 20 local interpreters after training by the first Deaf Education US Peace Corps Volunteers in September 2000. Prior to this training there were several short term trainings conducted by KSLRP/KNAD dating back to 1980s and 1990s. [KSLIA] is an indigenous initiative evolving and strengthening the face of the Interpreting profession in Kenya. [KSLIA] hopes to improve and elevate the standards of Interpreting in Kenya through the following objectives:

1. To secure official recognition by the government of SL interpreters profession;
2. Encourage and promote initiatives in improving the standards of SL interpreting and interpreter training and pay scale of interpreters depending on their level and skills of interpretation through certification;
3. Cooperation with other recognized bodies concerned in the welfare of the deaf and in provision of SL interpreters throughout the world;
4. Awareness creation on Deafness and SL interpreters through publication of information materials;
5. To collect and raise funds for the achievement of goals and objectives through membership fee, subscription, contribution, gifts or donations, commissions and payments, fund raising whether in money or otherwise from both members and non-members;
6. To maintain and administer a registry of SL interpreters in Kenya, enforce a code of ethics and mediate conflict between the interpreters and their clients.

KSLIA is working towards the establishment of a training program and a certification process for its membership. [KSLIA] envisions its role in a three-pronged approach - the three C's - Certification of members, Continuing education for the practising interpreters and Conflict resolution through enforcement of the Code of Ethics.

Global Deaf Connection, Deaf Aid, and KSLIA have jointly organized a series of trainings aimed at developing a process to provide training, certification and continued professional development for Kenyan interpreters.

== Dictionaries and Education ==
A Kenyan Sign Language dictionary was published in 1991. KSLRP working with Peace Corp Volunteers have recently developed an interactive digital dictionary ([KSL Interactive])

A new online dictionary and mobile application has been published at www.ksldictionary.com since the year 2015 by Kenneth Smith Gathuru. ([KSL Dictionary]

KSL is not generally used in the classrooms of Kenya's 35 residential boarding schools for deaf students, despite it being their main language, and reportedly literacy in English and Swahili is very low among the deaf community. Since the first deaf schools were established in the 1960s, the teaching staff rarely (if ever) included a deaf person, until a government program in the 1990s (spearheaded by the Kenya National Association of the Deaf) saw two deaf individuals trained and employed as teachers. However, the program is now continued by Global Deaf Connection chaired by Nickson Kakiri. It is based at Machakos Teachers College.

== Sign language organizations ==
The Kenya National Association of the Deaf (KNAD) is a national non-governmental organisation formed and managed by Deaf people. It was established in 1986 and registered in 1987 under the Societies Act; KNAD is also an ordinary member of the World Federation of the Deaf.

The Kenyan Sign Language Interpreters Association (KSLIA) is a national, non governmental, Society formed and managed by Kenyan Interpreters to promote the development of the Interpreting profession in Kenya and to provide quality Interpretation services for Deaf Kenyans. It was established in September 2000. KSLIA is working on becoming a member of WASLI World Association of Sign Language Interpreters.

Jehovah's Witnesses are a religious organization who have produced music, videos and articles in Kenya Sign Language, as well as a current total of 106 different Sign Languages. The organization has partially translated the Bible in Kenya Sign Language, and a total of 97 different Sign Language Bible translations either in whole or part. Jehovah's Witnesses hold weekly Kenya Sign Language meetings in Mombasa, Nairobi, Nakuru, Eldoret and Kisumu; the meetings are free to enter and deaf can also choose to have a free Bible study program in Kenya Sign Language.

== Sign Bilingual Schools ==
Humble Hearts School in Nairobi, Kisii School for the Deaf and Kenya Christian School for the Deaf at Oyugis use KSL as the language of instruction. Humble Hearts School is Kenya's first sign bilingual school where KSL and English are taught on an equal par. Kedowa School for the Deaf in Kericho District also uses KSL for instruction, and is unique among Deaf schools in Kenya in that more than half of the teachers at the school are Deaf themselves.
