= Eugene Gorman =

Australian Army officer and lawyer

Sir Eugene Gorman
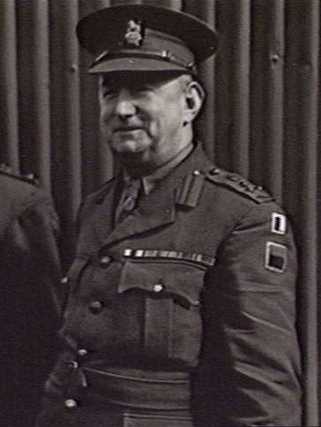
- Brigadier Eugene Gorman in 1943
- Born: 10 April 1891; Goornong, Victoria
- Died: 19 July 1973 (aged 82); East Melbourne, Victoria
- Relatives: Pierre Gorman (son)
- Military career
- Allegiance: Australia
- Branch: Australian Army
- Service years: 1915–1919; 1940–1945
- Rank: Brigadier
- Commands: AIF Reception Group United Kingdom (1944–45)
- Conflicts: First World War; Second World War
- Awards: Knight Commander of the Order of the British Empire; Military Cross; Mentioned in Despatches; Knight Commander of the Royal Order of the Phoenix (Greece)

Brigadier Sir Eugene "Pat" Gorman, KBE, MC, QC (10 April 1891 – 19 July 1973) was an Australian barrister and military officer.

== Early life ==
Gorman was born in Goornong, Victoria, on 10 April 1891 to Patrick Gorman and his Irish wife, Mary Mulcair. He was educated in Sydney at St Joseph's College, Hunters Hill. After serving as an articled clerk in Bendigo, he was admitted to practise as a solicitor and barrister on 5 May 1914.

== Military service ==
During the First World War, which began in August 1914, Gorman enlisted in the Australian Imperial Force (AIF) on 4 September 1915. After being commissioned in June 1916, Gorman served in Europe on the Western Front, arriving there in December 1916. He was posted to the 22nd Battalion, an infantry unit, and on 3 May 1917, during the Second Battle of Bullecourt, he led his company into battle, and despite being severely wounded, remained at his post until the company was relieved. For these actions, Gorman was awarded the Military Cross (MC), the citation for which reads:

For conspicuous gallantry and devotion to duty. He displayed the utmost courage and ability in leading his company during an attack, and, although severely wounded, he remained at his post until his party were relieved after a most exhausting and dangerous turn of duty.

Gorman later reached the rank of captain in early 1919 before being discharged from the AIF in October 1919 upon his repatriation to Australia. He subsequently published a book about his experiences, titled With the Twenty-Second.

During the Second World War, which began in September 1939, Gorman served alongside the Australian forces in the Middle East as an honorary commissioner to the Australian Comforts Fund. He returned to Australia in 1942, and the following April was appointed to the Second Australian Imperial Force. Holding the substantive rank of colonel, he was appointed as a temporary brigadier and fulfilled the role of Chief Inspector of Army Administration, before being sent to the United Kingdom to command the AIF Reception Group, which was responsible for repatriating released prisoners of war back to Australia. After the war, he was transferred to the reserve list in November 1945.

== Legal career ==
Following his service in the First World War, Gorman resumed his legal career, building up a large and highly regarded practice, and took silk as a King's Counsel in 1929.

Gorman had some involvement in politics, unsuccessfully standing as a candidate for the Victorian Legislative Council in 1931, and serving as an influential advisor and intermediary for the Country Party Premier of Victoria, Albert Dunstan, from 1935.

In 1940, Gorman retired from active practice from the Bar, although he retained rooms at Equity Chambers, and came out of retirement on several occasions including serving as counsel for former Premier Thomas Hollway at a Royal Commission on bribery charges in 1952, an inquiry into the Petrov Affair in 1954, and to defend the racehorse trainer Harry Bird in 1969. According to his secretary, Gorman ran "the biggest free advisory legal service in Melbourne", offering legal advice pro bono to young lawyers, politicians and businesspeople.

From 1956 to 1968, Gorman was Chairman of the Commonwealth Dried Fruits Export Board.

== Honours ==
In addition to the Military Cross, Gorman was awarded two honours of the Order of the British Empire, both for service to the dried fruits industry. He was made a Commander (CBE) in 1960, and elevated to Knight Commander (KBE) in 1966.

Gorman served as Victoria's consul-general to Greece, and was awarded two Greek honours: the gold cross of the Greek Red Cross and Knight Commander of the Royal Order of the Phoenix.

Gorman's rooms in the Equity Chambers building on Melbourne's Bourke Street were named the Gorman Chambers in his honour, and have been maintained and occupied since his death by a group of barristers.

== Personal life ==
Gorman married French-born Marthe Vallée, whom he had met while serving in France during the First World War, at St Patrick's Cathedral on 6 September 1920. Their son, Pierre Gorman, was born completely deaf in 1924, and went on to become the first deaf person to graduate from the University of Cambridge, and a well-known educator and expert on disability issues. Vallée died in 1966.
