= Manually coded English =

Signed communication systems used with spoken English

Manually Coded English (MCE) is an umbrella term referring to a number of invented manual codes intended to visually represent the exact grammar and morphology of spoken English. Different codes of MCE vary in the levels of adherence to spoken English grammar, morphology, and syntax. MCE is typically used in conjunction with direct spoken English.

== Manually coded English systems ==
Manually coded English (MCE) is the result of language planning efforts in multiple countries, especially the United States in the 1970s. Four systems were developed in attempts to represent spoken English manually; Seeing Essential English (also referred to as Morphemic Signing System (MSS) or SEE-1), Signing Exact English (SEE-2 or SEE), Linguistics of Visual English (LOVE), or Signed English (SE). System developers and educators disagree on the relative accuracy and appropriateness of these four representations. MCE is different from American Sign Language, which is a natural language with a distinct morphology, lexicon, and syntax. Rather, North American varieties of MCE borrow some lexical items of American Sign Language (although meanings and morphology may be significantly constrained or altered) while attempting to strictly follow English morphology, syntax, and word order. Deaf sign languages make use of non-sequential morphology, spatial relationships, facial expression, and body positioning, while MCE does not take advantage of Deaf sign language features which do not exist in spoken English, with a "spatially restricted, sequential structure along with a strict word order".

== Use in communication ==
Although some research suggests that experience can improve the degree to which the information coded in English (morphologically as well as syntactically) is successfully communicated manually, especially by learners who are hearing and/or already fluent in spoken English, multiple studies have identified a number of potential concerns about the use of MCE systems in place of a natural language. The morphological structure of nearly all MCE systems is very different from the structure of documented sign languages. As a result, deaf children exposed only to MCE acquire the artificially created English-like bound morphology of MCE systems later than their hearing peers. Additionally, deaf children being taught MCE show an "anomalous" pattern of use with these morphemes. For example, they frequently analyze morphemes that are bound in English, such as "-ing," as free morphemes, separating these morphemes from the contexts they are bound to in English and placing them elsewhere in a construction, producing sentences that are judged as ungrammatical by hearing English users. Notably, neither typically developing hearing children acquiring spoken English nor deaf children acquiring ASL as a first language display these patterns of anomalous syntactic acquisition.

Another potential issue with MCE is the rate of information flow. Studies on rate of signing MCE suggest that some systems may take up to two and a half times the amount of time necessary to transmit the same information in either spoken English or American Sign Language. Researchers suggest that this may significantly disrupt communication using these systems, as it may lead to an excessive load on the short term memory compared to natural languages.

In English-speaking countries, some users of Deaf sign languages will code-switch into a form of MCE when conversing with someone whose dominant language is English, or when quoting something from English, although contact signing may be more common. MCE is also sometimes favored by some hearing people, for whom a manual version of their own language is perceived as easier to learn than a deaf sign language. However, multiple studies suggest that many hearing users of MCE systems may struggle to communicate effectively or comprehensively using these systems.

== In education ==
The different forms of manually coded English were originally developed for use in the education of deaf children in English-speaking countries, based on the assumption that a signing system that was closer to English would make it easier for deaf children to communicate in written and/or spoken English, which many parents and educators perceive as superior or more desirable to using a Deaf sign language. MCE was proposed to improve the speed and capacity of deaf children's reading, as their literacy in written English has been typically low compared to their hearing peers.

An early form of this educational method was popularized by Abbé Charles-Michel de l'Epee who in the 1790s developed a method using hand-signs to teach a form of the French language to deaf children. L'Epee distinguished signs used in Institut National de Jeunes Sourds de Paris, the school he founded, into two categories: "Natural Signs," or Old French Sign Language, the language used by his students in the community, and "Methodical Signs," which was designed to encourage students to sign in the syntax of French. These constructed "Methodical Signs," however, had already fallen out of use by the 1830s, as the school's third director, Roche-Ambrose Bébian, wrote about their structural failings - especially the distortion of sign language structure - relative to "Natural Signs" and ended their use within the school. "Methodical Signs" fell out of favor in Europe and America, and "the idea of intervening in the natural development of sign language and restructuring signs in accordance with the grammar of spoken language was not revived again until the popularization of MCE in the 1970s." Education is still the most common setting where manually coded English is used; not only with deaf students, but also children with other kinds of speech or language difficulties.

The use of MCE in deaf education is controversial. Contemporary deaf education can follow one or a number of educational philosophies and reform efforts, including education in the local natural deaf sign language, education in a colonial sign language, bilingual-bicultural, Total Communication, a manually coded system based on the ambient spoken language (such as MCE), or oralism.

One major obstacle to the utility and enforcement of the use of MCE is the criteria used to evaluate it. Multiple researchers note that MCE use by deaf children acquiring it as a first language is typically evaluated according to its adherence to citation forms of spoken English (i.e., MCE utterances are evaluated as if they were spoken English utterances) rather than its intelligibility as a form of communication or a language. Moreover, many studies which evaluate the competence of hearing teachers of the deaf in MCE communication do not evaluate the extent to which deaf students understand what their teachers are expressing. These teachers reported avoiding using spoken English words or constructions that they did not know how to express in MCE, limiting their overall language use. While many studies have found MCE to be comprehensible to those familiar with the code, fewer have attempted to evaluate whether it is equivalently suitable for first language acquisition, given the frequency of morpheme deletion or ellipsis.

In a study of prelingually deaf children taught exclusively using MCE, S. Supalla documented that these individuals displayed spontaneous (without prior exposure), ASL-like innovations. Specifically, rather than using the MCE morphemes designed to mark case, tense, and gender as they are in English, these children demonstrated the use of deictic pointing and spatial modification of verbs, linguistic features not part of MCE because they are considered unique to signed languages.

Finally, the ethics of MCE use is also a matter of contention. ASL is a minority language in North America. The majority of deaf people are born to hearing parents, and are not exposed to ASL from a young age. Many culturally Deaf adults raise issues with the manipulation of a minority groups' language in order to enforce learning of the majority language onto children from that minority group. Many hearing parents are encouraged to expose their child to MCE instead of ASL, which delays a child's access to a natural sign language. Additionally, cognitive delays and lower academic achievement may result from or be exacerbated by a lack of complete or comprehensible input by teachers using MCE instead of ASL.

== Types ==
=== Used globally ===
==== Fingerspelling ====
Fingerspelling uses different signs for each letters of the alphabet. As with written versions of spoken language, certain linguistic and paralinguistic elements such as intonation are not represented. Although fingerspelling is not a form of MCE, but rather a feature borrowed from deaf sign languages, it is often the first 'point of contact' for a hearing person before learning the lexicon of a sign language. Fingerspelling is primarily used by Deaf people as a part of natural deaf sign languages, for some proper nouns, loanwords, for emphasis or distinction of relevant words, or when a signer is unsure of the signed equivalent of a spoken language word.

Exclusive fingerspelling is rarely used for communication. It still has some possible currency in some deafblind settings (see tactile signing). Exclusive fingerspelling has a place in the history of deaf education; in the US it is known as the Rochester method (see below). Elderly deaf people in the UK and Australia may also use a lot of fingerspelling relative to their younger counterparts as a result of their education.

Note that different regions use different manual alphabets to represent English – a two-handed system is used in the UK, Australia, and New Zealand, and one-handed systems are used in Canada and United States (see ASL alphabet), Ireland (see Irish Sign Language), Singapore and the Philippines. Both one and two-handed alphabets are used in South Africa. These English-speaking countries do not all have the same sign language either. See Sign language § not speech based.

==== Contact sign ====
Rather than being a form of MCE, contact sign is a blend of a local Deaf Sign Language and English. This contact language can take place anywhere on a continuum of intermediate stages, from very 'English-like' to very 'Deaf-language-like'; signers from these two different language backgrounds will often meet somewhere in the middle. Because of contact sign's standing as a bridge between two distinct languages, it is used differently by each individual depending on their knowledge of English and of the deaf sign language. The term contact sign has largely replaced the earlier name Pidgin Sign English (PSE) because this form of signing does not display the features linguists expect of a pidgin.

Contact sign drops the initializations and grammatical markers used in other forms of MCE, but retains basic English word order. In the US, ASL features often seen in contact sign include the listing of grouped items and the repetition of some pronouns and verbs.

==== Sign-supported speech, or simultaneous communication ====
Sign-supported speech (SSS) involves voicing everything as in spoken English, while simultaneously signing a form of MCE. The vocabulary, syntax and pragmatics of English are used, with the MCE signing serving as a support for the reception of speech. Signs are borrowed from the local deaf sign language and/or are artificial signs invented by educators of the deaf.

The terms SSS and SimCom are now often used synonymously with total communication (TC), though the original philosophy of TC is quite different.

==== Cued speech ====
Cued speech is not traditionally referred to as a form of MCE, in part because it does not use borrowed or invented signs in an attempt to convey English. Rather, cued speech employs the use of "cuems" (eight handshapes intended to represent consonant phonemes and four placements around the face intended to represent vowel phonemes, combined with mouth movements) to represent auditory elements of the language being cued in a visual manner. Cued languages are a distinct class of visual communication. Cued speech has been adapted for languages and dialects around the world.

=== In North America ===
==== Seeing Essential English/Morphemic Signing System ====
SEE-1 was the first American manual English code, developed in the 1960s and 70s by David Anthony, a teacher of deaf and disabled children. Anthony identified a list of proposed basic English words, less than half of which he identified American Sign Language (ASL) signs for, as well as a number of slightly different English words which ASL represented similarly with "only minor" stress and movement variations. Conversely, some English words could be expressed with multiple different ASL signs. Additionally, ASL, unlike English, is a zero copula language, so does not have lexical signs corresponding to English copulas like "is" and "are". In SEE1, all compound words are formed as separate signs – instead of using the ASL sign for "butterfly", SEE1 places the signs for "butter" and "fly" in sequential order. Many signs from ASL are initialized in SEE1 – the ASL sign for "have" is signed with the B handshape in SEE1. Nielson et al. argue that SEE-1/MSS is a poor representation of English because it has only 14 bound morphemes in its citation form, noting that it has not been well-studied since the 1990s, and as of the paper's publishing in 2016, was only in use in Amarillo, Texas.

==== Signing Exact English (SEE-2/SEE) ====
Signing Exact English (SEE) is the most commonly studied and taught manual code for American English. SEE incorporates a large number of signs which are borrowed from ASL. Signing exact English (SEE2) was developed by Gerilee Gustason, a deaf teacher of the deaf, Esther Zawolkow, a CODA and educational interpreter, and Donna Pfetzing, a parent of a deaf child, in the early 1970s. Where English differs lexically from ASL (such as concepts with multiple near-synonymous words in English but only one or two corresponding ASL signs) the handshape of the ASL sign was generally modified to reflect the first letter of the intended English word. Analogous variation in ASL (where multiple ASL signs all translate to a single English word) is not distinguished in SEE. For example in ASL, three distinct signs represent distinct meanings of English "right" ('correct,' 'opposite of left,' and 'entitlement') but SEE uses a single sign. Initializations and grammatical markers are also used in SEE2, but compound words with an equivalent ASL sign are used as the ASL sign, as with butterfly.

==== Signed English (SE) – American ====
The term 'Signed English' refers to a much simpler system than SEE1, SEE2, or LOVE. Signed English (occasionally referred to as Siglish) uses ASL signs in English word order, but only 14 grammatical markers. The most common method of Signed English in the US is that created by Harry Bornstein, who worked on the Gallaudet Signed English Project to develop children's books written in both illustrated signs and written English.

==== Linguistics of visual English (LOVE) ====
Linguistics of Visual English (LOVE) was the name of a morpheme list published by Dennis Wampler in 1971. While most forms of ASL and MCE are transcribed using English glosses, LOVE is written using the notation system developed by William Stokoe in describing the linguistic features of American Sign Language.

==== Conceptually accurate signed English (CASE) ====
CASE appears to be used to refer to different terms depending on context and/or author. The CDC describes CASE as another term for Pidgin Signed English, an older term for contact signing, and considers it a blend of ASL and other forms of MCE.

==== Rochester method ====
Perhaps the closest type of MCE to written English, the Rochester method involves fingerspelling every word. It was originated by Zenas Westervelt in 1878, shortly after he opened the Western New York Institute for Deaf-Mutes (presently known as the Rochester School for the Deaf). Use of the Rochester method continued until approximately the 1970s, and there are still deaf adults from the Rochester area who were taught with the Rochester method. It has fallen out of favor because it is a tedious and time-consuming process to spell everything manually, though it is still used in some deafblind settings (see tactile signing).

=== In the United Kingdom ===
==== Signed English (SE) – British ====
Signed English (SE) is one form of MCE used in Britain and refers to simultaneously speaking in English and signing. British Signed English borrows signs from British Sign Language and combines them with fingerspelling in order to include bound morphemes not used in BSL such as -ed and -ing.

The term is sometimes used interchangeably with Sign-supported English (see below) although others make a distinction.

==== Sign-supported English (SSE) ====
Sign-supported English (SSE) is differentiated from signed English (SE) by some scholars, who argue that SSE does not include the inflectional morphology required by spoken English; instead, "keywords" in sentences are signed while the complete sentence is spoken.

==== Paget Gorman sign system ====
The Paget Gorman Sign System, also known as Paget Gorman signed speech (PGSS) or Paget Gorman systematic sign language, was originated in Britain by Sir Richard Paget in the 1930s and developed further by Lady Grace Paget and Dr Pierre Gorman to be used with children with speech or communication difficulties, such as deaf children. It is a grammatical sign system which reflects normal patterns of English. The system uses 37 basic signs and 21 standard hand postures, which can be combined to represent a large vocabulary of English words, including word endings and verb tenses. The signs do not correspond to natural signs of the Deaf community.

The system was widespread in Deaf schools in the UK from the 1960s to the 1980s, but since the emergence of British Sign Language and the BSL-based Signed English in deaf education, its use is now largely restricted to the field of speech and language disorder.

=== Elsewhere ===
==== Signed English – Australia ====
They tend to follow a loose logic of sound rather than the strict phonetic structure of Cued Speech. For example, in Australian Signed English 'uncomfortable' is represented in signs meaning 'un', 'come', 'for', and 'table'. A visual sign taken from a deaf sign language may be generalised to represent homonyms of the English word – for example, the Auslan sign for a 'fly' (insect) may be used in Signed English for the verb (to) 'fly'.

In Australia, 'Signed English' was developed by a committee in the late 1970s, who took signs from Auslan (especially the southern dialect), invented new signs, and borrowed a number of signs from American Sign Language that have now made their way into everyday use in Auslan. It is still used in many schools. Australasian Signed English is also in use in New Zealand.

==== Singapore – SEE2 ====
Signing Exact English (SEE2) is widely used in deaf schools in Singapore, and is taught as the preferred form of sign language by the Singapore Association for the Deaf. The natural sign language used in Singapore, Singapore Sign Language, is thought to have been influenced by Shanghainese Sign Language, American Sign Language, and SEE2.

==== Kenya Signed English ====
The Kenyan government uses Kenya Signed English, though the University of Nairobi backs Kenyan Sign Language.

== See also ==
- Initialized sign
- Manually coded language
- Makaton
