= The Seaside Sleepover =

2025 novel by Jacqueline Wilson

- Author: Jacqueline Wilson
- Illustrator: Rachael Dean
- Language: English
- Genre: Children's novel
- Publisher: Puffin (first edition, hardback)
- Publication date: 27 March 2025
- Publication place: United Kingdom
- Media type: Print (hardback, Ebook & paperback) and audiobook)
- Pages: 416
- ISBN: 978-0241684115
- Preceded by: The Best Sleepover in the World

The Seaside Sleepover is a 2025 children's novel written by Jacqueline Wilson and illustrated by Rachael Dean. It is the third novel in Wilson's Sleepover series following Sleepovers (2001) and The Best Sleepover in the World (2023). It follows Daisy and her older disabled sister Lily as they look after a naughty dog, Scruff, and go on holiday to the seaside. Wilson travelled to several seaside towns and other events to promote the novel. The novel has been well-received by critics.

== Premise ==
Daisy is feeling bored during the summer holidays and longs for a holiday at the seaside. She and her older disabled sister Lily look after a naughty dog named Scruff whilst its elderly owner is in hospital. The sisters then go on holiday to the seaside with their parents and Lily's best friend Natalie after being invited by their Uncle Gary. They bring Scruff along with them.

== Release and promotion ==
The Seaside Sleepover was written by children's author Jacqueline Wilson and illustrated by freelance illustrator Rachael Dean. It is the third novel in Wilson's Sleepover series, following Sleepovers (2001) and The Best Sleepover in the World (2023). It was originally published in hardcover by Puffin Books and released on 27 March 2025. The novel's themes include overcoming challenges, friendship and family. Wilson has said that she loves "writing light-hearted fun books occasionally, especially when sisters Daisy and Lily are involved".

To celebrate the launch of the novel, Wilson travelled to seaside towns around the country. In May 2025, Wilson also visited and did a book-signing at Bramhall to celebrate the book's release, as well as an event at Wirral. That same month, Wilson and Dean promoted the event at an event in Kingston upon Hull.

In April 2025, Wilson also visited a Brownies organisation in North Thanet as a surprise during their sleepover to celebrate the launch of the book and the Brownie Book Reviewer badge. During the event, the children designed their own versions of the book's cover and gifted a signed copy of the novel. Wilson enjoyed the event and found it "wonderful" that the children seemed to enjoy the novel. A nine-year-old attendee at the event said, "I liked in the book when Daisy met a new friend and made a mermaid in the sand because that's something I would like to do". That same month, Wilson discussed the novel and answered questions about it at the 2025 Cambridge Literary Festival. Wilson also promoted the novel at the 2025 WayWord Festival. In February 2026, Wilson and Dean are set to discuss the novel at the Queen Elizabeth Hall in London.

== Reception ==
Pam Norfolk from the Lancashire Post praised the "heartwarming" novel, writing that "those all-too-familiar worries about bullying, disabilities, siblings and friendships" were also explored in this novel in addition to its predecessors. She also praised Dean's "beautifully emotive" illustrations and called the story "sensitively written and inspirational". Norfolk also said of the Sleepovers sequels, "With her gift for understanding and acknowledging the fears that so often affect children, and the subtle messages of help and guidance that flow from the pages, this is Wilson on her very best – and most entertaining – storytelling form". Tara Pahari from National World wrote that the Sleepovers series were "Full of relatable details and gentle confidence-building messages". A writer from The Week Junior put the novel on their list of "5 sequels you've been waiting for" and called the novel a "lovely story of family and friendship". Rebecca Butler from Books for Keeps praised Wilson's depiction of Lily as a "fully-rounded character and as a natural part of the story" and thought it was refreshing that Lily was aware of people's "mixed and sometimes prejudiced reactions to her", adding that it "is important for young readers to see you can convey anger without being verbal". Butler noted that the novel explores "accessibility challenges" but pointed out that the wheelchair and walker that is hired in the novel may not be as readily available in real life. Butler also praised Daisy and Lily's Uncle Gary, writing, "He has a drag act at the seaside and is so well loved by everyone that they wish they were related to him. Many readers may feel the same."
