= Pierre Gorman =

Australian librarian and academic (1924–2006)

Pierre Gorman CBE
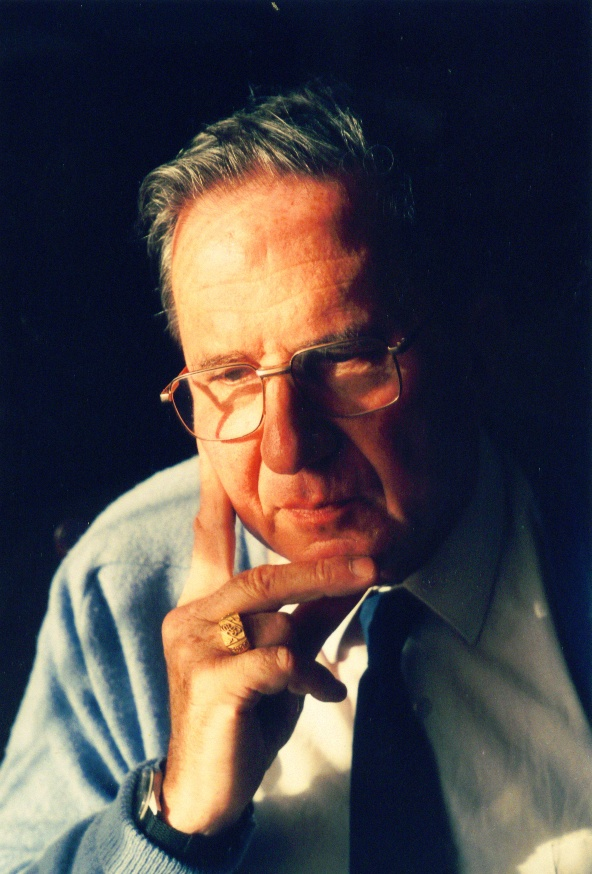
- Pierre Gorman at Cambridge in 1997
- Born: 1 October 1924; Melbourne, Australia
- Died: 1 October 2006 (aged 82)
- Known for: Paget Gorman Sign System

Academic background
- Education: University of Melbourne (B.S.A., B.Ed.); Corpus Christi College, Cambridge (PhD)

Academic work
- Discipline: Library scientist; Pedagogue

Pierre Patrick Gorman, CBE (1 October 1924 – 1 October 2006) was an Australian librarian and academic who specialised in education for children with disabilities. Gorman, born profoundly deaf, was the first deaf person to receive a doctorate at Cambridge University.

== Early life and education ==
Pierre Gorman was born in Melbourne, Australia, the only child of Sir Eugene Gorman, a barrister and soldier, and his French wife, Marthe Vallée, whom he had met while serving in France during World War I. Gorman was born profoundly deaf, and his parents resolved to ensure his education was as normal as possible. From the age of two, he was coached in speech and lip reading by two specialised teachers: Dr Henriette Hoffer (from the Centre Médico-Pédagogique in Paris) and Doreen Hugo (of the Victorian Deaf and Dumb Institution), with whom he learnt to lip-read and speak in both English and French. From the age of six, he attended Melbourne Church of England Grammar School.

In 1942, Gorman met the entrance requirements for the University of Melbourne, graduating in 1949 with a Bachelor of Agricultural Science degree and an Honours Diploma in Education, and with a Bachelor of Education degree in 1951. He then spent a year in Paris, where he studied the problems of children with disabilities, at Dr Hoffer's clinic. In 1952, he enrolled at Corpus Christi College at the University of Cambridge. Under the supervision of Robert H. Thouless, in 1960 he became the first deaf person to complete a PhD at Cambridge.

== Research and academia ==
After completion of his doctorate, Gorman remained in the United Kingdom, where he took the position of librarian and information officer at the Royal National Institute for Deaf People in London, where he expanded the institute's library to become one of the largest archives of deafness and hearing resources.

While at the RNID, Gorman began working with the anthropologist Sir Richard Paget to refine and develop a manually coded sign system, which Paget had originated in the 1930s. When Paget died in 1955, Gorman continued to work on developing and refining the system with Paget's widow, Lady Grace Paget. The system, which became known as the Paget Gorman Sign System, was widely used in the education of deaf children in Britain from the 1960s to the 1980s.

When Gorman returned to Australia, he took up a post at Monash University as a research fellow and lecturer in special education.

Pierre Gorman purchased an Airedale Terrier, Ch Tjuringa Paul, in 1970, and became active in the breed, enjoying Paul's success at dog shows. Gorman commissioned an Ogilvie bronze of Paul which today is displayed in the Education Faculty at Monash University.

== Honours and awards ==
In the 1983 New Year's Honours, Gorman was made a Commander of the Order of the British Empire (CBE) in the civil division, in recognition of service to disabled people.

The State Library of Victoria awards the biennial Pierre Gorman Award to Australian libraries or librarians for achievements in services and education to people with disabilities.
