= Paget Gorman Sign System =

Sign language system for the English language

The Paget Gorman Sign System, also known as Paget Gorman Signed Speech or Paget Gorman Systematic Sign Language, is a manually coded form of the English language, designed to be used with children with speech or communication difficulties.

== Development ==
The system was originally developed in Britain by anthropologist Sir Richard Paget in the 1930s, and later by his wife Lady Grace Paget and Dr Pierre Gorman. The system is founded on the notion that the original form of all speech is sign language and it has developed to the point that it features its own grammatical sign system. It has been distinguished when it was first proposed due to the way it introduced a degree of arbitrariness. It is also based on a classificatory system and uses 37 basic signs and 21 standard hand postures, which can be combined to represent a large vocabulary of English words, including word endings and verb tenses.

The system was widespread in Deaf schools in the UK from the 1960s to the 1980s, but since the emergence of British Sign Language and the BSL-based Signed English in deaf education, its use is now largely restricted to the field of speech and language disorder and is available if the learner has attended a course of instruction.

== See also ==
- Namibian Sign Language, a language that developed out of PGSS
- Makaton
