= R. Orin Cornett =

- Born: Richard Orin Cornett; November 13, 1913; Driftwood, Oklahoma, United States
- Died: December 7, 2002 (aged 89); Laurel, Maryland; United States
- Education: Oklahoma Baptist University (BS); University of Oklahoma (MS); University of Texas (Ph.D)
- Known for: Cued Speech
- Spouse: Lorene
- Children: Robert, Stanley, and Linda
- Scientific career
- Fields: physics; applied mathematics
- Workplaces: Gallaudet University; Oklahoma Baptist University; Penn State University; Harvard University
- Thesis: Acoustic Spectra of Edge Tones

R. Orin Cornett (November 13, 1913 – December 7, 2002) was an American physicist, university professor and administrator, and the inventor of a literacy system for the deaf, known as Cued Speech.

== Biography ==
R. (Richard) Orin Cornett was born in Driftwood, Oklahoma, a now unincorporated town near the Kansas border located in Alfalfa County, on November 14, 1913. He earned his BS degree in mathematics from Oklahoma Baptist University in 1934, followed by an MS from the University of Oklahoma in 1937. In 1940, Cornett was awarded a Ph.D. in physics and applied mathematics from the University of Texas at Austin, with his thesis entitled, “Acoustic Spectra of Edge Tones.” From 1935 to 1945, Dr. Cornett taught physics, mathematics, and electronics at Oklahoma Baptist, Penn State, and Harvard Universities.

In 1959, Cornett became the director of the Division of Higher Education at the U.S. Office of Education. While in that position, upon the review of funding for Gallaudet College (present-day Gallaudet University), he was appalled to discover that most deaf persons had below grade level reading skills and fail to achieve literacy at a native-level. In 1965, Cornett accepted a position as the Vice President for Long-Range Planning at Gallaudet. While serving there, he devised a phonemic system which rendered the English language visually, rather than acoustically, to address the issue of deaf literacy. He called this novel system Cued Speech. In 1971 his job title was changed to: "Vice President for Long Range Planning and Public Services" and during the 1970-1971 academic year he was the acting director of the Model Secondary School for the Deaf on the Gallaudet College campus. He was made a member of the faculty in 1966.

The invention of Cued Speech in 1966 opened a new field within deaf education. His Cued Speech system was based on the hypothesis that if all the sounds in the spoken language could clearly be made to look different from each other coming from the lips of the speaker, those who were hearing impaired would learn a language in much the same way as a hearing person, but through the use of their vision rather than acoustically. Of the system, Cornett stated, "A few months of study convinced me that the underlying cause of their (deaf persons) reading problem was the lack of any reasonable way to learn spoken language, without which they could not use speech for communication, become good lipreaders, or learn to read (as opposed to being taught the recognition of each written word). So, I really started with the conclusion that what was needed was a convenient way to represent the spoken language accurately, through vision, in real time. That was the problem I set out to solve, the perceived need that set my direction.”

From 1975 to 1984, he became research professor and director of Cued Speech Programs. From 1981 to 1983, he also served as Gallaudet's Chairman of the Center for Studies in Language and Communication. During Cornett's tenure there, he adapted his Cued Speech system to 52 languages and major dialects, while writing and publishing audiocassette lessons in 34 of those languages and dialects. Upon his retirement in 1984, Gallaudet University awarded him the status of professor emeritus. He continued working with the international Cued Speech community from his Maryland home after his retirement.

During his career, Cornett wrote and published hundreds of articles as well as several books on mathematics, physics, higher education, deaf education, Cued Speech and other subjects. He also served as editor of several publications, including the parental guidebook Cued Speech Resource Book for Parents of Deaf Children (ISBN 978-0963316417).

Cornett died on December 17, 2002, in Laurel, Maryland, at the age of 89. His wife of 59 years, Lorene, had died on January 21 of the same year.

== Recognition ==
Cornett's achievements include three honorary doctorates, the 1963 Award for Outstanding Alumni Achievement from Oklahoma Baptist University, the 1988 Nitchie Award in Human Communications from the New York League for the Hard of Hearing, and the Distinguished Service Award of the National Council on Communication Disorders awarded in 1992.

Cornett has been listed in the Marquis Who's Who in America continuously since 1956, and is also in Who’s Who in the World, Who Knows and What, American Men of Science, The Blue Book: Leaders of the English-Speaking World as well as several other biographical dictionaries.
