= Namibian Sign Language =

Sign Language

- Native to: Namibia, Angola
- Native speakers: 8,000 (2008)
- Language family: Paget Gorman: Namibian Sign Language

Language codes
- ISO 639-3: nbs
- Glottolog: nami1249

Namibian Sign Language (commonly abbreviated as NSL) is a sign language of Namibia and Angola. It is presumed that there are other sign languages in these countries.

The first school for the deaf was at Engela, and was established c. 1970 by the Evangelical Lutheran Church. The first teachers were black Namibians trained in South Africa, and used the Paget Gorman Sign System with Ovambo grammar. Students used the PGSS signs, but developed their own grammar.

In 1975 the South African government started a new school for the deaf at Eluwa. All children under 17 attending Engela were moved to Eluwa, and took their language with them. The Namibian exile community in Angola included a number of students from these schools, and in 1982 a school for the deaf was set up for them in Angola, where they taught NSL to new students.

Namibian Sign has been influenced by both American Sign Language and Swedish Sign Language.

A speaker of Namibian Sign Language.
