= Sir Richard Paget, 2nd Baronet =

British barrister and amateur scientific investigator

- Born: Richard Arthur Surtees Paget; 13 January 1869; Cranmore, Somerset, England
- Died: 23 October 1955 (aged 86); Knightsbridge, London, England
- Occupations: Barrister, amateur scientist
- Known for: Paget Gorman Sign System
- Spouse(s): Lady Muriel Finch-Hatton (1897–1938; her death); Grace Hartley Glover (1939–1955; his death)
- Parent(s): Sir Richard Paget, 1st Baronet and Caroline Surtees

Sir Richard Arthur Surtees Paget, 2nd Baronet (13 January 1869 – 23 October 1955) was a British barrister and amateur scientific investigator, who specialised in speech science and the origin of speech. Following the publication of his book on these topics, Human Speech, in 1930, Paget worked for the remaining decades of his life on a new type of signing system for the deaf, which became the Paget Gorman Sign System.

== Early life and education ==
Paget was born in 1869 at Cranmore Hall, Somerset. His father was Sir Richard Paget, 1st Baronet, a Conservative member of parliament; his mother was Caroline Isabel Surtees, the daughter of Henry Surtees, another MP, of County Durham. He was educated at Eton College, and then at Magdalen College, Oxford, where he received a third-class degree in chemistry. He succeeded his father as Paget Baronet in 1908.

== Legal career ==
Paget was called to the bar as a barrister at the Inner Temple in 1895. His sharp legal and scientific mind saw him appointed to a number of legal commissions, boards and committees, including the London Court of Arbitration, the Patent Law Committee, and the Admiralty Board of Invention and Research.

== Amateur scientist ==
Educated as a chemist and having worked as a physicist, Paget held a deep interest in various fields of science. He was also well-versed in music and the arts (and had written several songs as well as constructed his own musical instruments), but his reputation was that of an "eccentric amateur" scientist.

Sir Richard's daughter, Pamela Paget (later Lady Glenconner), was often a subject of his experiments. Pamela's nephew and Sir Richard's grandson, Alexander Chancellor, wrote in his "Long Life" column in The Spectator that Pamela had broken her arm when Sir Richard encouraged her to throw herself backwards from the open platform of a London bus on Park Lane to demonstrate his theory that, due to air currents, one could fall horizontally from a bus travelling at a certain speed and land safely on the road. According to Lady Glenconner's obituary in The Telegraph, Sir Richard had also filled his daughters' ears with treacle (to simulate deafness) while testing his sign language system.

=== Speech and sign language ===
Sir Richard's most enduring legacy was his research into the nature of human speech and communication. While he made contributions to several branches of the field from phonetics and vocalisation to linguistics and vocabulary, it was his theories on the origin of speech and the "pantomimic action" of the lips and tongue being related to the speaker's senses and emotions that led to his central thesis that hand signs and gestures were the original form of human communication, and that humans had evolved to communicate vocally as their "hands [were] full". His book on these ideas, Human Speech, was published in 1930, and was re-issued in 1964 due to its connections with later developments in communication engineering. The Irish author James Joyce was a close follower of Paget's research, and his works and those of Marcel Jousse were influential in Joyce's study and use of language.

In the 1930s, Sir Richard began developing a manually coded sign language system. He collaborated with the librarian at the Royal National Institute for the Deaf, Pierre Gorman, to develop the system further. Upon his death in 1955, his widow, Lady Grace Paget, continued the work with Gorman, and the resulting Paget Gorman Sign System was widely used in the education of deaf children in Britain from the 1960s to the 1980s.

== Marriage and children ==
Paget was married twice. His first marriage was to Lady Muriel Evelyn Vernon Finch-Hatton (daughter of Murray Finch-Hatton, 12th Earl of Winchilsea) on 31 May 1897; they had three daughters and two sons (one of whom died as an infant). His youngest child, John Starr Paget (1914–1992), succeeded him in the Paget Baronetcy as the 3rd Baronet.

Lady Muriel died in 1938 of cancer and exhaustion. On 22 July 1939, Sir Richard married Grace Hartley Glover; they had no children.

Baronetage of the United Kingdom
Preceded by Richard Paget	Baronet (of Cranmore, Somerset); 1908–1955	Succeeded by John Paget
