= Signing Exact English =

Manual communication system

Signing Exact English (SEE-II, sometimes Signed Exact English) is a system of manual communication that strives to be an exact representation of English language vocabulary and grammar. It is one of a number of such systems in use in English-speaking countries. It is related to Seeing Essential English (SEE-I), a manual sign system created in 1945, based on the morphemes of English words. SEE-II models much of its sign vocabulary from American Sign Language (ASL), but modifies the handshapes used in ASL in order to use the handshape of the first letter of the corresponding English word.

SEE-II is not considered a language itself like ASL; rather it is an invented system for a language—namely, for English.

== History ==
Before 1970, Deaf children had access to "oral-only" education, where teachers and other adults did not use sign in the classroom. Around the early 1970s, sign began to be used more as an educational tool in "total communication" classrooms. ASL had only recently been recognized as a language and forms of Manually Coded English had just been invented. Three main reasons served as grounds for the invention of Manually Coded English, Signing Exact English (SEE), in particular. At the time, there was dissatisfaction with the levels of educational achievement of Deaf children, as difficulties with syntax and morphology were limiting their writing skills. In addition, a discrepancy between hearing and Deaf children in regards to knowledge of normal language development was noted. Lastly, concerns rose in regards to speech reading and the ambiguities of relying solely on speech reading. With growing concern over the low levels of literacy and other academic skills attained by the majority of Deaf students, manually coded sign systems began to develop. The first manual English System (SEE-I) was developed by David Anthony, a Deaf teacher, with input from other Deaf educators as well as parents of Deaf children. This is known today as the Morphemic Sign Systems (MSS). This system was viewed as inadequate by other members of Anthony's team and Gerilee Gustason, a Deaf woman and Deaf educator, along with other members of the original SEE-I team developed SEE-II. SEE-II was devised to give Deaf and hard of hearing children the same English communicative potential as their typically hearing peers. First published in 1972 by Gustasen, Pfetzing, and Zawolkow, SEE-II matches visual signs with the grammatical structure of English. Unlike ASL, which is a real language and has its own unique grammar system, SEE-II is intended to be an exact visual model of spoken English and allows children with hearing loss to access grammatically correct English, just as all hearing children receive in educational settings. SEE employs English word order, the addition of affixes and tenses, the creation of new signs not represented in ASL and the use of initials with base signs to distinguish between related English words. SEE-II is available in books and other materials. SEE-II includes roughly 4,000 signs, 70 of which are common word endings or markers. In comparison to Signed English, SEE-II involves more advanced motoric and cognitive functions.

== Handshapes ==
Handshapes are one of the four components of a sign and convey a large amount of information about each sign. The two types of signs are static and dynamic. Dynamic signs involve hand movement and the handshape can remain the same or can change from one handshape to another. Usually only the handshapes at the start and end of a dynamic sign are important to understanding the meaning of each sign. There have been about 30-40 handshapes defined in SEE and they have many similarities to those of ASL.

=== SEE-II vs ASL Handshapes ===
ASL is a complete, unique language, meaning that it not only has its own vocabulary but its own grammar and syntax that differs from spoken English. SEE-II is not a true language but rather a system of gestural signs that rely on the signs from language of ASL to communicate in English through signs and fingerspelling. The vocabulary of SEE-II is a combination of ASL signs, modified ASL signs, or unique English signs. The reason SEE-II signs vary from ASL is to add clarity so that the exact English word meant for the conversation is understood. For example- the sign for "car" in ASL is two "S" hands gesturing as if they are holding onto and moving a steering wheel. This is the same sign used for any automobile controlled by a steering wheel. In SEE-II, "car" is signed by two C hands, one on top of the other, moving away from each other. To specify another vehicle, the hand shape is modified to include the first initial of the type of vehicle (e.g., V for "van", B for "bus", J for "jeep", etc.). This is called an initialized sign- the meaning of the sign is clarified by initializing the sign with the first letter of the intended English word. This allows the signer to specify exactly what they want to communicate in English.

== Uses ==
Because SEE-II is a manual version of spoken English, SEE-II and its variants may be easy for English speakers to learn. Currently, the average Deaf or hard-of-hearing student graduating from high school reads at approximately the third- or fourth-grade level. SEE-II has been used in hopes of promoting reading skills in Deaf students. Children who grew up on SEE-II are now in their 20s and 30s and members of the Deaf Community. A small survey of 46 former students of a school in the Northwest of America that uses SEE indicated that many graduated from high school and attended college. Many graduate from college and obtain jobs, live independently (78.8%), drive (93.3%), and vote (88.9%). About 15% of the participants in this study receive Supplemental Security Income. The advocacy group Hands & Voices argues that SEE-II is easy for English speaking parents and teachers of Deaf children to master because they do not have to learn a new grammar, and that it provides support for individuals who utilize cochlear implants, helping them match the SEE-II handshapes that they see with the hearing and speaking that they utilize.

== Research ==
The use of Signing Exact English has been controversial but in 2012 was suggested by Dr. Marc Marschark (editor of Deaf Studies and Deaf Education) as a viable support to listening, speech, English language, and reading in the schools. Some deaf people find SEE to be difficult to efficiently perceive and produce. Deaf Community members born in the 1980s were most often raised on some form of signing and speaking and do so in their adult lives. Because unlike coded manual forms of English, such as SEE-II, ASL is a naturally-evolved language, it is vitally important for children who use SEE to have opportunities to learn ASL as well. However, it is advocated by some educators as a way of providing deaf children with access to a visual form of the English language. There is research published in the Journal of Deaf Studies in Deaf Education in 2013 to evidence that SEE serves as the home language for many families although it is technically a system of communication. It allows signers to drop word medial morphemes after they can be both spoken and signed by students. For example, the sign for examination is produced with two signs: EXAM + -TION. The system assumes that since examtion is not a word in English the observer will fill in the missing parts, and students demonstrate this through their intelligible speech daily in programs where SEE is used (Northwest School for Hearing-Impaired Children in the Seattle area). Thus, the SEE-II user must first be familiar with English in order to discern the correct form. Young children must be taught which signs have incomplete English morphemic representations just as occurs when children learn to read English writing systems, just are incomplete at time but serve a valuable purpose (as does SEE). Additionally, for use of figurative language, signs must literally translate from spoken English to Signed Exact English. To learn more about SEE and its effectiveness, read the most current research available in the two major journals in the field of Deaf Education.

Another argument against SEE-II is that it may not be the most efficient form of communication. ASL proponents argue that SEE-II takes the direct communications method used in the grammatical structure of American Sign Language (ASL) and fills it with English-based prepositions and articles that slow down communication and make it more difficult for the communicative partners to follow along. They believe that SEE-II may be a tool for teaching English but should be limited to classroom environments.

== Educational controversy ==
In the United States, about two-thirds of teachers who have deaf or hard of hearing students instruct with some sort of sign language or manually coded system; this can include ASL, SEE-II, SEE-I, or Signed/Manual English, or a combination thereof. The debate is whether SEE-II benefits children enough to justify its teaching in place of ASL which is only used by 6% of children today. Proponents of SEE-II demonstrate through research that the system is useful in helping children learn to listen, speak, understand and use English as well as read and write English as do their same-age peers. They further claim that SEE-II can exist as a practical alternative to ASL without hindering the learning of ASL, because it is easier to learn for native verbal English speakers, such as individuals with partial hearing loss or no hearing impairment. Opponents point to the logistical disadvantages of trying to promote the mainstream use of a manually coded system, which is not a real language, and dispute that SEE-II offers advantages to warrant educational resources which could be put toward encouraging universal adoption of ASL.

== See also ==
- Total Communication
- Paget Gorman Signed Speech
- Cued Speech
