= Contact sign =

Language arising from contact between deaf people

A contact sign language, or contact sign, is a variety or style of language that arises from contact between deaf individuals using a sign language and hearing individuals using an oral language (or the written or manually coded form of the oral language). Contact languages also arise between different sign languages, although the term pidgin rather than contact sign is used to describe such phenomena.

Contact sign has been characterized as "a sign language that has elements of both [a] natural sign language and the surrounding [oral] language".

== Language contact ==
Language contact is extremely common in most Deaf communities, which are almost always located within a dominant oral language ('hearing') culture. Deaf people are exposed to the oral language that surrounds them, if only in visual forms like lip reading or writing, from early childhood. Within everyday life it is not uncommon for Deaf people to be in contact with oral languages. Hearing parents and teachers of deaf children, if they sign at all, are usually second language learners, and their signing style will exhibit features of interference from the oral language. A mixing of languages and modes may also occur when interpreting between a spoken and a sign language.

While deaf sign languages are distinct from spoken languages, with a different vocabulary and grammar, a boundary between the two is often hard to draw. A language 'continuum' is often described between signing with a strong sign-language grammar to signing with a strong spoken-language grammar, the middle-regions of which are often described as contact sign (or Pidgin Sign). In a conversation between a native signer and a second-language learner, both conversation partners may be signing at different ends of the spectrum. A blend that is often seen is vocabulary from the sign language signed in the word order of the oral language, with a simplified or reduced grammar typical of contact languages. We can recognize that the speaking habits of an English speaker learning French for the first time will differ from those of a native French speaker. The same thing happens when a hearing individual is learning a sign language.

However, even a dialogue between two native deaf signers often shows some evidence of language contact. Deaf people in the United States may use a more English-like signing style in a more formal setting, or if unfamiliar with the interlocutor.

Huenerfauth claims that Pidgin Signed English, as well as contact languages, can create accessibility benefits for users of sign language who have lower levels of written literacy, while Ceil Lucas explains how contact also occurs when deaf signers modify their language for the sake of hearing people who are in the process of learning to use a sign language.

== Linguistic features of language contact ==
Sign language researchers Ceil Lucas and Clayton Valli have noted several differences between the language contact arising between two sign languages and the contact phenomena that arise between a signed and an oral language.

When two sign languages meet, the expected contact phenomena occurs: lexical borrowing, foreign "accent", interference, code switching, pidgins, creoles and mixed systems. However, between a sign language and an oral language, lexical borrowing and code switching also occur, but the interface between the oral and signed modes produces unique phenomena: fingerspelling (see below), fingerspelling/sign combination, initialisation, CODA talk (see below), TTY conversation, mouthing, and contact signing.

Long-term contact with oral languages has generated a large influence on the vocabulary and grammar of sign languages. Loan translations are common, such as the American Sign Language signs BOY and FRIEND, forming a compound meaning "boyfriend" or the Auslan partial-calque DON'T MIND, which involves the sign for the noun MIND combined with an upturned palm, which is a typical Auslan negation. When a loan translation becomes fully acceptable and considered as 'native' (rather than Contact Signing) is a matter over which native signers will differ in opinion.

The process appears to be very common in those sign languages that have been best documented, such as American Sign Language, British Sign Language and Auslan. In all of the cases, signers are increasingly bilingual in both a sign and a "spoken" language (or visual forms of it) as the deaf signing community's literacy levels increase. In such bilingual communities, loan translations are common enough that deeper grammatical structures may also be borrowed from the oral language, which is known as metatypy. Malcolm Ross writes:

Usually, the language undergoing metatypy (the modified language) is emblematic of its speakers' identity, whilst the language which provides the metatypic model is an inter-community language. Speakers of the modified language form a sufficiently tightknit community to be well aware of their separate identity and of their language as a marker of that identity, but some bilingual speakers, at least, use the inter-community language so extensively that they are more at home in it than in the emblematic language of the community.

Some populations with a high proportion of deaf people have developed sign languages that are used by both hearing and deaf people in the community, such as Martha's Vineyard Sign Language, Yucatec Maya Sign Language, Adamorobe Sign Language and Al-Sayyid Bedouin Sign Language. It is unclear what kind of language contact phenomena, if any, occur in such environments.

== Fingerspelling ==
One of the most striking contact sign phenomena is fingerspelling in which a writing system is represented with manual signs. In the sign languages with such a system, the manual alphabet is structurally quite different from the more 'native' grammatical forms, which are often spatial, visually motivated, and multilayered. Manual alphabets facilitate the input of new terms such as technical vocabulary from the dominant oral language of the region and allow a transliteration of phrases, names, and places. They may also be used for function words such as 'at', 'so' or 'but'.

== Pidgin Sign English ==
The phrase Pidgin Sign English (PSE, sometimes also 'Pidgin Signed English') is often used to describe the different contact languages that arise between the English language and any of British Sign Language, New Zealand Sign Language, Auslan or American Sign Language. However, that term is falling out of favour. Pidgin Signed English generally refers to a combination of American Sign Language and the English language. Individuals who are hard of hearing, or become deaf later on in life, after using Spoken English, may often use a mixture of ASL and English, which is known as PSE. With PSE, it is common to sign most English words of a sentence, using English grammar and syntax, using ASL signs.

When communicating with hearing English speakers, ASL-speakers often use PSE. Various types of PSE exist, ranging from highly English-influenced PSE (practically relexified English) to PSE which is quite close to ASL lexically and grammatically, but may alter some subtle features of ASL grammar. Fingerspelling may be used more often in PSE than it is normally used in ASL.

== Reverse phenomenon by children of deaf adults ==
Contact phenomena have been observed in the reverse direction, from a sign language to an oral language. Hearing adults who grew up in deaf signing households as children of deaf adults (CODAs) sometimes communicate with one another in spoken and written English and knowingly use ASL loan translations and underlying grammatical forms.

== See also ==
- Bimodal bilingualism
- Manually Coded English
