= Trillium Charter School =

K–12 school in Portland, Oregon, United States

Location
- 5420 N Interstate Avenue; Portland, (Multnomah County), Oregon 97217; United States; 45.562117°N 122.681920°W

Information
- Type: Charter
- School district: formerly Portland Public Schools
- Grades: K–12
- Enrollment: 318 (2017–18)
- Website: www.trilliumcharterschool.org

Trillium Charter School was a K–12 school located in Portland, Oregon, United States.

In February 2019, Portland Public Schools revoked the school's charter. The school had failed to provide accurate financial statements and had failed to meet an improvement plan to increase academic competence.

== Academics ==
In 2008, 55% of the school's seniors received a high school diploma. Of 20 students, 11 graduated, five dropped out, and four were still in high school the following year. In 2016, 70% of Trillium's students graduated on time out of a class size of 23.
