= Kisii School for the Deaf =

- Kisii, Kisii County; Kenya

Information
- Founder: Peter Ogango

Kisii School for Deaf Children is Kenya's only Deaf-run and deaf-led school for deaf children. Founded by Peter Ogango, the school is based in Kisii town, the capital of Kisii County in southwestern Kenya.
