= Makaton =

System to support personal communication

Makaton is an augmentative and alternative communication (AAC) system which uses signs (hand gestures) and symbols (images) alongside speech and written words to support communication. Despite its use of signs, Makaton is not a sign language.

Makaton is used by hearing people with communication challenges and learning disabilities to communicate and is proven to support the development of essential communication skills such as attention, listening, comprehension, memory and expressive speech and language. The Makaton Communication Programme has been used with individuals who have cognitive impairments, autism, Down syndrome, specific language impairment, multisensory impairment and acquired neurological disorders that have negatively affected the ability to communicate, including stroke and dementia patients.

The name "Makaton" is derived from the names of three members of the original teaching team at Botleys Park Hospital in Chertsey, Surrey: Margaret Walker (the designer of the programme and speech therapist at Botleys Park), Katherine Johnston and Tony Cornforth (psychiatric hospital visitors from the Royal Association for Deaf People).

Makaton is a registered trademark of The Makaton Charity, which was established in 2007 to replace the original charitable trust, the Makaton Vocabulary Development Project, established in 1983. The original trademark application for Makaton was filed in Britain on 28 August 1979, with registration approved as from that date under trademark registration no. 1119745.

== Programme ==
The Makaton Communication Programme uses a multimodal approach to support communication, language and, where appropriate literacy skills, through a combination of speech, signs, and graphic symbols used concurrently, or, only with speech with signs, or, only with speech with graphic symbols as appropriate for the Makaton user's needs. It consists of a Core Vocabulary of roughly 450 concepts that are taught in a specific order which broadly follows the pattern of natural language acquisition in eight stages. For example, stage one involves teaching vocabulary for immediate needs, like "eat" and "drink".

Later stages contain signs and symbols for more complex and abstract vocabulary such as time concepts and emotions. Once basic communication has been established, the user can progress in their Makaton use, using whatever modes are most appropriate. Also, although the programme is organised in stages, it can be modified and tailored to the individual's needs. In addition to the Core Vocabulary, there is a Makaton Resource Vocabulary of signs and symbols for over 11,000 concepts.

== Development ==
Original research was conducted by Margaret Walker in 1972/73, and resulted in the design of the Makaton Core Vocabulary based on functional need. This research was conducted with institutionalised deaf cognitively impaired adults resident at Botleys Park Hospital in Chertsey, Surrey (which closed in 2008). The aim was to enable them to communicate using signs borrowed from British Sign Language. Fourteen deaf and cognitively impaired adults participated in the pilot study, and all were able to learn to use manual signs; improved behaviour was also noted. Shortly after, the Core Vocabulary was revised to include both children and adults with severe communication difficulties (including individuals who could hear), and was used in many schools throughout Britain in order to stimulate communication and language.

In the early stages of development, Makaton used only speech and manual signs (without symbols). By 1985, work had begun to include graphic symbols in the Makaton Language Programme and a version including graphic symbols was published in 1986. The Core Vocabulary was revised in 1986 to include additional cultural concepts.

The Makaton Vocabulary Development Project was founded in 1976 by Margaret Walker, who worked in a voluntary capacity as director until her retirement in October 2008. The first Makaton training workshop was held in 1976 and supporting resources and further training courses were, and continue to be, developed. In 1983 the Makaton Vocabulary Development Project became a charitable trust, and in 2007 it changed its status to become the Makaton Charity.

== Use ==
Makaton is used extensively across Britain and has been adapted for use in different countries; signs from each country's deaf community are used, along with culturally relevant Makaton symbols. For example, within Britain, Makaton uses signs from British Sign Language; the signs are mainly from the London and South East England regional dialect.

Makaton has also been adapted for use in over 40 countries, including France, Greece, Japan, Kuwait and the Gulf, Russia, South Africa and Switzerland. Using signs from each country's own existing sign language ensures that they reflect each country's unique culture and also provide a bank of further signs if required for use with Makaton.

In 1991 The Makaton Charity produced a video/DVD of children's familiar nursery rhymes, signed, spoken and sung by a well-known children's TV presenter, Dave Benson Phillips, who had previously used Makaton with poems and rhymes in the Children's BBC show Playdays. The aim was for it to be enjoyed by children with developmental disabilities and their peers and siblings. Following this major success, in 2003 it became a significant part of the BBC's Something Special programmes on the CBeebies programme thread, presented by Justin Fletcher as "Mr Tumble", which has won numerous awards and is now into its thirteenth series.

On 16 November 2018, comedian Rob Delaney read a book on the BBC's children's channel CBeebies entirely in Makaton and English; he had used Makaton to communicate with his late son Henry, who was rendered unable to talk after a tracheotomy.

== Criticism ==
Members of the Deaf community, including the British Deaf Association, have been critical of Makaton. A 2022 statement by the British Deaf Association decried the rapid growth of social media posts using "sign supported communication systems" such as Makaton and Signalong, emphasizing the limited nature of these non-languages. The statement argued that it would make more sense to teach both hearing and deaf children signs from British Sign Language, enabling them to communicate with the Deaf community.

The British Deaf Association and The Makaton Charity then collaborated and released a joint statement on Makaton and British Sign Language (BSL) which concluded that Makaton and BSL have distinct roles in their respective and different communities; BSL and ISL as the natural languages of the Deaf community in the UK and Makaton as a supportive communication system for those with learning or communication challenges. Acknowledging the significance of both, The Makaton Charity and the BDA work collaboratively to support their respective communities effectively and to promote understanding and inclusivity.

Scholarly critique of Makaton has included questioning of its methodology of sign selection and usage, and suggestions that the "teaching method and vocabulary structure were highly restrictive and, if not revised, might impede communication skill development with some children."

Other considerations focus on the proprietary nature of Makaton, believing that protecting the integrity of the signs and symbols with copyright restricts access to Makaton.
