= National Deaf Children's Society =

British charity

- Founded: 15 December 1944
- Registration no.: England & Wales (1016532) Scotland (SC040779)
- Location: Ground Floor South, Castle House, 37- 45 Paul Street, London EC2A 4LS
- Origins: London, England
- Website: www.ndcs.org.uk

The National Deaf Children's Society (NDCS) is a British charity dedicated to providing support, information and advice for deaf children and young people, their families and professionals working with them. The Society campaigns for improvements in services aimed at families with deaf children, working with central and local government, health authorities, education professionals, social services, manufacturers and other voluntary organizations. Its headquarters are located in London, with regional offices in Birmingham, Belfast (NDCS Northern Ireland), Cardiff (NDCS Wales) and Glasgow (NDCS Scotland).

== History ==
NDCS was founded as the Society of St John of Beverley and was renamed the Deaf Children's Society in 1945. It adopted its current name in the 1950s. At its established its objective was 'to further in every way possible the provision of full modern education for all deaf children in England, as originally accorded to hearing children'.

The National Deaf Children's Society was founded in London on 15 December 1944 by a handful of parents of deaf children concerned about the impact of the Education Act 1944 on their schooling.

2002 saw the merger of NDCS with Friends for Young Deaf People, resulting in the creation of the NDCS youth wing. The merger allows NDCS to provide a service supporting families with deaf children from birth to 25.

The leadership have resisted attempts by their staff to unionise despite it being what the staff overwhelmingly wish for. The charity has repeatedly been linked to exploitative practices involving door-to-door and street reps, including failing to guarantee its reps a minimum wage and employing tactics to "trick" donors.

== See also ==
- Audism, discrimination against Deaf and hard-of-hearing people
- National Association of the Deaf (NAD)
- IFHOHYP International Federation of Hard of Hearing Young People
- Post-lingual deafness
- Pre-lingual deafness
- Royal National Institute for Deaf People
- Youth hearing conservation programs
