= NAD =

NAD or Nad may refer to:

== Geography ==
- Nad, County Cork, a village in Ireland
- Nanggroe Aceh Darussalam, a region in Sumatra
- North American Datum, a series of geographic coordinate systems
- North Atlantic Drift, an Atlantic Ocean current
- Hobli, a subdivision of a taluka in southern India

== Organizations ==
- National Academy of Design
- NAD Electronics, a Canadian audio equipment manufacturer (originally New Acoustic Dimension)
- National Advertising Division, the Council of Better Business Bureaus in the United States and Canada
- National Appeals Division, an agency within the United States Department of Agriculture
- National Association of the Deaf (disambiguation), one of several associations for deaf people
- Norwegian Association of the Disabled

== Science, medicine and technology ==
- Na D, a spectroscopic line due to sodium
- Network Access Device, a device in mobile phones that finds the shortest route for a connection
- Nicotinamide adenine dinucleotide, a coenzyme and signaling molecule
- No acute distress, on physical exam
- Noradrenalin, a hormone and neurotransmitter
- Nucleolar-associating domains (NADs); regions of the chromosome that interact with the nucleolus

== Other uses ==
- Namibian dollar, the currency of Namibia
- Nađ, a Serbian-language surname
- Nad (surname), an East Slavic-language transliteration of a Hungarian surname
