= Nadj =

Nadj is a surname. It may be a transliteration variant the Hungarian surname Nagy and some other surnames derived from "Nagy" in other languages (Nađ, Nad, etc.).

Notable people with this surname include:

- Alexander Nadj, Swedish footballer
- Melinda Nadj Abonji, Hungarian-Swiss writer, musician, and performance artist
- Sebastian Nadj (born 1997), Serbian Greco-Roman wrestler
- Josef Nadj, dancer and choreographer
