= Samuel Lane (painter) =

English painter

- Born: 26 July 1780; King's Lynn, England
- Died: 29 July 1859 (aged 79); Ipswich, England
- Education: Joseph Farington, Royal Academy Schools, Sir Thomas Lawrence
- Known for: oil portrait-painter
- Awards: Royal Academy

Samuel Lane (1780–1859) was a deaf English portrait-painter, who trained under Joseph Farington and Thomas Lawrence, where he learned to paint in the style of Joshua Reynolds in a career that lasted through the golden age of British painting. Lane lived and worked out of Greek Street in London for most of his professional life, exhibiting at the Royal Academy of Arts (RA) every year for fifty years of his professional life (1804-1857).

== Early life ==
Samuel Lane was born on the 26th of July 1780, the eldest child of Elizabeth (née Mayhew) and Samuel Lane (snr), who had been the Collector of Customs at the Port of King’s Lynn in Norfolk. At the age of six, Lane almost drowned after falling into water whilst attempting to board a small boat. When he regained consciousness, Lane was found to be profoundly deaf, which thereafter also impaired his speech. (Note: he was often described by contemporaries as partially dumb or unable to speak clearly.) As he was not prelingually deaf, Lane would have been encouraged to express himself orally, relying on lip reading and facial expression. Many families with deaf children in the Eighteenth century did create their own home signs for communication and if they had the money, could hire private tutors for their children. Lane showed a talent for painting at an early age and with his focus on facial expression, portraiture became his calling, actively encouraged by his father.

At the age of seventeen in 1797, Lane travelled with his father to London, where he was enrolled to study portraiture under Joseph Farington at 35 Charlotte Street, Farington’s studio. In 1800, Lane is listed as a student at the Royal Academy Schools but in the same year, Farington's wife died. Farington collapsed and never regained “the fire” that inspired him to paint, leaving him incapable of painting or drawing. Farington was encouraged, however, by Lane’s potential and so he approached Thomas Lawrence to continue Lane’s tutelage for twelve months. (Note: Farington continued to advise and champion Lane's career as an artist for the rest of his (Farington's) life) Lawrence readily agreed after seeing Lane’s work and the following year, Lane remained with Lawrence and was soon being paid to make copies of portraits on commission. By February 1802, Lawrence employed him as an assistant at his studio at 60, Greek Street, where Lane was to remain for most of the next fifty years.

== Career ==
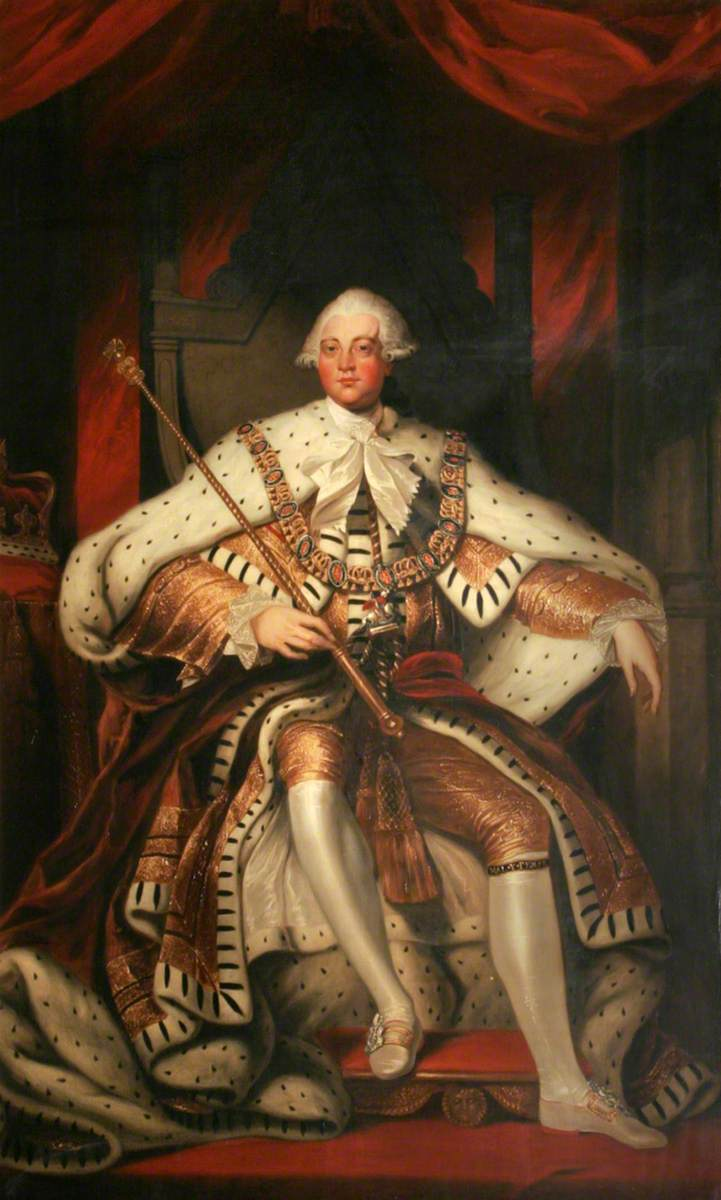
Lane’s copy of Lawrence's George III, 1809

Lane continued working out of Greek Street as an assistant to Lawrence in 1803, whilst doing some extra work for John Hoppner, which created tensions with Lawrence. Lane was experimenting with his own work at the same time, encouraged by Farington, who recommended that he apply to exhibit at the Royal Academy. Lane first exhibited at the Royal Academy in 1804, and was a constant contributor for more than fifty years thereafter, exhibiting in all 217 works at the Royal Academy, much of it out of Lawrence's studios in Greek Street. Being one of Lawrence's assistants had benefits but Lane needed to supplement his income because Lawrence failed to give him the regular work that he needed to be truly financially independent. (Note: Despite having several assistants in his employ over this period, Lawrence was famously overwhelmed with commissions and referred his less prominent clients to Lane, providing Lane with the opportunity to build his own client base) In 1806, Lane wrote "I go on badly with Mr. Lawrence. He does not employ me in a regular way and I lose much time in consequence of his being undetermined how to employ me". By 1807, sharing Lawrence's frustration and the financial repercussions of late or non-payment of commissions, Lane was eventually able to supplement his income by copying for both Lawrence and Hopper.

For the next ten years, Lane alternated between working with Lawrence at his studios and freelancing at his own studios close by, combining commissions of his own work whilst occasionally copying for Lawrence. (Note: Lane worked from 57, Greek Street from 1813, but the Rate Books transcriptions available to public do not record the street number but we know he had returned to 60 Greek Street in 1820.) Lawrence's relationship with Lane continued to be strained, partly because simple practical communication of deep artistic adjustments with Lane was challenging, and partly because Lane was assisting other artists like Hoppner. Neither took the other for granted, with Lane asking Farington to petition Lawrence for work on his behalf. Lane did, however, continue to assist Lawrence and became his chief assistant, making a fine copy of his portrait of George III in 1809, and in 1810, Lawrence recommended him for a commission of the Duke of Queensberry, who had just died. Lawrence always had difficulty keeping up with his commissions and Lane helped him by taking on his less prominent clients as well as clients less inclined to pay Lawrence’s high fees. Both men remained in financial difficulties throughout their professional careers despite being prodigiously hard working. (Note: Lane wrote to Farington in 1812 "I have lived for three months successively, upon tea and bread and butter only, at my own expense, never having ate animal food but occasionally when invited by some friend to his table.") Not long after, Lawrence embarked on a postponed trip to the Continent in 1818, while Lane moved back into his studios.

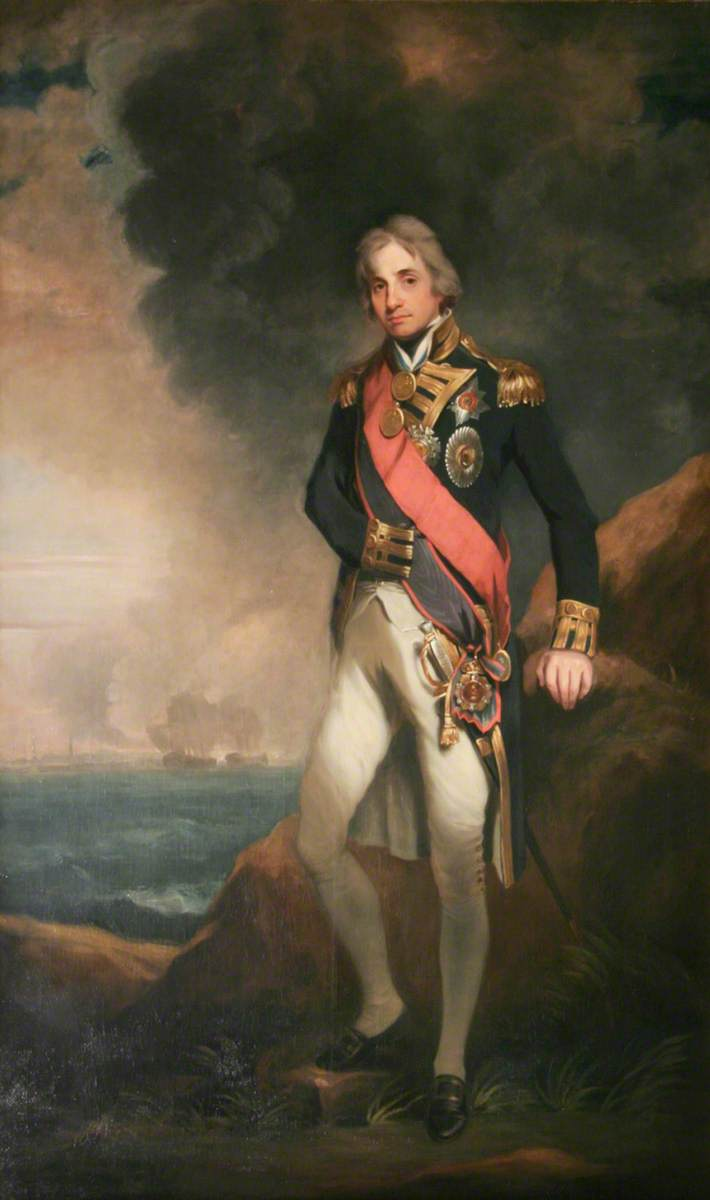
Lane's copy of Hoppner's Lord Nelson, 1806

Lane's professional advancement was hindered by his inability to represent himself in public forum, but he did develop friendships within his own professional circle. Lane and John Constable had both been protégées of Farington in 1800 when Constable first came to London, and remained close friends until Constable died in 1837. (Note: Constable moved into Farington’s house in Charlotte Street after he died, as did Lane into Thomas Lawrence’s studios in Greek Street, as if the lingering presence of their former mentors could continue to inspire them after death) Constable had taught himself how to use sign language "so that they conversed as fluently as if no impediment existed". In 1817, Lane was nominated for election as an Associate for the Royal Academy and again in 1819 but failed to get elected, despite the unswerving support of his friend and early mentor, Joseph Farington. Competition for election was fierce and Lane was considered to be too close in style to Lawrence, so the honour went instead to his good friend Constable. Farington's efforts to support his election resulted in an increase in the number of portraits that Lane exhibited at the Royal Academy from three to four a year to seven or eight, raising his profile. Lawrence was appointed president of the Royal Academy when he returned to England in 1820. Farington, who was very influential in the Academy and sat on the selection committee for nominees, lobbied vigorously in support of Lane's election with other full academicians, but died in 1821 and with him, Lane's hopes of election as an associate. (Note: Lane continued to lobby for election at the Royal Academy, petitioning for both Lawrence's and Constable's support during their lifetimes, but ultimately was unsuccessful.)

Lane set about focusing on his own work, acquiring a "matter-of-fact truthfulness of his likenesses" in an effort to emerge from Lawrence's shadow whilst still intermittently working for him. Negotiating commissions, fixing client issues, having lodgers to bring in income, being deaf meant that simple domestic issues could become problematic, which Lane would attempt to escape from with a bottle or two of wine. (Note: Constable writes about a lonely existence for Lane) For the most part, Lane had Constable to help him out with his difficulties but not always. In 1829, Lane married Eliza Lillistone (1802–1831), daughter of a prominent merchant based in Beccles, from where he petitioned Lawrence for more work. Lawrence had agreed to Lane's proposal but died the following year in 1830, when his studios were auctioned off. Lane appears to have remained at 60 Greek Street finishing off some of Lawrence's work, producing in the process some of his own best work, despite the fact that his mother died in 1832, followed by his wife two months later.

Lane continued to work out of Greek Street for the next twenty years, even though he exhibited six or seven portraits a year each with commission values of fifty to a hundred guineas each, Lane, like Lawrence before him, was "scarcely ever been able to make both ends meet". He continued to rely on Constable's largesse, who benefitted from independent income, but with repeated failures to secure election to the Royal Academy. Lane continued to paint after Constable died in 1837, but fewer of his portraits were exhibited at the Academy. Eventually, he left Greek Street in 1853 for the cleaner air of Ipswich, over twenty years after Lawrence had died. Lane sent his last contribution to an exhibition at the Royal Academy in 1857.

== Family life ==
Lane had a reputation for having a short-temper, sometimes reacting with irritation or visible frustration when he felt misunderstood or excluded from normal conversation. His capacity to socialise outside of his immediate circle of friends and supporters is not well known but he met and married Eliza Lillistone in 1829, the daughter of a Suffolk merchant and modest landowner Samuel Lillistone, whose portrait he had painted. Eliza died two years later giving birth to a son where they were living at Greek Street. A widower for four years, Lane married secondly Catherine Powys, daughter of the Reverend Thomas Powys (1768-1817), having three children with her before she too died in 1839. The following year he married his third wife, Elizabeth Murray, having previously and subsequently painted and exhibited portraits of several members of her family. Lane's small family remained at Greek Street until 1853, when they relocated to Ipswich for his health.

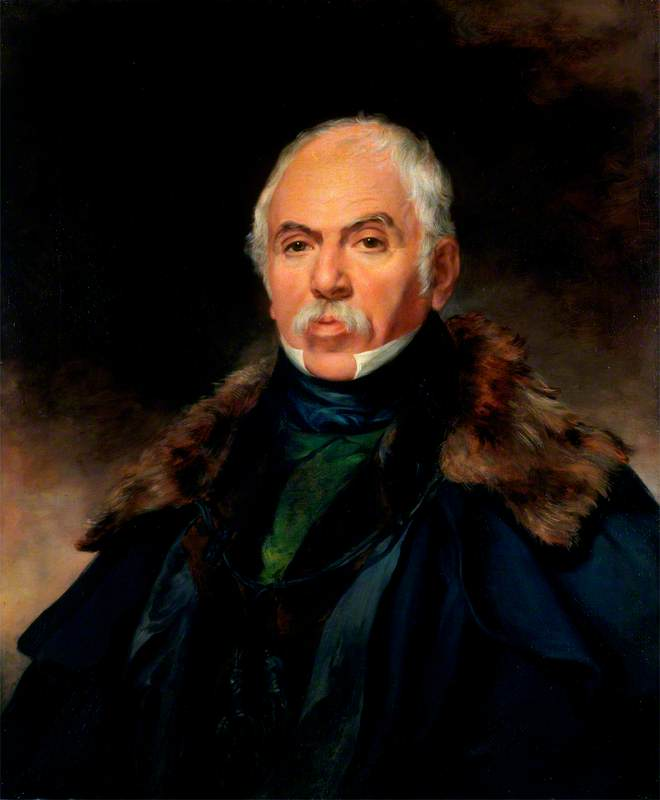
Watts's copy of Lane's Constantine Ionides, ca. 1840

== Legacy ==
Samuel Lane died at [Lower] Brook Street, Ipswich on 29 July 1859, leaving a widow Elizabeth and four children with effects in his will valued at under two hundred pounds. As a deaf artist living and surviving at the turn of the 18th and 19th centuries, earning a living in any practical sense had always been a struggle. He was criticised for being a copyist in his life, but he also left a substantial body of work, (Note: 217 exhibited at the Royal Academy but probably more that were never exhibited, either because he wasn't satisfied with the outcome or because the commission owner was not prepared to release the portrait for exhibition) including portraits of Lord George Bentinck for the King's Lynn Guildhall; James Saumarez, 1st Baron de Saumarez for the United Service Club; Sir George Pollock and Sir John Malcolm for the Oriental Club; Charles Gordon-Lennox, 5th Duke of Richmond; Charles Blomfield, bishop of London; Thomas Clarkson for Wisbech Town Hall; Philip Broke for the East Suffolk Hospital; Thomas Coke, for the Norwich Corn Exchange; Luke Hansard for the Stationers' Company; Thomas Telford, Edmond Wodehouse, General William Loftus (MP), Lady Elizabeth Loftus, George Manby and other prominent persons. Lane was known for truthful likenesses; many of them were engraved by Charles Turner, Samuel William Reynolds, William Ward, and others. After he had died, later artists copied his work.

== Gallery ==
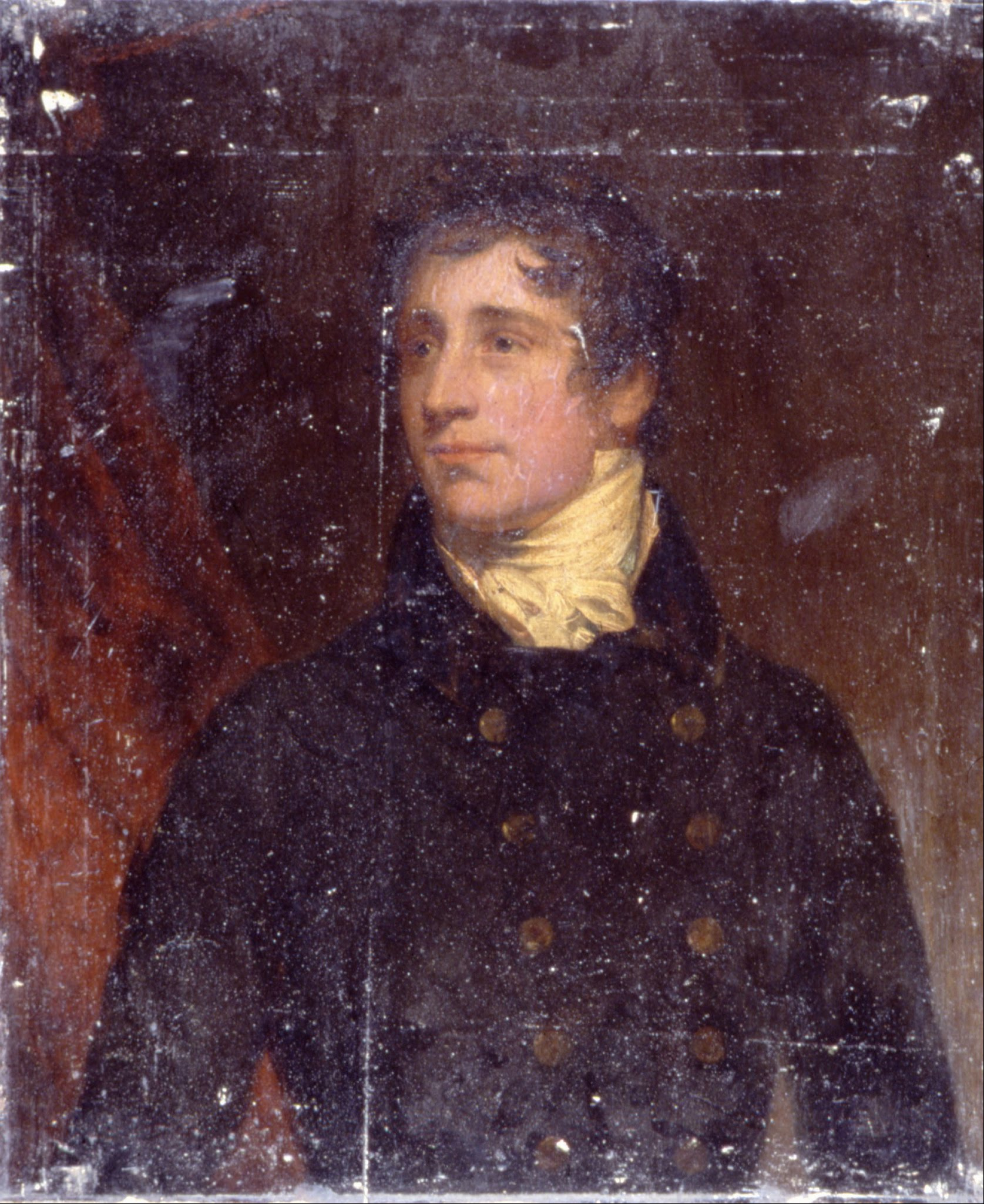
Artist's younger brother Frederick Lane, circa 1806

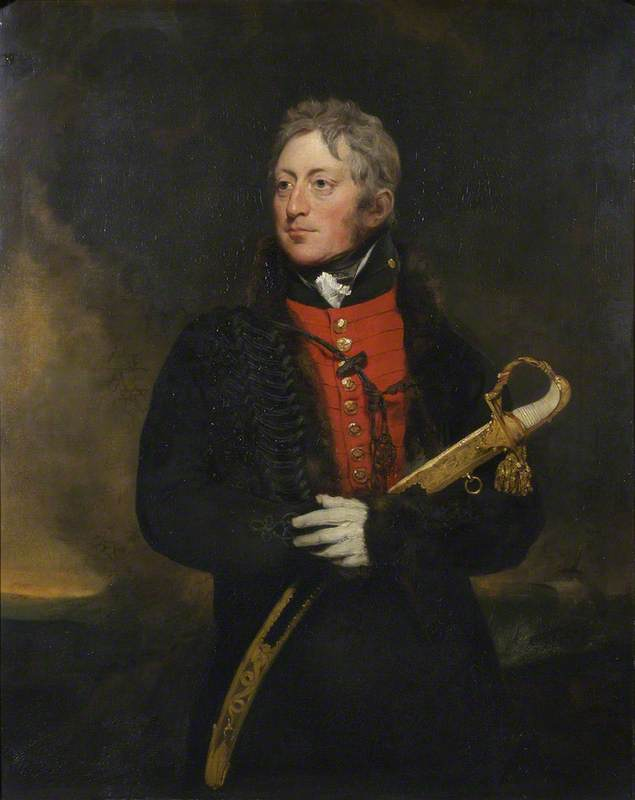
George Manby, 1813

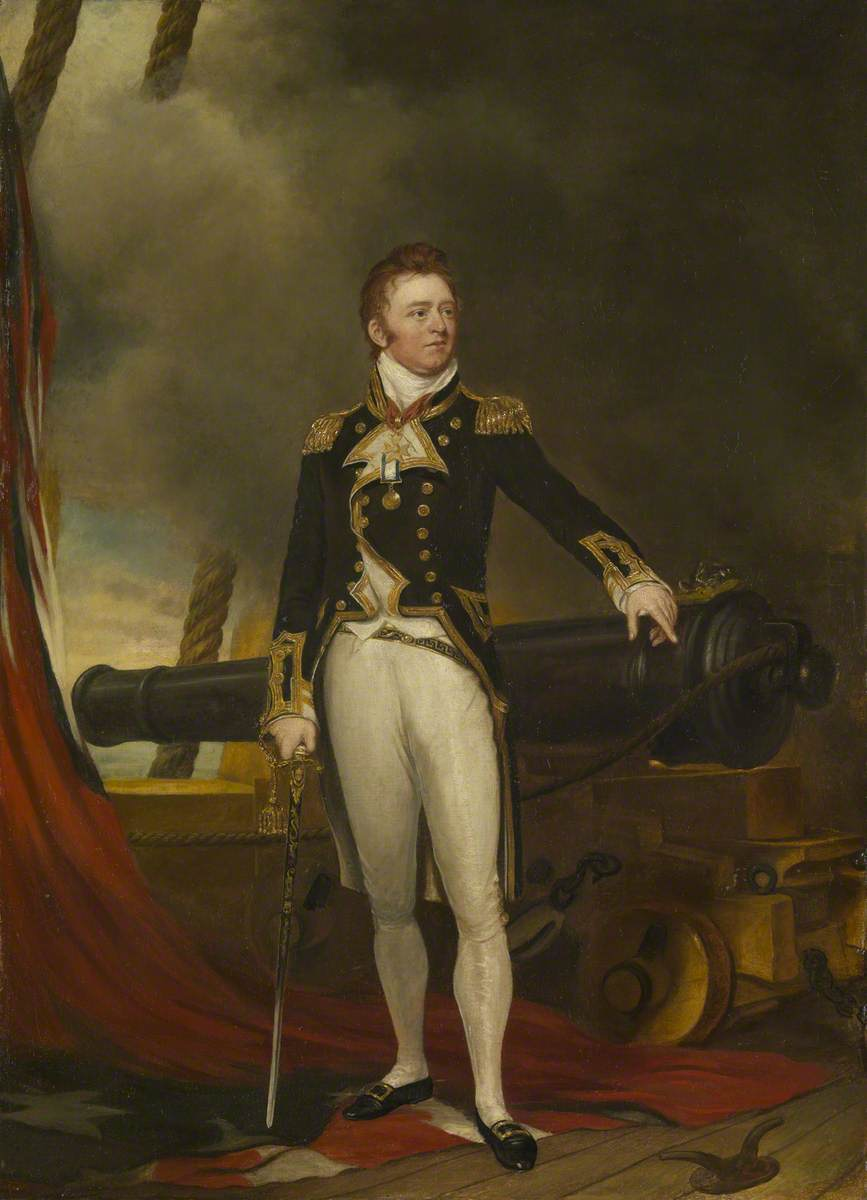
Sir Philip Broke, 1814

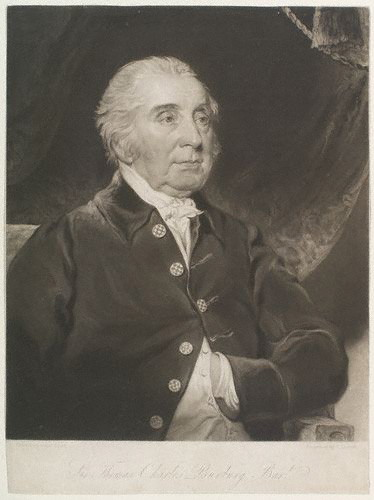
Sir Charles Bunbury, 1819

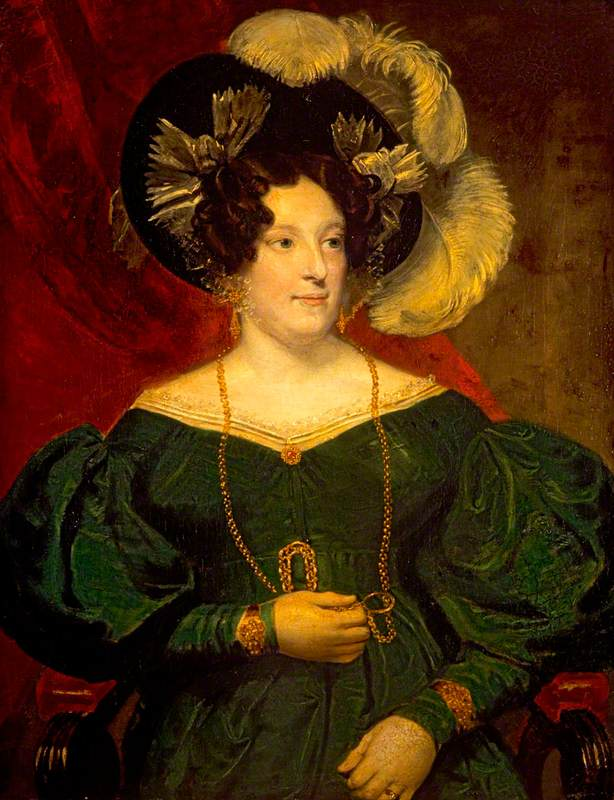
Caroline of Brunswick, 1820

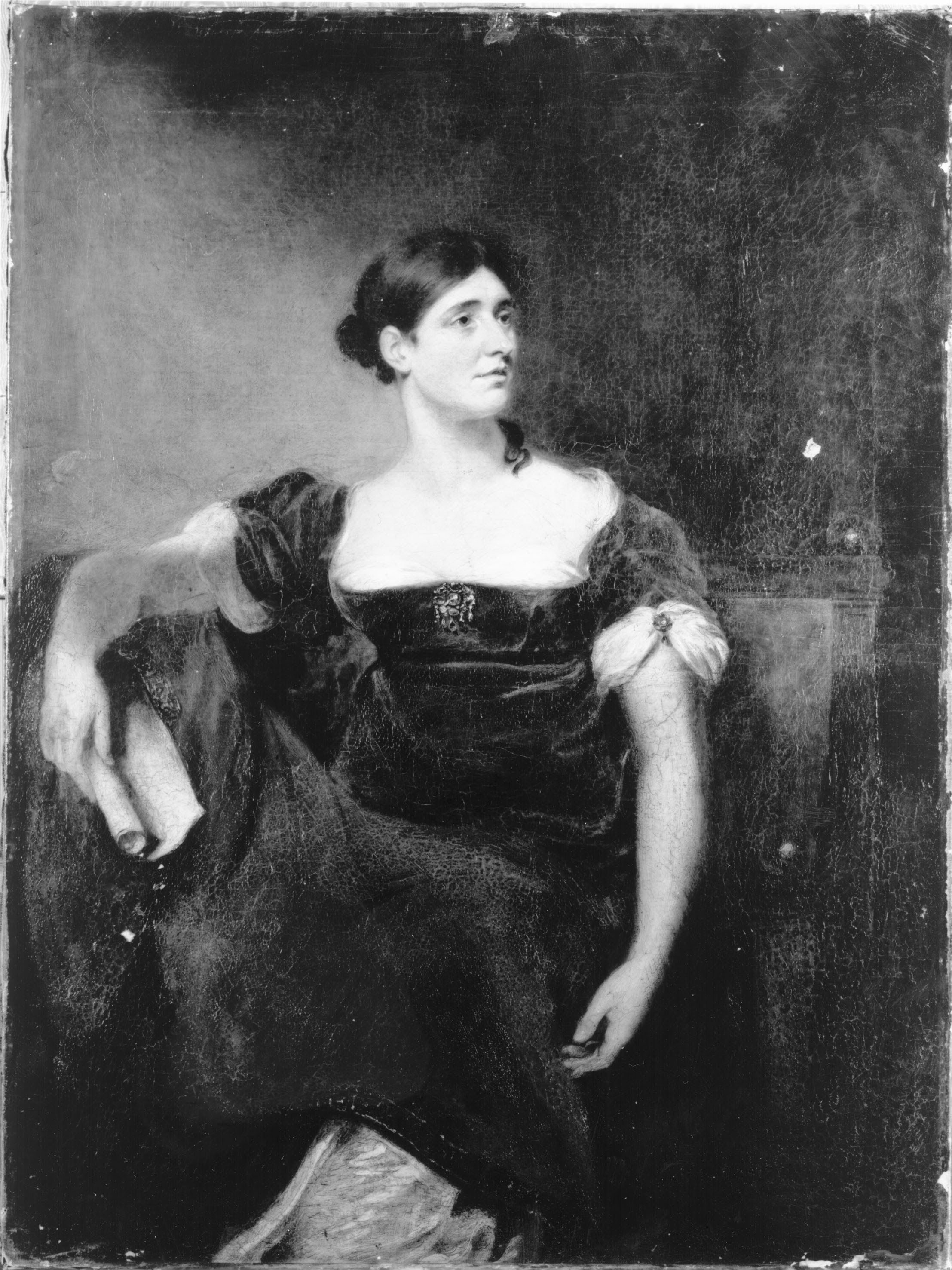
Sarah Bartley, 1820

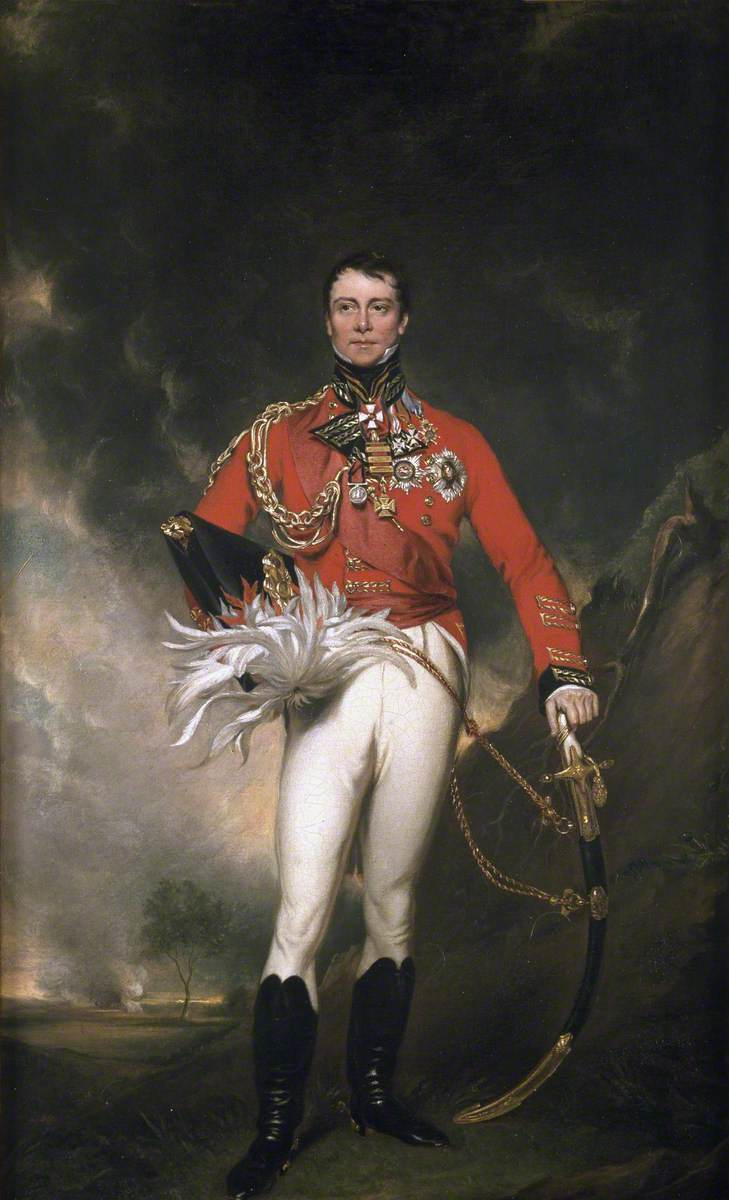
James Kempt, 1820

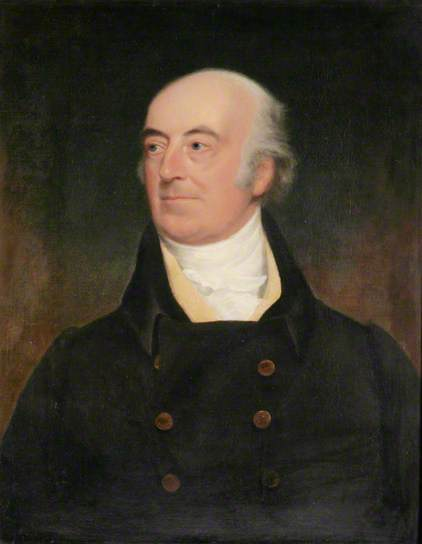
Thomas William Coke Esq., exhibited 1835

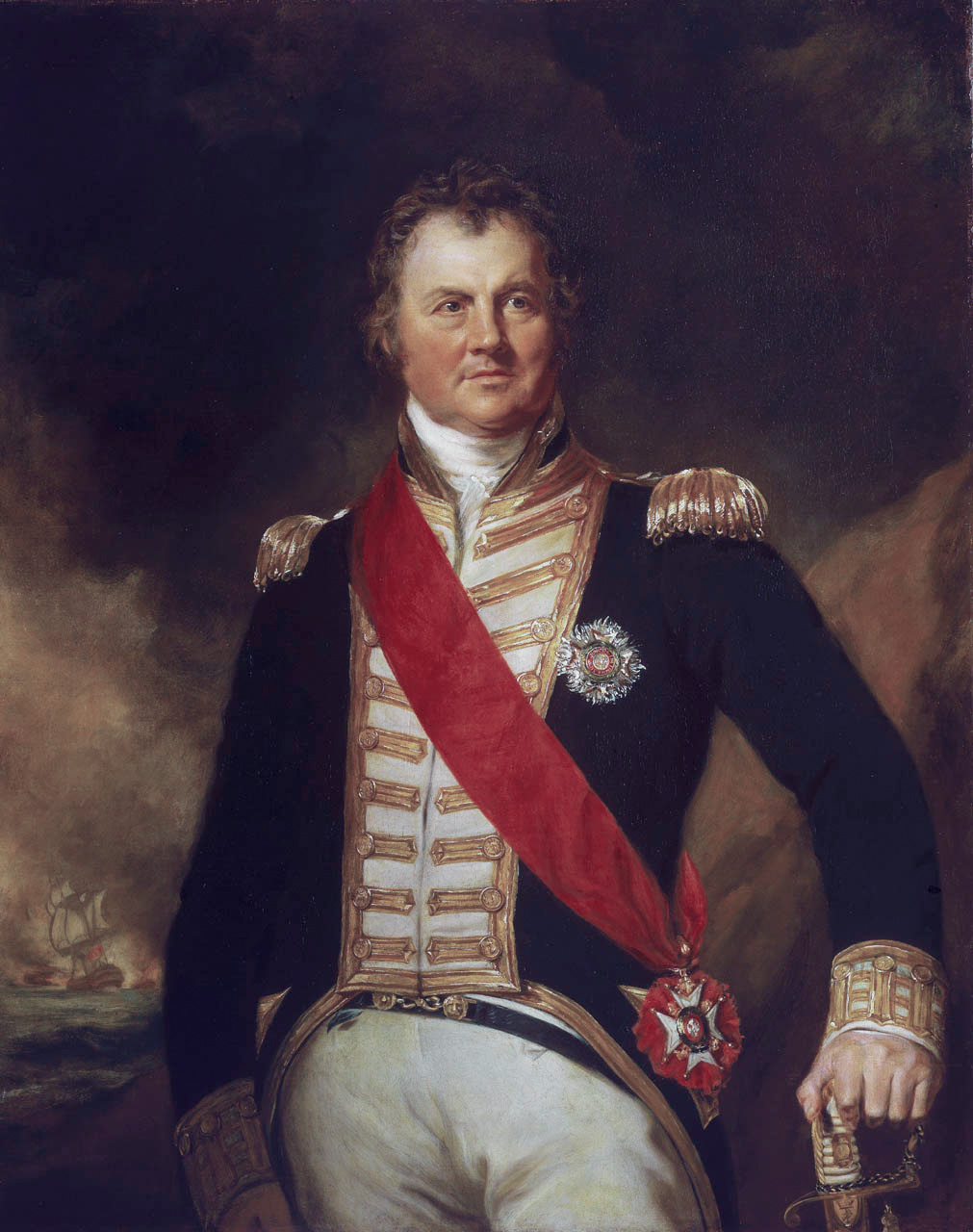
Admiral Edward Thornborough, 1821

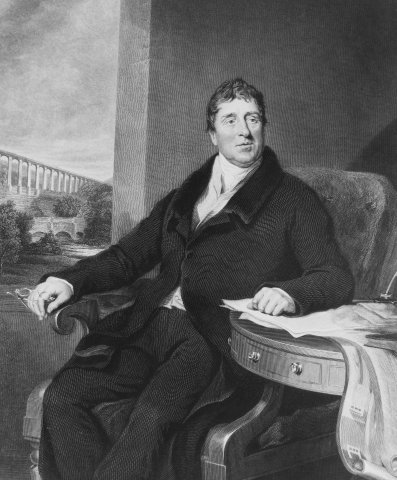
Thomas Telford, 1822

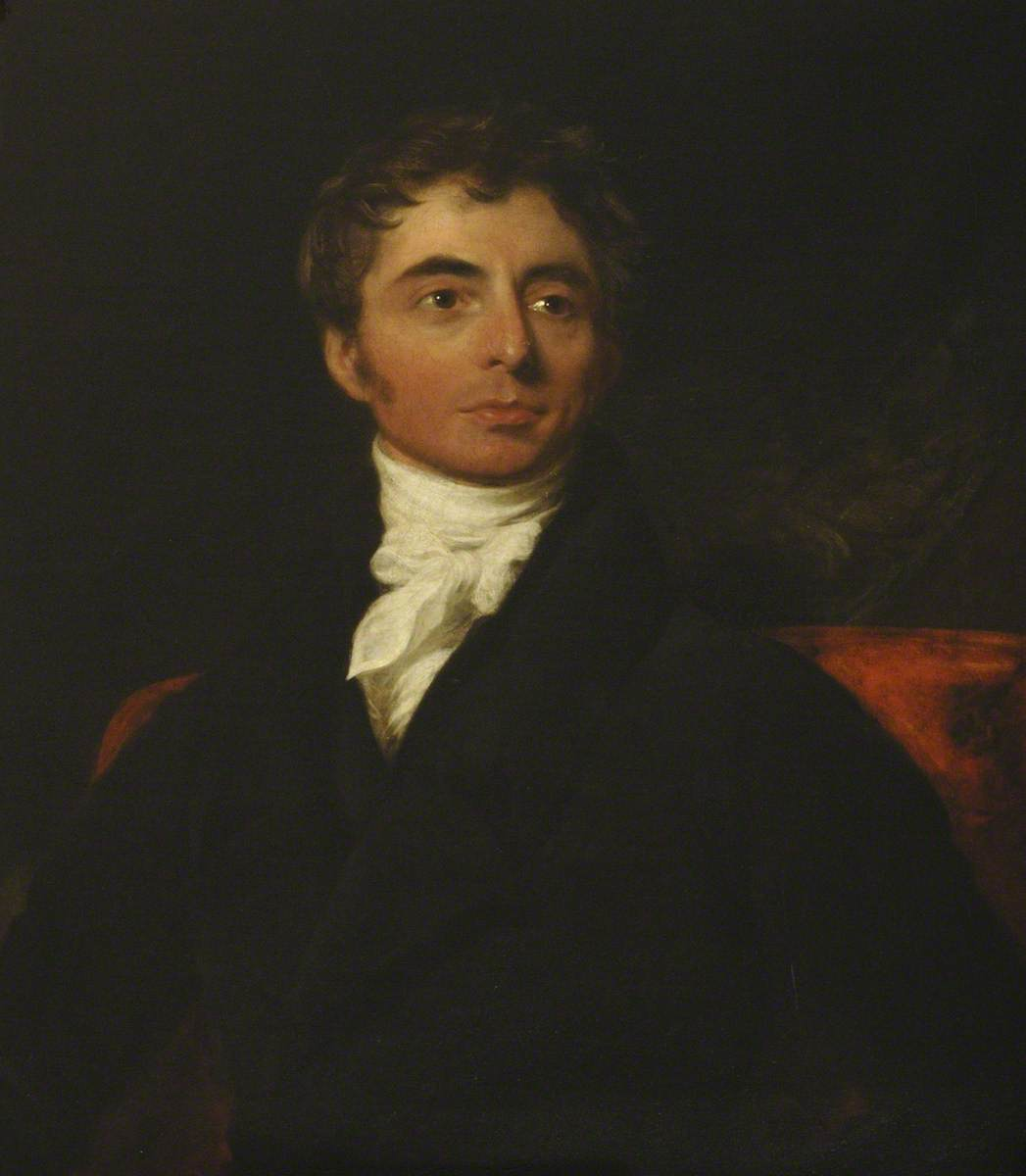
Robert Southey, 1824

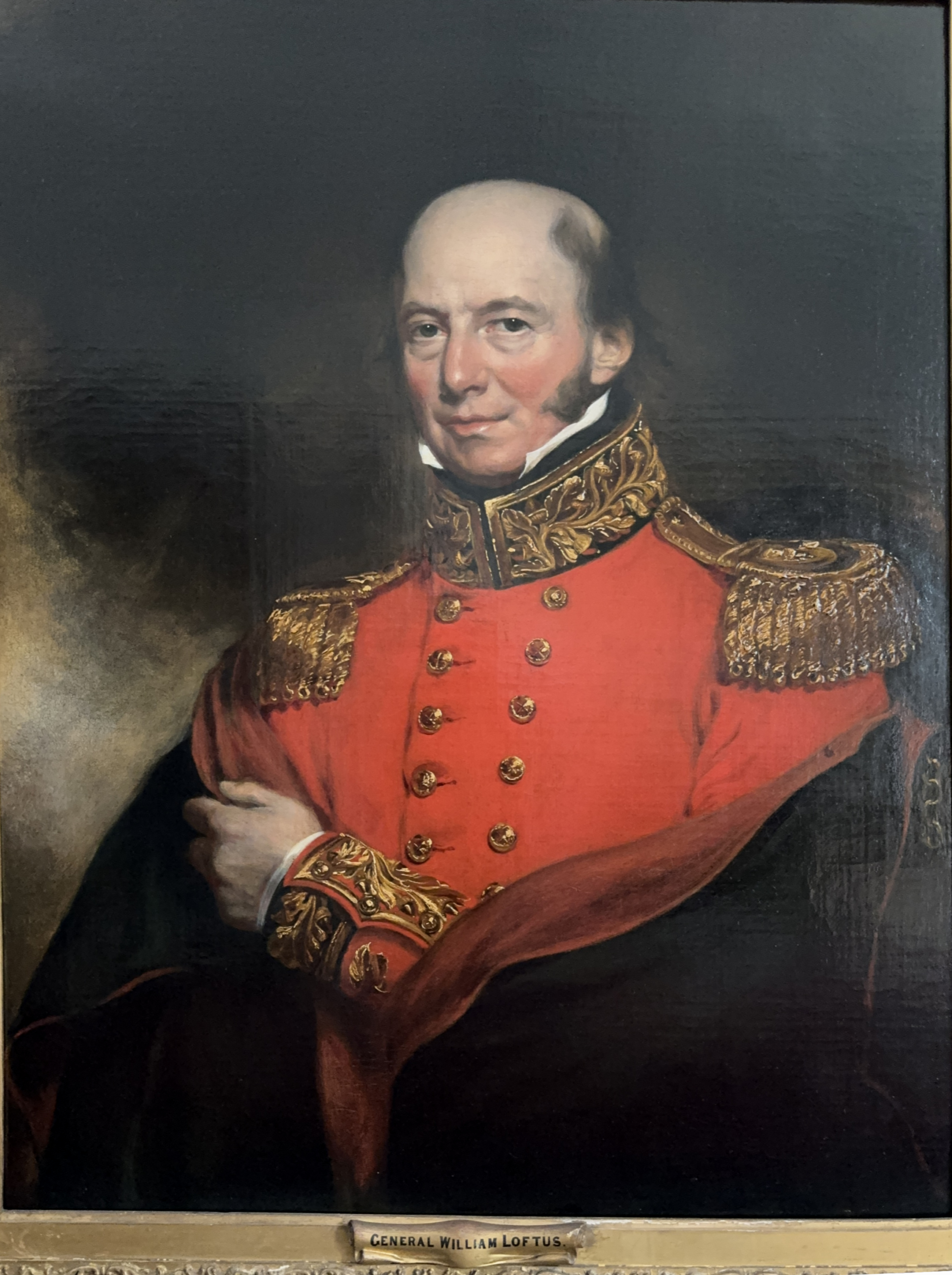
General William Loftus, ca. 1825

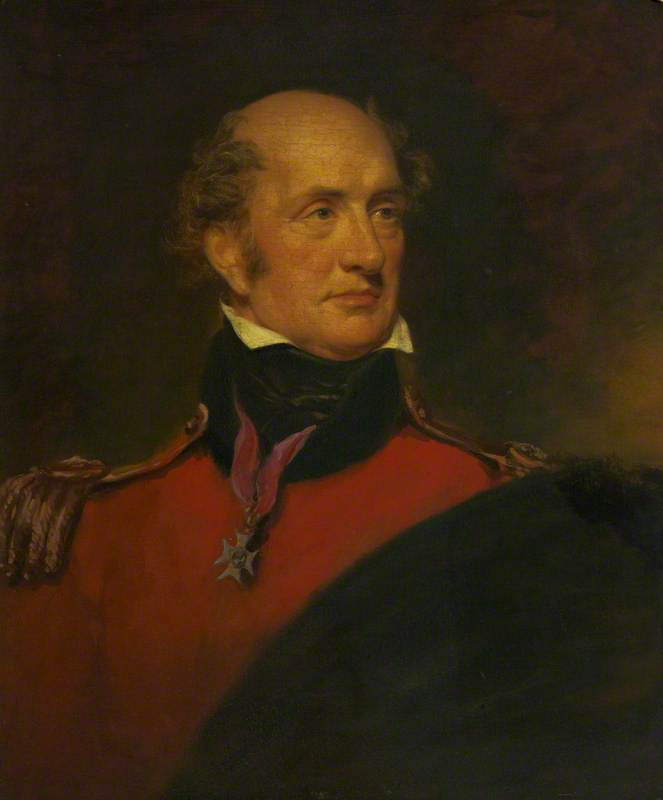
Sir John Malcolm, 1826

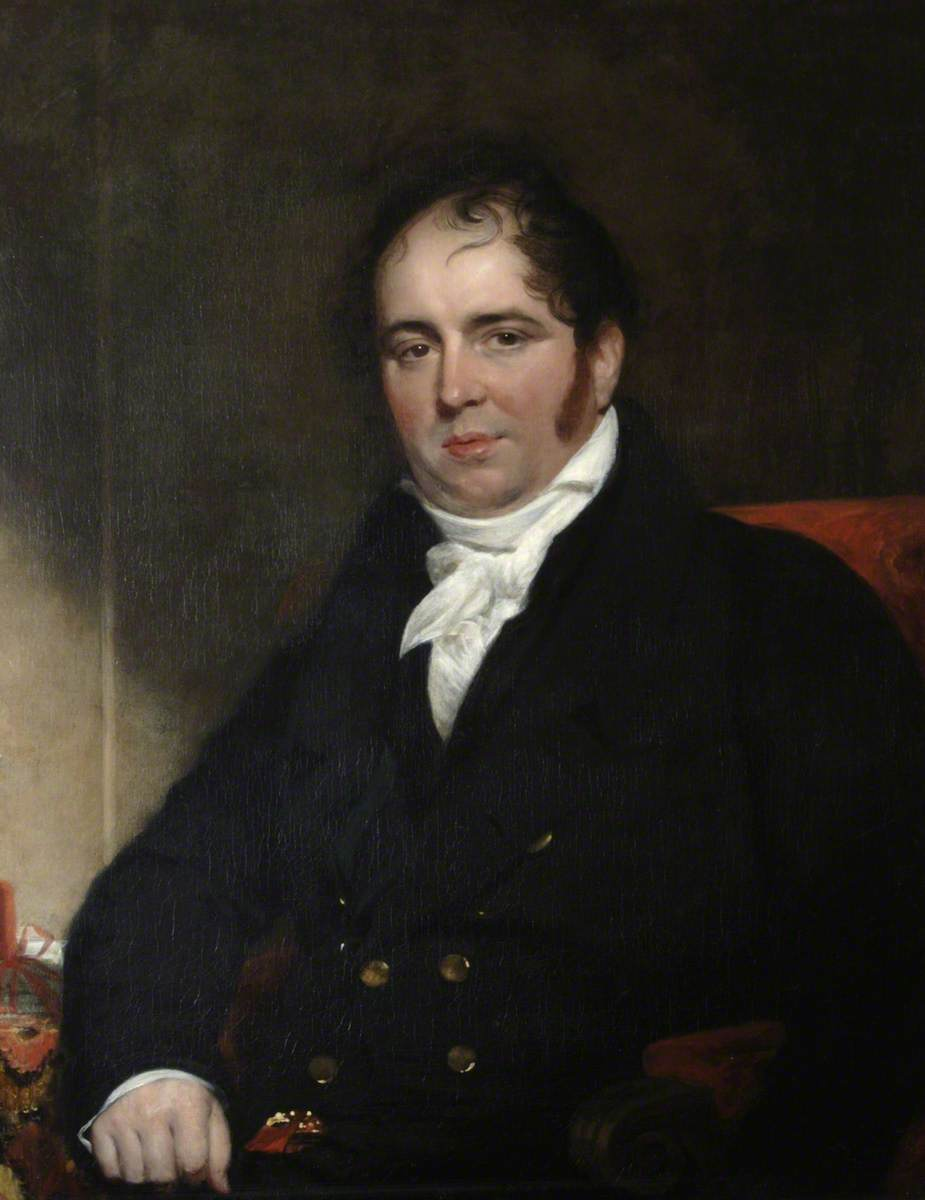
Luke Graves Hansard, 1826

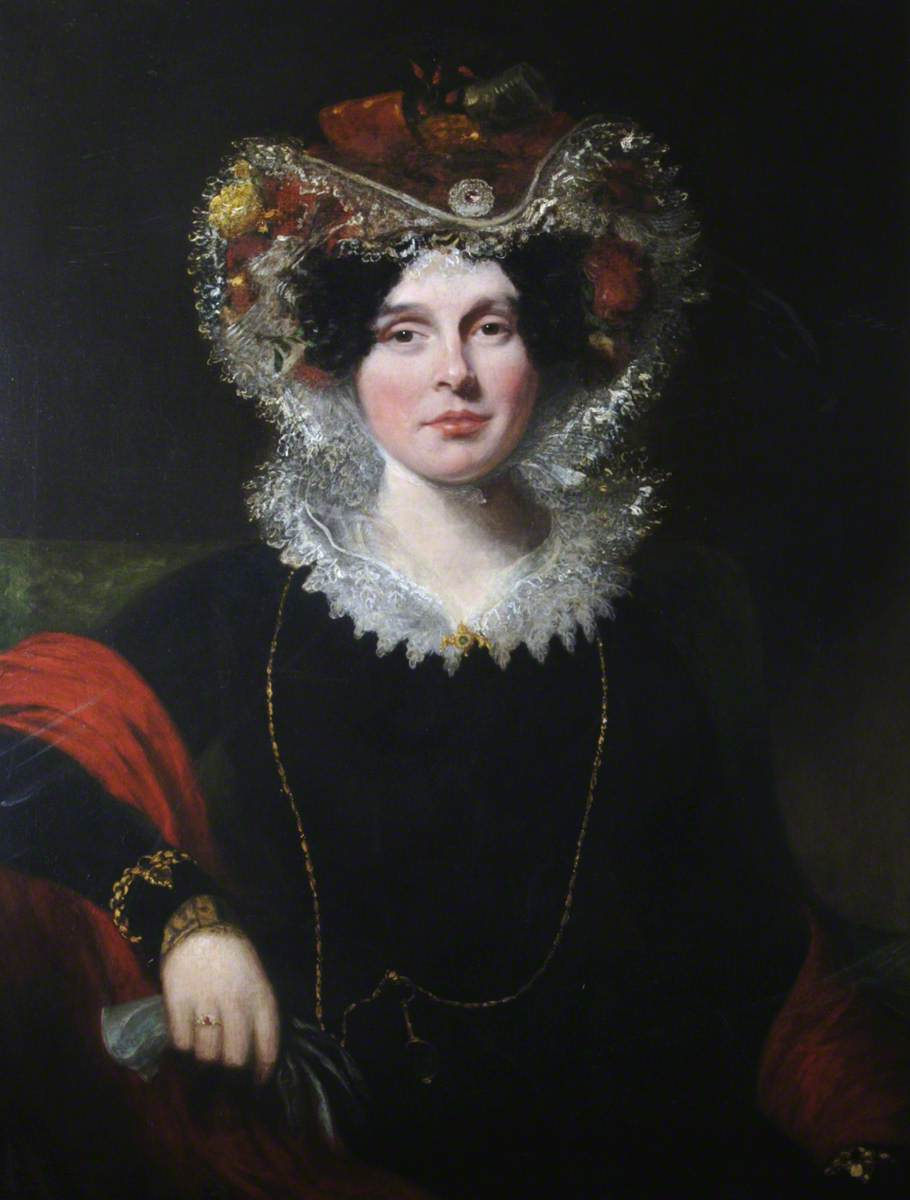
Elizabeth Hansard (née Hobbes) (not exhibited)

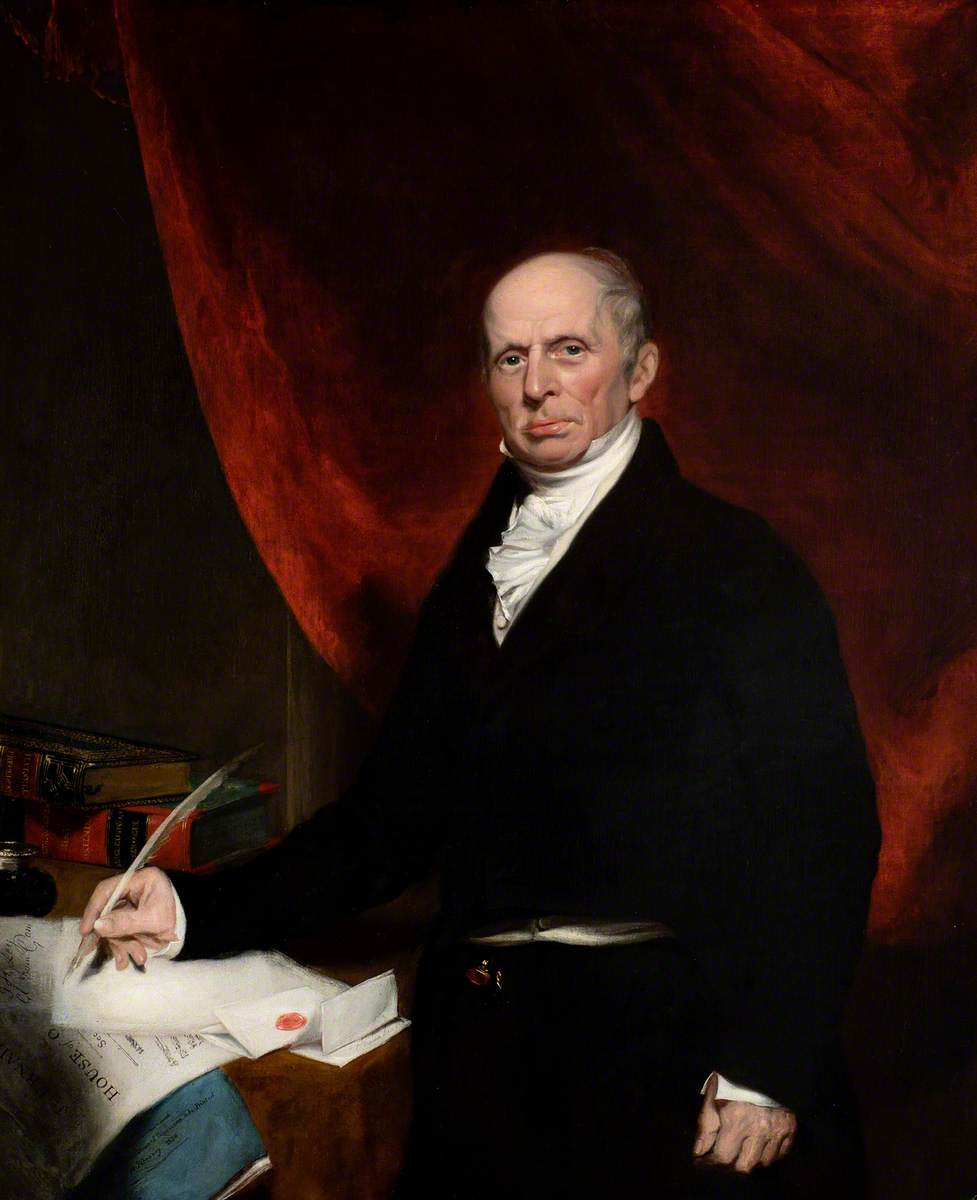
Luke Hansard, 1827 (not exhibited)

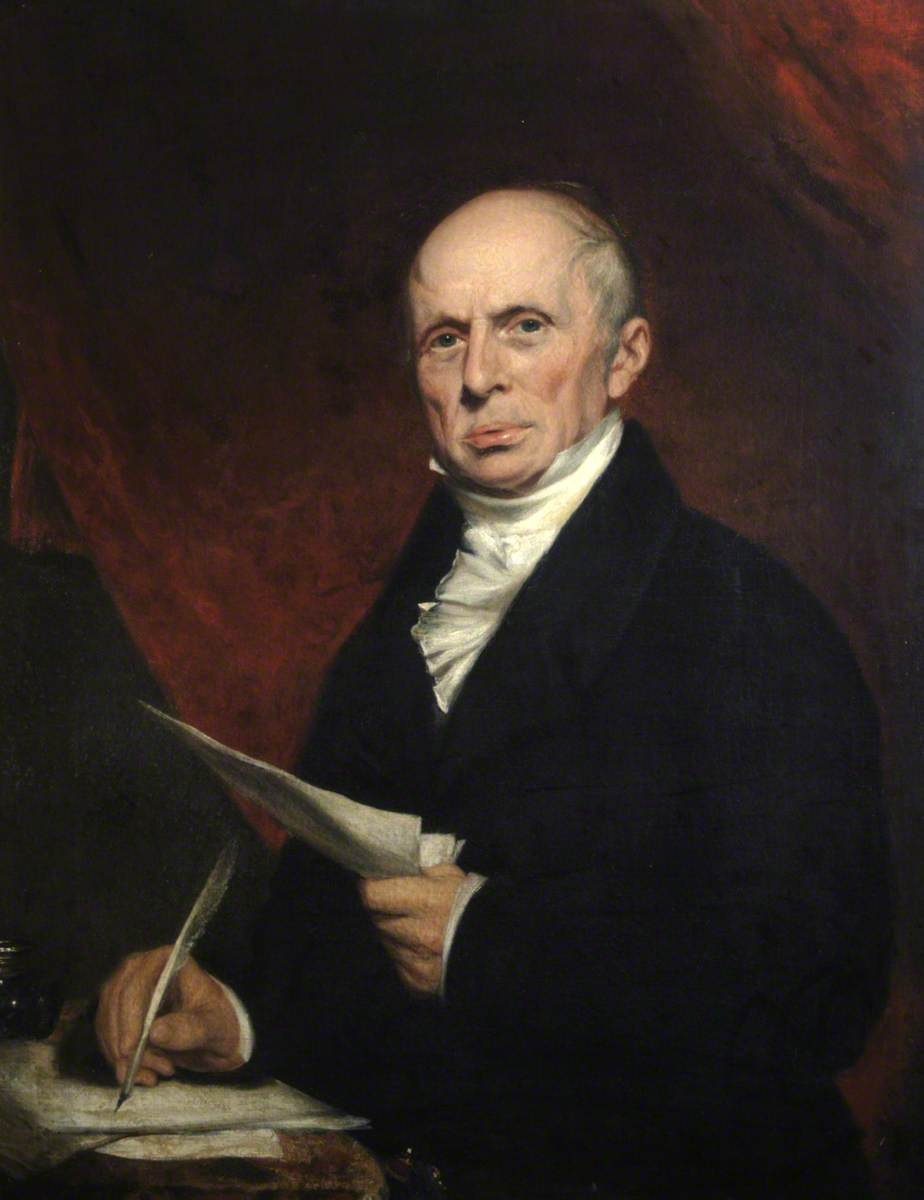
Luke Hansard, 1828 (not exhibited)

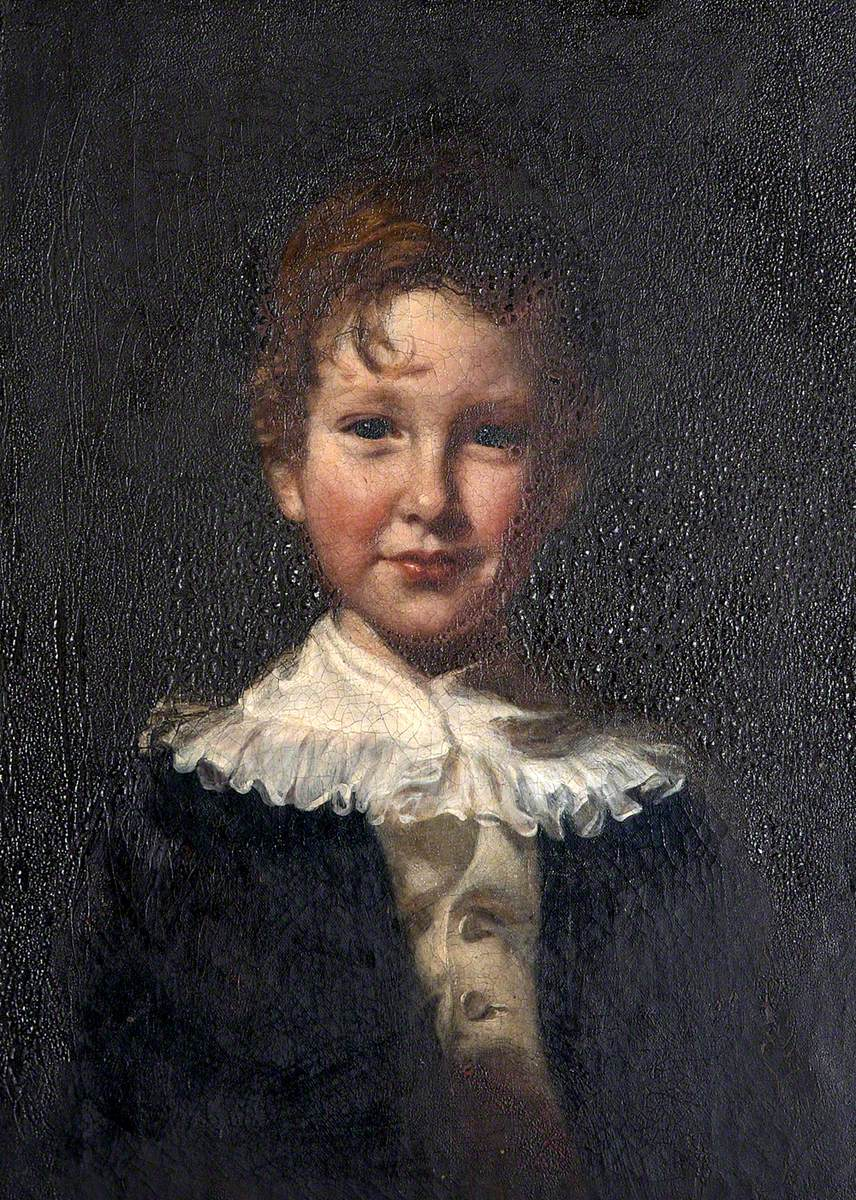
Richard James Hansard, circa 1826 to 1828

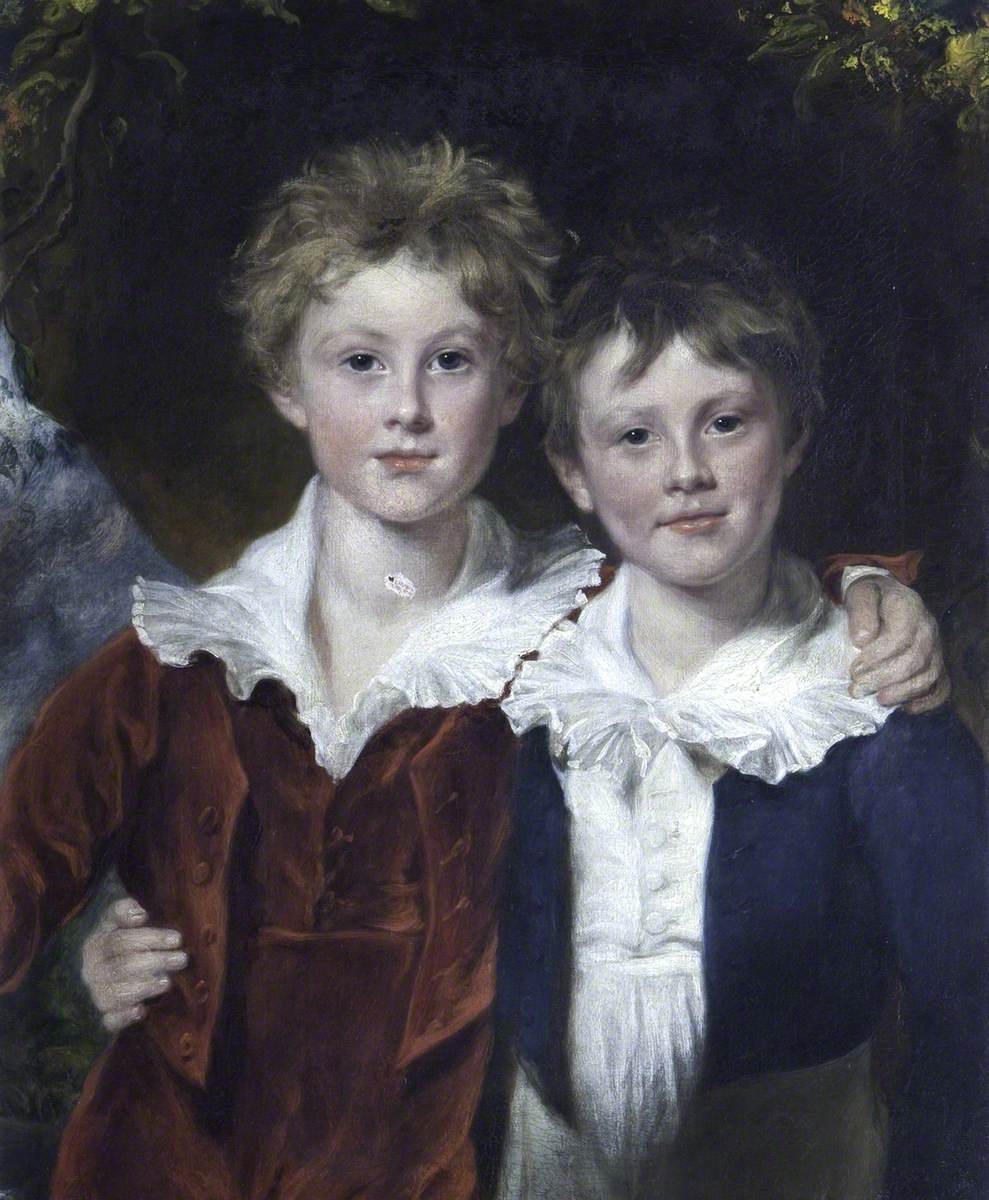
Brothers Thomas and Edward Coke, 1830

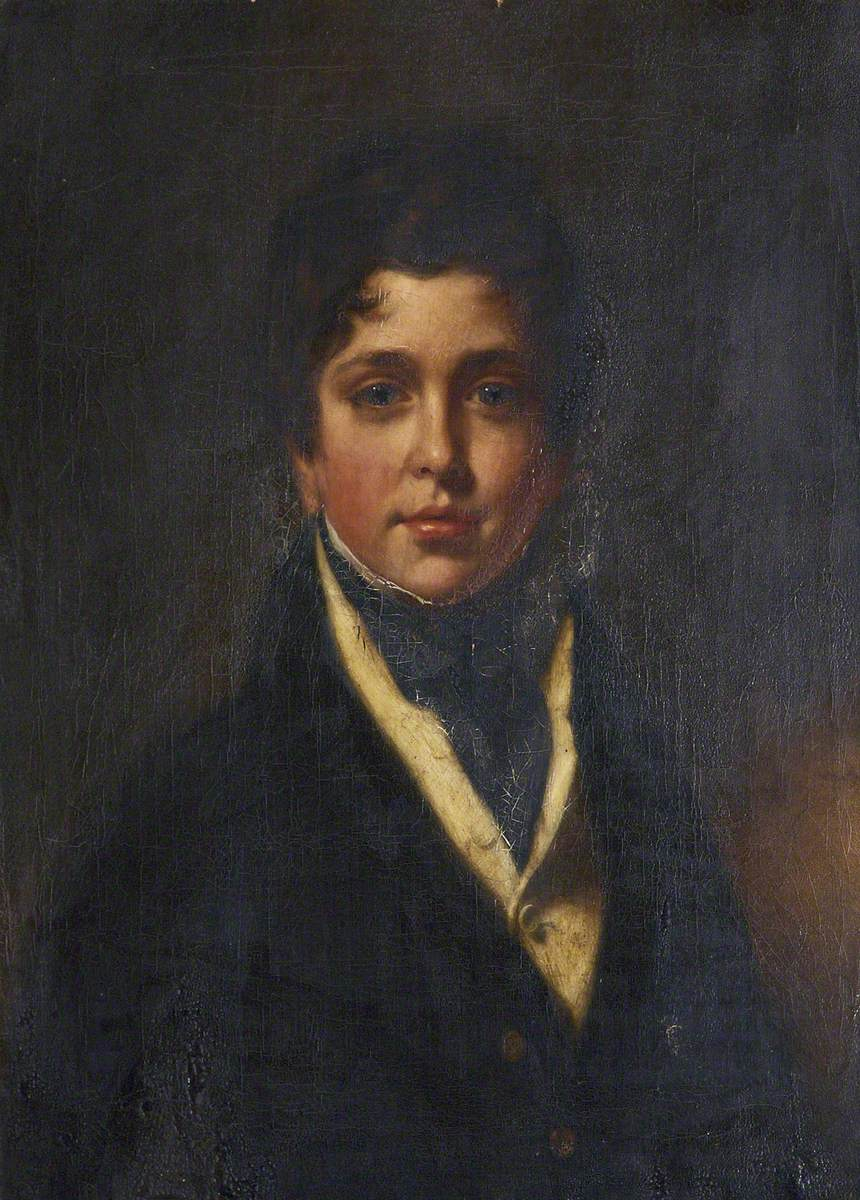
Alfred Ogle Hansard, ca. 1830

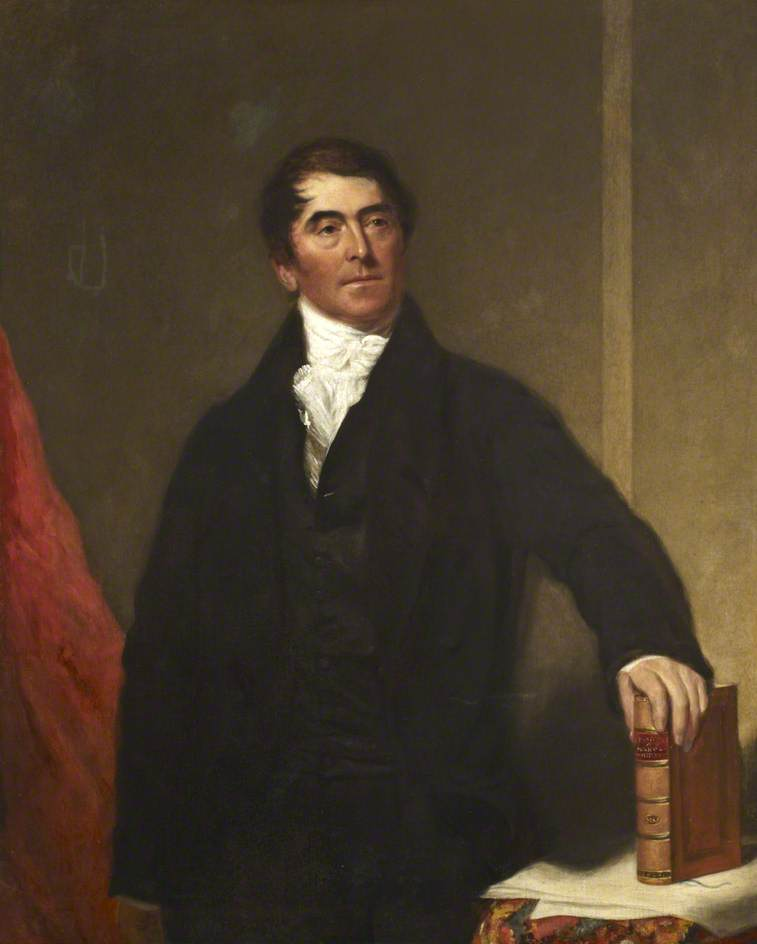
George Birkbeck, 1830 (not exhibited)

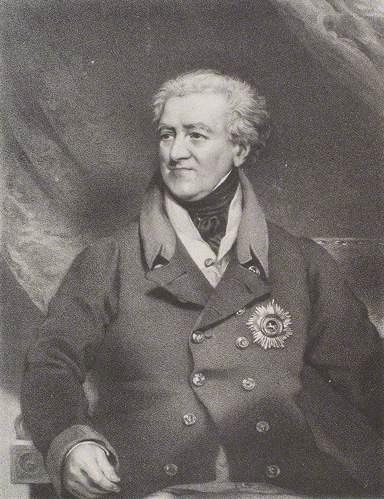
Sir Samuel Hulse, 1830

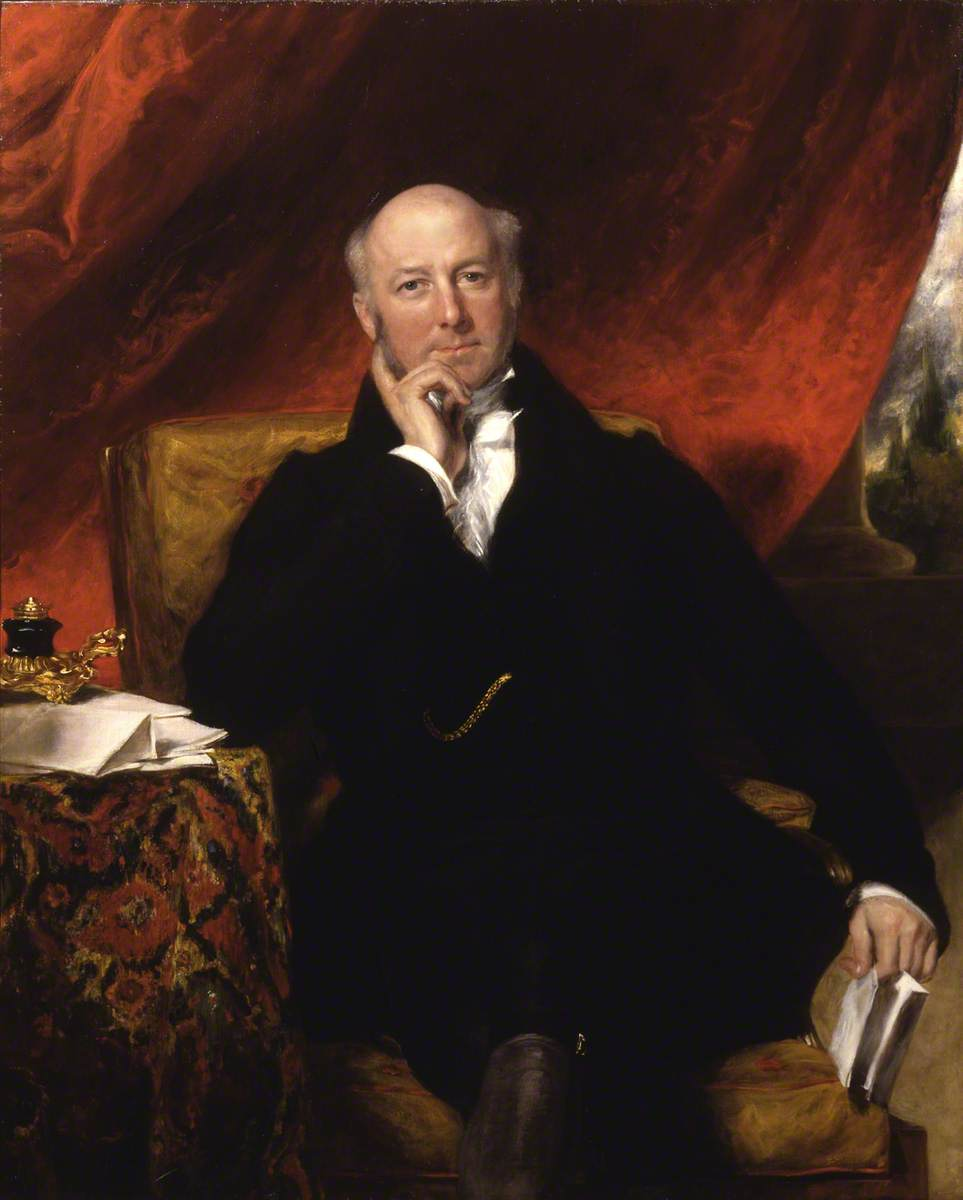
Sir Charles Mansfield Clarke, 1832

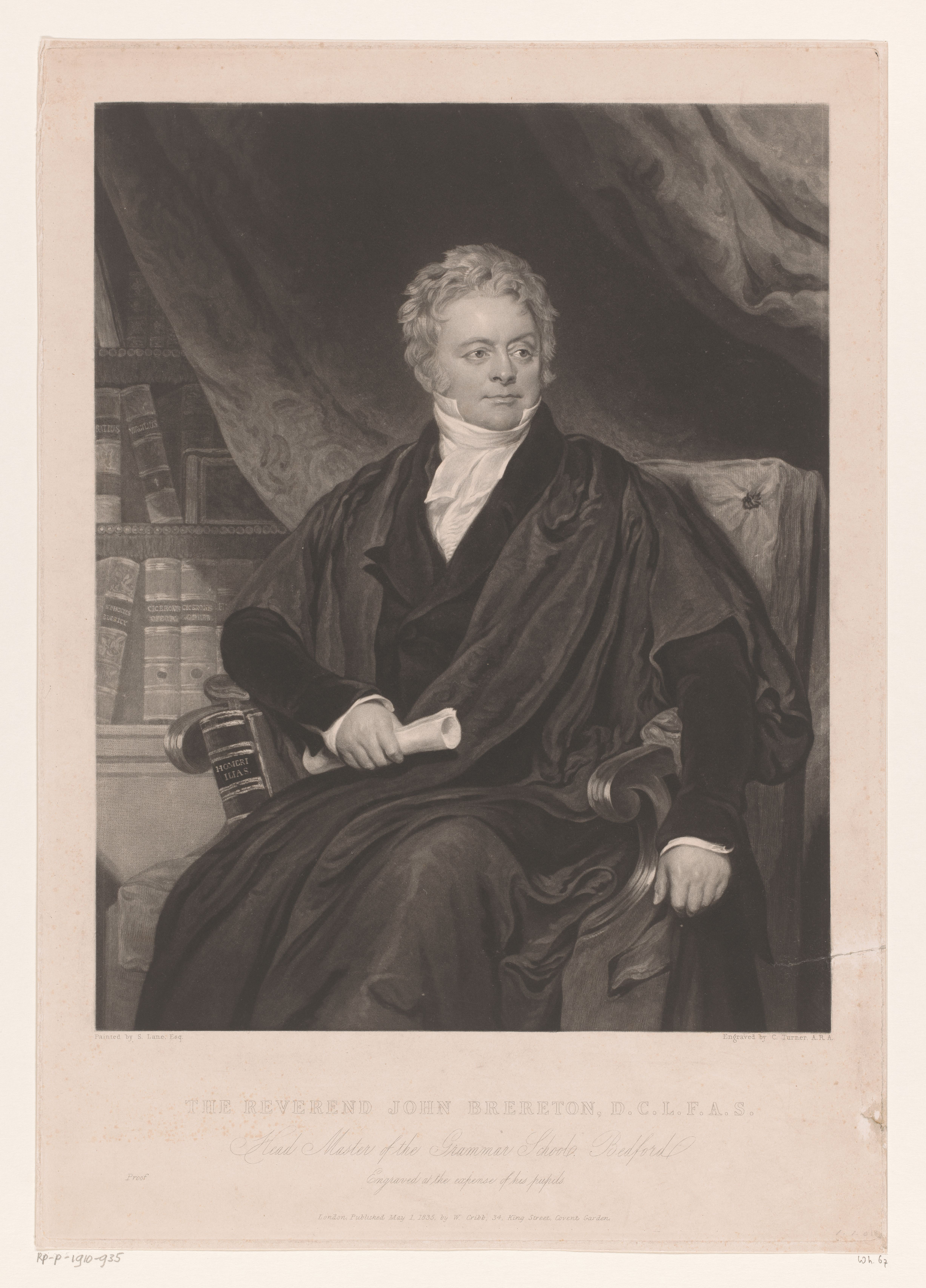
Rev John Brereton, 1833

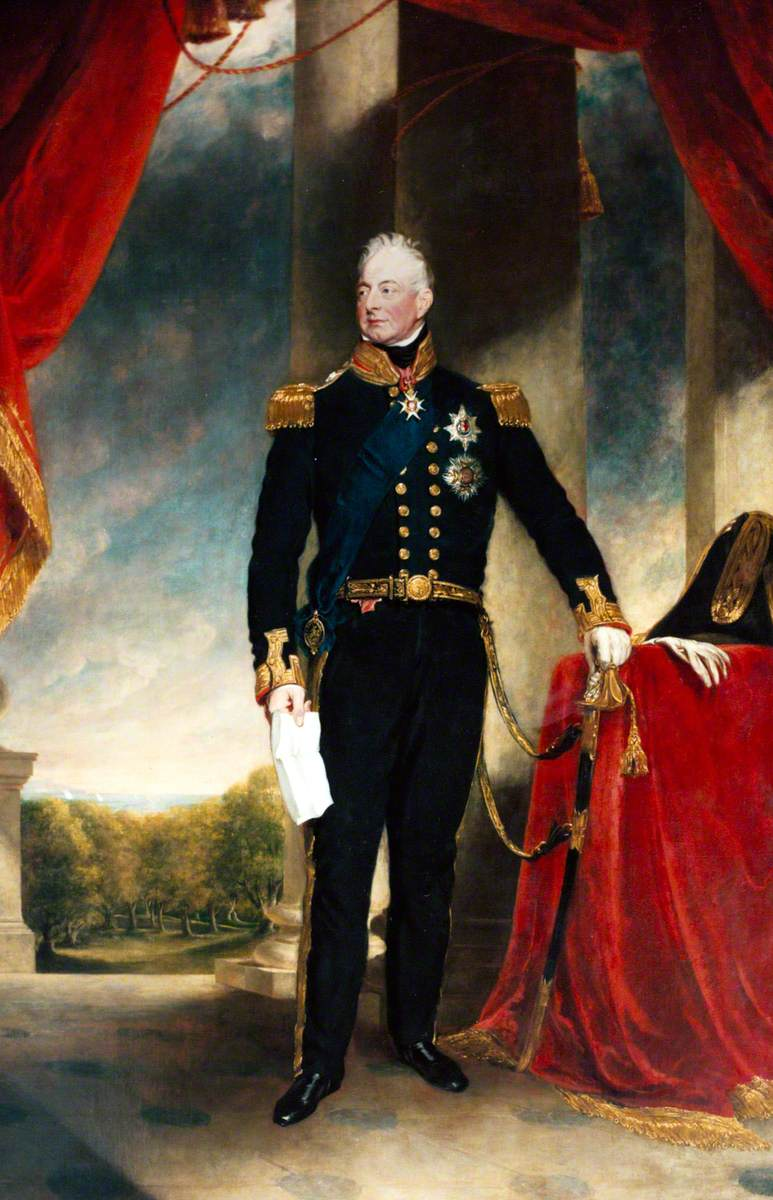
William IV, 1832-1834 (not exhibited)

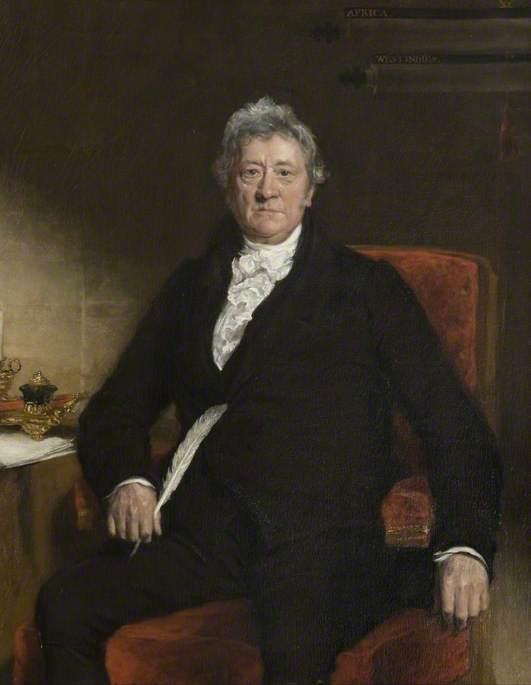
Thomas Clarkson, 1834

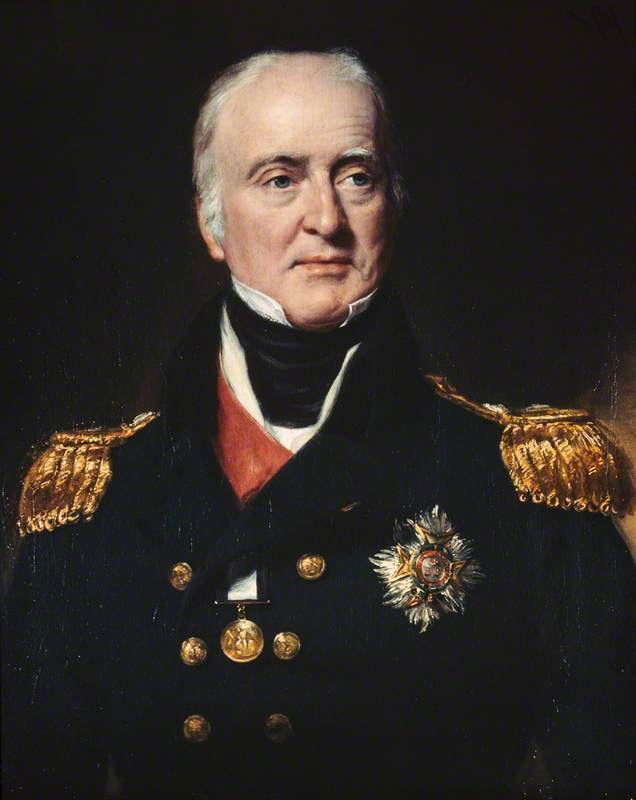
Admiral Sir Pulteney Malcolm, 1835

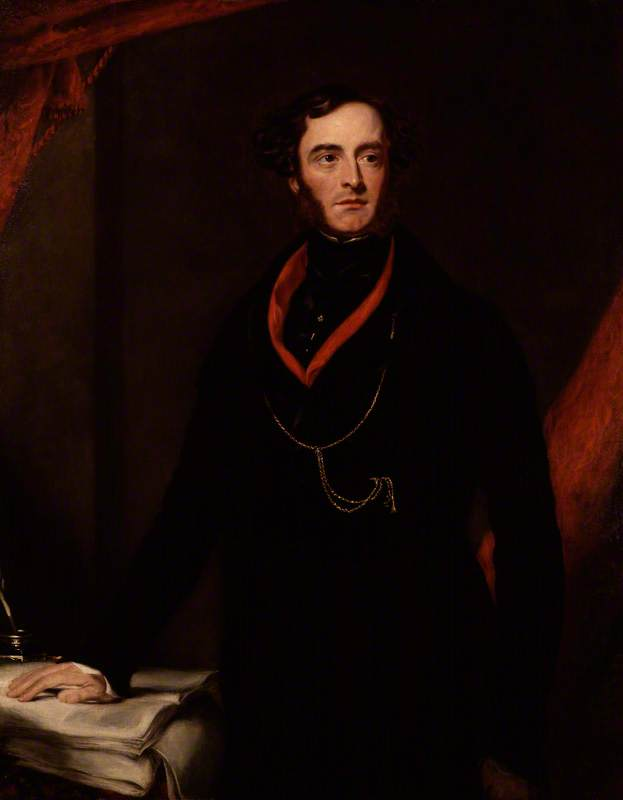
Lord George Bentinck, 1836

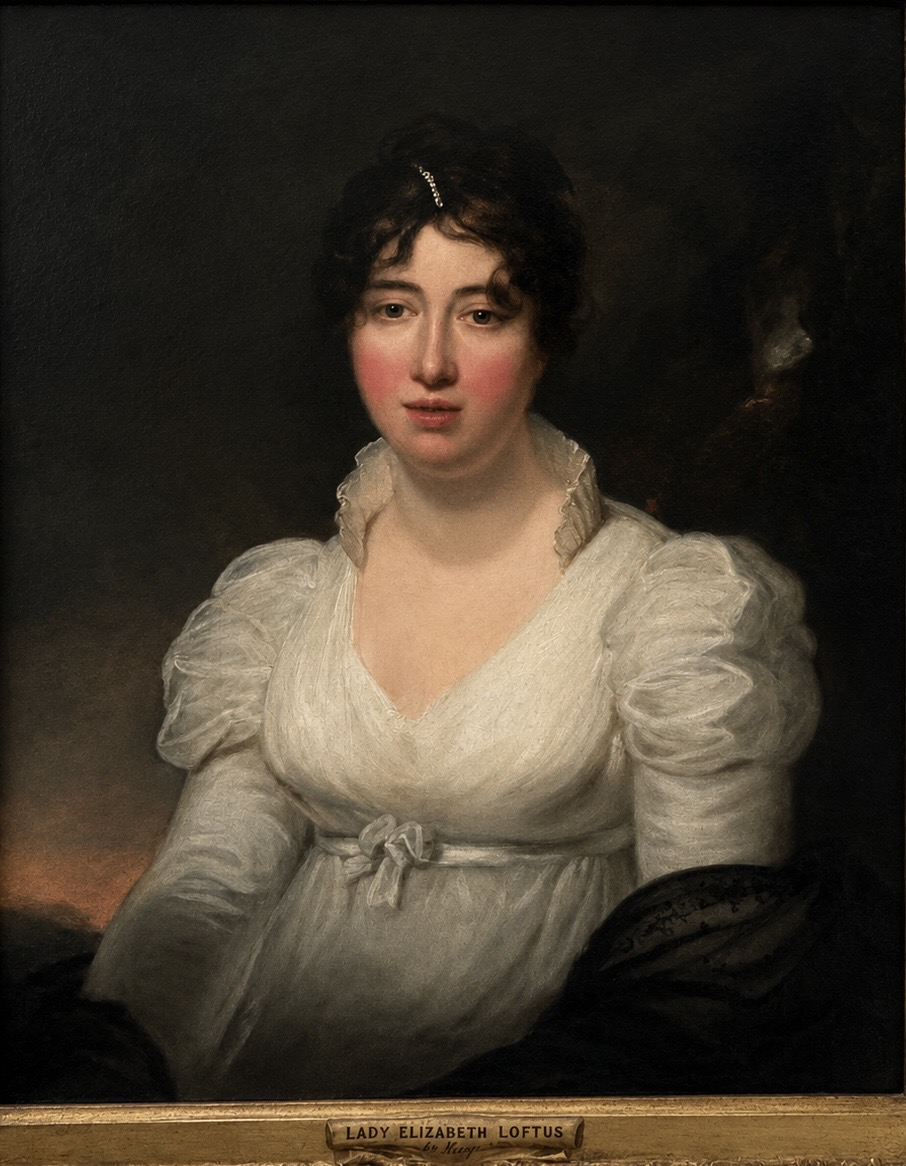
Lady Elizabeth Loftus, ca. 1837

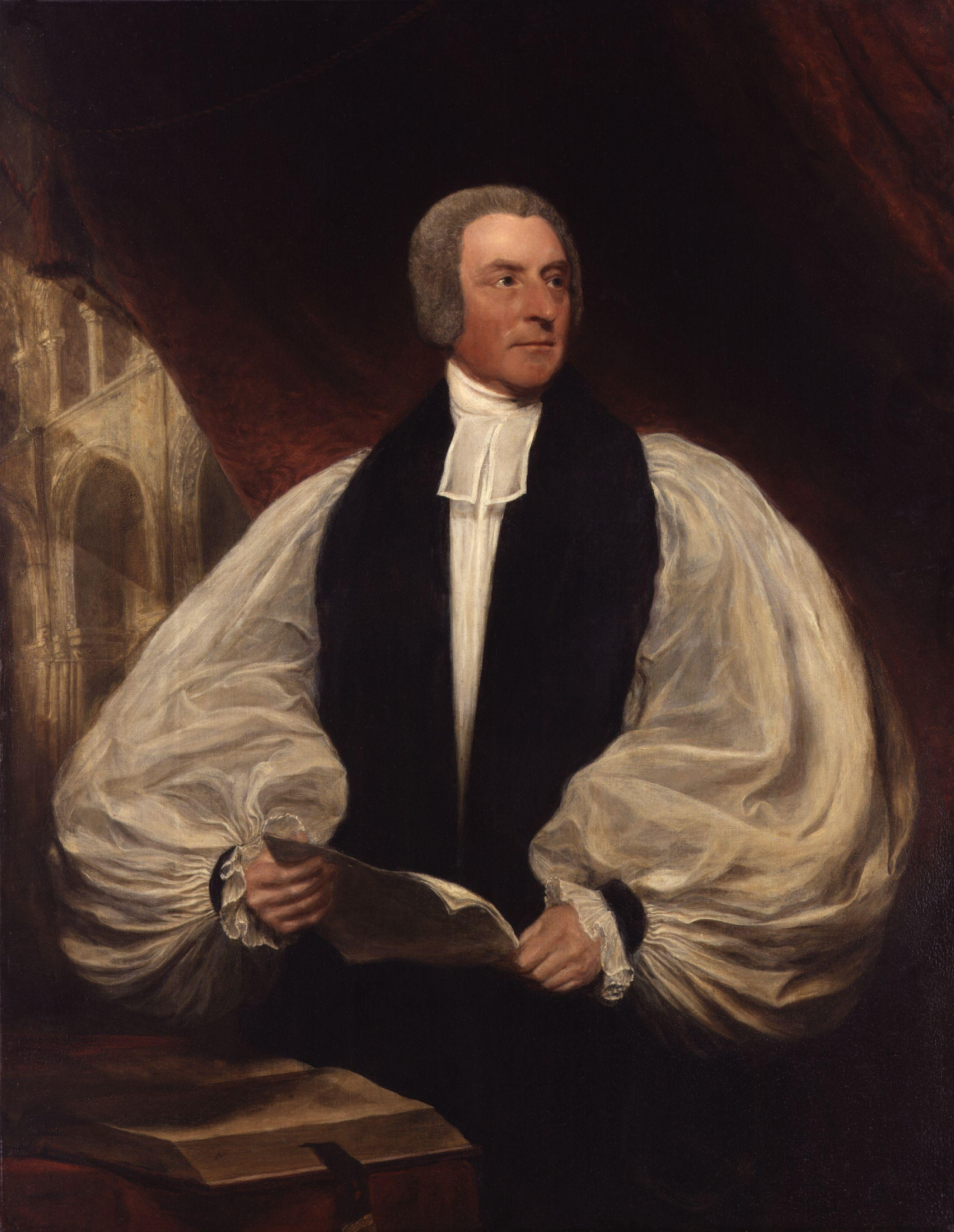
George Murray, 1849

== Notes and references ==
=== References ===
Attribution

- O'Donoghue, Freeman Marius (1892). "Lane, Samuel" . In Lee, Sidney (ed.). Dictionary of National Biography. Vol. 32. London: Smith, Elder & Co.

== Sources ==
- Farington, Joseph (1902). Greig, James (ed.). The Farington Diary. Vol. I–VIII. London: Hutchinson.
- Beckett, R.B., ed. (1966). John Constable's Correspondence - IV - Patrons, dealers and fellow artists. Suffolk Records Society Volume X.
