= Cross modal plasticity =

Type of brain development capacity

Cross modal plasticity can reorganize connections between the four main lobes as a response to sensory loss.

Cross modal plasticity is the adaptive reorganization of neurons to integrate the function of two or more sensory systems. Cross modal plasticity is a type of neuroplasticity and often occurs after sensory deprivation due to disease or brain damage. The reorganization of the neural network is greatest following long-term sensory deprivation, such as congenital blindness or pre-lingual deafness. For example, individuals with auditory deficits may experience strengthened visual processing compared to hearing individuals. In these instances, cross modal plasticity can strengthen other sensory systems to compensate for the lack of vision or hearing. This strengthening is due to new connections that are formed to brain cortices that no longer receive sensory input.

Cross modal plasticity is not only limited to auditory and visual systems but can cause reorganization in tactile and olfactory systems too.

== Plasticity after visual deficit ==
In people who are blind, the visual cortex is still in active use, although it deals with information different from visual input. Studies on individuals with visual deficits, have shown that the volume of white matter (myelinated nerve connections) was reduced in the optic tract, but not in the primary visual cortex. However, grey matter volume was reduced by up to 25% in the primary visual cortex. The atrophy of grey matter, the neuron bodies, is likely due to its association with the optic tract. When the eyes no longer receive visual information, the optic tract does not relay input to the primary visual cortex. Therefore, over time, both the optic tracts and grey matter in the primary visual cortex decrease in volume. White matter is thought to atrophy using the same principle of "use it or lose it," but the white matter in the primary visual cortex, which is made up of axons capable of undergoing structural remodeling, is less affected because it can be reorganized to process non-visual information.

One of such non-visual information is auditory information. It has been found that people who are blind may have enhanced perceptual and attentional sensitivity, allowing them to better identify different auditory stimuli, such as speech sounds, and to have better spatial localization of sound. Studies have shown that this occurs because the connections in the right dorsal visual stream are repurposed for the spatial localization of sound in the auditory cortex. As a result, spatial detection of sound can be interrupted in early-blind individuals (blind from an early age) by inducing a virtual lesion in the visual cortex using transcranial magnetic stimulation, which further confirms the reorganization of the visual cortex as spatial detection of sound is typically localized to the auditory cortex.

The somatosensory cortex is also able to recruit the visual cortex to assist with tactile sensation by cross modal plasticity reworking the network structure of the brain, leading to increased connections between the somatosensory and visual cortices. Furthermore, the somatosensory cortex acts as a hub region of nerve connections in the brain for the early-blind. With this cross-modal networking, the early-blind are able to react to tactile stimuli with greater speed and accuracy, as the recruitment and reorganization of the visual cortex to support the existing somatosensory pathways leads to enhanced tactile perception. One element of the visual system that the somatosensory cortex is able to recruit is the dorsal-visual stream. The dorsal stream is used by the sighted to identify spatial information visually, but the early-blind use it during tactile sensation of 3D objects. However, both sighted and blind participants used the dorsal stream to process spatial information, suggesting that cross modal plasticity in the blind re-routed the dorsal visual stream to work with the sense of touch rather than changing the overall function of the stream.

=== Experience dependence ===
There is evidence that the degree of cross modal plasticity between the somatosensory and visual cortices is experience-dependent. In a study using tactile tongue devices to transmit spatial information, early-blind individuals were able to show visual cortex activations after 1 week of training with the device. Although there were no cross modal connections at the start, the early-blind were able to develop connections between the somatosensory and visual cortices while sighted controls were unable to. Early or congenitally blind individuals have stronger cross modal connections the earlier they began learning Braille. An earlier start allows for stronger connections to form as early-blind children have to grow up using their sense of touch to read instead of using their sight. Perhaps due to these cross modal connections, sensory testing studies have shown that people who are born blind and read braille proficiently perceive through touch more rapidly than others. Furthermore, tactile spatial acuity is enhanced in blindness and this enhancement is experience-dependent.

== Plasticity after auditory deficit ==
Cross modal plasticity can also occur in pre-lingual deaf individuals. A functional magnetic resonance imaging (fMRI) study found that deaf participants use the primary auditory cortex as well as the visual cortex when they observe sign language. Although the auditory cortex no longer receives input from the ears, individuals who are deaf can still use specific regions of the cortex to process visual stimuli. Primary sensory abilities like brightness discrimination, visual contrast sensitivity, temporal discrimination thresholds, temporal resolution, and discrimination thresholds for motion directions do not appear to change in the loss of a modality like hearing. However, higher-level processing tasks may undergo compensating changes. In the case of auditory deprivation, some of these compensations appear to affect visual periphery processing and movement detection in peripheral vision.

Individuals who are deaf lack auditory input, so the auditory cortex is instead used to assist with visual and language processing. Auditory activations also appear to be attention-dependent in the deaf. However, the process of visual attention in the deaf is not significantly different from that of hearing subjects. Stronger activations of the auditory cortex during visual observation occur when deaf individuals pay attention to a visual cue, and the activations are weaker if the cue is not in the direct line of sight. One study found that deaf participants process peripheral visual stimuli more quickly than hearing subjects. Deafness appears to heighten spatial attention to the peripheral visual field, but not the central one. The brain thus seems to compensate for the auditory loss within its visual system by enhancing peripheral field attention resources; however, central visual resources may suffer.

Improvements tend to be limited to areas in the brain dedicated to both auditory and visual stimuli, not simply rewriting audio-dedicated areas into visual areas. The visual enhancements seem to be especially focused in areas of the brain that normally process convergence with auditory input. This is specifically seen in studies showing changes in the posterior parietal cortex of deaf individuals, which is both one of the main centers for visual attention but also an area known for integrating information from various senses.

Recent research indicates that in attention-based tasks such as object tracking and enumeration, deaf subjects perform no better than hearing subjects. Improvement in visual processing is still observed, even when a deaf subject is not paying attention to the direct stimulus. A study published in 2011 found that congenitally deaf subjects had significantly larger neuroretinal rim areas than hearing subjects, which suggests that deaf subjects may have a greater concentration of retinal ganglion cells.

=== Sign language ===
Deaf individuals often use sign language as their mode of communication. Recent studies show that sign language use is linked to increased grey matter volume in the right hemisphere of both native deaf and hearing signers. However, sign language alone does not appear to significantly change brain organization in terms of functional changes. In fact, neuroimaging and electrophysiology data studying functional changes in visual pathways, as well as animal studies of sensory deprivation, have shown that the enhancement in attention of peripheral visual processing found in deaf individuals is not found in hearing signers.

The peripheral visual changes are seen in all forms of deaf individuals – signers, oral communicators, etc. Comparative fMRIs of hearing speakers and hearing early signers, on the other hand, show comparable peripheral activation. The enhancement in attention of peripheral visual processing found in deaf individuals has not been found in hearing signers. It is therefore unlikely that signing causes the neurological differences in visual attention.

=== Cochlear implants ===
Another way to see cross modal plasticity in the deaf is when looking at the effects of installing cochlear implants. For those who became deaf pre-lingually, cross modal plasticity interfered with their ability to process language using a cochlear implant. For the pre-lingual deaf, the auditory cortex has been reshaped to deal with visual information, so it cannot deal as well with the new sensory input that the implant provides. However, for post-lingual deaf their experience with visual cues like lip reading can help them understand speech better along with the assistance of a cochlear implant. The post-lingual deaf do not have as much recruitment of the auditory cortex as the early deaf, so they perform better with cochlear implants. It was also found that the visual cortex was activated only when the sounds that were received had potential meaning. For instance, the visual cortex activated for words but not for vowels. This activation is further evidence that cross modal plasticity is attention dependent.

== Plasticity after olfactory deficit or whisker trimming ==
Cross-modal plasticity can be mutually induced between two sensory modalities such as olfctory function and whisker tactile sensation. In terms of cellular mechanisms, the coordinated plasticity between cortical excitatory and inhibitory neurons is associated with these upregulations of sensory behaviors. The deprivation of olfactory function upregulates whisker tactile sensation. This occurs as post-olfactory injury, more GABAergic neurons are recruited to the barrel cortex, leading to increased tactile sensation via the whiskers.

On the other hand, the trimming of whiskers upregulates olfactory function. Studies have shown the loss of tactile input from whiskers results in increased activity of pyramidal neurons in the piriform cortex as there is increased activity in the pyramidal excitatory neurons and decreased activity in the pyramidal GABAergic neurons. As a result, olfactory sensation is enhanced.

=== Olfactory deficit in humans ===
In humans, loss of smell also leads to structural and functional changes in the brain. These changes include increased functional connectivity between the olfactory cortex and brain areas involved in multisensory integration, like the angular gyrus. As a result, loss of smell is often linked to enhanced sensory integration, particularly in visual processing. Thus, individuals with olfactory deficits may show an increase in their ability for multi-sensory integration.
