= Naghi =

Naghi may refer to:

- Ali Naghi (disambiguation), a given name and place name
- Naghi Sheykhzamanli, Azerbaijani political figure and the head of the counterintelligence service of Azerbaijan
- Naghi (surname)

== See also ==
- Nagui, another spelling variant of "Naqi"
