= Nagy =

Nagy (Hungarian: [ˈnɒɟ]) is a common Hungarian surname, meaning 'big'.

The surname is also common among ethnic Hungarians in the northern Serbian province of Vojvodina, where it is spelled Nađ (Serbian Cyrillic: Нађ) and may be transliterated in other languages as Nadj.

In Romania, the name Nagy is sometimes rendered as Naghi. The name also appears in Slovak and Czech languages, where the feminine form is Nagyová. The name Nagy is transliterated into Russian and Ukrainian as Надь and rendered in English as Nad.

The top three most frequent surnames in Hungary are Nagy, Kovács and Tóth. It is also among the top three Hungarian surnames in Romania: (Szabó, Nagy, Kovács).

A number of Hungarian nationals changed their names meaning 'big' in other languages (Gross/Grosz, Velký/Welky) to 'Nagy' during the Magyarization of personal names.

Notable people with the surname include:

== Arts and entertainment ==
- Attila Nagy (actor) (1933–1992), Hungarian actor
- Bella Nagy (1879–1947), Hungarian actress
- Dávid Nagy (guitarist) (born 1981), Hungarian guitarist
- Feró Nagy (born 1946), Hungarian rock singer
- Gáspár Nagy (1949–2007), Hungarian poet and writer
- Ibolya Nagy (1864–1946), Hungarian actress
- István Nagy (actor) (1909–1976), Hungarian actor
- István Nagy (painter) (1873–1937), Hungarian painter
- Jenene Nagy, American installation artist
- Judita Nagyová, Slovak opera singer
- László Nagy (poet) (1925–1978), Hungarian poet
- Peter Nagy (artist) (1959–2026), American artist
- Peter Nagy (singer) (born 1959), Slovak musician
- Phyllis Nagy (born 1962), American theater and film director
- Robert Nagy (tenor) (1929–2008), American opera singer

== Sports ==
=== Association football ===
- Ádám Nagy (born 1995), Hungarian footballer
- Andrej Prean Nagy (1923–1997), Hungarian footballer
- Antal Nagy (footballer born 1944), Hungarian footballer
- Antal Nagy (footballer born 1956), Hungarian footballer
- Dániel Nagy (footballer, born 1984), Hungarian footballer
- Dániel Nagy (footballer, born 1991), Hungarian footballer
- Dominik Nagy (born 1995), Hungarian footballer
- Gábor Nagy (footballer born 1981), Hungarian footballer
- Gábor Nagy (footballer born 1985), Hungarian footballer
- Gyula Nagy (1924–1996), Hungarian footballer
- István Nagy (footballer, born 1939) (1939–1999), Hungarian footballer
- István Nagy (footballer, born 1986), Hungarian footballer
- János Nagy (footballer) (born 1992), Hungarian footballer
- József Nagy (footballer, born 1892) (1892–1963), Hungarian football coach
- József Nagy (footballer, born 1960), Hungarian footballer
- József Nagy (footballer, born 1988), Hungarian footballer
- Lajos Nagy (footballer) (born 1975), Hungarian footballer
- László Nagy (footballer) (born 1949), Hungarian footballer
- Olivér Nagy (footballer, born 1989), Hungarian footballer
- Róbert Nagy (footballer) (born 1987), Hungarian footballer
- Sándor Nagy (footballer, born 1988), Hungarian footballer
- Tibor Nagy (footballer born 1991), Hungarian footballer
- Timo Nagy (born 1983), German footballer
- Zoltán Nagy (footballer born 1974), Hungarian football player and coach
- Zoltán Nagy (footballer born 1985), Hungarian footballer
- Zsolt Nagy (footballer, born 1979), Hungarian footballer
- Zsolt Nagy (footballer, born 1993), Hungarian footballer

=== Other sports ===
- Adrienn Nagy (born 2001), Hungarian tennis player
- Andrea Nagy (born 1971), Hungarian basketball player
- Anikó Nagy (born 1970), Hungarian handball player
- Béla Nagy (archer) (1943–2025), Hungarian archer
- Bill Nagy (American football) (born 1987), American football center and guard
- Charles Nagy (born 1967), American baseball pitcher
- Dániel Nagy (racing driver) (born 1998), Hungarian racing driver
- Dávid Nagy (fencer) (born 1999), Hungarian fencer
- Dick Nagy (1942–2021), American college basketball coach
- Ferenc Nagy (boxer) (1916–1977), Hungarian boxer
- Fritz Nagy (1924–1989), American basketball player
- George Nagy (born 1957), Canadian swimmer
- Géza Nagy (1892–1953), Hungarian chess master
- György Nagy (1924–2004), Hungarian basketball player
- György Nagy (curler) (born 1965), Hungarian curler
- Henrieta Nagyová (born 1978), Slovak tennis player
- Ilona Nagy (born 1951), Hungarian handball player
- Imre Nagy (pentathlete) (1933–2013), Hungarian pentathlete
- Imre Nagy (fencer) (1941–2011), Canadian fencer
- István Nagy (athlete) (born 1959), Hungarian sprinter
- Ján Nagy (1945–2025), Slovak weightlifter
- József Nagy (athlete) (1884–1952), Hungarian athlete
- József Nagy (boxer, born 1934), Hungarian boxer
- József Nagy (boxer, born 1953), Hungarian boxer
- József Nagy (boxer, born 1975), Hungarian boxer
- Kira Nagy (born 1977), Hungarian tennis player
- Krisztina Nagy, Hungarian table tennis player
- Ladislav Nagy (born 1979), Slovak ice hockey player
- László Nagy (canoeist), Hungarian sprint canoeist
- László Nagy (figure skater) (1927–2005), Hungarian figure skater
- László Nagy (handballer) (born 1981), Hungarian handball player
- Marianna Nagy (figure skater) (1929–2011), Hungarian pair skater
- Marianna Nagy (handballer) (born 1957), Hungarian handball player
- Matt Nagy (born 1978), American football coach and quarterback
- Max Nagy (born 1999), English rugby union player
- Mike Nagy (born 1948), American baseball pitcher
- Orsolya Nagy (born 1977), Hungarian fencer
- Peter Nagy (canoeist) (born 1964), Slovak slalom canoeist
- Péter Nagy (volleyball) (born 1984), Hungarian volleyball player
- Péter Nagy (weightlifter) (born 1986), Hungarian weightlifter
- Péter Nagy (tennis) (born 1992), Hungarian tennis player
- Róbert Nagy (cyclist) (born 1972), Slovak cyclist
- Róbert Nagy (speedway rider) (born 1967), Hungarian motorcycle speedway rider
- Róbert Nagy (weightlifter) (born 1940), Hungarian weightlifter
- Robert Nagy (windsurfer) (born 1963), French windsurfer
- Scott Nagy (born 1966), American college basketball coach
- Stefan Nagy (born 1961), Swedish darts player
- Steve Nagy (baseball) (1919–2016), American baseball player
- Tibor Nagy (canoeist), Hungarian sprint canoeist
- Tímea Nagy (born 1970), Hungarian fencer
- Vilmos Nagy, Hungarian sprint canoer
- Zoltán Nagy (ice hockey) (born 1955), Romanian ice hockey player
- Zsuzsanna Nagy (born 1986), Hungarian ice dancer

== Other ==
- Antal Nagy de Buda, Hungarian petty nobleman
- Dennis M. Nagy, director of the U.S. Defense Intelligence Agency
- Ferenc Nagy (1903–1979), Hungarian politician
- Gregory Nagy (born 1942), American classical scholar
- Imre Nagy (1896–1958), Hungarian politician, twice Prime Minister of Hungary
- István Nagy (politician, born 1954) (born 1954), Hungarian politician
- István Nagy (politician, born 1967) (born 1967), Hungarian agrarian engineer and politician
- Jana Nagyová (actress) (born 1959), Slovak actress
- Jana Nagyová (politician) (born 1970), Czech politician
- János Nagy (diplomat) (born 1928), Hungarian diplomat and politician
- John A. Nagy, American espionage author
- József Nagy (politician) (born 1968), Slovak economist politician
- Károly Nagy, Hungarian astronomer, mathematician, chemist and politician
- Lajos Nagy aka Louis I of Hungary (1326–1382), Hungarian king
- László Nagy (Scouting) (1921–2009), Hungarian-Swiss jurist, writer and scouting pioneer
- László B. Nagy (born 1958), Hungarian politician
- Mária J. Nagy (1934–2025), Hungarian academic
- Nicholas Nagy-Talavera (1929–2000), Hungarian-American dissident and professor
- Stanislaw Nagy (1921–2013), Polish cardinal of the Roman Catholic Church
- Tibor P. Nagy (born 1949), Hungarian-American diplomat
- Tímea Nagy (activist) (born 1978), Hungarian-Canadian activist
- Vilmos Nagy de Nagybaczon (1884–1976), Hungarian general
- Vince Nagy (1886–1965), Hungarian politician
- Zsolt Nagy (politician) (born 1971), Romanian politician

== People partly or formerly named Nagy ==
- Michel Varga (born Balázs Nagy, 1927–2015), Hungarian-French activist
- Béla Szőkefalvi-Nagy (1913–1998), Hungarian mathematician
- Ivan Boszormenyi-Nagy (1920–2007), therapist and writer on family relations
- Jana Nečasová (born Jana Nagyová, 1964), Czech politician
- Judit Földing-Nagy, Hungarian marathon runner
- Gábor Takács-Nagy (born 1956), Hungarian violinist and conductor
- László Moholy-Nagy (1895–1946), Hungarian painter and photographer
- Marcell Deák-Nagy (born 1992), Hungarian sprinter
- Sibyl Moholy-Nagy (1903–1971), German-American art historian

== See also ==
- Nagy Aguilera (born 1968), Dominican Republic boxer
- Nagy Habib (born 1952), Egyptian professor and surgeon
