= Ali Naqi =

Ali Naqi (علی نقی), also spelled as Ali Naghi, may refer to:

- Ali Naqi, alternate name of Sarab-e Alinaqi, a village in Iran
- Ali al-Hadi, also known as Ali al-Naqi, the 10th Shia Imam
- Ali Naqi Naqvi (1905–1988), Indian grand ayatollah
- Ali-Naqi Vaziri (1887–1979), Iranian musicologist
- Mohammad Ali Naqi, Bangladeshi architect and the vice-chancellor of Stamford University Bangladesh
