= Naghi (surname) =

Naghi is a Romanian language transliteration of the Hungarian surname Nagy. Notable people with this surname include:

- Gheorghe Naghi (1932–2019), Romanian film director
- George Naghi (1952-2011), Romanian businessman
- Gabriel Naghi (born 1962), Romanian general, director of the Protection and Guard Service from 2000 to 2005
- Iosif Naghi (1946-2018), Romanian athlete
- Liviu Naghi, Romanian basketball player
