= Sarab-e Alinaqi =

Sarab-e Alinaqi سرابعلينقي
- Village
- Location within Iran
- Coordinates: 33°35′09″N 48°37′27″E
- Country: Iran
- Province: Lorestan
- County: Khorramabad
- Bakhsh: Bayravand
- Rural District: Beyranvand-e Jonubi

Population (2006)
  - Total: 118
- Time zone: UTC+3:30 (IRST)
  - Summer (DST): UTC+4:30 (IRDT)

Sarab-e Alinaqi (Persian: سرابعلينقي, also Romanized as Sarāb-e ‘Alīnaqī; also known as ‘Ali Nākhi, ‘Alī Naqī, Sarāb-e Yās, and Sarāb Yās) is a village in Beyranvand-e Jonubi Rural District, Bayravand District, Khorramabad County, Lorestan Province, Iran. At the 2006 census, its population was 118, in 27 families.
