= The Butterflies of Zagorsk =

1990 British television documentary

- Genre: Documentary
- Developed by: Ann Paul
- Narrated by: Michael Dean
- Country of origin: United Kingdom
- Original language: English
- No. of episodes: 1

Production
- Producer: Michael Dean
- Running time: 60 minutes

Original release
- Network: BBC
- Release: 1990

The Butterflies of Zagorsk was a documentary produced by the BBC, narrated by Michael Dean, and first broadcast in the United Kingdom in 1990. It tells the story of the remarkable teaching methods for children at the deaf-blind school in Zagorsk, 40 miles (64 km) north of Moscow.

== The series ==
- Teacher's Story, A – Out of the Wilderness (1990)
- Teacher's Story, A – Socrates for Six Year Olds (1990)
- Teacher's Story, A – The Butterflies of Zagorsk (1990)
