= Post-lingual deafness =

Deafness after speech acquisition

Post-lingual deafness is a deafness which develops after the acquisition of speech and language, usually after the age of six.

Post-lingual hearing loss is far more common than prelingual deafness. Typically, hearing loss is gradual, and often detected by family and friends of the people so affected long before the patients themselves will acknowledge the disability.

== Causes ==
In some cases, the loss is extremely sudden and can be traced to specific diseases, such as meningitis, or to ototoxic medications, such as Gentamicin. In both cases, the final degree of loss varies. Some experience only partial loss, while others become profoundly deaf. Hearing aids and cochlear implants may be used to regain a sense of hearing, with different people experiencing differing degrees of success. It is possible that the affected person may need to rely on speechreading and/or sign language for communication.

In most cases the loss is a long-term degradation in hearing loss. Discrediting earlier notions of presbycusis, Rosen demonstrated that long-term hearing loss is usually the product of chronic exposure to environmental noise in industrialized countries (Rosen, 1965). The U.S. Environmental Protection Agency has asserted the same sentiment and testified before the U.S. Congress that approximately 34 million Americans are exposed to noise pollution levels (mostly from roadway and aircraft noise) that expose humans to noise health effects including the risk of hearing loss (EPA, 1972).

Certain genetic conditions can also lead to post-lingual deafness. In contrast to genetic causes of pre-lingual deafness, which are frequently autosomal recessive, genetic causes of post-lingual deafness tend to be autosomal dominant.

== Treatment ==
In cases where the causes are environmental, the treatment is to eliminate or reduce these causes first of all, and then to fit patients with a hearing aid, especially if they are elderly. When the loss is due to heredity, total deafness is often the result. On the one hand, persons who experience a gradual deterioration of their hearing are fortunate in that they have learned to speak. Ultimately the affected person may bridge communication problems by becoming skilled in sign language, speech-reading, using a hearing aid, or accepting elective surgery to use a prosthetic device such as a cochlear implant.

== Social impact ==
Those who lose their hearing later in life, such as in late adolescence or adulthood, face their own challenges. For example, they must adjust to living with the adaptations that make it possible for them to live independently. They may have to adapt to using hearing aids or a cochlear implant, develop speech-reading skills, and/or learn sign language. The affected person may need to use a TTY, a videophone, an interpreter, or a relay service to communicate over the telephone. Loneliness and depression can arise as a result of isolation (from the inability to communicate with friends and loved ones) and difficulty in accepting their disability. The challenge is made greater by the need for those around them to adapt to the person's hearing loss.

== See also ==
- Noise Pollution
- Noise regulation
- Hearing loss
