= Nađ =

Nađ is a Serbian-language phonetic transcription of the Hungarian surname Nagy. Notable people with this surname include:

- Albert Nađ (born 1974), footballer
- Antonija Nađ (born 1986), sprint canoer
- Kosta Nađ (1911–1986), Yugoslav Army general
- Stevan Nađ (1903–1982), Yugoslav wrestler
