= National Association of the Deaf =

National Association of the Deaf may refer to:

- National Association of the Deaf (Italy)
- National Association of the Deaf (India)
- National Association of the Deaf (United States)
- National Deaf Federation Nepal
