= Nad (surname) =

Nad is an English language transliteration of the East Slavic spelling "Надь" of the Hungarian surname Nagy. Notable people with this surname include:

- Oleksandr Nad (born 1985), Ukrainian footballer of Hungarian ethnicity
- Olga Nad (born 1966), Soviet and Russian footballer

Nađ is a Serbian-language phonetic transcription of the Hungarian surname Nagy. Notable people with this surname include:

- Albert Nađ (born 1974), footballer
- Antonija Nađ (born 1986), sprint canoer
- Kosta Nađ (1911–1986), Yugoslav Army general
- Stevan Nađ (1903–1982), Yugoslav wrestler
