= Prelingual deafness =

Deafness before language is learned

Prelingual deafness refers to deafness that occurs before learning speech or language. Speech and language typically begin to develop very early with infants saying their first words by age one. Therefore, prelingual deafness is considered to occur before the age of one, where a baby is either born deaf (known as congenital deafness) or loses hearing before the age of one. This hearing loss may occur for a variety of reasons and impacts cognitive, social, and language development.

== Statistics ==
There are approximately 12,000 children with hearing loss in the United States. Profound hearing loss occurs in somewhere between 4 and 11 per every 10,000 children. In 2017, according to the CDC, of the 3,742,608 babies screened, 3,896 were diagnosed with hearing loss before the age of three months or 1.7 babies per 1,000 births were diagnosed with hearing loss in the United States.

== Causes ==
Prelingual hearing loss can be considered congenital, present at birth, or acquired, occurring after birth before the age of one. Congenital hearing loss can be a result of maternal factors (rubella, cytomegalovirus, or herpes simplex virus, syphilis, diabetes), infections, toxicity (pharmaceutical drugs, alcohol, other drugs), asphyxia, trauma, low birth weight, prematurity, jaundice, and complications associated with the Rh factor in the blood. These nongenetic factors account for about one fourth of the congenital hearing losses in infants while genetic factors account for over half of the infants with congenital hearing loss. Most of genetic factors are caused by an autosomal recessive hearing loss or an autosomal dominant hearing loss. Autosomal recessive hearing loss is when both parents carry the recessive gene, and pass it on to their child. The autosomal dominant hearing loss is when an abnormal gene from one parent is able to cause hearing loss even though the matching gene from the other parent is normal. This can lead to genetic syndromes, such as Down syndrome, Usher syndrome or Waardenburg syndrome, which are concomitant with hearing loss. Acquired hearing loss can be the result of toxicity (drugs given as treatment when in the neonatal intensive care unit) and infections such as meningitis.

== Treatment ==
Hearing aids and cochlear implants may make the child able to hear sounds in their hearing range, but do not restore normal hearing. Cochlear implants can stimulate the auditory nerve directly to restore some hearing, but the sound quality isn't that of a normal hearing ear, suggesting that deafness cannot be fully overcome by medical devices. Some say that the benefits and safety of cochlear implants continues to grow, especially when children with implants receive a lot of oral educational support. It is a goal for some audiologists to test and fit a deaf child with a cochlear implant by six months of age, so that they don't get behind in learning language. In fact, there are expectations that if children get fit for implants early enough, they can acquire verbal language skills to the same level as their peers with normal hearing.

== Social and cognitive impact ==
Children who are prelingually deaf and cannot hear noise beneath 60 decibels—about the intensity level of a vacuum cleaner—do not develop oral language comparable to their peers. Children born with profound hearing impairment, 90 decibels and above (about the level of a food blender), are classified as functionally deaf. These children do not develop speech skills without help from a speech pathologist. Such children display speech comprehension difficulties, even when other modes of language (such as writing and signing) are up to their age level standard. Children who lose their hearing after they have acquired some amount of language, even if it is just for a short while, demonstrate a much higher level of linguistic achievement than those who have not had any language exposure.

In children, this type of hearing loss can lead to social isolation for several reasons. First, the child experiences delayed social development that is in large part tied to delayed language acquisition (e.g., language deprivation). It is also directly tied to their inability to pick up auditory social cues. A child who uses sign language, or identifies with the Deaf culture does not generally experience this isolation, particularly if they attend a school for the deaf, but may conversely experience isolation from their parents if they do not know, or make an effort to learn sign language. A child who is exclusively or predominantly an oral communicator can experience social isolation from their hearing peers, particularly if no one takes the time to explicitly teach them social skills that other children acquire independently by virtue of having normal hearing.

== Language acquisition ==
=== Speech acquisition ===
Deaf children do not acquire speech the same as hearing children because they cannot hear the language spoken around them. Spoken language is based on combining speech sounds to form words which are then organized by grammatical rules in order to convey a message. This message is language. In normal language acquisition, auditory comprehension of speech sounds precedes the development of language. Without auditory input, a person with prelingual deafness is forced to acquire speech visually through lip-reading. Acquiring spoken language through lip-reading alone is challenging for the deaf child because it does not always accurately represent speech sounds. The likelihood of a deaf child successfully learning to speak is based on a variety of factors including: ability to discriminate between speech sounds, a higher than average non-verbal IQ, and a higher socioeconomic status. Despite being fitted with hearing aids or provided with oral instruction and speech therapy at a young age, prelingually deaf children are unlikely to ever develop perfect speech and speech-reception skills. Some researchers conclude that deaf children taught exclusively through spoken language appear to pass through the same general stages of language acquisition as their hearing peers but without reaching the same ultimate level of proficiency. Spoken language that may develop for prelingually deaf children is severely delayed.

==== Cochlear implants ====
Speech perception can be corrected prior to language acquisition with cochlear implants. After a year and a half of experience, researchers found the deaf culture was able to identify words and comprehend the movements of others' lips. There is a greater opportunity to hear a sound depending on the location of electrodes compared to the tissue and the number of remaining neurons located in the auditory system. In addition, individual capacities, as well as the neural supply to the cochlea, play a role in the process of learning with cochlear implantation.

Research has continuously found that early implantation leads to better performance than older implantation. Studies continue to show that children with prelingual deafness are able to interact in society comfortably when implantation occurs before the age of five. Exposure to non-auditory signals prior to implantation may negatively affect the ability to process speech after the implantation. Speech production is a slower procedure in the beginning since creating words requires more effort. Children who had almost two years of experience with cochlear implants were able to generate diphthongs and sound out most vowels. They develop skills to understand more information as well as put together letters.

Cochlear implants give deaf individuals the chance to understand auditory messages. Progress was analyzed after several groups of children were given vocabulary and language tests. After three years of practice, the children with the devices did as well as children that had no previous issues with hearing. Specifically, cochlear implants allow children with prelingual deafness to acquire skills similar to children with minimal or mild hearing loss.

=== Sign language acquisition ===
There is an innate desire to produce language in both hearing and deaf population. All babies vocalize to communicate. Deaf children who have not been exposed to sign language create their own gesture communication known as homesign for the purpose of expressing what they are feeling. This term refers to gestures that are being used by deaf individuals who were reared in isolation from other deaf signers. Homesign is viewed as a biological component of language because it originates directly from the deaf child and because it is a global occurrence, transcending culture.

Sign language, such as American Sign Language (ASL), is a well known form of communication that is linguistic for both hearing and deaf individuals. Deaf children learning a sign language such as ASL go through a series of language milestones from birth through one year of age. These milestones are similar to those of spoken language. A deaf child is aware of their environment, enjoys human interaction, smiles, and enjoys hand play from birth to 3 months of age. From 3–6 months a deaf child also begins to babble, referred to as finger babbling. These gestures of the deaf children do not have real meaning, any more than babble noises have meaning, but they are more deliberate than the random finger flutters and fist clenches of hearing babies. Between 6–12 months, deaf children use manual communication and communicate with gestures, such as pulling and pointing. Many deaf children sign their first word around 8 months and up to 10 or more signs by 12 months.

==== Reading and short-term memory ====
Learning three-dimensional grammar, such as in ASL, boosts the child's visual and spatial abilities to higher than average levels. To succeed at learning to read, the deaf child must have a strong language to base it upon. Additionally, communication difficulties with the teacher can impair reading.

Additionally, deaf children performed more poorly in short-term memory spans for written words in comparison to age-matched hearing children simply because they are not as familiar with English words. Short-term memory spans for signs and fingerspelling are also reduced in comparison to age-matched hearing children's span for spoken words. Deaf children vary widely in their developmental experience with sign language, which affects development of short-term memory processes. Children who begin language acquisition at older ages and/or have limited language input during early childhood have underdeveloped sign language skill, which, in turn, affects their short-term memory development. However, with the linguistic element removed, deaf children's performance is equivalent to age-matched hearing children on short-term memory tasks.

==== Children of deaf parents ====
Mothers who are deaf themselves model signs during face-to-face interactions with their deaf babies. They mold the hands of their babies to form shapes of signs. They exaggerate their facial expressions and provide models in the direct line of vision of their deaf babies. Caregivers of both hearing children and deaf children reinforce the child's early attempts at communication, thus encouraging further and more elaborate communication.

Deaf students who have deaf parents outperform their deaf peers who have hearing parents on every subtest of the WISC-R performance scale. This is due to the fact that deaf parents are better prepared than hearing parents to meet the early learning needs of the deaf child; thus, they acquire language 'on schedule'. Additionally, deaf children of deaf parents pass through language development stages earlier because the visual pathways are fully myelinated at an earlier age than the comparable auditory pathways.

=== Neuropsychological function ===
Deaf children often have enhanced perceptual skills to compensate for the impaired auditory input, and this continues throughout adulthood. Congenitally deaf adults who used sign language showed ERPs that were 5-6 times larger than those of hearing adults over the Left and Right occipital regions and ERPs 2-3 times larger than hearing participants over the left temporal and parietal regions (which are responsible for linguistic processing). Because both hearing and deaf adults using ASL showed larger ERPs occipital regions, the heightened response to visual stimuli is also due to knowing and using sign language and not only due to deafness.

Both hearing and deaf adults using ASL also show larger ERPs over the left than right hemisphere. Since the left hemisphere is responsible for language, this implies that sign movement is linguistically salient. The movement processed on the left side (language) implies that the right visual field is stronger in deaf and hearing ASL due to the hemispheric association being contralateral.

=== Sociocultural factors ===
Deaf children from a lower socioeconomic status are at a high risk for not being exposed to accessible language at the right time in early childhood. This is because in most countries poverty translates into a lack of access to the educational and clinical services that expose deaf children to language at the appropriate age.

Academic achievement of deaf students is predicted to a large extent by the same factors that predict the academic achievement of normally hearing students, such as social class and the presence of additional handicapping conditions. This means that deafness, by itself, does not determine academic success or failure but rather interacts with many other factors in complex ways.

=== Early intervention ===
The deaf children of hearing parents may not have significant exposure to any language in early childhood. Because of their sensory loss, these children perceive little of their parents' speech. Because in most cases the parents do not sign the children are also not exposed to a conventional sign language. Until recently, education of deaf emphasized speech training and the deaf children also were not exposed to sign language in school.

Not being exposed to accessible language at a certain time in early childhood combined with lack of access to the educational and clinical services that expose deaf children to language at the appropriate age are all factors that contribute to language acquisition of prelingually deaf individuals.

== See also ==
- Congenital hearing loss
- Deaf history
- Deafness
- Hearing impairment
- Language exposure for deaf children
- List of notable deaf people
- Models of deafness
- The Butterflies of Zagorsk
- The Language Instinct
