= Italian language =

Romance language

Italian
- Standard Italian
- italiano, lingua italiana
- Pronunciation: [itaˈljaːno]
- Native to: Italy, San Marino, Vatican City, Switzerland, Istria
- Ethnicity: Italians
- Speakers: L1: 65 million (2022); L2: 3.1–21 million Total: 68–85 million
- Language family: Indo-European: Italic; Latino-Faliscan; Latin; Romance; Italo-Western; Italo-Dalmatian; Italo-Romance; Tuscan; Northern Tuscan; Florentine; Italian
- Early forms: Old Latin: Vulgar Latin; Tuscan; Florentine
- Dialects: Maltese Italian; Swiss Italian; Italo-Australian; Various forms of regional Italian
- Writing system: Latin script (Italian alphabet); Italian Braille
- Signed forms: Italiano segnato "(Signed Italian)" italiano segnato esatto "(Signed Exact Italian)"

Official status
- Official language in: 4 countries: Italy; San Marino; Switzerland; Vatican City; 2 regions: Slovene Istria (Slovenia); Croatian Istria (Croatia); Various organisations and orders: Sovereign Military Order of Malta; European Union; FAO; Holy See; OSCE; IDLO; IIHL; Mediterranean Universities Union; UNICRI; UNIDROIT; and others
- Recognised minority language in: 7 countries: Argentina; Bosnia and Herzegovina (Note: Recognised as a minority language by the European Charter for Regional or Minority Languages.); Brazil (6 municipalities); Croatia; Malta; Romania; Slovenia
- Regulated by: Accademia della Crusca (de facto)

Language codes
- ISO 639-1: it
- ISO 639-2: ita
- ISO 639-3: ita
- Glottolog: ital1282
- Linguasphere: 51-AAA-q
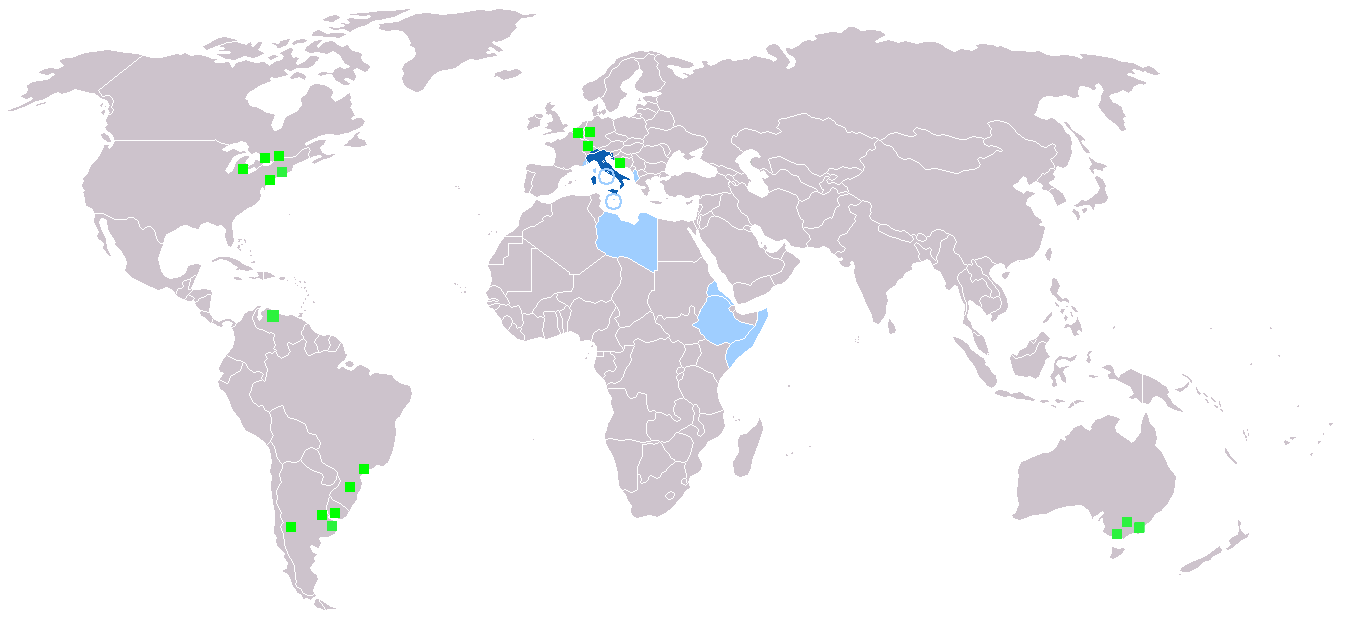
- Geographical distribution of the Italian language in the world: Areas where it is the majority language Areas where it is a minority language or where it was a former colonial language Areas where notable Italian-speaking communities are present

Italian (italiano, pronounced [itaˈljaːno], or lingua italiana, [ˈliŋɡwa itaˈljaːna]) is a Romance language of the Indo-European language family. Italian is a standardised form of literary Florentine Tuscan and, together with Sardinian, is the least differentiated Romance language from Latin by most measures. Current estimates indicate that between 68 and 85 million people speak Italian, including approximately 64 million native speakers as of 2024.

Italian is an official language in Italy, San Marino, Switzerland (Ticino and part of the Grisons), and Vatican City, and it has official minority status in Croatia, Slovenia (Istria), Romania, Bosnia and Herzegovina, and in 6 municipalities of Brazil. It is also spoken in other European and non-EU countries, most notably in Malta (by 66% of the population), Albania (upwards of 70%), and Monaco, as well as by large immigrant and expatriate communities in the Americas, Australia, and on other continents.

Italian is a major language in Europe, being one of the official languages of the Organization for Security and Co-operation in Europe and one of the working languages of the Council of Europe. It is the third-most-widely spoken native language in the European Union (13% of the EU population) and it is spoken as a second language by 13 million EU citizens (3%). Italian is the main working language of the Holy See, serving as the lingua franca in the Roman Catholic hierarchy and the official language of the Sovereign Military Order of Malta. Italian influence led to the development of derivated languages and dialects worldwide. It is also widespread in various sectors and markets, with its loanwords used in arts, luxury goods, fashion, sports and cuisine; it has a significant use in musical terminology and opera, with numerous Italian words referring to music that have become international terms taken into various languages worldwide, including in English.

Almost all native Italian words end with vowels, and the language has a 7-vowel sound system ("e" and "o" have mid-low and mid-high sounds). Italian has contrast between short and long consonants and gemination (doubling) of consonants.

== History ==
=== Origins ===
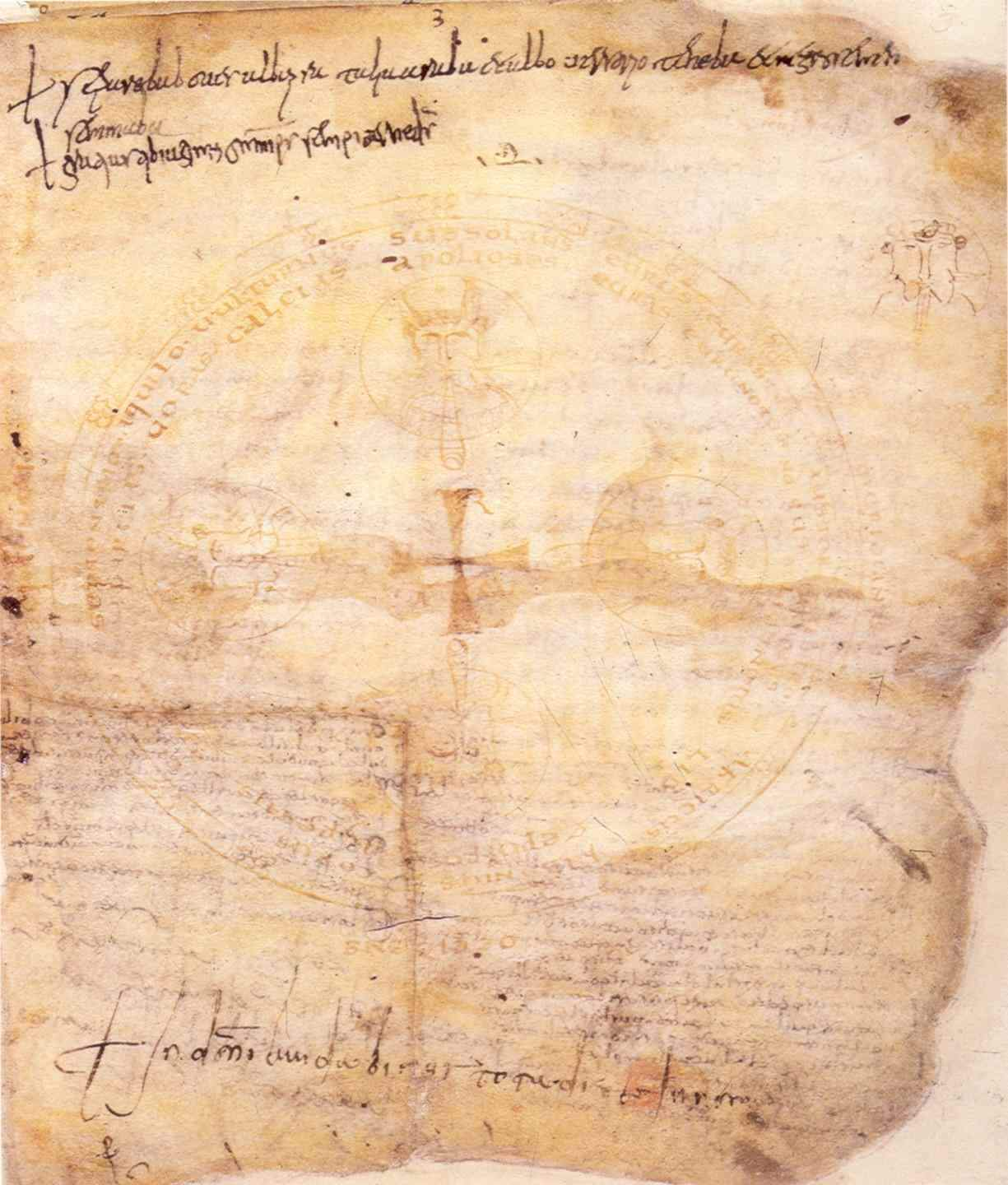
The Veronese Riddle (c. 8th or early 9th century), a riddle reflecting either a form of Medieval Latin or the earliest extant example of Romance vernacular in Italy

The Italian language has developed through a long and slow process, which began after the Western Roman Empire's fall and the onset of the Middle Ages in the 5th century.

Latin, the predominant language of the western Roman Empire, remained the established written language in Europe during the Middle Ages, although most people were illiterate. Over centuries, the Vulgar Latin popularly spoken in various areas of Europe—including the Italian peninsula—evolved into local varieties, or dialects, unaffected by formal standards and teachings. These varieties are not in any sense "dialects" of standard Italian, which itself started off as one of these local tongues, but sister languages of Italian. The Latin-speaking class referred to the collective Romance vernaculars of Europe as Romanz, Romance, or, in Italy, Romanzo or Volgare.

The linguistic and historical demarcations between late Vulgar Latin and early Romance varieties in Italy are imprecise. The earliest surviving texts that can definitely be called vernacular (as distinct from its predecessor Vulgar Latin) are legal formulae known as the Placiti Cassinesi from the province of Benevento that date from 960 to 963, although the Veronese Riddle, probably from the 8th or early 9th century, contains a late form of Vulgar Latin that can be seen as a very early sample of a vernacular dialect of Italy. The Commodilla catacomb inscription likewise probably dates to the early 9th century and appears to reflect a language somewhere between late Vulgar Latin and early vernacular.

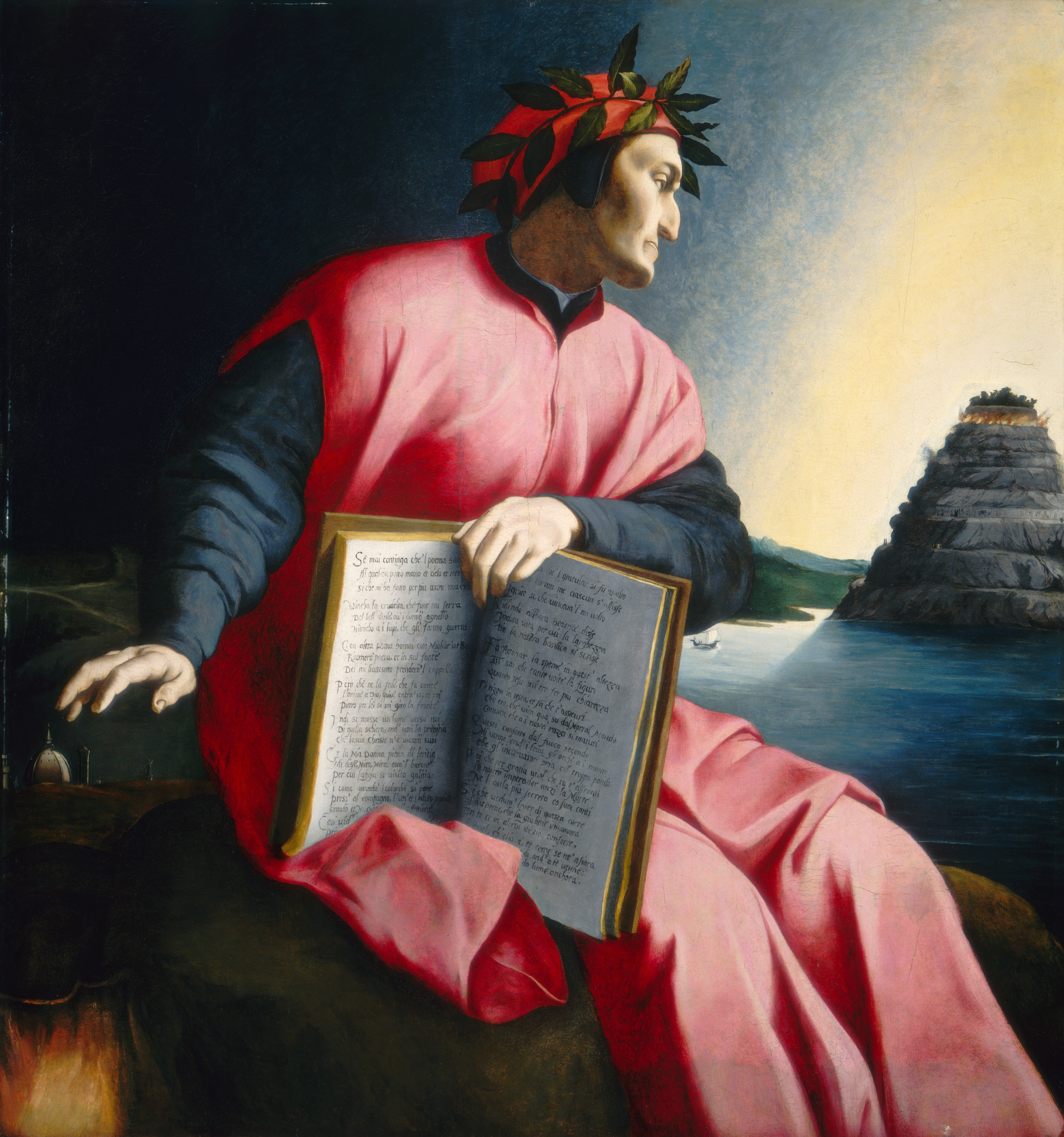
Dante Alighieri, whose works helped establish modern Italian language, is considered one of the greatest poets of the Middle Ages. His epic poem Divine Comedy ranks among the finest works of world literature.

The language that came to be thought of as Italian developed in central Tuscany and was first formalized in the early 14th century through the works of Tuscan writer Dante Alighieri, written in his native Florentine. Dante's epic poems, known collectively as the Commedia, to which another Tuscan poet Giovanni Boccaccio later affixed the title Divina, were read throughout the Italian peninsula. His written vernacular became the touchstone for elaborating a "canonical standard" that all educated Italians could understand. The poetry of Petrarch was also widely admired and influential in the development of the literary language, and would be identified as a model for vernacular writing by Pietro Bembo in the 16th century.

In addition to the widespread exposure gained through literature, Florentine also gained prestige due to the political and cultural significance of Florence at the time and the fact that it was linguistically a middle way between the northern and the southern Italian dialects.

Italian was progressively made an official language of most of the Italian states predating unification, slowly replacing Latin, even when ruled by foreign powers (such as Spain in the Kingdom of Naples, or Austria in the Kingdom of Lombardy–Venetia), although the masses kept speaking primarily their local vernaculars. Italian was also one of the many recognised languages in the Austro-Hungarian Empire.

Italy has always had a distinctive vernacular for each city because the cities, until recently, were thought of as city-states. Those local languages have considerable variety, and as Tuscan-derived Italian came to be used throughout Italy, features of local speech were naturally adopted, producing various versions of Regional Italian. The most characteristic differences, for instance, between Roman Italian and Milanese Italian are syntactic gemination of initial consonants in some contexts and the pronunciation of stressed "e", and of "s" between vowels in many words: e.g. va bene 'all right' is pronounced [vabˈbɛːne] by a Roman (and by any standard Italian speaker), [vaˈbeːne] by a Milanese (and by any speaker whose native dialect lies to the north of the La Spezia–Rimini Line); a casa 'at home' is [akˈkaːsa] for Roman, [akˈkaːsa] or [akˈkaːza] for standard, [aˈkaːza] for Milanese and generally northern.

In contrast to the Gallo-Italic linguistic panorama of northern Italy, the Italo-Dalmatian, Neapolitan and its related dialects were largely unaffected by the Franco-Occitan influences introduced to Italy mainly by bards from France during the Middle Ages, but after the Norman conquest of southern Italy, Sicily became the first Italian land to adopt Occitan lyric moods (and words) in poetry. Even in the case of northern Italian languages, however, scholars are careful not to overstate the effects of outsiders on the natural indigenous developments of the languages.

The economic might and relatively advanced development of Tuscany at the time (Late Middle Ages) gave its language weight, although Venetian remained widespread in medieval Italian commercial life, and Ligurian (or Genoese) remained in use in maritime trade alongside the Mediterranean. The increasing political and cultural relevance of Florence during the periods of the rise of the Medici Bank, humanism, and the Renaissance made its dialect, or rather a refined version of it, a standard in the arts.

=== Renaissance ===
The Renaissance era, known as il Rinascimento in Italian, was seen as a time of rebirth, which is the literal meaning of both renaissance (from French) and rinascimento (Italian). Among its many manifestations, the Renaissance saw a reinvigorated interest in both classical antiquity and vernacular literature.

Advancements in technology played a crucial role in the diffusion of the Italian language. The printing press was invented in the 15th century, and spread rapidly. By the year 1500, there were 56 printing presses in Italy, more than anywhere else in Europe. The printing press enabled the production of literature and documents in higher volumes and at lower cost, further accelerating the spread of Italian.

Italian became the language used in the courts of every state in the Italian peninsula, and the prestige variety used on the island of Corsica (but not in the neighbouring Sardinia, which on the contrary underwent Italianization well into the late 18th century, under Savoyard sway: the island's linguistic composition, roofed by the prestige of Spanish among the Sardinians, would therein make for a rather slow process of assimilation to the Italian cultural sphere). The rediscovery of Dante's De vulgari eloquentia, and a renewed interest in linguistics in the 16th century, sparked a debate that raged throughout Italy concerning the criteria that should govern the establishment of a modern Italian literary and spoken language. This discussion, known as questione della lingua (i.e., the problem of the language), ran through the Italian culture until the end of the 19th century, often linked to the political debate on achieving a united Italian state. Renaissance scholars divided into three main factions:

- The purists, headed by Venetian Pietro Bembo (who, in his Gli Asolani, claimed the language might be based only on the great literary classics, such as Petrarch and some part of Boccaccio). The purists thought the Divine Comedy was not dignified enough because it used elements from non-lyric registers of the language.
- Niccolò Machiavelli and other Florentines preferred the version spoken by ordinary people in their own times.
- The courtiers, such as Baldassare Castiglione and Gian Giorgio Trissino, insisted that each local vernacular contribute to the new standard.

A fourth faction claimed that the best Italian was the one that the papal court adopted, which was a mixture of the Tuscan and Roman dialects. Eventually, Bembo's ideas prevailed, and the foundation of the Accademia della Crusca in Florence (1582–1583), the official legislative body of the Italian language, led to the publication of Agnolo Monosini's Latin tome Floris italicae linguae libri novem in 1604 followed by the first Italian dictionary in 1612.

=== Modern era ===
An important event that helped the diffusion of Italian was the conquest and occupation of Italy by Napoleon (himself of Italian-Corsican descent) in the early 19th century. This conquest propelled the unification of Italy some decades after and pushed the Italian language into the status of a lingua franca, used not only among clerks, nobility, and functionaries in the Italian courts, but also by the bourgeoisie.

Today Italy has reached linguistic unity and an overwhelming majority of its 56 million citizens speak Italian. Many dialects are still alive, especially by the older generations. Today, Italian is one of the most studied foreign languages in the world.

=== Contemporary times ===
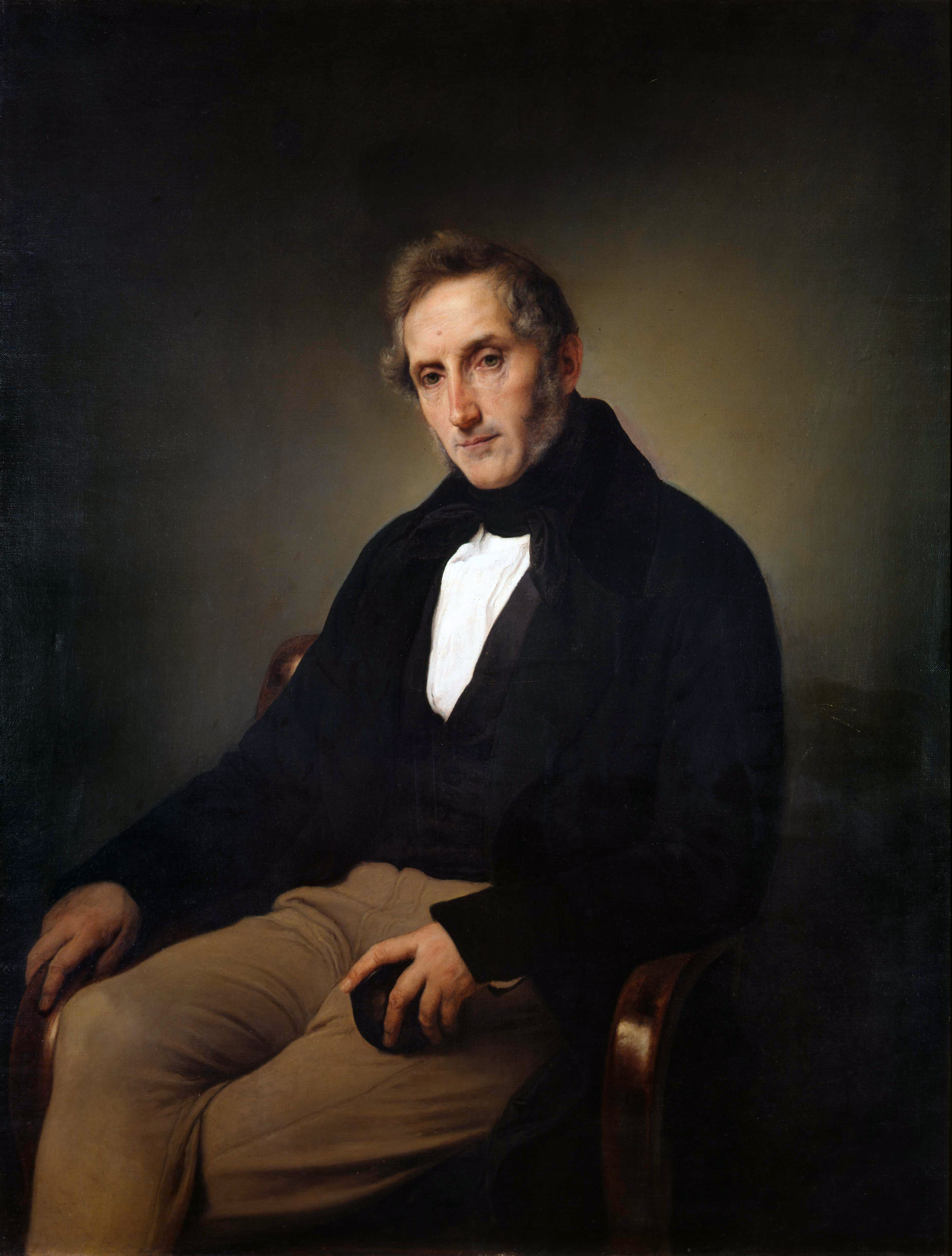
Alessandro Manzoni is famous for the novel The Betrothed (1827), ranked among the masterpieces of world literature. He contributed to the nationwide use of the Italian language.

The publication of Italian literature's first modern novel, I promessi sposi (The Betrothed) by Alessandro Manzoni, both reflected and furthered the growing trend towards Italian as a national standard language. Manzoni, a Milanesian, chose to write the book in the Florentine dialect, describing this choice, in the preface to his 1840 edition, as "rinsing" his Milanese "in the waters of the Arno" (Florence's river). The novel is commonly described as "the most widely read work in the Italian language". It became a model for subsequent Italian literary fiction, helping to galvanize national linguistic unity around the Florentine dialect.

This growth was initially relative; linguistic diversity continued during the unification of Italy (1848–1871). The Italian linguist Tullio De Mauro estimated that only 2.5% of Italy's population could speak the Italian standardized language properly in 1861, while Arrigo Castellani estimated the same value as 10%.

== Classification ==
Italian is a Romance language, a descendant of Vulgar Latin (colloquial spoken Latin). Standard Italian is based on Tuscan, especially its Florentine dialect, and is, therefore, an Italo-Dalmatian language, a classification that includes most other central and southern Italian languages and the extinct Dalmatian. As in most Romance languages, stress is distinctive in Italian.

According to Ethnologue, lexical similarity is 89% with French, 87% with Catalan, 85% with Sardinian, 82% with Spanish, 82% with Portuguese, 78% with Ladin, 77% with Romanian. Estimates may differ according to sources.

A 1949 study by the linguist Mario Pei concluded that out of seven Romance languages, Italian's stressed vowel phonology was the second-closest to that of Classical Latin (after Logudorese Sardinian). The study emphasized, however, that it represented only "a very elementary, incomplete and tentative demonstration" of how statistical methods could measure linguistic change, assigned "frankly arbitrary" point values to various types of change, and did not compare languages in the sample with respect to any characteristics or forms of divergence other than stressed vowels, among other caveats.

== Geographic distribution ==
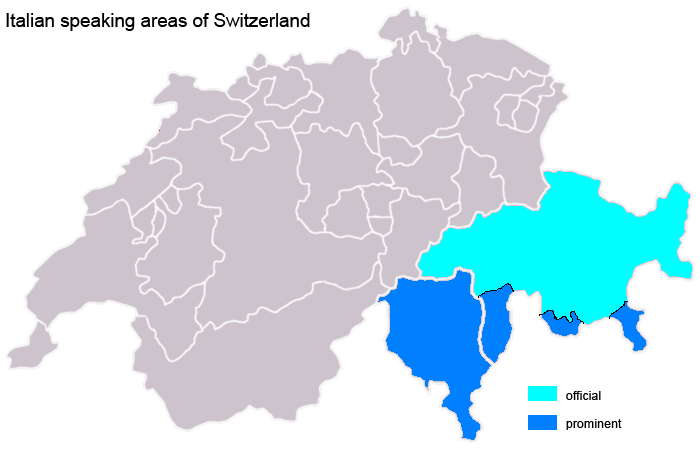
Italian language in Switzerland

Italian is the official language of Italy and San Marino and is spoken fluently by the majority of the countries' populations. Italian is the third most spoken language in Switzerland (after German and French; see Swiss Italian). It is official both on the national level and on regional level in two cantons: Ticino and Grisons. Ticino, which includes Lugano, the largest Italian-speaking city outside Italy, is the only canton where Italian is predominant. Italian is also used in administration and official documents in Vatican City.

Italian is also spoken by a minority in Monaco and France, especially in the southeastern part of the country. Italian was the official language in Savoy and in Nice until 1860, when they were both annexed by France under the Treaty of Turin, a development that triggered the "Niçard exodus", or the emigration of a quarter of the Niçard Italians to Italy, and the Niçard Vespers. Giuseppe Garibaldi complained about the referendum that allowed France to annex Savoy and Nice, and a group of his followers (among the Italian Savoyards) took refuge in Italy in the following years. Corsica passed from the Republic of Genoa to France in 1769 after the Treaty of Versailles. Italian was the official language of Corsica until 1859. Giuseppe Garibaldi called for the inclusion of the "Corsican Italians" within Italy when Rome was annexed to the Kingdom of Italy, but King Victor Emmanuel II did not agree to it. Italian is generally understood in Corsica by the population resident therein who speak Corsican, which is an Italo-Romance language similar to Tuscan. Francization occurred in Nice case, and caused a near-disappearance of the Italian language as many of the Italian speakers in these areas migrated to Italy. In Corsica, on the other hand, almost everyone still speaks the Corsican language, which, due to its linguistic proximity to the Italian standard language, appears both linguistically as an Italian dialect and therefore as a carrier of Italian culture, despite the French government's decades-long efforts to cut Corsica off from the Italian motherland. Italian was the official language in Monaco until 1860, when it was replaced by the French. This was due to the annexation of the surrounding County of Nice to France following the Treaty of Turin (1860).

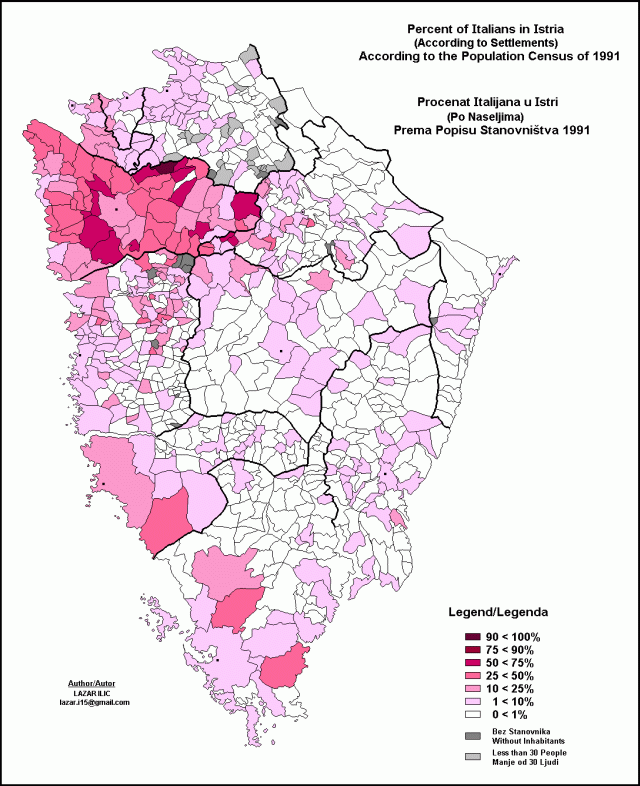
Percent of inhabitants with Italian native tongue in Croatia's and Slovenia's Istria

It formerly had official status in Montenegro (because of the Venetian Albania), parts of Slovenia and Croatia (because of the Venetian Istria and Venetian Dalmatia), parts of Greece (because of the Venetian rule in the Ionian Islands and by the Kingdom of Italy in the Dodecanese). Italian is widely spoken in Malta, where nearly two-thirds of the population can speak it fluently (see Maltese Italian). Italian served as Malta's official language until 1934, when it was abolished by the British colonial administration amid strong local opposition. Italian language in Slovenia is an officially recognised minority language in the country. The official census, carried out in 2002, reported 2,258 ethnic Italians (Istrian Italians) in Slovenia (0.11% of the total population). Italian language in Croatia is an official minority language in the country, with many schools and public announcements published in both languages. The 2001 census in Croatia reported 19,636 ethnic Italians (Istrian Italians and Dalmatian Italians) in the country (some 0.42% of the total population). Their numbers dropped dramatically after World War II following the Istrian–Dalmatian exodus, which caused the emigration of between 230,000 and 350,000 Istrian Italians and Dalmatian Italians. Italian was the official language of the Republic of Ragusa from 1492 to 1807.

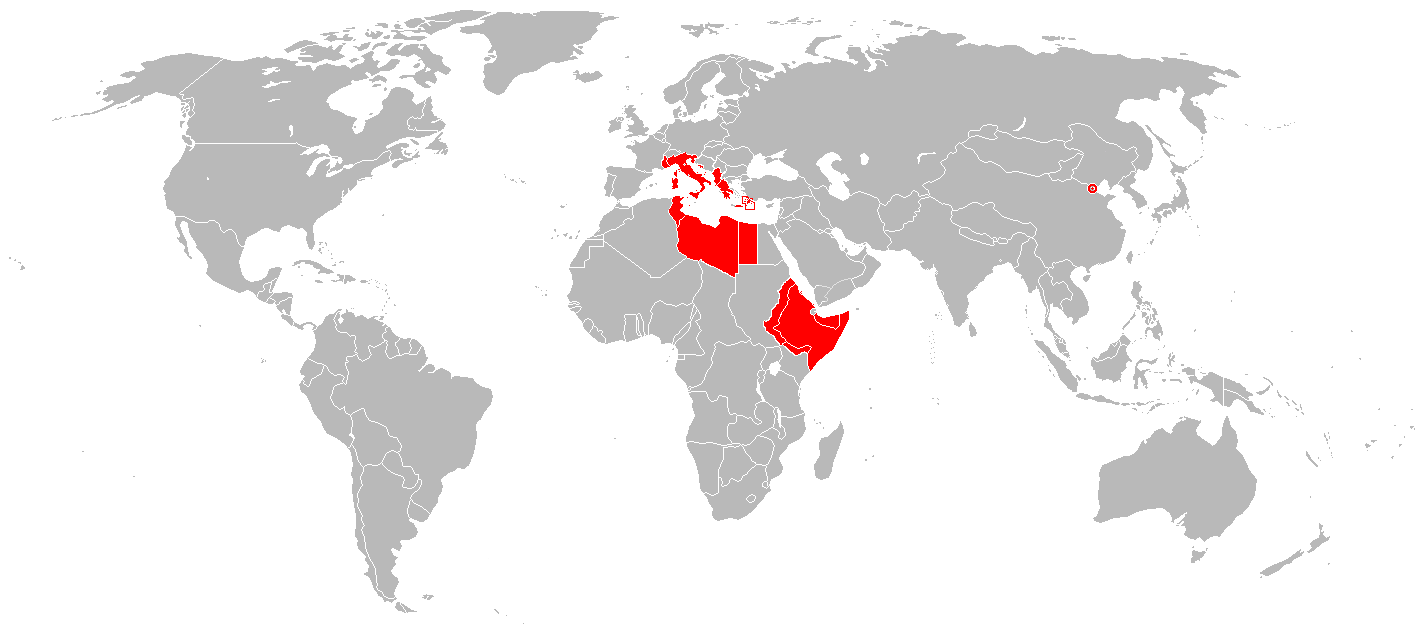
Italy and its colonial possessions during WW2

It formerly had official status in Albania due to the annexation of the country to the Kingdom of Italy (1939–1943). Albania has a large population of non-native speakers, with over half of the population having some knowledge of the Italian language. The Albanian government has pushed to make Italian a compulsory second language in schools. The Italian language is well-known and studied in Albania, due to its historical ties and geographical proximity to Italy and to the diffusion of Italian television in the country.

Due to heavy Italian influence during the Italian colonial period, Italian is still understood by some in former colonies such as Libya. Although it was the primary language in Libya since colonial rule, Italian greatly declined under the rule of Muammar Gaddafi, who expelled the Italian Libyan population and made Arabic the sole official language of the country. A few hundred Italian settlers returned to Libya in the 2000s.

Italian was the official language of Eritrea during Italian colonisation. Italian is today used in commerce, and it is still spoken especially among elders; besides that, Italian words are incorporated as loan words in the main language spoken in the country (Tigrinya). The capital city of Eritrea, Asmara, still has several Italian schools, established during the colonial period. In the early 19th century, Eritrea was the country with the highest number of Italians abroad, and the Italian Eritreans grew from 4,000 during World War I to nearly 100,000 at the beginning of World War II. In Asmara there are two Italian schools, the Istituto Italiano Statale Omnicomprensivo di Asmara (Italian primary school with a Montessori department) and the Liceo Sperimentale "G. Marconi" (Italian international senior high school).

Italian was also introduced to Somalia through colonialism and was the sole official language of administration and education during the colonial period but fell out of use after government, educational and economic infrastructure were destroyed in the Somali Civil War.

Italian language in the United States

Italian is also spoken by large immigrant and expatriate communities in the Americas and Australia. Although over 17 million Americans are of Italian descent, only a little over one million people in the United States speak Italian at home. Nevertheless, an Italian language media market does exist in the country. In Canada, Italian is the second most spoken non-official language when varieties of Chinese are not grouped together, with 375,645 claiming Italian as their mother tongue in 2016.

Italian immigrants to South America have also brought a presence of the language to that continent. According to some sources, Italian is the second most spoken language in Argentina after the official language of Spanish, although its number of speakers, mainly of the older generation, is decreasing. Italian bilingual speakers can be found scattered across the southeast of Brazil and in the south. In Venezuela, Italian is the most spoken language after Spanish and Portuguese, with around 200,000 speakers. In Uruguay, people who speak Italian as their home language are 1.1% of the total population of the country. In Australia, Italian is the second most spoken foreign language after Chinese, with 1.4% of the population speaking it as their home language.

The main Italian-language newspapers published outside Italy are the L'Osservatore Romano (Vatican City), the L'Informazione di San Marino (San Marino), the Corriere del Ticino and the laRegione Ticino (Switzerland), the La Voce del Popolo (Croatia), the Corriere d'Italia (Germany), the L'italoeuropeo (United Kingdom), the Passaparola (Luxembourg), the America Oggi (United States), the Corriere Canadese and the Corriere Italiano (Canada), the Il punto d'incontro (Mexico), the L'Italia del Popolo (Argentina), the Fanfulla (Brazil), the Gente d'Italia (Uruguay), the La Voce d'Italia (Venezuela), the Il Globo (Australia) and the La gazzetta del Sud Africa (South Africa).

=== Education ===
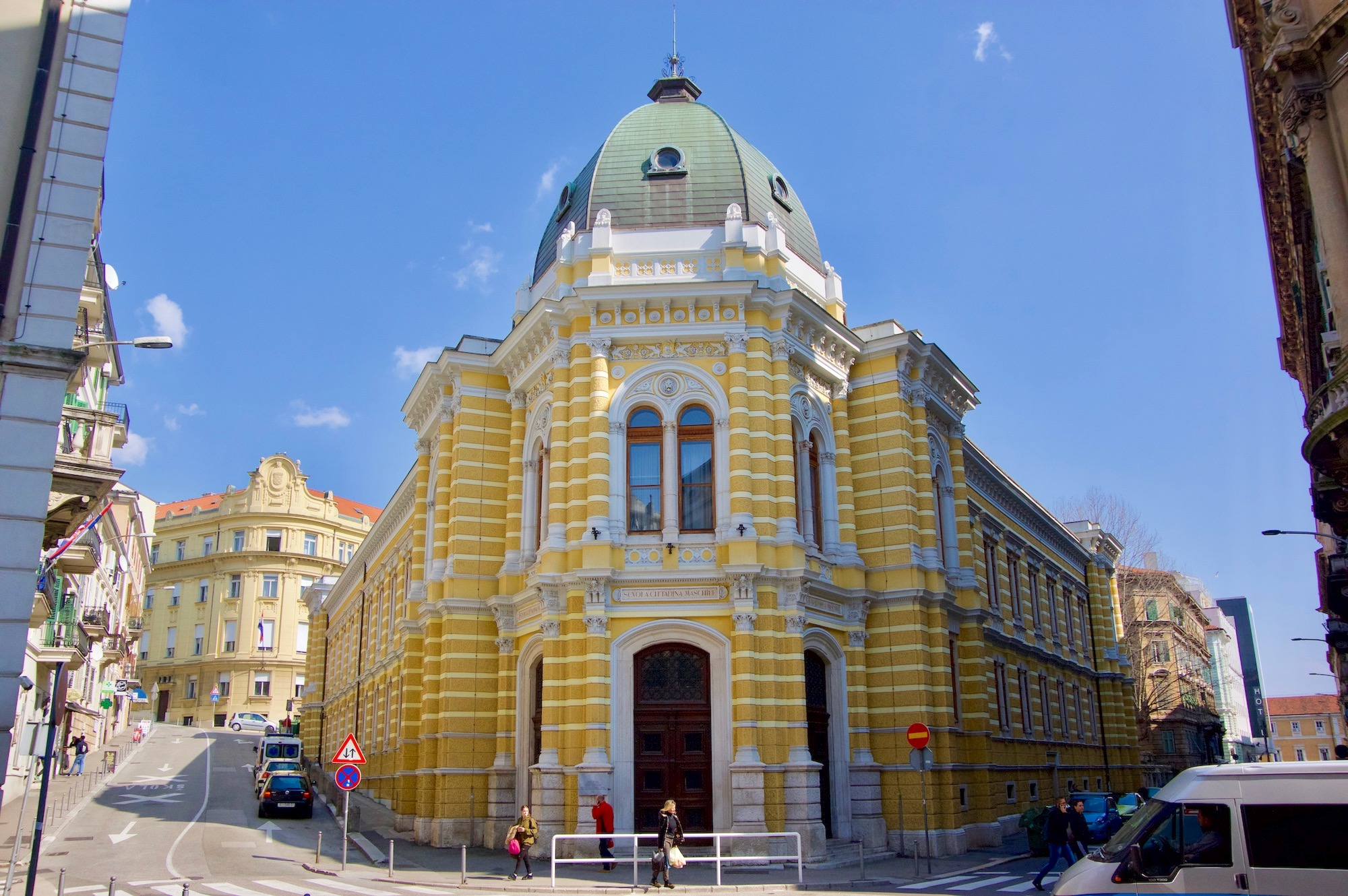
Italian Secondary School in Rijeka/Fiume, Croatia

Italian is widely taught in many schools around the world. In the 21st century, technology also allows for the continual spread of the Italian language, as people have new ways to learn how to speak, read, and write languages at their own pace and at any given time. For example, the free website and application Duolingo has 4.94 million English speakers learning the Italian language.

According to the Italian Ministry of Foreign Affairs, every year there are more than 200,000 foreign students who study the Italian language; they are distributed among the 90 Institutes of Italian Culture that are located around the world, in the 179 Italian schools located abroad, or in the 111 Italian lecturer sections belonging to foreign schools where Italian is taught as a language of culture.

As of 2022, Australia had the highest number of students learning Italian in the world. This occurred because of support by the Italian community in Australia and the Italian Government and also because of successful educational reform efforts led by local governments in Australia.

=== Influence and derived languages ===
Municipalities where Talian is co-official in Rio Grande do Sul, Brazil

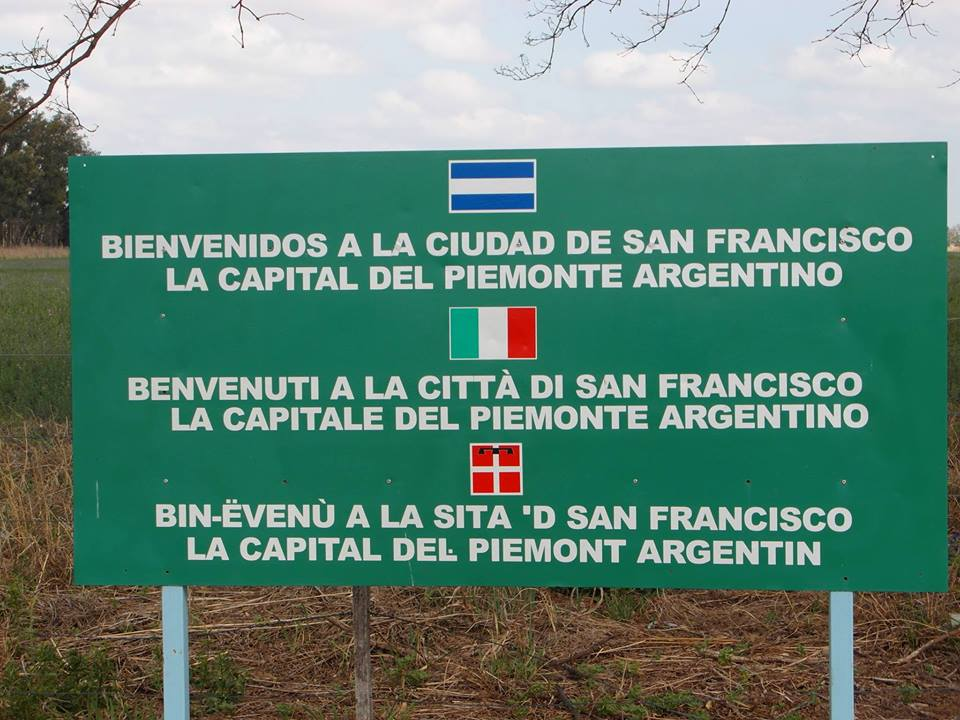
Trilingual sign in San Francisco, Argentina, in Spanish, Italian, and Piedmontese

From the late 19th to the mid-20th century, millions of Italians settled in Argentina, Uruguay, southern Brazil, and Venezuela, and in Canada and the United States, where they formed a physical and cultural presence.

In some cases, colonies were established where variants of regional languages of Italy were used, and some continue to use this regional language. Examples are Rio Grande do Sul, Brazil, where Talian is used, and the town of Chipilo near Puebla, Mexico; each continues to use a derived form of Venetian dating back to the 19th century. Other examples are Cocoliche, an Italian–Spanish pidgin once spoken in Argentina and especially in Buenos Aires, and Lunfardo. The Rioplatense Spanish dialect of Argentina and Uruguay today has thus been heavily influenced by both standard Italian and Italian regional languages as a result.

=== Lingua franca ===
Starting in late medieval times in much of Europe and the Mediterranean, Latin was replaced as the primary commercial language by languages of Italy, especially Tuscan and Venetian. These varieties were consolidated during the Renaissance with the strength of Italy and the rise of humanism and the arts.

Italy came to enjoy increasing artistic prestige within Europe. A mark of the educated gentlemen was to make the Grand Tour, visiting Italy to see its great historical monuments and works of art. It was expected that the visitor would learn at least some Italian, understood as language based on Florentine. In England, while the classical languages Latin and Greek were the first to be learned, Italian became the second most common modern language after French, a position it held until the late 18th century when it tended to be replaced by German. John Milton, for instance, wrote some of his early poetry in Italian.

Within the Catholic Church, Italian is known by a large part of the ecclesiastical hierarchy and is used in substitution for Latin in some official documents.

Italian loanwords continue to be used in most languages in matters of art and music (especially classical music including opera), in the design and fashion industries, in some sports such as football and especially in culinary terms.

== Languages and dialects ==
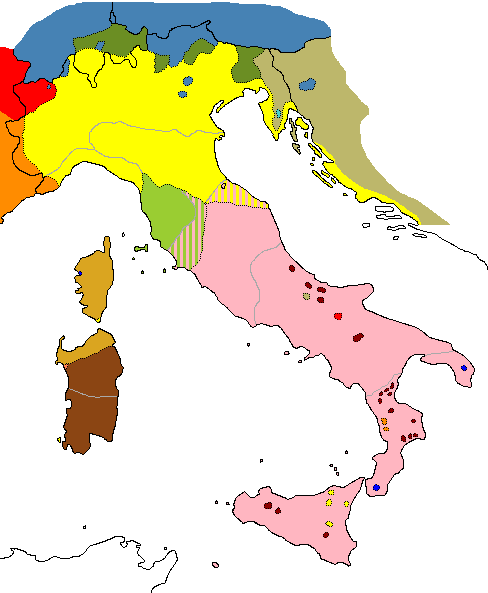
Linguistic map of Italy according to Clemente Merlo and Carlo Tagliavini (1937)

Italy's ethno-linguistic minorities

In Italy, almost all the other languages spoken as the vernacular—other than standard Italian and some languages spoken among immigrant communities—are often called "Italian dialects", a label that can be very misleading if it is understood to mean "dialects of Italian". The Romance dialects of Italy are local evolutions of spoken Latin that pre-date the establishment of Italian, and as such are sister languages to the Tuscan that was the historical source of Italian. They can be quite different from Italian and from each other, with some belonging to different linguistic branches of Romance. The only exceptions to this are twelve groups considered "historical language minorities", which are officially recognised as distinct minority languages by the law. On the other hand, Corsican (a language spoken on the French island of Corsica) is closely related to medieval Tuscan, from which standard Italian derives and evolved.

The differences in the evolution of Latin in the different regions of Italy can be attributed to the natural changes that all languages in regular use are subject to, and to some extent to the presence of three other types of languages: substrata, superstrata, and adstrata. The most prevalent were substrata (the language of the original inhabitants), as the Italian dialects were most probably simply Latin as spoken by native cultural groups. Superstrata and adstrata were both less important. Foreign conquerors of Italy that dominated different regions at different times left behind little to no influence on the dialects. Foreign cultures with which Italy engaged in peaceful relations with, such as trade, had no significant influence either.

Throughout Italy, regional varieties of standard Italian, called Regional Italian, are spoken. Regional differences can be recognised by various factors: the openness of vowels, the length of the consonants, and influence of the local language (for example, in informal situations andà, annà and nare replace the standard Italian andare in the area of Tuscany, Rome and Venice respectively for the infinitive 'to go').

There is no definitive date when the various Italian variants of Latin—including varieties that contributed to modern standard Italian—began to be distinct enough from Latin to be considered separate languages. One criterion for determining that two language variants are to be considered separate languages rather than variants of a single language is that they have evolved so that they are no longer mutually intelligible; this diagnostic is effective if mutual intelligibility is minimal or absent (e.g. in Romance, Romanian and Portuguese), but it fails in cases such as Spanish-Portuguese or Spanish-Italian, as educated native speakers of either pairing (particularly Spanish-Portuguese) can understand each other well if they choose to do so; however, the level of intelligibility is markedly lower between Italian-Spanish, and considerably higher between the Iberian sister languages of Portuguese-Spanish. Speakers of this latter pair can communicate with one another with remarkable ease, each speaking to the other in his own native language, without slang/jargon.

Nevertheless, on the basis of accumulated differences in morphology, syntax, phonology, and to some extent lexicon, it is not difficult to identify that for the Romance varieties of Italy, the first extant written evidence of languages that can no longer be considered Latin comes from the 9th and 10th centuries CE. These written sources demonstrate certain vernacular characteristics and sometimes explicitly mention the use of the vernacular in Italy.

Full literary manifestations of the vernacular began to surface around the 13th century in the form of various religious texts and poetry.Although these are the first written records of Italian varieties separate from Latin, the spoken language had probably diverged long before the first written records appeared since those who were literate generally wrote in Latin even if they spoke other Romance varieties in person.

Throughout the 19th and 20th centuries, the use of standard Italian became increasingly widespread and was mirrored by a decline in the use of the dialects. An increase in literacy was one of the main driving factors (one can assume that only literates were capable of learning standard Italian, whereas those who were illiterate had access only to their native dialect). The percentage of literates rose from 25% in 1861 to 60% in 1911, and then on to 78.1% in 1951. Tullio De Mauro, an Italian linguist, has asserted that in 1861, only 2.5% of the population of Italy could speak standard Italian. He reports that in 1951, that percentage had risen to 87%. The ability to speak Italian did not necessarily mean that it was in everyday use, and most people (63.5%) still usually spoke their native dialects. In addition, other factors such as mass emigration, industrialization, and urbanization, and internal migrations after World War II, contributed to the proliferation of standard Italian. The Italians who emigrated during the Italian diaspora beginning in 1861 were often of the uneducated lower class, and thus the emigration had the effect of increasing the percentage of literates, who often knew and understood the importance of standard Italian back home in Italy. A large percentage of those who had emigrated also eventually returned to Italy, often more educated than when they had left.

Although use of the Italian dialects has declined in the modern era, as Italy unified under standard Italian and continues to do so aided by mass media from newspapers to radio to television, diglossia is still frequently encountered in Italy and triglossia is not uncommon in emigrant communities among older speakers. Both situations normally involve some degree of code-switching and code-mixing.

== Phonology ==
Luke 2, 1–7 of the Bible being read by a speaker of Italian from Milan

Consonant phonemes
	Labial		Dental/ alveolar		Post- alveolar/ palatal		Velar	
Nasal		m		n		ɲ		
Stop	p	b	t	d			k	ɡ
Affricate			t͡s	d͡z	t͡ʃ	d͡ʒ		
Fricative	f	v	s	z	ʃ	(ʒ)		
Approximant						j		w
Lateral				l		ʎ		
Trill				r				

Notes:

- Between two vowels, or between a vowel and an approximant (/j, w/) or a liquid (/l, r/), consonants can be both singleton or geminate. Geminate consonants shorten the preceding vowel (or block phonetic lengthening) and the first element of the geminate is unreleased. For example, compare /fato/ [ˈfaːto] ('fate') with /fatto/ [ˈfat̚to] ('fact' or 'did'/'done'). However, /ɲ/, /ʃ/, /ʎ/, /d͡z/, /t͡s/ are always geminate intervocalically, including across word boundaries. Similarly, nasals, liquids, and sibilants are pronounced slightly longer in medial consonant clusters.
- /j/, /w/, and /z/ are the only consonants that cannot be geminated.
- /t, d/ are laminal denti-alveolar [t̪, d̪], commonly called "dental" for simplicity.
- /k, ɡ/ are pre-velar before /i, e, ɛ, j/.
- /t͡s, d͡z, s, z/ have two variants:
  - Dentalized laminal alveolar [t̪͡s̪, d̪͡z̪, s̪, z̪] (commonly called "dental" for simplicity), pronounced with the blade of the tongue very close to the upper front teeth, with the tip of the tongue resting behind lower front teeth.
  - Non-retracted apical alveolar [t͡s̺, d͡z̺, s̺, z̺]. The stop component of the "apical" affricates is actually laminal denti-alveolar.
- /n, l, r/ are apical alveolar [n̺, l̺, r̺] in most environments. /n, l/ are laminal denti-alveolar [n̪, l̪] before /t, d, t͡s, d͡z, s, z/ and palatalized laminal postalveolar [n̠ʲ, l̠ʲ] before /t͡ʃ, d͡ʒ, ʃ/. /n/ is velar [ŋ] before /k, ɡ/.
- /m/ and /n/ do not contrast before /p, b/ and /f, v/, where they are pronounced [m] and [ɱ], respectively.
- /ɲ/ and /ʎ/ are alveolo-palatal. In a large number of accents, /ʎ/ is a fricative [ʎ̝].
- Intervocalically, single /r/ is realised as a trill with one or two contacts. Some literature treats the single-contact trill as a tap [ɾ]. Single-contact trills can also occur elsewhere, particularly in unstressed syllables. Geminate /rr/ manifests as a trill with three to seven contacts.
- The phonemic distinction between /s/ and /z/ is neutralized before consonants and at the beginning of words: the former is used before voiceless consonants and before vowels at the beginning of words; the latter is used before voiced consonants. The two can contrast only between vowels within a word, e.g. fuso /ˈfuzo/ 'melted' versus fuso /ˈfuso/ 'spindle'. According to Canepari, although, the traditional standard has been replaced by a modern neutral pronunciation which always prefers /z/ when intervocalic, except when the intervocalic s is the initial sound of a word, if the compound is still felt as such: for example, presento /preˈsɛnto/ ('I foresee', with pre- meaning 'before' and sento meaning 'I perceive') vs presento /preˈzɛnto/ ('I present'). There are many words for which dictionaries now indicate that both pronunciations, either [z] or [s], are acceptable. Word-internally between vowels, the two phonemes have merged in many regional varieties of Italian, as either /z/ (northern-central) or /s/ (southern-central).

Italian has a seven-vowel system, consisting of /a, ɛ, e, i, ɔ, o, u/, and 23 consonants. Compared with most other Romance languages, Italian phonology is conservative, preserving many words nearly unchanged from Vulgar Latin. Some examples:

- Italian quattordici 'fourteen' < Latin quattuordecim (cf. Spanish catorce, French quatorze /katɔʁz/, Catalan and Portuguese catorze)
- Italian settimana 'week' < Latin septimāna (cf. Romanian săptămână, Spanish and Portuguese semana, French semaine /səmɛn/, Catalan setmana)
- Italian medesimo 'same' < Vulgar Latin *medi(p)simum (cf. Spanish mismo, Portuguese mesmo, French même /mɛm/, Catalan mateix; Italian usually prefers the shorter stesso)
- Italian guadagnare 'to win, earn, gain' < Vulgar Latin *guadaniāre < Germanic /waidanjan/ (cf. Spanish ganar, Portuguese ganhar, French gagner /ɡaɲe/, Catalan guanyar).

=== Evolution from Latin ===
The conservative nature of Italian phonology is partly explained by its origin. Italian stems from a literary language that is derived from the 13th-century speech of the city of Florence in the region of Tuscany, and has changed little in the last 700 years or so. Furthermore, the Tuscan dialect is the most conservative of all Italian dialects, radically different from the Gallo-Italian languages less than 160 kilometres (100 mi) to the north (across the La Spezia–Rimini Line).

The following are some of the conservative phonological features of Italian, as compared with the common Western Romance languages (French, Spanish, Portuguese, Galician, Catalan). Some of these features are also present in Romanian.

- Little or no phonemic lenition of consonants between vowels, e.g. vīta > vita 'life' (cf. Romanian viață, Spanish vida [ˈbiða], French vie), pedem > piede 'foot' (cf. Spanish pie, French pied /pje/).
  - Words that are an exception to this rule exist, such as: scvtella > scodella 'bowl', recipere > ricevere 'receive', lacvs > lago 'lake', acvs > ago 'needle', (only in the Tuscan accent and historical standard Italian) vīsus > viso /vizo/ 'face'.
- Preservation of geminate consonants, e.g. annum > /ˈanːo/ anno 'year' (cf. Spanish año /ˈaɲo/, French an /ɑ̃/, Romanian an, Portuguese ano /ˈɐnu/).
- Preservation of all Proto-Romance final vowels, e.g. pacem > pace 'peace' (cf. Romanian pace, Spanish paz, French paix /pɛ/), octō > otto 'eight' (cf. Romanian opt, Spanish ocho, French huit /ɥi(t)/), fēcī > feci 'I did' (cf. Romanian dialectal feci, Spanish hice, French fis /fi/).
- Preservation of most intertonic vowels (those between the stressed syllable and either the beginning or ending syllable). This accounts for some of the most noticeable differences, as in the forms quattordici and settimana given above.
- Slower consonant development, e.g. folia > Italo-Western /fɔʎʎa/ > foglia /ˈfɔʎʎa/ 'leaf' (cf. Romanian foaie /ˈfo̯aje/, Spanish hoja /ˈoxa/, French feuille /fœj/; but note Portuguese folha /ˈfoʎɐ/).

Compared with most other Romance languages, Italian has many inconsistent outcomes, where the same underlying sound produces different results in different words, e.g. laxāre > lasciare and lassare, captiāre > cacciare and cazzare, (ex)dēroteolāre > sdrucciolare, druzzolare and ruzzolare, rēgīna > regina and reina. Although in all these examples the second form has fallen out of usage, the dimorphism is thought to reflect the several-hundred-year period during which Italian developed as a literary language divorced from any native-speaking population, with an origin in 12th/13th-century Tuscan but with many words borrowed from languages farther to the north, with different sound outcomes. (The La Spezia–Rimini Line, the most important isogloss in the entire Romance-language area, passes only about 30 kilometres or 20 miles north of Florence). Dual outcomes of Latin /p t k/ between vowels, such as lŏcvm > luogo but fŏcvm > fuoco, was once thought to be due to borrowing of northern voiced forms, but is now generally viewed as the result of early phonetic variation within Tuscany.

Some other features that distinguish Italian from the Western Romance languages:

- Latin ce-,ci- becomes /tʃe, tʃi/ rather than /(t)se, (t)si/.
- Latin -ct- becomes /tt/ rather than /jt/ or /tʃ/: octō > otto 'eight' (cf. Spanish ocho, French huit, Portuguese oito).
- Vulgar Latin -cl- becomes cchi /kkj/ rather than /ʎ/: oclum > occhio 'eye' (cf. Portuguese olho /ˈoʎu/, French œil /œj/ < /œʎ/); but Romanian ochi /okʲ/.
- Final /s/ is not preserved, and vowel changes rather than /s/ are used to mark the plural: amico, amici 'male friend(s)', amica, amiche 'female friend(s)' (cf. Romanian amic, amici and amică, amice; Spanish amigo(s) 'male friend(s)', amiga(s) 'female friend(s)'); trēs, sex → tre, sei 'three, six' (cf. Romanian trei, șase; Spanish tres, seis).

Standard Italian also differs in some respects from most nearby Italian languages:

- Perhaps most noticeable is the total lack of metaphony, although metaphony is a feature characterizing nearly every other Italian language.
- No simplification of original /nd/, /mb/ (which often became /nn/, /mm/ elsewhere).

=== Assimilation ===
Italian phonotactics do not usually permit verbs and polysyllabic nouns to end with consonants, except in poetry and song, so foreign words may receive extra terminal vowel sounds.

== Writing system ==
An Italian handwriting script, taught in primary school

Italian has a shallow orthography, meaning very regular spelling with an almost one-to-one correspondence between letters and sounds. In linguistic terms, the writing system is close to being a phonemic orthography. The most important of the few exceptions are the following (see below for more details):

- The letter c represents the sound /k/ at the end of words and before the letters a, o, and u but represents the sound /tʃ/ (as the first sound in the English word chair) before the letters e and i.
- The letter g represents the sound /ɡ/ at the end of words and before the letters a, o, and u but represents the sound /dʒ/ (as the first sound in the English word gem) before the letters e and i.
- The letter n represents the phoneme /n/, which is pronounced [ŋ] (as in the English word sing) before the letters c and g when these represent velar plosives /k/ or /ɡ/, as in banco [ˈbaŋko], fungo [ˈfuŋɡo]. The letter q represents /k/ pronounced [k], thus n also represents [ŋ] in the position preceding it: cinque [ˈt͡ʃiŋkwe]. Elsewhere the letter n represents /n/ pronounced [n], including before the affricates /tʃ/ or /dʒ/ spelt with c or g before the letters i and e : mancia [ˈmant͡ʃa], mangia [ˈmand͡ʒa].
- The letter h is always silent: hotel /oˈtɛl/; hanno 'they have' and anno 'year' both represent /ˈanno/. It is used to form a digraph with c or g to represent /k/ or /ɡ/ before i or e: chi /ki/ 'who', che /ke/ 'what'; aghi /ˈaɡi/ 'needles', ghetto /ˈɡetto/.
- The spellings ci and gi before another vowel represent only /tʃ/ or /dʒ/ with no /i/ sound (ciuccio /ˈtʃuttʃo/ 'pacifier', Giorgio /ˈdʒordʒo/) unless c or g precede stressed /i/ (farmacia /farmaˈtʃi.a/ 'pharmacy', biologia /bioloˈdʒi.a/ 'biology'). Elsewhere ci and gi represent /tʃ/ and /dʒ/ followed by /i/: cibo /ˈtʃibo/ 'food', baci /ˈbatʃi/ 'kisses'; gita /ˈdʒita/ 'trip', Tamigi /taˈmidʒi/ 'Thames'.*

The Italian alphabet is typically considered to consist of 21 letters. The letters j, k, w, x, y are traditionally excluded, although they appear in loanwords such as jeans, whisky, taxi, and xilofono. The letter ⟨x⟩ has become common in standard Italian with the prefix extra-, although (e)stra- is traditionally used; it is also common to use the Latin particle ex(-) to mean 'former(ly)' as in la mia ex ('my ex-girlfriend'), "Ex-Jugoslavia" ('Former Yugoslavia'). The letter ⟨j⟩ appears in the first name Jacopo and in some Italian place-names, such as Bajardo, Bojano, Joppolo, Jerzu, Jesolo, Jesi, Ajaccio, among others, and in Mar Jonio, an alternative spelling of Mar Ionio (the Ionian Sea). The letter ⟨j⟩ may appear in dialectal words, but its use is discouraged in contemporary standard Italian. Letters used in foreign words can be replaced with phonetically equivalent native Italian letters and digraphs: ⟨gi⟩, ⟨ge⟩, or ⟨i⟩ for ⟨j⟩; ⟨c⟩ or ⟨ch⟩ for ⟨k⟩ (including in the standard prefix kilo-); ⟨o⟩, ⟨u⟩ or ⟨v⟩ for ⟨w⟩; ⟨s⟩, ⟨ss⟩, ⟨z⟩, ⟨zz⟩ or ⟨cs⟩ for ⟨x⟩; and ⟨e⟩ or ⟨i⟩ for ⟨y⟩.

- The acute accent is used over word-final ⟨e⟩ to indicate a stressed front close-mid vowel, as in perché 'why, because'. In dictionaries, it is also used over ⟨o⟩ to indicate a stressed back close-mid vowel (azióne). The grave accent is used over word-final ⟨e⟩ and ⟨o⟩ to indicate a front open-mid vowel and a back open-mid vowel respectively, as in tè 'tea', and può '(he) can'. The grave accent is used over any vowel to indicate word-final stress, as in gioventù 'youth'. Unlike ⟨é⟩, which is a close-mid vowel, a stressed final ⟨o⟩ is almost always a back open-mid vowel (andrò), with a few exceptions, such as metró, with a stressed final back close-mid vowel, making ⟨ó⟩ for the most part unnecessary outside of dictionaries. Most of the time, the penultimate syllable is stressed. But if the stressed vowel is the final letter of the word, the accent is mandatory, otherwise, it is virtually always omitted. Exceptions are typically either in dictionaries, where all or most stressed vowels are commonly marked. Accents can optionally be used to disambiguate words that differ only by stress, as for prìncipi 'princes' and princìpi 'principles', or àncora 'anchor' and ancóra 'still/yet'. For monosyllabic words, the rule is different: when two orthographically identical monosyllabic words with different meanings exist, one is accented and the other is not (example: è 'is', e 'and').
- The letter ⟨h⟩ distinguishes ho, hai, ha, hanno (present indicative of avere 'to have') from o ('or'), ai ('to the'), a ('to'), anno ('year'). In the spoken language, the letter is always silent. The ⟨h⟩ in ho additionally marks the contrasting open pronunciation of the ⟨o⟩. The letter ⟨h⟩ is also used in combinations with other letters. No phoneme /h/ exists in Italian. In nativized foreign words, the ⟨h⟩ is silent. For example, hotel and hovercraft are pronounced /oˈtɛl/ and /ˈɔverkraft/ respectively. (Where ⟨h⟩ existed in Latin, it either disappeared or, in a few cases before a back vowel, changed to [ɡ]: traggo 'I pull' ← Lat. trahō.)
- The letters ⟨s⟩ and ⟨z⟩ can symbolize voiced or voiceless consonants. ⟨z⟩ symbolizes /dz/ or /ts/ depending on context, with few minimal pairs. For example: zanzara /dzanˈdzara/ 'mosquito' and nazione /natˈtsjone/ 'nation'. ⟨s⟩ symbolizes /s/ word-initially before a vowel, when clustered with a voiceless consonant (⟨p, f, c, ch⟩), and when doubled; it symbolizes /z/ when between vowels and when clustered with voiced consonants. Intervocalic ⟨s⟩ varies regionally between /s/ and /z/, with /z/ being more dominant in northern Italy and /s/ in the south.
- The letters ⟨c⟩ and ⟨g⟩ vary in pronunciation between plosives and affricates depending on following vowels. The letter ⟨c⟩ symbolizes /k/ when word-final and before the back vowels ⟨a, o, u⟩. It symbolizes /tʃ/ as in chair before the front vowels ⟨e, i⟩. The letter ⟨g⟩ symbolizes /ɡ/ when word-final and before the back vowels ⟨a, o, u⟩. It symbolizes /dʒ/ as in gem before the front vowels ⟨e, i⟩. Other Romance languages and, to an extent, English have similar variations for ⟨c, g⟩. Compare hard and soft C, hard and soft G. (See also palatalization.)
- The digraphs ⟨ch⟩ and ⟨gh⟩ indicate (/k/ and /ɡ/) before ⟨i, e⟩. The digraphs ⟨ci⟩ and ⟨gi⟩ indicate 'softness' (/tʃ/ and /dʒ/, the affricate consonants of English church and judge) before ⟨a, o, u⟩. For example:

	Before back vowel (A, O, U)		Before front vowel (I, E)	
Plosive	C	caramella /karaˈmɛlla/ candy	CH	china /ˈkina/ India ink
Plosive	G	gallo /ˈɡallo/ rooster	GH	ghiro /ˈɡiro/ edible dormouse
Affricate	CI	ciambella /tʃamˈbɛlla/ donut	C	Cina /ˈtʃina/ China
Affricate	GI	giallo /ˈdʒallo/ yellow	G	giro /ˈdʒiro/ round, tour

Note: ⟨h⟩ is silent in the digraphs ⟨ch⟩, ⟨gh⟩; and ⟨i⟩ is silent in the digraphs ⟨ci⟩ and ⟨gi⟩ before ⟨a, o, u⟩ unless the ⟨i⟩ is stressed. For example, it is silent in ciao /ˈtʃa.o/ and cielo /ˈtʃɛ.lo/, but it is pronounced in farmacia /ˌfar.maˈtʃi.a/ and farmacie /ˌfar.maˈtʃi.e/.

Italian has geminate, or double, consonants, which are distinguished by length and intensity. Length is distinctive for all consonants except for /ʃ/, /dz/, /ts/, /ʎ/, /ɲ/, which are always geminate when between vowels, and /z/, which is always single. Geminate plosives and affricates are realized as lengthened closures. Geminate fricatives, nasals, and /l/ are realized as lengthened continuants. There is only one vibrant phoneme /r/ but the actual pronunciation depends on the context and regional accent. Generally one can find a flap consonant [ɾ] in an unstressed position whereas [r] is more common in stressed syllables, but there may be exceptions. Especially people from the northern part of Italy (Parma, Aosta Valley, South Tyrol) may pronounce /r/ as [ʀ], [ʁ], or [ʋ].

Of special interest to the linguistic study of Regional Italian is the gorgia toscana, or "Tuscan throat", the weakening or lenition of intervocalic /p/, /t/, and /k/ in the Tuscan language.

The voiced postalveolar fricative /ʒ/ is present as a phoneme only in loanwords: for example, garage [ɡaˈraːʒ]. Phonetic [ʒ] is common in central and southern Italy as an intervocalic allophone of /dʒ/: gente [ˈdʒɛnte] 'people' but la gente [laˈʒɛnte] 'the people', ragione [raˈʒoːne] 'reason'.

== Grammar ==
Italian grammar is typical of the grammar of Romance languages in general. Cases exist for personal pronouns (nominative, oblique, accusative, dative), but not for nouns.

There are two basic classes of nouns in Italian, referred to as genders, masculine and feminine. Gender may be natural (ragazzo 'boy', ragazza 'girl') or simply grammatical with no possible reference to biological gender (masculine costo 'cost', feminine costa 'coast'). Masculine nouns typically end in -o (ragazzo 'boy'), with plural marked by -i (ragazzi 'boys'), and feminine nouns typically end in -a, with plural marked by -e (ragazza 'girl', ragazze 'girls'). For a group composed of boys and girls, ragazzi is the plural, suggesting that -i is a general neutral plural. A third category of nouns is unmarked for gender, ending in -e in the singular and -i in the plural: legge 'law, f. sg.', leggi 'laws, f. pl.'; fiume 'river, m. sg.', fiumi 'rivers, m. pl.', thus assignment of gender is arbitrary in terms of form, enough so that terms may be identical but of distinct genders: fine meaning 'aim', 'purpose' is masculine, while fine meaning 'end, ending' (e.g. of a movie) is feminine, and both are fini in the plural, a clear instance of -i as a non-gendered default plural marker. These nouns often, but not always, denote inanimates. There are a number of nouns that have a masculine singular and a feminine plural, most commonly of the pattern m. sg. -o, f. pl. -a (miglio 'mile, m. sg.', miglia 'miles, f. pl.'; paio 'pair, m. sg.', paia 'pairs, f. pl.'), and thus are sometimes considered neuter (these are usually derived from neuter Latin nouns). An instance of neuter gender also exists in pronouns of the third person singular.

Examples:

Definition	Gender	Singular Form	Plural Form
Son	Masculine	Figlio	Figli
House	Feminine	Casa	Case
Love	Masculine	Amore	Amori
Art	Feminine	Arte	Arti

Nouns, adjectives, and articles inflect for gender and number (singular and plural).

Like in English, common nouns are capitalized when occurring at the beginning of a sentence. Unlike English, nouns referring to languages (e.g. Italian) and adjectives pertaining to ethnicity are never capitalized, while speakers of languages, or inhabitants of an area (e.g. Italians) used to always be capitalized, but, starting from the 19th century, this convention has been subject to various changes.

There are three types of adjectives: descriptive, invariable and form-changing. Descriptive adjectives are the most common, and their endings change to match the number and gender of the noun they modify. Invariable adjectives are adjectives whose endings do not change. The form-changing adjectives buono 'good', bello 'beautiful', grande 'big', and santo 'saint/holy' change in form when placed before different types of nouns. Italian has three degrees for comparison of adjectives: positive, comparative, and superlative.

The order of words in the phrase is relatively free compared to most European languages. The position of the verb in the phrase is highly mobile. Word order often has a lesser grammatical function in Italian than in English. Adjectives are sometimes placed before their noun and sometimes after. Subject nouns generally come before the verb. Italian is a null-subject language, so nominative pronouns are usually absent, with subject indicated by verbal inflections (e.g. amo 'I love', ama '(s)he loves', amano 'they love'). Noun objects normally come after the verb, as do pronoun objects after imperative verbs, infinitives and gerunds, but otherwise, pronoun objects come before the verb.

There are both indefinite and definite articles in Italian. There are four indefinite articles, selected by the gender of the noun they modify and by the phonological structure of the word that immediately follows the article. Uno is masculine singular, used before z (/ts/ or /dz/), s+consonant, gn (/ɲ/), pn or ps, while masculine singular un is used before a word beginning with any other sound. The noun zio 'uncle' selects masculine singular, thus uno zio 'an uncle' or uno zio anziano 'an old uncle,' but un mio zio 'an uncle of mine'. The feminine singular indefinite articles are una, used before any consonant sound, and its abbreviated form, written un', used before vowels: una camicia 'a shirt', una camicia bianca 'a white shirt', un'altra camicia 'a different shirt'. There are seven forms for definite articles, both singular and plural. In the singular: lo, which corresponds to the uses of uno; il, which corresponds to the uses with the consonant of un; la, which corresponds to the uses of una; l', used for both masculine and feminine singular before vowels. In the plural: gli is the masculine plural of lo and l'; i is the plural of il; and le is the plural of feminine la and l'.

There are numerous contractions of prepositions with subsequent articles. There are numerous productive suffixes for diminutive, augmentative, pejorative, attenuating, etc., which are also used to create neologisms.

There are 27 pronouns, grouped in clitic and tonic pronouns. Personal pronouns are separated into three groups: subject, object (which takes the place of both direct and indirect objects), and reflexive. Second-person subject pronouns have both a polite and a familiar form. These two different types of addresses are very important in Italian social distinctions. All object pronouns have two forms: stressed and unstressed (clitics). Unstressed object pronouns are much more frequently used, and come before a verb conjugated for subject-verb (la vedi: 'you see her'), after (in writing, attached to) non-conjugated verbs (vedendola: 'seeing her'). Stressed object pronouns come after the verb, and are used when the emphasis is required, for contrast, or to avoid ambiguity (vedo lui, ma non lei: 'I see him, but not her'). Aside from personal pronouns, Italian also has demonstrative, interrogative, possessive, and relative pronouns. There are two types of demonstrative pronouns: relatively near (this) and relatively far (that); there exists a third type of demonstrative denoting vicinity only to the listener, but it has fallen out of use. Demonstratives in Italian are repeated before each noun, unlike in English.

There are three regular sets of verbal conjugations, and various verbs are irregularly conjugated. Within each of these sets of conjugations, there are four simple (one-word) verbal conjugations by person/number in the indicative mood (present tense; past tense with imperfective aspect, past tense with perfective aspect, and future tense), two simple conjugations in the subjunctive mood (present tense and past tense), one simple conjugation in the conditional mood, and one simple conjugation in the imperative mood. Corresponding to each of the simple conjugations, there is a compound conjugation involving a simple conjugation of "to be" or "to have" followed by a past participle. "To have" is used to form compound conjugation when the verb is transitive (ha detto, ha fatto: 'he/she has said, he/she has made/done'), while "to be" is used in the case of verbs of motion and some other intransitive verbs (è andato, è stato: 'he has gone, he has been'). "To be" may be used with transitive verbs, but in such a case it makes the verb passive (è detto, è fatto: 'it is said, it is made/done'). This rule is not absolute, and some exceptions do exist.

== Words ==
=== Conversation ===
Note: the plural form of verbs could also be used as an extremely formal (for example to noble people in monarchies) singular form (see royal we).

English (inglese)	Italian (italiano)	Pronunciation
Yes	Sì	(listen) /ˈsi/
No	No	(listen) /ˈnɔ/
Of course!	Certo! / Certamente! / Naturalmente!	/ˈtʃɛrto/ /ˌtʃertaˈmente/ /naturalˈmente/
Hello!	Ciao! (informal) / Salve! (semi-formal)	/ˈtʃao/
Cheers!	Salute!	/saˈlute/
How are you?	Come stai? (informal) / Come sta? (formal) / Come state? (plural) / Come va? (general, informal)	/ˌkomeˈstai/; /ˌkomeˈsta/ /ˌkome ˈstate/ /ˌkome va/
Good morning!	Buongiorno! (= Good day!)	/ˌbwɔnˈdʒorno/
Good evening!	Buonasera!	/ˌbwɔnaˈsera/
Good night!	Buonanotte! (for a good night sleeping) / Buona serata! (for a good night awake)	/ˌbwɔnaˈnɔtte/ /ˌbwɔna seˈrata/
Have a nice day!	Buona giornata! (formal)	/ˌbwɔna dʒorˈnata/
Enjoy the meal!	Buon appetito!	/ˌbwɔn‿appeˈtito/
Goodbye!	Arrivederci (general) / Arrivederla (formal) / Ciao! (informal)	(listen) /arriveˈdertʃi/
Good luck!	Buona fortuna! (general)	/ˌbwɔna forˈtuna/
I love you	Ti amo (between lovers only) / Ti voglio bene (in the sense of "I am fond of you", between lovers, friends, relatives etc.)	/ti ˈamo/; /ti ˌvɔʎʎo ˈbɛne/
Welcome [to...]	Benvenuto/-i (for male/males or mixed) / Benvenuta/-e (for female/females) [a / in...]	/benveˈnuto//benveˈnuti//benveˈnuta/ /benveˈnute/
Please	Per favore / Per piacere / Per cortesia	(listen) /per faˈvore/ /per pjaˈtʃere/ /per korteˈzia/
Thank you!	Grazie! (general) / Ti ringrazio! (informal) / La ringrazio! (formal) / Vi ringrazio! (plural)	/ˈɡrattsje/ /ti rinˈɡrattsjo/
You are welcome!	Prego!	/ˈprɛɡo/
Excuse me / I am sorry	Mi dispiace (only "I am sorry") / Scusa(mi) (informal) / Mi scusi (formal) / Scusatemi (plural) / Sono desolato ("I am sorry", if male) / Sono desolata ("I am sorry", if female)	/ˈskuzi/; /ˈskuza/; /mi disˈpjatʃe/
Who?	Chi?	/ki/
What?	Che cosa? / Cosa? / Che?	/kekˈkɔza/ or /kekˈkɔsa/ /ˈkɔza/ or /kɔsa/ /ˈke/
When?	Quando?	/ˈkwando/
Where?	Dove?	/ˈdove/
How?	Come?	/ˈkome/
Why / Because	Perché	/perˈke/
Again	Di nuovo / Ancora	/di ˈnwɔvo/; /anˈkora/
How much? / How many?	Quanto? / Quanta? / Quanti? / Quante?	/ˈkwanto/
What is your name?	Come ti chiami? (informal) / Qual è il suo nome? (formal) / Come si chiama? (formal)	/ˌkome tiˈkjami/ /kwal ˈɛ il ˌsu.o ˈnome/
My name is...	Mi chiamo...	/mi ˈkjamo/
This is...	Questo è... (masculine) / Questa è... (feminine)	/ˌkwesto ˈɛ/ /ˌkwesta ˈɛ/
Yes, I understand.	Sì, capisco. / Ho capito.	/si kaˈpisko/ /ɔkkaˈpito/
I do not understand.	Non capisco. / Non ho capito.	(listen) /non kaˈpisko/ /nonˌɔkkaˈpito/
Do you speak English?	Parli inglese? (informal) / Parla inglese? (formal) / Parlate inglese? (plural)	(listen) /parˌlate inˈɡleːse/ (listen) /ˌparla inˈɡlese/
I do not understand Italian.	Non capisco l'italiano.	/non kaˌpisko litaˈljano/
Help me!	Aiutami! (informal) / Mi aiuti! (formal) / Aiutatemi! (plural) / Aiuto! (general)	/aˈjutami/ /ajuˈtatemi/ /aˈjuto/
You are right/wrong!	(Tu) hai ragione/torto! (informal) / (Lei) ha ragione/torto! (formal) / (Voi) avete ragione/torto! (plural)	
What time is it?	Che ora è? / Che ore sono?	/ke ˌora ˈɛ/ /ke ˌore ˈsono/
Where is the bathroom?	Dov'è il bagno?	(listen) /doˌvɛ il ˈbaɲɲo/
How much is it?	Quanto costa?	/ˌkwanto ˈkɔsta/
The bill, please.	Il conto, per favore.	/il ˌkonto per faˈvore/
The study of Italian sharpens the mind.	Lo studio dell'italiano aguzza l'ingegno.	/loˈstudjo dellitaˈljano aˈɡuttsa linˈdʒeɲɲo/
Where are you from?	Di dove sei? (general, informal)/ Di dove è? (formal)	/di dove ssˈɛi/ /di dove ˈɛ/
I like	Mi piace (for one object) / Mi piacciono (for multiple objects)	/mi pjatʃe/ /mi pjattʃono/

=== Question words ===
English	Italian	IPA
what (adj.)	che	/ke/
what (standalone)	cosa	/ˈkɔza/, /ˈkɔsa/
who	chi	/ki/
how	come	/ˈkome/
where	dove	/ˈdove/
why, because	perché	/perˈke/
which	quale	/ˈkwale/
when	quando	/ˈkwando/
how much	quanto	/ˈkwanto/

=== Time ===
English	Italian	IPA
today	oggi	/ˈɔddʒi/
yesterday	ieri	/ˈjɛri/
tomorrow	domani	/doˈmani/
second	secondo	/seˈkondo/
minute	minuto	/miˈnuto/
hour	ora	/ˈora/
day	giorno	/ˈdʒorno/
week	settimana	/settiˈmana/
month	mese	/ˈmeze/, /ˈmese/
year	anno	/ˈanno/

=== Numbers ===
English	Italian	IPA
one	uno	/ˈuno/
two	due	/ˈdue/
three	tre	/ˈtre/
four	quattro	/ˈkwattro/
five	cinque	/ˈtʃinkwe/
six	sei	/ˈsɛi/
seven	sette	/ˈsɛtte/
eight	otto	/ˈɔtto/
nine	nove	/ˈnɔve/
ten	dieci	/ˈdjɛtʃi/

English	Italian	IPA
eleven	undici	/ˈunditʃi/
twelve	dodici	/ˈdoditʃi/
thirteen	tredici	/ˈtreditʃi/
fourteen	quattordici	/kwatˈtorditʃi/
fifteen	quindici	/ˈkwinditʃi/
sixteen	sedici	/ˈseditʃi/
seventeen	diciassette	/ditʃasˈsɛtte/
eighteen	diciotto	/diˈtʃɔtto/
nineteen	diciannove	/ditʃanˈnɔve/
twenty	venti	/ˈventi/

English	Italian	IPA
twenty-one	ventuno	/venˈtuno/
twenty-two	ventidue	/ˌventiˈdue/
twenty-three	ventitré	/ˌventiˈtre/
twenty-four	ventiquattro	/ˌventiˈkwattro/
twenty-five	venticinque	/ˌventiˈtʃinkwe/
twenty-six	ventisei	/ˌventiˈsɛi/
twenty-seven	ventisette	/ˌventiˈsɛtte/
twenty-eight	ventotto	/venˈtɔtto/
twenty-nine	ventinove	/ˌventiˈnɔve/
thirty	trenta	/ˈtrenta/

English	Italian	IPA
one hundred	cento	/ˈtʃɛnto/
one thousand	mille	/ˈmille/
two thousand	duemila	/ˌdueˈmila/
two thousand (and) twenty-five (2025)	duemilaventicinque	/dueˌmilaˈventitʃinkwe/
one million	un milione	/miˈljone/
one billion	un miliardo	/miˈljardo/
one trillion	mille miliardi	/ˈmilleˈmiˈljardi/

=== Days of the week ===
English	Italian	IPA
Monday	lunedì	/luneˈdi/
Tuesday	martedì	/marteˈdi/
Wednesday	mercoledì	/ˌmerkoleˈdi/
Thursday	giovedì	/dʒoveˈdi/
Friday	venerdì	/venerˈdi/
Saturday	sabato	/ˈsabato/
Sunday	domenica	/doˈmenika/

=== Months of the year ===
English	Italian	IPA
January	gennaio	/dʒenˈnajo/
February	febbraio	/febˈbrajo/
March	marzo	/ˈmartso/
April	aprile	/aˈprile/
May	maggio	/ˈmaddʒo/
June	giugno	/ˈdʒuɲɲo/
July	luglio	/ˈluʎʎo/
August	agosto	/aˈɡosto/
September	settembre	/setˈtɛmbre/
October	ottobre	/otˈtobre/
November	novembre	/noˈvɛmbre/
December	dicembre	/diˈtʃɛmbre/

== Example text ==
Italian pronunciation

Article 1 of the Universal Declaration of Human Rights in Italian:

Tutti gli esseri umani nascono liberi ed eguali in dignità e diritti. Essi sono dotati di ragione e di coscienza e devono agire gli uni verso gli altri in spirito di fratellanza.

Article 1 of the Universal Declaration of Human Rights in English:

All human beings are born free and equal in dignity and rights. They are endowed with reason and conscience and should act towards one another in a spirit of brotherhood.

International Phonetic Alphabet transcription:

[ˈtut.ti‿ʎ.ʎ‿ˈɛs.seri̯‿uˈmaːni ˈnaskono ˈliːberi e.d‿eˈgwaːli̯‿in diɲ.ɲiˈta e‿diˈrit.ti ‖ ˈɛs.si ˈsoːno doˈtaːti di raˈd͡ʒoːn‿e‿di koʃˈʃɛnt͡sa e‿ˈdɛːvono aˈd͡ʒiːre‿ʎ.ʎ‿ˈuːni ˈvɛr.so‿ʎ.ʎ‿ˈaltri̯‿in ˈspiːrito di fratelˈlant͡sa ‖]

== Nobel Prizes for Italian language literature ==
Swiss Nobel laureates
Year	Image	Laureate	Born	Died	Field	Rationale
1906	Portrait of Giosuè Carducci	Giosuè Carducci	27 July 1835 in Valdicastello	16 February 1907 in Bologna	Literature	"not only in consideration of his deep learning and critical research, but above all as a tribute to the creative energy, freshness of style, and lyrical force which characterize his poetic masterpieces"
1926	Portrait of Grazia Deledda	Grazia Deledda	27 September 1871 in Nuoro (Sardinia)	15 August 1936 in Rome	Literature	"for her idealistically inspired writings which with plastic clarity picture the life on her native island and with depth and sympathy deal with human problems in general"
1934	Portrait of Luigi Pirandello	Luigi Pirandello	28 June 1867 in Agrigento	10 December 1936 in Rome	Literature	"for his bold and ingenious revival of dramatic and scenic art"
1959	Portrait of Salvatore Quasimodo	Salvatore Quasimodo	20 August 1901 in Modica	14 June 1968 in Naples	Literature	"for his lyrical poetry, which with classical fire expresses the tragic experience of life in our own times"
1975	Portrait of Eugenio Montale	Eugenio Montale	12 October 1896 in Genoa	12 September 1981 in Milan	Literature	"for his distinctive poetry which, with great artistic sensitivity, has interpreted human values under the sign of an outlook on life with no illusions"
1997	Portrait of Dario Fo	Dario Fo	24 March 1926 in Leggiuno-Sangiano	13 October 2016 in Milan	Literature	"who emulates the jesters of the Middle Ages in scourging authority and upholding the dignity of the downtrodden"

== See also ==
- Languages of Italy (includes "Italian dialects", dialetti)
- CELI
- CILS (Qualification)
- Italian alphabet
- Regional Italian
- Italian grammar
- Italian honorifics
- List of countries and territories where Italian is an official language
- The Italian Language Foundation (in the United States)
- Italian language in Brazil
- Italian language in Croatia
- Italian language in Slovenia
- Italian language in the United States
- Italian language in Venezuela
- Italian literature
- Italian musical terms
- Italian phonology
- Italian profanity
- Italian Sign Language
- Italian Studies
- Italian-language international radio stations
- Lessico etimologico italiano
- Sicilian School
- Veronese Riddle
- Languages of the Vatican City
- Talian
- List of English words of Italian origin
- List of Italian musical terms used in English

== Bibliography ==
- Ashby, Patricia (2011), Understanding Phonetics, Understanding Language series, Routledge, ISBN 978-0340928271
- Bertinetto, Pier Marco; Loporcaro, Michele (2005). "The sound pattern of Standard Italian, as compared with the varieties spoken in Florence, Milan and Rome". Journal of the International Phonetic Association. 35 (2): 131–151. doi:10.1017/S0025100305002148. S2CID 6479830.
- Canepari, Luciano (1992), Il MªPi – Manuale di pronuncia italiana [Handbook of Italian Pronunciation] (in Italian), Bologna: Zanichelli, ISBN 978-88-08-24624-0
- Berloco, Fabrizio (2018). The Big Book of Italian Verbs: 900 Fully Conjugated Verbs in All Tenses. With IPA Transcription, 2nd Edition. Lengu. ISBN 978-8894034813. Archived from the original on 27 April 2024.
- Palermo, Massimo (2015). Linguistica italiana. Il Mulino. ISBN 978-8815258847.
- Simone, Raffaele (2010). Enciclopedia dell'italiano. Treccani.
- Hall, Robert A. Jr. (1944). "Italian phonemes and orthography". Italica. 21 (2). American Association of Teachers of Italian: 72–82. doi:10.2307/475860. JSTOR 475860.
- Ladefoged, Peter; Maddieson, Ian (1996). The Sounds of the World's Languages. Oxford: Blackwell. ISBN 0-631-19815-6.
- Prifti, Elton (2014). "Enèrgeia in trasformazione: elementi analitici di linguistica migrazionale". Zeitschrift für romanische Philologie. 130 (1): 1–22. doi:10.1515/zrp-2014-0001. S2CID 142121342.
- Recasens, Daniel (2013), "On the articulatory classification of (alveolo)palatal consonants" (PDF), Journal of the International Phonetic Association, 43 (1): 1–22, doi:10.1017/S0025100312000199, S2CID 145463946, archived from the original (PDF) on 6 May 2021
- Rogers, Derek; d'Arcangeli, Luciana (2004). "Italian". Journal of the International Phonetic Association. 34 (1): 117–121. doi:10.1017/S0025100304001628.
- M. Vitale, Studi di Storia della Lingua Italiana, LED Edizioni Universitarie, Milano, 1992, ISBN 88-7916-015-X
- S. Morgana, Capitoli di Storia Linguistica Italiana, LED Edizioni Universitarie, Milano, 2003, ISBN 88-7916-211-X
- J. Kinder, CLIC: Cultura e Lingua d'Italia in CD-ROM / Culture and Language of Italy on CD-ROM, Interlinea, Novara, 2008, ISBN 978-88-8212-637-7
- Treccani Italian Dictionary (iso) (in Italian). it – via archive.org. (with a similar list of other Italian-modern languages dictionaries)
