= List of English words of Italian origin =

This is a partial list of known or supposed Italian loanwords, or Italianisms, in English. A separate list of terms used in music can be found at List of Italian musical terms used in English:

== Music ==
- Acciaccatura
- Adagio
- Allegretto
- Allegro
- Alto
- Andante
- Appoggiatura
- Aria
- Arpeggio
- Assolo
- Ballerina and prima ballerina
- Baritone (from Italian baritono – from Greek βαρύτονος – through French)
- Bass (from Latin bassus, influenced by Italian basso)
- Basso
- Bel canto
- Biennale
- Bravo
- Bravura
- Brio
- Cadenza
- Cantata
- Castrato
- Celesta
- Cello (from Italian violoncello)
- Coda
- Coloratura
- Concert (from Italian concerto through French)
- Concertante
- Concerto
- Continuo
- Contralto
- Contrapuntal (Italian: contrappuntistico)
- Cornetto
- Crescendo
- Diminuendo
- Diva
- Duet (from Italian duetto through French)
- Duo
- Falsetto
- Fantasia
- Fermata
- Fiasco (in Italian, it can also mean 'flask, bottle')
- Finale
- Forte
- Fortissimo
- Glissando
- Impresario
- Intermezzo
- Largo
- Legato
- Librettist (Italian: librettista)
- Libretto
- Madrigal (Italian: madrigale)
- Maestro
- Mandolin (from Italian mandolino through French)
- Mezzo-soprano (in Italian without hyphen)
- Obbligato
- Oboe
- Ocarina
- Opera
- Operetta
- Oratorio
- Ostinato
- Pianissimo
- Piano
- Piccolo (in Italian means 'small')
- Pizzicato
- Prestissimo
- Presto
- Prima ballerina
- Prima donna
- Quartet (from Italian quartetto through French)
- Quintet (Italian: quintetto)
- Scherzo (in Italian means 'joke')
- Semibreve
- Sextet (Italian: sestetto)
- Sol-fa, solfa, solfeggio, solfège (the last one through French)
- Solo (in Italian means 'alone')
- Soloist (Italian: solista)
- Sonata
- Soprano
- Sotto voce (in Italian it literally means 'under the voice' i.e. 'in a low voice'; often written without spaces)
- Staccato
- Tarantella (after the city of Taranto)
- Tempo (in Italian means 'time')
- Timpani (Italian timpano, pl. timpani)
- Toccata
- Tremolo
- Trio
- Trombone
- Vibrato
- Viola
- Violin (from Italian violino through French)
- Violoncello
- Virtuoso

== Art and architecture ==
- Antics (from Italian antico, meaning 'old, ancient')
- Apartment (from Italian appartamento through French appartement)
- Arabesque (from Italian arabesco through French arabesque)
- Architrave
- Archivolt (Italian: archivolto)
- Balcony (from Italian balcone)
- Bas-relief (from Italian bassorilievo through French)
- Belvedere (in Italian means a view point)
- Bust (from Italian busto through French)
- Cameo (Italian: cameo or cammeo)
- Campanile
- Caricature (from Italian caricatura through French)
- Carton (from Italian cartone through French)
- Cartoon (from Italian cartone through French)
- Chiaroscuro (from chiaro-oscuro 'light-dark', an art technique making strong use of bold shadow and harsh lighting)
- Corridor (from Italian corridoio through French)
- Cupola
- Dado (in Italian meaning 'dice')
- Fresco (Italian: affresco from the expression a fresco)
- Gesso
- Graffiti (Italian: graffito, pl. graffiti)
- Grotto (in Italian grotta, meaning 'cave')
- Impasto
- Intaglio
- Loggia (from French loge)
- Madonna (in Medieval Italian meant Lady, in Modern Italian indicates Mary the Virgin)
- Magenta (after the Italian town)
- Mezzanine (Italian mezzanino, from mezzano 'middle')
- Modello (Italian modello 'model, sketch')
- Moresco
- Parapet (from Italian parapetto through French)
- Patina
- Patio
- Pergola
- Piazza
- Pietà (in Italian means 'pity')
- Portico
- Putto (Italian putto 'baby', 'cherub')
- Replica (in Italian means 'repeat performance')
- Sgraffito (Italian sgraffiare 'to scratch, write')
- Stucco (in Italian means 'plaster')
- Tempera
- Terra-cotta (in Italian without hyphen)
- Terrazza (in Italian means 'terrace', 'balcony')
- Torso
- Veranda
- Villa

== Literature and language ==
- Canto (from canto 'song', originally from Latin. A section of a long or epic poem)
- Ditto (Old Italian for 'said')
- Lingua franca (Italian lingua Franca, 'Frankish language', its usage to mean a common tongue originated from its meaning in Arabic and Greek during the Middle Ages, whereby all Western Europeans were called 'Franks' or Faranji in Arabic and Phrankoi in Greek)
- Motto (Italian motto 'word')
- Novel (Italian novella 'tale')
- Ottava rima
- Rodomontade (from Rodomonte, a character in Italian Renaissance epic poems Orlando innamorato and its sequel Orlando furioso)
- Sestina
- Sonnet (from Italian sonetto through French)
- Stanza

== Theatre and dramatic arts ==
- Buffoon (from Italian buffone "jester" via French)
- Cantastoria (from canta historia 'sung story' or 'singing history', a theatrical form, in modern Italian: cantastorie)
- Commedia dell'arte
- Extravaganza (in Italian stravaganza, meaning 'extravagance')
- Finale, Series finale
- Imbroglio (in Italian means 'cheat')
- Mask (from Italian maschera though Middle French masque, from Medieval Latin masca 'mask, specter, nightmare'.
- Punch (from the Italian character Pulcinella)
- Scenario (in Italian also meaning 'scenery')
- Sotto voce (Italian sottovoce 'in a low voice')

== Arts in general and aesthetics ==
- Burlesque (from Italian burlesco through French)
- Capriccio: From capriccio 'sudden motion'. In music, a free composition; in art, a juxtaposing of elements to create a fantastic or imagined architecture
- Cinquecento (Italian Cinquecento from millecinquecento '1500') The culture of the 16th century
- Grotesque (from Italian grottesco through French)
- Pastiche (from Italian pasticcio through French)
- Picturesque (from Italian pittoresco through French)
- Quattrocento (Italian Quattrocento from millequattrocento '1400') The culture of the 15th century
- Studio

== Colours ==
- Lava (color)
- Magenta
- Rosso corsa
- Sepia (from Italian seppia, meaning 'cuttlefish')
- Sienna (from Italian terra di Siena 'soil of Siena')
- Terra cotta (color)
- Umber (from Latin umbra 'shadow', and the region of its origin, Umbria)

== Cuisine ==
- Al dente
- Al fresco
- Antipasto
- Artichoke (from articiocco, Northern Italian variant of Old Italian arcicioffo)
- Baguette (through French baguette from Italian bacchetta)
- Banquet (from Italian banchetto through French)
- Barista (from barista 'bartender'. A preparer of espresso-based coffee)
- Bergamot (Italian: bergamotto)
- Biscuit (through French from Italian biscotto, meaning 'cooked twice')
- Bologna (after the Italian city)
- Bruschetta
- Broccoli (Italian: broccolo, pl. broccoli)
- Candy (from Middle English sugre candy, part translation of Middle French sucre candi, from Old French çucre candi, part translation of Italian zucchero candito, from zucchero sugar + Arabic قاندل qandI candied, from Persian قند qand cane sugar; ultimately from Sanskrit खुड् khanda 'piece of sugar', perhaps from Dravidian)
- Cannelloni (Italian: cannellone, pl. cannelloni)
- Cantaloupe (after the Italian village of Cantalupo in Sabina through French; in Italian the fruit is simply called melone or Cantalupo)
- Canteen (from Italian cantina "wine cellar, vault" via French)
- Cappuccino (from cappuccino 'little hood' or 'Capuchin'. A reference to the similarity between the drink's colour and that of the brown hoods of Capuchin friars)
- Cauliflower (originally cole florye, from Italian cavolfiore meaning 'flowered cabbage'
- Chianti
- Chipolata (from Italian cipolla, meaning 'onion')
- Ciabatta (whose Italian basic meaning is 'slipper')
- Coffee (from Italian caffè, from Turkish kahveh, and Arabic qahwah, perhaps from Kaffa region of Ethiopia, a home of the plant)
- Conchiglie
- Dolcelatte
- Espresso (from espresso 'expressed')
- Farfalle
- Fava
- Frascati
- Fusilli (Italian: fusillo, pl. fusilli; a derivative form of the word fuso, meaning 'spindle')
- Gelatine (from Italian gelatina through French)
- Gnocchi (Italian: gnocco, pl. gnocchi)
- Gorgonzola (after the village near Milan)
- Granita
- Grappa
- Grissini
- Gusto
- Lasagne (Italian: lasagna, pl. lasagne)
- Latte or caffè latte (Italian: caffellatte or caffè e latte 'coffee and milk')
- Latte macchiato (Italian latte macchiato 'stained milk')
- Macaroni (Italian maccherone, pl. maccheroni)
- Macchiato or "caffè macchiato" (from macchiato 'stained', espresso coffee with a small dash of milk)
- Maraschino
- Marinate (Italian: marinare)
- Marzipan (through German from Italian marzapane)
- Martini cocktail (named after the famous brand of vermouth)
- Minestrone
- Mozzarella (from Italian mozzare 'to cut')
- Muscat (through French from Italian moscato)
- Orange (through French from Italian arancia, from Arabic naranj)
- Panini (Italian: panino, pl. panini)
- Parmesan (through French from Italian parmigiano, meaning 'from the city of Parma')
- Pasta
- Pepperoni (from Italian peperone, pl. peperoni, meaning 'bell pepper')
- Pesto (from Italian pestare 'to crush (with mortar and pestle)')
- Pistachio (Italian: pistacchio)
- Pizza
- Pizzaiolo
- Pizzeria
- Polenta
- Prosecco
- Provolone
- Radicchio
- Ravioli
- Risotto
- Salami (Italian: salame, pl. salami)
- Salumi (Italian pl. of salume 'salted meat')
- Scampi (Italian: scampo, pl. scampi)
- Semolina (Italian: semolino)
- Sfogliatelle (Italian sfogliatella, pl. sfogliatelle; from sfoglia 'thin layer')
- Sorbet (through French from Italian sorbetto, which in turn comes from Turkish, Persian and Arabic)
- Spaghetti (Italian: spaghetto, pl. spaghetti)
- Spumoni (Italian: spumone, pl. spumoni)
- Sultana (in Italian is the female of 'sultan'; the grape is called sultanina)
- Tagliatelle (from Italian tagliare 'to cut')
- Tortellini (Italian tortellino, pl. tortellini)
- Trattoria
- Tutti frutti
- Vermicelli
- Vino
- Zucchini (Italian: zucchina, pl. zucchine)

== Clothes, accessories, furniture ==
- Baldachin (from Italian baldacchino; Baldacco is an old Italian name for Baghdad)
- Brocade (from Italian broccato through Spanish)
- Costume (through French)
- Desk (perhaps via Italian desco)
- Jeans (after the city of Genoa through French Gênes)
- Muslin (through French mousseline from Italian mussolina after the city of Mosul)
- Organza (after the city of Urgenč)
- Parasol (from Italian parasole through French)
- Stiletto (in Italian it means 'little stylus' and refers to a type of thin, needle-pointed dagger, while the shoes are called tacchi a spillo, literally 'needle heels')
- Umbrella (from Italian ombrello)
- Valise (from Italian valigia through French)

== Geography and geology ==
- Archipelago (through Italian arcipelago, from Greek arkhipélagos)
- Lagoon (Italian: laguna)
- Littoral (Italian: litorale)
- Marina (from Italian mare 'sea')
- Riviera (from Italian "riviera", coming from Latin ripa 'coastline')
- Sirocco (Italian: scirocco, from Arabic)
- Terra rossa

Some toponyms of Latin, Greek, Slavic or Arabic origin referring to non-Italian places entered English through Italian:

- Aleppo
- Angora
- Cairo
- Crimea
- Monaco
- Monte Carlo
- Montenegro
- Negroponte
- Santorini
- Tripoli
- Valletta
- Vienna

territories named after Italian explorers:

- America after Amerigo Vespucci
- Colombia after Christopher Columbus
- British Columbia after Christopher Columbus

== Commerce and finance ==
- Bank (Italian: banco or banca)
- Bankrupt (Italian: bancarotta)
- Carat / karat (from Italian carato – from Arabic – through French)
- Career (from Old Provençal or Italian carriera via French, ultimately of Gaulish origin)
- Cartel (through French and German, from Italian cartello, meaning 'poster')
- Cash (from Italian cassa through French caisse and Provençal)
- Credit (from Italian credito through French)
- Del credere (Italian: star del credere)
- Ducat (from Italian ducato, whose main meaning is 'duchy')
- Florin (through French from Italian fiorino)
- Lira
- Lombard (through French, from Italian lombardo meaning an inhabitant of Lombardy or also Northern Italy)
- Mercantile (through French)
- Management (from Italian mano for maneggiamento, meaning 'hand' for "handlement")
- Ponzi scheme (from Charles Ponzi)
- Post (from Italian posta through French poste)

== Military and weaponry ==
- Alert (from Italian à l'erte "on the watch" via French)
- Arsenal (Italian arsenale, from Arabic)
- Brigade (through French from Italian brigata)
- Brigand (through French from Italian brigante)
- Camouflage (from Italian camuffare "to disguise" via French)
- Cannon (through French from Italian cannone)
- Cavalier (from Italian cavaliere)
- Cavalry (through French cavalerie from Italian cavalleria)
- Catapult (through Latin catapulta from Italian catapulta)
- Citadel (through French citadelle from Italian cittadella)
- Colonel (through French from Italian colonnello)
- Condottieri (Italian condottiero, pl. condottieri)
- Infantry (through French infanterie from Italian infanteria, Modern Italian: fanteria)
- Generalissimo
- Salvo (Italian salva)
- Scimitar (through Italian scimitarra from ancient Persian shamshir)
- Stiletto (Italian stiletto 'little stylus', an engraving tool)
- Stratagem (through French stratagème from Italian stratagemma, in its turn from Latin and Greek)
- Venture (Italian ventura)

== Crime and immorality ==
- Assassination (from Italian assassinio. The first to use this Italian word was William Shakespeare in Macbeth. Shakespeare introduced a lot of Italian or Latin words into the English language. Assassin and assassination derive from the word hashshashin (Arabic: حشّاشين, ħashshāshīyīn, also hashishin, hashashiyyin, means Assassins), and shares its etymological roots with hashish. It referred to a group of Nizari Shia Persians who worked against various Arab and Persian targets.
- Assassin (from Italian assassino)
- Attack (from Florentine Italian attaccare via French)
- Bandit (from Italian bandito)
- Bordello
- Casino (in Italian means 'hunting cottage' or 'brothel', and – figuratively – 'mess' or 'a lot')
- Charlatan (through French from Italian ciarlatano)
- Cosa nostra
- Mafia and mafioso

== Politics ==
- Doge
- Fascism (Italian: fascismo)
- Fascist (Italian: fascista)
- Ghetto
- Machiavellian and Machiavellianism after Niccolò Machiavelli
- Manifesto (meaning 'poster' in Italian)
- Politico (meaning either 'political' or 'politician' in Italian)
- Propaganda

== Love and sex ==
- Bimbo (from Italian bimbo 'child')
- Casanova
- Dildo (from Italian diletto, meaning 'pleasure')
- Inamorata (from Italian innamorata, a female lover)
- Ruffian (Italian: m. ruffiano, f. ruffiana)

== Science and nature ==
- Antenna
- Belladonna
- Cascade (from Italian cascata through French)
- Flu (from influenza)
- Influenza
- Lava
- Lazaret (Italian: lazzaretto)
- Manganese
- Malaria
- Medico
- Neutrino
- Parma violet (Italian: violetta di Parma, after the city of Parma)
- Pellagra
- Quarantine (Italian: quarantena)
- Saliva
- Tarantula (through Medieval Latin from Italian tarantola, after the city of Taranto)
- Volcano (Italian: vulcano derived from the name of Vulcano, a volcanic island in the Aeolian Islands, which in turn derives from Vulcanus, the Roman god of fire)
- Zebra (through Portuguese)
- Zero (from Arabic)

words after Italian scientist names:

- Avogadro constant after Amedeo Avogadro
- Eustachian tube after Bartolomeo Eustachi
- Fallopian tubes after Gabriele Falloppio
- Fermion, Fermium, Fermi (unit), Fermi level after Enrico Fermi
- Fibonacci series after Leonardo Fibonacci
- Galilean transformation after Galileo Galilei
- Galvanic, Galvanize after Luigi Galvani
- Marconi rig after Guglielmo Marconi
- Lagrangian after Giuseppe Luigi Lagrangia
- Pareto distribution after Vilfredo Pareto
- Ricci curvature after Gregorio Ricci-Curbastro
- Torr after Evangelista Torricelli
- Venturi tube after Giovanni Battista Venturi
- Volt after Alessandro Volta

== Religion, rituals, holidays ==
- Biretta (Italian: berretta)
- Camerlengo
- Carnival (through French from Italian carnevale)
- Confetti (from Italian confetto, pl. confetti, meaning 'dragée'; in Italian confetti are called coriandoli)
- Intaglio (burial mound) (from the art usage)
- Masquerade (through French from Italian mascherata)
- Monsignor (Italian: monsignore)
- Padre (in Italian means 'father')
- Promession (Italian promessa 'promise')

== Games and sports ==
- Arcade (from Italian arcata "arch of a bridge" via French)
- Carousel (from Italian carusiello via French. Etymologically related to "car".)
- Catenaccio (from catenaccio 'door-bolt', a defensive tactic in association football)
- Curva (a curved stadium grandstand)
- Fianchetto (Italian fianchetto 'little flank', a chess tactic)
- Lottery (Italian: lotteria)
- Tarot (through French) and taroc (Italian tarocco)
- Tifo (literally meaning 'typhus') and tifosi (from Italian tifosi 'sports fans', 'supporters')
- Ultras (from Latin "ultra", fanatical fans)
- Tombola
- Zona mista (literally meaning 'mixed zone'; often referred to as "Gioco all'italiana" or "The Game in the Italian style")
- Libero (from Italian libero 'free', a defensive specialist posit position in modern volleyball)

== Others ==
- Antenna
- Armature (through Italian plural armature singular armatura, in English rebar, short for reinforcing bar)
- Balloon (from Italian pallone "large ball" from a Germanic source)
- Berlinetta (from berlinetta 'little saloon', a two-seater sports car)
- Bravado (through French bravade from Italian bravata)
- Brave (through French from Italian bravo)
- Capisce ('understand', third-person hortatory subjunctive form of capire, often misspelled kapish, or kapeesh)
- Ciao (from ciao, an informal greeting or valediction, originally from Venetian sciavo '(your humble) servant'
- de)
- Cognoscente (from Italian conoscente, Italian: conoscitore)
- Dilemma (Italian dilemma from Greek dilemmaton)
- Dilettante (in Italian means 'amateur')
- Ditto
- Genoa after the city
- Gonzo (in Italian means 'simpleton', 'diddled')
- Humanist (through French from Italian umanista)
- Inferno (in Italian means 'hell')
- Latrine (through Italian plural latrine from Latin lavatrina)
- Lido (in Italian means 'coast', usually 'sandy coast')
- Lipizzan (Italian: lipizzano)
- Major-domo (Italian: maggiordomo)
- Mizzen (through French misaine from Italian mezzana)
- Mustache (from Italian mostaccio via French and ultimately from Greek)
- Nostalgia (with the same meaning in Italian)
- Paparazzi (Italian paparazzi, plural of paparazzo, the name of a character in the film La Dolce Vita)
- Pococurante (from poco 'little' and curante 'caring')
- Poltroon (through French poltron from Italian poltrona)
- Pronto
- Regatta (Italian: regata)
- Vendetta (in Italian means 'vengeance')
- Vista (in Italian means 'sight')
- Viva

== Sources ==
- D. Harper, Online Etymology Dictionary

== See also ==
- wiktionary:Category:English terms derived from Italian
- List of Italian musical terms used in English
