= Gesture language =

Gesture language or gestural language may refer to:

- Sign language, languages that use manual communication to convey meaning
- Manually coded language, representations of oral languages in a gestural-visual form
- Gesture, bodily actions to communicate particular messages, with or in place of speech

== See also ==
- Nonverbal communication
