= Indian Signing System =

Convention for manually coded language used in India

The Indian Signing System or Indian Sign System (ISS) is a convention for manually coded language used in India. It uses the words (signs) of Indian Sign Language with the word order and grammar of at least six official oral languages of India, including Urdu (Signed Urdu), Hindi (Signed Hindi), Marathi (Signed Marathi), Telugu (Signed Telugu) and Tamil (Signed Tamil).
