= Floris Italicae lingue libri novem =

Front Page of Floris Italicae Linguae Libri Novem presented by Prof. Claudio Marazzini at the Inauguration of the reprinted volume by VECCHIARELLI EDITORE S.r.l. in April 2011

Floris Italicae linguae libri novem ("The Flower of Italian Language in nine books") is a book written by Florentine scholar and cleric Agnolo Monosini (1568–1626), who played a key role in the development of the Italian language two hundred years prior to the Risorgimento. The book was published in 1604, as a collection of many vernacular Italian proverbs and idioms, comparing and contrasting them with Greek and Latin.

== Description ==
The Floris Italicae linguae libri novem, printed in Venice in 1604, is mostly known within the realm of scholarship and specialization. More cited than read, used as a repertoire of curiosities rather than as a proposal for a linguistic theory of the vernacular language, the book is currently experiencing a revival in contemporary debates.

Agnolo Monosini’s work originated from a will to respond to contemporary French writers, who in the 16th century were busy with demonstrating the relationship between their own language and ancient Greek, so as to circumvent the Latin inheritance and thus the primacy of Italian humanism over that of France. The relationship that Monosini develops between Greek and vulgar Italian, has all the limitations of the empirical and the author’s own enthusiasm for his method, with the result that the associations presented to the modern reader appear cumbersome and at times bizarre.

Greek becomes the refuge of the vernacular in order to fill those linguistic gaps left by Latin, when the latter could not supply an etymology - this leading Monosini to credit Homer’s language with a series of words that have nothing to do with Greek roots. However, those Hellenic suggestions that Monosini made in his lexicon, one may take them for correct within an Indo-European perspective.

The importance of Floris Italicae linguae libri novem is not altogether limited to the history of linguistics and lexicography. The systematisation with which Monosini progresses in the study of the presence of Greek in Italian draws a parabola from lexicon to morphology to the syntax of verbs and of the simple phrase, finally culminating in the proverb, which is considered the most characteristic and consolidated form of a language’s phraseology, and therefore the area that defines it more typically.

Monosini develops his own comparative grammar model, again of an empirical and non-logic character, that proves to be an effective phenomenological description of the language: in fact, he records a good quantity of phrases, expressions, proverbs, sayings, idioms recurring both in the literary, cultural language, and in the popular usage, even including the vernacular and trivial strata. Here too, Monosini attempts to establish relationships between Florentine and Greek syntagmas as he has done in the lexicon, but at this point the Floris Books November Italicae tongue assumes the guise of proverbial repertoire, which makes it truly remarkable notwithstanding its original linguistic aim. This section of the book may be regarded as the principal 17th century collection of its kind, not so much for the size (definitely considerable), as for the taxonomic effort and the wealth of erudition accompanying it.
