= Signed Italian =

Manually coded forms of the Italian language

Signed Italian (italiano segnato) and Signed Exact Italian (italiano segnato esatto) are manually coded forms of the Italian language used in Italy. They apply the words (signs) of Italian Sign Language to oral Italian word order and grammar. The difference is the degree of adherence to the oral language: Signed Italian is frequently used with simultaneous "translation", and consists of oral language accompanied by sign and fingerspelling. Signed Exact Italian has additional signs for Italian grammatical endings; it is too slow for general communication, but is designed as an educational bridge between sign and the oral language.

== Features ==
Signed Italian has its own grammatical rules, uses the lexicon of the Italian Sign Language, and follows the grammatical structure of spoken language. It does not include parts of speech such as articles, prepositions, verb conjugations, some pronouns, or agreement between article-noun-adjective-verb, as these create difficulties for deaf people in learning spoken and written language. In recent years, some research has been conducted in Italy and abroad on the linguistic competence achieved by deaf individuals in spoken language, revealing that this competence is often incomplete. One such study conducted on Italian deaf individuals identified 6 types of errors:

- omission of articles and substitution between definite and indefinite articles;
- omission and substitution of pronouns;
- omission and substitution of prepositions;
- errors in verb tenses, moods, and conjugations;
- omission of auxiliary verbs;
- lexical imprecisions.

The difficulty for deaf individuals to understand and produce these parts of speech stems from the fact that these parts do not have tonic stress, thus having minimal acoustic intensity. Additionally, for this same reason, the mouth movement when pronouncing them is not emphasized, making them less visible. The child must therefore make a considerable effort, both to utilize the assistance that hearing aids can provide and to lip-read, and will tend to grasp the most significant parts in a dialogue while missing all the others. Highlighters - i.e., signs that provide visual and, where possible, semantic support to morphological rules - have been identified as support for this type of difficulty. It is important to expose the young deaf child to the full complexity of spoken language, assisting them with gestural support, to ensure that their development respects that of their hearing peers.

== See also ==
- Signed English and Signing Exact English
