= Signed Dutch =

Coded form of Dutch using the signs of Dutch Sign language

Nederlands met Gebaren (NmG), or Signed Dutch, is a manually coded form of Dutch, using the signs of Dutch Sign Language, that is used for pedagogical purposes in the Netherlands. Signed Dutch is different from Dutch Sign Language in that when speaking Signed Dutch, one still speaks the actual Dutch words, and uses Dutch Sign Language to accentuate more important words, instead of completely speaking through sign language as is done in Dutch Sign Language.

NmG uses the grammar of spoken Dutch and also has the same sayings and expressions. Due to its resemblances to spoken Dutch, it is usually preferred by post-lingually deaf Dutch speakers over Dutch Sign Language.
