= Manually coded language in South Africa =

Bridge between signed and oral languages

In South Africa, manually coded language is used in education, as a bridge between South African Sign Language (SASL) and the eleven official oral languages of the country. These codes apply the signs of SASL to the grammar of the oral languages, resulting in Signed English, Signed Afrikaans, Signed Xhosa, Signed Zulu, etc. They are not a natural form of communication among deaf people.

Manually coded language is commonly used instead of SASL for simultaneous translation from an oral language into sign, for example at the Deaf Forum that is held annually at different locations in the Western Cape. The result is that, while deaf people from different language communities can communicate with each other without difficulty in SASL, they cannot understand "sign language" interpreters unless they have been schooled in the particular manually coded language used by the interpreter. That is, while they share a common language in SASL, they differ in their understanding of Signed English, Signed Afrikaans, Signed Xhosa, etc., which are not a normal form of communication for anyone. This results in the common misconception among even deaf South Africans that there are various sign languages in the country, when in fact there is only one.

A very different form of manually coded language is cued speech, an aid to lipreading which has been developed for Afrikaans, South African English, and Setswana.
