= Agnolo Monosini =

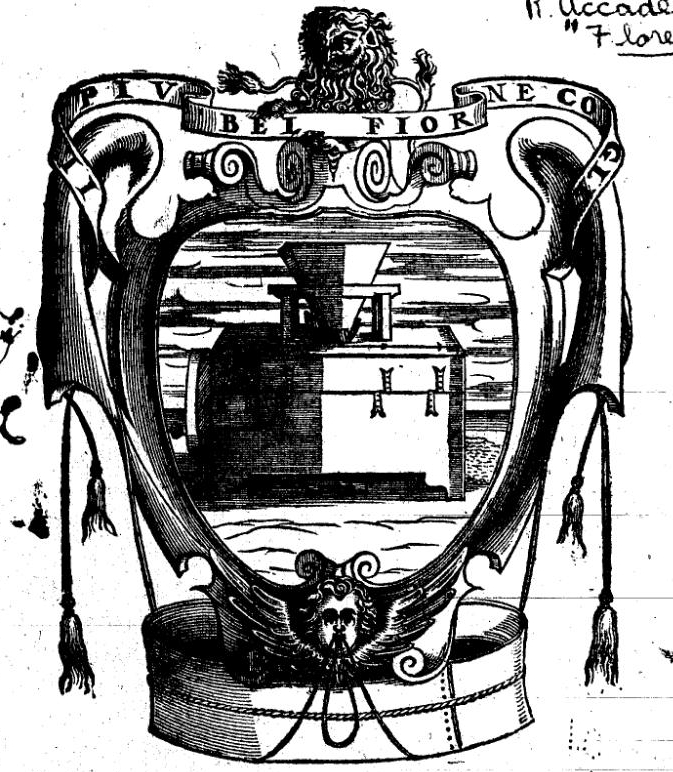
- Device (emblem) of the Accademia della Crusca (Academy of Chaff) depicting a sieve straining out corrupt words and structures (as wheat is separated from chaff)
- Born: 29 October 1568; Pratovecchio, Grand Duchy of Tuscany
- Died: 5 July 1626 (aged 57); Florence, Grand Duchy of Tuscany
- Occupation: Linguist

Agnolo Monosini (Pratovecchio 1568 – Florence 1626) was an Italian scholar and cleric of the 16th and 17th centuries, who played a key role in the development of the Italian language two hundred years prior to the risorgimento.

He was a native of Pratovecchio and studied with the Accademia della Crusca in Florence, where he contributed to its first Vocabolario della lingua italiana, published in 1623, in particular adding an index of Greek words.

== A passion for words ==
Monosini had one craze which consumed all his intellectual energies: that of proving the Greek origins of the Florentine idiom, which would one day develop into modern Italian. He was reacting to French writers of the period who took great pains to relate their own language directly with Ancient Greek, bypassing the inheritance of Latin and Italian and Alpine Humanism.

The relationships that Monosini develops between Greek and his contemporary vernacular rather suffer from his unconditional enthusiasm, with the result that the associations proposed are often cumbersome and sometimes quite bizarre.

Front page of Floris Italicae Lingue Libri Novem presented by Prof. Claudio Marazzini at the inauguration of the reprinted volume by VECCHIARELLI EDITORE S.r.l. in April 2011

== Floris Italicae ==
In his key work, Floris Italicae linguae libri novem (The Flower of Italian Language in a nine books) published in 1604, he collected many vernacular Italian proverbs and idioms, and compared and contrasted them with Greek and Latin.

Floris Italicae particularly concentrated on proverbs and language from Tuscany and the high Maremma, and thus included many aspects of the ‘vulgar’ vernacular language which were to become part of the official Italian language at the time of the Risorgimento.

Floris Italicae was re-published in 2011, with a companion volume of etymology and proverbs from the period.
