= Sotto voce =

Intentionally lowering the volume of one's voice for emphasis

Sotto voce (/ˈsɒtoʊ ˈvoʊtʃi, -tʃeɪ/, Italian: [ˈsotto ˈvoːtʃe]; literally 'under the voice') means intentionally lowering the volume of one's voice for emphasis. The speaker gives the impression of uttering involuntarily a truth which may surprise, shock, or offend. Galileo Galilei's (probably apocryphal) utterance "Eppur si muove" ("And yet [the Earth] moves"), spoken after deciding to recant his heliocentric theory, is a legendary example of a sotto voce utterance.

== Uses ==
=== Law ===
In law, "sotto voce" on a transcript indicates a conversation heard below the hearing of the court reporter.

=== Drama, literature and rhetoric ===
In drama, literature and rhetoric, sotto voce is used to denote emphasis attained by lowering one's voice rather than raising it, similar to the effect provided by an aside. Also similar to an aside, sotto voce can be used to express a character's thoughts out loud. For example, in Chapter 4 of Jane Eyre, Charlotte Brontë uses the term sotto voce to describe Mrs. Reed's manner of speaking after arguing with Jane:

'I am not your dear; I cannot lie down. Send me to school soon, Mrs. Reed, for I hate to live here.'

'I will indeed send her to school soon', murmured Mrs. Reed, sotto voce; and gathering up her work, she abruptly quitted the apartment.

— Jane Eyre
