= Manually coded language =

Signed phonetic representations of verbal languages

Manually coded languages are a family of gestural communication methods which include gestural spelling as well as constructed languages which directly interpolate the grammar and syntax of oral languages in a gestural-visual form—that is, signed versions of oral languages. Unlike the sign languages that have evolved naturally in deaf communities, these manual codes are the conscious invention of deaf and hearing educators, and as such lack the distinct spatial structures present in native deaf sign languages. MCLs mostly follow the grammar of the oral language—or, more precisely, of the written form of the oral language that they interpolate. They have been mainly used in deaf education in an effort to "represent English on the hands" and by sign language interpreters in K-12 schools, although they have had some influence on deaf sign languages where their implementation was widespread.

== History ==
It is unknown when the first attempts were made to represent an oral language with gesture. Indeed, some have speculated that oral languages may have evolved from sign languages, and there may be undocumented cases in history when vocal and signed modes of a language existed side by side. It is not uncommon for people to develop gestures to replace words or phrases in contexts where speech is not possible or not permitted, such as in a television studio, but these are usually limited in scope and rarely develop into complete representations of an oral language. One of the most elaborated examples of this kind of auxiliary manual system is Warlpiri Sign Language, a complete signed mode of spoken Warlpiri which was developed by an Indigenous community in central Australia due to cultural proscriptions against speech. Sign language linguists usually make a distinction between these auxiliary sign languages and manually coded languages; the latter are specifically designed for use in Deaf education, and usually represent the written form of the language.

In seventh century England, the years of (672-735), Venerable Bede, a Benedictine monk, proposed a system for representing the letters of the Latin script on the fingers called fingerspelling. Monastic sign languages used throughout medieval Europe used manual alphabets as well as signs, and were capable of representing a written language, if one had enough patience. Aside from the commonly understood rationale of observing a "vow of silence", they also served as mnemonics for preachers. These manual alphabets began to be used to teach the deaf children of royalty in 17th century Spain. Such alphabets are in widespread use today by signing deaf communities for representing words or phrases of the oral language used in their part of the world.

The earliest known attempt to develop a complete signed mode of a language which could be used to teach deaf children was by the Abbé de l'Épée, an educator from 18th century France. While the Deaf community already used a sign language, now known as Old French Sign Language, Épée thought it must be primitive, and set about designing a complete visual-gestural system to represent the concepts of religion and law that he wanted to impart to his pupils. His system of signes méthodiques was quite idiosyncratic, and although it was not a strict representation of French, its success laid the groundwork for the "signed oral languages" of today. The real proliferation of such systems occurred in the latter half of the 20th century, and by the 1980s manually coded languages were the dominant form of communication used by teachers and interpreters in classrooms with deaf students in many parts of the world. Most sign language "interpreting" seen on television in the 1970s and 1980s would have in fact been a literal translation of an oral language into a manually coded language.

The emerging recognition of sign languages in recent times has curbed the growth of manually coded languages, and in many places interpreting and educational services now favor the use of the natural sign languages of the Deaf community. In some parts of the world, MCLs continue to be developed and supported by state institutions; a contemporary example is Arabic Sign Language. Some MCL systems, such as the Paget Gorman Sign System have survived by shifting their focus from deaf education to people with other kinds of communication needs.

== Criticisms ==
The use of MCLs is controversial and has been opposed since Épée's time by "oralists" who believe Deaf people should speak, lipread and use hearing aids rather than sign—and on the other side by members of the American Sign Language (ASL) community (see Deaf culture) who resist a wide or exclusive application of MCLs for both philosophical and practical reasons. English is not fully able to express the ability of those with disabled hearing to communicate, and just as written forms of spoken languages are useful but cumbersome for daily communication, these manual codes cannot supplant a natural Signed Language. Nevertheless, elements of these systems have had some influence on deaf sign languages (see Contact sign).

Research in the U.S. has shown that manually coded English is usually applied incompletely and inconsistently in classrooms: Hearing teachers tend to "cut corners" by not signing word endings and "function words", most likely because they slow down the pace and distort the phrasing of the teacher's natural speech. The result is a kind of "Pidgin Sign English" which lacks the grammatical complexity of both English and American Sign Language.

== Major approaches ==
There have been many different approaches to manually coding oral languages. Some consist of fingerspelling everything, a technique sometimes known in English as the "Rochester method" after Rochester School for the Deaf in New York where it was used from 1878 until the 1940s. While most MCLs are slower than spoken or sign languages, this method is especially so and in modern times is generally considered not to be accessible to children. However, some deafblind people still communicate primarily using the Rochester Method. Most manually coded languages can accommodate simultaneous communication—that is, signing and speaking at the same time—although the natural pace of speech may need to be slowed down at times.

The Paget Gorman Sign System (PGSS) is an MCL that began development in the 1930s by Sir Richard Paget. He studied extant sign languages and looked to create an easier way to understand signs that were pantomimic in nature. He worked with Grace Paget (his wife) and Pierre Gorman, who both took over his work after his death in 1955. Paget published a book in 1951 focusing on children's vocabulary that included 900 signs.

In 1964, PGSS was taught for the first time to a group of deaf adults in an experiment. It evolved from education for the deaf to teaching those with speech and language disorders. New systems were developed for deaf adults to transition into British Sign Language (BSL), thus causing the pivot in use.

PGSS currently has an estimated 56,000 word combinations.

=== Signed oral languages ===
These systems ("Signed English", "Signed German" and so on) were the vehicle for the world-wide explosion of MCLs in deaf education in the second half of the 20th century, and are what is generally meant by the phrase "manually coded language" today. They aim to be a word-for-word representation of the written form of an oral language, and accordingly require the development of an enormous vocabulary. They usually achieve this by taking signs ("lexicon") from the local deaf sign language as a base, then adding specially created signs for words and word endings that do not exist in the deaf sign language, often using "initializations", and filling in any gaps with fingerspelling. Thus "Signed English" in America (based on ASL) has a lexicon quite different from "Signed English" in Britain (based on BSL), as well as the Signed Englishes of Ireland, Australasia and South Africa. "Signing Exact English" (SEE2) was developed in the United States in 1969, has also been taught around the world, and is now used in deaf schools in Singapore, and taught in classes by the Singapore Association for the Deaf.

=== Mouth–hand systems ===
Another widespread approach is to visually represent the phonemes (sounds) of an oral language, rather than using signs for the words. These systems are sometimes known as "Mouth Hand Systems" (MHS). An early example was developed in Denmark in 1903 by Georg Forchhammer. Others include the Assisted Kinemes Alphabet (Belgium) and a Persian system developed in 1935 by Jabar Baghtcheban—in addition to the most widespread MHS worldwide, Cued Speech. As the entire set of phonemes for an oral language is small (English has 35 to 45, depending on the dialect), an MHS is relatively easy to adapt for other languages.

Cued Speech can be seen as a manual supplement to lipreading. A small number of hand shapes (representing consonants) and locations near the mouth (representing vowels) differentiate between sounds not distinguishable from on the lips; in tonal languages, the inclination and movement of the hand follows the tone. When viewed together with lip patterns, the gestures render all phonemes of the oral language intelligible visually.

Cued Speech is not traditionally referred to as a manually coded language; although it was developed with the same aims as the signed oral languages, to improve English language literacy in Deaf children, it follows the sounds rather than the written form of the oral language. Thus, speakers with different accents will "cue" differently.

Cued speech has been used to prepare deaf children for hearing aids and cochlear implants by teaching the prospective wearer the oral language's phonemes. By the time the child has received a hearing aid or has been implanted with a cochlear implant, the child does not need such intense auditory training to learn to hear the oral language.

== List of signed languages ==
Below are some of the signed systems that have been developed for various oral languages. They range from formal systems that encode the grammar of the oral language, to informal systems of using sign together with speech, to translating oral words one-by-one to sign.

See Australian Aboriginal sign languages for traditional manually coded languages such as Warlpiri Sign Language.

Language		Signed encoding
Afrikaans		Signed Afrikaans (signs of SASL)
Amharic		Signed Amharic
Arabic		Signed Arabic
Mandarin Chinese		Wenfa Shouyu 文法手語 ('Grammatical Sign Language', Signed Mandarin (Taiwan))
Danish		Signed Danish
Dutch		Nederlands met Gebaren, NmG (Signed Dutch, the Netherlands)
English	generic English	The Rochester Method—(different manual alphabets are used in different regions). Signed English depends on signs from the local sign language.
English	American English	American Signed English; Seeing Essential English (SEE1); Signing Exact English (SEE2); Linguistics of Visual English (LOVE); Conceptually Accurate Signed English (CASE)
English	Australian English and New Zealand English	Australasian Signed English
English	British English	British Signed English; Sign Supported Speech (SSS) or Sign Supported English (SSE) (speaking English with key-word signing); Paget Gorman Signed Speech (PGSS)
English	Hiberno-English (Ireland)	Irish Signed English, using signs from Irish Sign Language (Ireland) and Signed English, using signs from Northern Ireland Sign Language (Northern Ireland)
English	Kenyan English	Kenya Signed English
English	South African English	South African Signed English (using SASL signs)
Esperanto		Signuno
Finnish		Signed Finnish
French		Signed French
German		Signed German – Lautsprachbegleitende Gebärden (LBG, 'signs accompanying speech') and Lautsprachunterstützende Gebärden (LUG, 'signs supporting speech')
Hebrew		Signed Hebrew (oral Hebrew accompanied by sign)
Hindi-Urdu and other languages of India		Indian Signing System (ISS) (vocabulary taken from ISL, adapted to at least six Indian languages)
Indonesian		Sistem Isyarat Bahasa Indonesia (SIBI, 'Signed Indonesian')
Italian		italiano segnato 'Signed Italian' and italiano segnato esatto 'Signed Exact Italian'
Japanese		Signed Japanese, 日本語対応手話 (also known as Manually Coded Japanese, Simultaneous Methodic Signs)
Malay		Bahasa Malaysia Kod Tangan (BMKT) (Manually Coded Malay)
Nepali		Signed Nepali, also known as Sign-Supported Nepali
Norwegian		Signed Norwegian
Polish		System Językowo-Migowy (SJM) (Signed Polish); Signing Exact Polish
Portuguese		Signed Portuguese
Russian		Signed Russian
Spanish		Signed Spanish (Mexico, Spain, and presumably elsewhere; also Signed Catalan)
Swedish		Tecknad svenska, ('Signed Swedish'), developed in the 1970s but now largely out of use
Toki Pona		toki pona luka, ('toki pona by hand'), published in Toki Pona: The Language of Good
Urdu		Signed Urdu (Pakistan)
Xhosa		Signed Xhosa (and similarly other official languages of South Africa)

== See also ==
- Contact sign — a variety or style of signing arising from contact between a spoken or manually coded language and a deaf sign language.
- Fingerspelling — a means of representing the written alphabet of an oral language, but often a central part of natural sign languages.
- Makaton

== Bibliography ==
- ISO 639-2 codes for "signed oral languages" (e.g. Ethnologue Table C)
- Cued Languages – list of languages and dialects to which Cued Speech has been adapted.
- Sign Languages and Codes of the World by Region and by Name – Gallaudet University library online
- Rehab Council of India
- Kluwin, T. (1981). The grammaticality of manual representation of English in classroom settings. American Annals of the Deaf, 126, 417–421.
- Marmor, G. & Pettito, L. (1979). Simultaneous communication in the classroom: How well is English grammar represented? Sign Language Studies, 23, 99–136.
- Woodward, J. & Allen, T. (1988). Classroom use of artificial sign systems by teachers. Sign Language Studies, 61, 405–418.
