= Language isolate =

Language that has no demonstrable genetic relationship with other languages

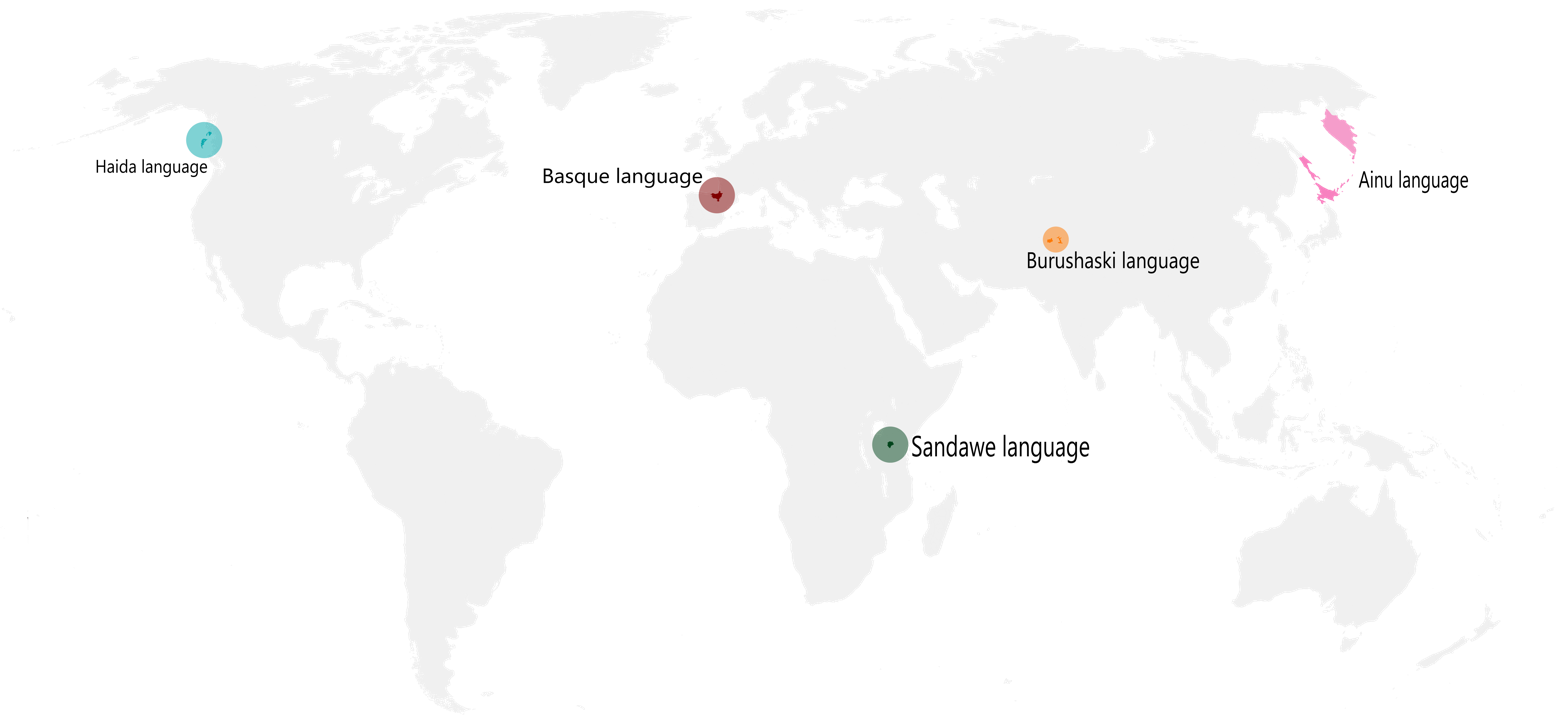
Locations of a few examples of language isolates

A language isolate, sometimes called an isolated language, is a language that has no demonstrable genealogical relationship with any other language. That is, an isolate is a language family that only contains one member. Basque in Europe, Ainu (if counted as a single language) and Burushaski in Asia, Sandawe and Hadza in Africa, Haida and Zuni in North America, Kanoê and Trumai in South America, Tiwi and possibly Porome in Oceania are examples of language isolates, as too are well attested extinct languages such as Sumerian and Elamite. The exact number of language isolates is unknown due to insufficient data on several languages; that is, there is a fuzzy boundary between language isolates and unclassified languages. Researchers may have differing criteria on how much comparative work needs to be done before concluding that a language is an isolate.

"Isolate" does not mean that a language has no relatives, only that any relationships are too distant to be detectable. Most established families of oral languages – including isolates – are assumed to be related to each other at a time depth too great for us to reconstruct. (See linguistic monogenesis.)

Another possibility is that the language arose independently and does not share a common linguistic genesis with any other language. This possibility is often posited for sign languages that are thought to have developed independently of other oral or sign languages.

In some classifications, a language may be counted as an isolate once all known relatives are extinct. An example is the Ket language spoken in central Siberia, which belongs to the wider Yeniseian family, all the others of which are now extinct. Ket is thus an isolate in the current context. However, most classifications do not count Ket as a language isolate because it does have demonstrable relatives, even if they no longer exist except in recorded data. If those relatives had gone extinct without being recorded, then Ket would be an isolate in the stricter sense.

Isolates may be reclassified as larger families if some of their purported dialects are later judged to be sufficiently different from each other to count as different languages. Examples include the erstwhile isolates of Japanese and Georgian: Japanese is now considered to be the Japonic language family (which includes the Ryukyuan languages), and Georgian to be the Kartvelian language family.

There is a difference between language isolates and unclassified languages, but they can be difficult to differentiate when data is limited. If comparative efforts do prove fruitful, a language previously considered an isolate may be reclassified as being part of a larger language family, as happened with the Yanyuwa language of northern Australia, now placed in the Pama–Nyungan family. Since linguists do not always agree on whether a genetic relationship has been demonstrated, it is often disputed whether a particular language is an isolate.

== Genetic relationships ==
A genetic relationship is when two different languages are descended from a common ancestral language. This is what makes up a language family, which is a set of languages for which sufficient evidence exists to demonstrate that they descend from a single ancestral language and are therefore genetically related. For example, English is related to other Indo-European languages and Mandarin Chinese is related to other Sino-Tibetan languages. By this criterion, each language isolate constitutes a family of its own.

Isolates at the family level are not to be confused with lower-level isolates, single languages that form a primary branch of a larger language family. Examples are Armenian, an isolate within the Indo-European family, and Paiwan, an isolate within the Austronesian family.

== Extinct isolates ==
Caution is required when speaking of extinct languages as language isolates. Despite their great age, Sumerian and Elamite can be safely classified as isolates, as the languages are well enough documented that, if modern relatives existed, they would be recognizably related. A language thought to be an isolate may turn out to be related to other languages once enough material is recovered, but this is unlikely for extinct languages whose written records have not been preserved.

Many extinct languages are very poorly attested, which may lead to them being considered unclassified languages (or even unclassifiable languages) rather than language isolates. This occurs when linguists do not have enough information on a language to classify it as either a language isolate or as a part of another language family.

== Isolates v. unclassified languages ==
Unclassified languages are different from language isolates in that they have no demonstrable genetic relationships to other languages due to a lack of sufficient data. In order to be considered a language isolate, a language needs to have sufficient data for comparisons with other languages through methods of historical-comparative linguistics to show that it does not have any detectable genetic relationships.

Many extinct and living languages today are very poorly attested, and the fact that they cannot be linked to other languages may be a reflection of linguists' poor knowledge of them. Hattic, Gutian, and Kassite are all considered unclassified languages, but their status is disputed by a minority of linguists who count them as isolates. Many extinct languages of the Americas such as Cayuse and Majena may likewise have been isolates.

== Oral language isolates ==
Below is a list of spoken language isolates, arranged by continent, along with notes on possible relationships to other languages.

The status column indicates the degree of endangerment of the language, according to the definitions of the UNESCO Atlas of the World's Languages in Danger. "Vibrant" languages are those in full use by speakers of every generation, with consistent native acquisition by children. "Vulnerable" languages have a similarly wide base of native speakers, but a restricted use and the long-term risk of language shift. "Endangered" languages are either acquired irregularly or spoken only by older generations. "Moribund" languages have only a few remaining native speakers, with no new acquisition, highly restricted use, and near-universal multilingualism. "Extinct" languages have no native speakers, but are sufficiently documented to be classified as isolates.

=== Africa ===
All of Africa's languages had once been gathered into four major phyla: Afroasiatic, Niger–Congo, Nilo-Saharan and Khoisan. Of these, only Afroasiatic has been established as a valid family, and even there there are doubts that some of the peripheral languages are actually Afroasiatic. Khoisan has been completely abandoned, the two major branches of Niger–Congo (as well as several smaller branches) cannot be shown to be related, and there has been persistent doubt about Nilo-Saharan. Data for several African languages, especially extinct ones like Kwisi, is not sufficient for classification. In addition, Jalaa, Shabo, Laal, Kujargé, and a few other languages within Nilo-Saharan and Afroasiatic-speaking areas may turn out to be isolates upon further investigation. Defaka and Ega are highly divergent languages located within Niger–Congo-speaking areas, and may also possibly be language isolates.

Language	Speakers	Status	Countries	Comments
Bangime	3,500	Vibrant	Mali	Spoken in the Bandiagara Escarpment. Used as an anti-language.
Bayot	35,000	Vibrant	Senegal, Guinea-Bissau	Basic vocabulary shows no relation to other languages.
Gule	Extinct		Sudan	Although this language is poorly known, Zamponi (2025) unambiguously classified it as an isolate. Not enough evidence exists to classify it as one of the Koman languages.
Hadza	1,000	Vulnerable	Tanzania	Spoken on the southern shore of Lake Eyasi in the southwest of Arusha Region. Once listed as an outlier among the Khoisan languages. Language use is vigorous, though there are fewer than 1,000 speakers.
Jalaa	Extinct		Nigeria	Strongly influenced by Dikaka, but most vocabulary is very unusual.
Laal	750	Moribund	Chad	Spoken in three villages along the Chari River in Moyen-Chari Region. Poorly known. Also known as Gori. Possibly a distinct branch of Niger–Congo, Chadic of the Afroasiatic languages, or mixed.
Mpra	Extinct		Ghana	It is known only from a 70-word list given in a 1931 article. Blench (2007) considers it to be a possible language isolate.
Ongota	12	Moribund	Ethiopia	Likely isolate.
Sandawe	60,000	Vibrant	Tanzania	Spoken in the northwest of Dodoma Region. Tentatively linked to the Khoe languages.
Shabo	400	Endangered	Ethiopia	Spoken in Anderaccha, Gecha, and Kaabo of the Southern Nations, Nationalities, and Peoples' Region. Linked to the Gumuz and Koman families in the proposed Komuz branch of the Nilo-Saharan languages.
Siamou	40,000	Vibrant	Burkina Faso, Mali, Ivory Coast	Traditionally classified as Kru. Due to lack of evidence or any resemblance is classified now as an isolate.

=== Asia ===
Language	Speakers	Status	Countries	Comments
Ainu	3	Moribund	Japan	Spoken on the island of Hokkaido in Japan. Sometimes hypothesized to be related to Korean and Japanese, while at other times proposed to be a branch of Altaic.
Bugun	900	Endangered	India	Possible language isolate spoken by the Bugun people of Arunachal Pradesh in India.
Burushaski	130,000	Vulnerable	Pakistan, India	Spoken in the Yasin Valley and Hunza Valley of Gilgit-Baltistan and Hari Parbat of Jammu and Kashmir. Linked to Caucasian languages, Indo-European, Yeniseian, and Na-Dene languages in various proposals.
Elamite	Extinct		Iran	Formerly spoken in Elam, along the northeast coast of the Persian Gulf. Attested from around 2800 BC to 300 BC. Some propose a relationship to the Dravidian languages (see Elamo-Dravidian), but this is not well-supported. Some scholars also believe a language called Khuzi, spoken perhaps until 1000 AD and reported in Medieval Islamic sources, may have represented Elamite.
Hruso	3,000	Vulnerable	India	Possible language isolate spoken by the Hruso people of Arunachal Pradesh in India.
Kusunda	23	Moribund	Nepal	Spoken in Gandaki Province. The recent discovery of a few speakers shows that it is not demonstrably related to anything else. Sometimes considered one of the Tibeto-Burman languages. Since linguists have either claimed its vocabulary is obviously Tibeto-Burman, or that it's almost completely free of Tibeto-Burman cognates, this may be a case of language interference in a dying tongue.
Miju	18,000	Endangered	India	Possible language isolate spoken by the Miju Mishmi of Arunachal Pradesh in India.
Nihali	2,500	Endangered	India	Spoken in northern Maharashtra along the Tapti River. Strong lexical Munda influence from Korku, as well as Dravidian and Indo-Aryan languages. Used as anti-language by speakers.
Nivkh	200	Moribund	Russia	Also known as Gilyak. Spoken in the lower Amur River basin and in the northern part of Sakhalin. Dialects sometimes considered two languages. Has been linked to Altaic and Chukotko-Kamchatkan languages.
Northern Andamanese	3	Moribund	India	Once part of the larger Great Andamanese languages, now the sole surviving language.
'Ole	1	Moribund	Bhutan	ʼOle, also called ʼOlekha or Black Mountain Monpa, is a moribund, possibly Sino-Tibetan language spoken natively by 1 person in the Black Mountains of Wangdue Phodrang and Trongsa Districts in western Bhutan. The term ʼOle refers to a clan of speakers.
Puroik	20,000	Vulnerable	India, China	Possible language isolate spoken by the Puroik people of Arunachal Pradesh in India and of Lhünzê County, Tibet, in China.
Sumerian	Extinct		Iraq	Spoken in Mesopotamia until around 1800 BC, but used as a classical language until 100 AD. Long-extinct, but well-attested language of ancient Sumer.
Tambora	Extinct		Indonesia	Poorly documented, extinct since the 1815 eruption of Mount Tambora, basic vocabulary points towards it being an isolate.
Vedda	300	Endangered	Sri Lanka	Highly influenced by Sinhala and Tamil to the extent some linguists have classed it as a creole language.

=== Oceania ===
Current research considers that the "Papuasphere" centered in New Guinea includes as many as 37 isolates. (The more is known about these languages in the future, the more likely it is for these languages to be later assigned to a known language family.) To these, one must add several isolates found among non-Pama-Nyungan languages of Australia:

Language	Speakers	Status	Countries	Comments
Abinomn	300	Vibrant	Indonesia	Spoken in the far north of New Guinea. Also known as Bas or Foia. Language is considered safe by UNESCO but endangered by Ethnologue.
Abun	3,000	Vibrant	Indonesia	Spoken in the northern area of Bird's Head Peninsula located in the province of Southwest Papua. Linked to West Papuan languages but Palmer (2018), Ethnologue, and Glottolog consider it an isolate.
Anêm	800	Vibrant	Papua New Guinea	Spoken on the northwest coast of New Britain. Perhaps related to Yélî Dnye and Ata.
Ata	2,000	Vibrant	Papua New Guinea	Spoken in the central highlands of New Britain. Also known as Wasi. Perhaps related to Yélî Dnye and Anem.
Burmeso	250	Vibrant	Indonesia	Spoken in Mamberamo Raya Regency, Papua Province. Linked to West Papuan languages but Stephen Wurm and William A. Foley consider it an isolate.
Busa	370	Vibrant	Papua New Guinea	Spoken in Sandaun Province, northwestern Papua New Guinea. Added to Senu River.
Giimbiyu	Extinct		Australia	Spoken in the northern part of Arnhem Land until the early 1980s. Sometimes considered a small language family consisting of Mengerrdji, Urningangk and Erre. Part of a proposal for the undemonstrated Arnhem Land language family.
Isirawa	1,800	Vibrant	Papua New Guinea	Whilst classed as a Kwerbic language, it only shares 20% of its vocabulary and is considered by some linguists to be an isolate.
Kol	4,000	Vibrant	Papua New Guinea	Spoken in the northeastern part of New Britain. Possibly related to the poorly known Sulka, or the Baining languages, suggested as part of the East Papuan languages.
Kuot	1,500	Vibrant	Papua New Guinea	Spoken on New Ireland. Also known as Panaras. Suggested to form part of the East Papuan family.
Lavukaleve	1,700	Vulnerable	Solomon Islands	Classified as an isolate by Endangered Languages Project; historically classified as a Central Solomon language, but little evidence was found of a relationship by Muller.
Malak-Malak	10	Moribund	Australia	Spoken in northern Australia. Often considered part of one Northern Daly family together with Tyeraity. Used to be considered genetically related to the Wagaydyic languages, but nowadays they are considered genetically distinct.
Marrgu	Extinct		Australia	Marrgu had been assumed to be an Iwaidjan language like its neighbours. However, Evans (2006) has produced evidence that it was a language isolate, with possible connection to the extinct and poorly attested Wurrugu.
Mawes	Extinct		Indonesia	Likely isolate.
Maybrat	25,000	Vibrant	Indonesia	Spoken in the central area of the Bird's Head Peninsula located in the province of Southwest Papua. Sometimes linked to West Papuan languages but others consider it an isolate.
Molof	230	Vulnerable	Indonesia	Usher (2020) tentatively suggests it may be related to Pauwasi languages. However, Søren Wichmann (2018) and Foley (2018) consider it to be an isolate.
Mpur	5,000	Vibrant	Indonesia	Spoken in the Mpur and Amberbaken Districts, Tambrauw Regency on the north coast of the Bird's Head Peninsula.
Murrinh-patha	2,100	Vibrant	Australia	Spoken on the eastern coast of Joseph Bonaparte Gulf in the Top End. The proposed linkage to Ngan'gityemerri in one Southern Daly family is generally accepted to be valid.
Ngan'gityemerri	26	Moribund	Australia	Spoken in the Top End along the Daly River. The proposed linkage to Murrinh-patha in one Southern Daly family is generally accepted to be valid.
Porome	1,200	Vibrant	Papua New Guinea	Spoken in 6 villages in West Kikori Rural LLG and East Kikori Rural LLG of Gulf Province, near the Aird Hills and Kikori River tributaries.
Pyu	250	Vulnerable	Papua New Guinea	Spoken in Green River Rural LLG in Sandaun Province, near the Indonesian border. Linked to neighboring Left May and Amto-Musan in a proposed Arai-Samaia family.
Sulka	2,500	Vibrant	Papua New Guinea	Spoken across the eastern end of New Britain. Suggested to form part of the East Papuan family.
Tause	500	Vulnerable	Indonesia	Was classified to encourage research as a Lakes Plain language, but there has been little evidence so has been classed as an isolate.
Tayap	<50	Moribund	Papua New Guinea	Formerly spoken in the village of Gapun. Links to Lower Sepik languages and Torricelli languages have been explored, but the general consensus among linguists is that it is an isolate unrelated to surrounding languages.
Tiwi	2,100	Vulnerable	Australia	Spoken in the Tiwi Islands in the Timor Sea. Traditionally Tiwi is polysynthetic, but the Tiwi spoken by younger generations is not.
Touo	1,900	Vulnerable	Solomon Islands	Classified as an isolate by Glottolog.
Umbugarla	Extinct		Australia	Possibly a language isolate. Ngomburr likely a dialect.
Usku	20 ~ 160	Moribund	Indonesia	Foley (2018) classifies it as a language isolate.
Wagiman	11	Moribund	Australia	Spoken in the southern part of the Top End. May be distantly related to the Yangmanic languages, which might in turn be a member of the Macro-Gunwinyguan family, but neither link has been demonstrated.
Wardaman	50	Moribund	Australia	Spoken in the southern part of the Top End. The extinct and poorly attested Dagoman and Yangman dialects are sometimes treated as separate languages, forming a Yangmanic family, to which Wagiman may be distantly related. Possibly a member of the Macro-Gunwinyguan family, but this has yet to be demonstrated.
Yele	5,000	Vibrant	Papua New Guinea	Stebbins et al. (2018) classifies Yélî Dnye as an isolate. They explain similarities with Austronesian as being due to contact and diffusion.

=== Europe ===
Language	Speakers	Status	Countries	Comments
Basque	806,000 (2021), 434,000 passive speakers	Vulnerable	Spain, France	Natively known as Euskara, the Basque language is found in the historical region of the Basque Country between France and Spain. It has no known living relatives, although Aquitanian is commonly regarded as related to or a direct ancestor of Basque. Some linguists have claimed similarities with various languages of the Caucasus that are indicative of a relationship, while others have proposed a relation to Iberian and to the hypothetical Dené–Caucasian languages.

=== North America ===
Language	Speakers	Status	Countries	Comments
Alsea	Extinct		United States	Poorly attested. Spoken along the central coast of Oregon until the early 1950s. Sometimes regarded as two separate languages. Often included in the Penutian hypothesis in a Coast Oregon Penutian branch.
Atakapa	Extinct		United States	Spoken on the Gulf coast of eastern Texas and southwestern Louisiana until the early 1900s. Often linked to Muskogean in a Gulf hypothesis.
Cayuse	Extinct		United States	Spoken in Oregon until the 1930s. Classified as a language isolate per Campbell (2024).
Chimariko	Extinct		United States	Spoken in northern California until the 1950s. Part of the Hokan hypothesis.
Chitimacha	Extinct		United States	Well-attested. Spoken along the Gulf coast of southeastern Louisiana until 1940. Possibly in the Totozoquean family of Mesoamerica.
Coahuilteco	Extinct		United States, Mexico	Spoken in southern Texas and northeastern Mexico until the 1700s. Part of the Pakawan hypothesis, has been linked to the hypothesised Hokan languages in a larger group.
Cotoname	Extinct		United States, Mexico	Spoken in extreme southern Texas and northeastern Mexico until c. 1900. Part of the Pakawan hypothesis, has been linked to the hypothesised Hokan languages in a larger group.
Cuitlatec	Extinct		Mexico	Spoken in northern Guerrero until the 1960s. Has been proposed to be part of Macro-Chibchan and Uto-Aztecan.
Esselen	Extinct		United States	Poorly known. Spoken in the Big Sur region of California until the early 1800s. Part of the Hokan hypothesis.
Haida	13	Moribund	Canada, United States	Spoken in the Haida Gwaii archipelago off the northwest coast of British Columbia, and the southern islands of the Alexander Archipelago in southeastern Alaska. Some proposals connect it to the Na-Dené languages, but these have fallen into disfavor.
Huave	20,000	Vulnerable	Mexico	Spoken in the Isthmus of Tehuantepec, in the southeast of Oaxaca state. Has been linked to various language families, but is still generally considered an isolate.
Karuk	12	Moribund	United States	Spoken along the Klamath River in northwestern California. Part of the Hokan hypothesis, but little evidence for this.
Keres	13,200	Endangered	United States	Spoken in several pueblos throughout New Mexico, including Cochiti and Acoma Pueblos. Has two main dialects: Eastern and Western. Sometimes those two dialects are separated into languages in a Keresan family.
Kutenai	345	Moribund	Canada, United States	Spoken in the Rockies of northeastern Idaho, northwestern Montana and southeastern British Columbia. Attempts have been made to place it in a Macro-Algic or Macro-Salishan family, but these have not gained significant support.
Natchez	Extinct		United States	Spoken in southern Mississippi and eastern Louisiana until 1957. Often linked to Muskogean in a Gulf hypothesis. Attempts at revival have produced six people with some fluency.
Purépecha	142,500	Endangered	Mexico	Spoken in the north of Michoacán state. Language of the ancient Tarascan kingdom. Sometimes regarded as two languages.
Salinan	Extinct		United States	Spoken along the south-central coast of California. Part of the Hokan hypothesis.
Seri	720	Vulnerable	Mexico	Spoken along the coast of the Gulf of California, in the southwest of Sonora state. Part of the Hokan hypothesis.
Siuslaw	Extinct		United States	Spoken on the southwest coast of Oregon until 1960. Likely related to Alsea, Coosan languages, or possibly the Wintuan languages. Part of the Penutian hypothesis.
Takelma	Extinct		United States	Spoken in western Oregon until mid 20th century. Part of the Penutian hypothesis.
Timucua	Extinct		United States	Well attested. Spoken in northern Florida and southern Georgia until the mid- to late 1700s. Briefly spoken in Cuba by a migrant community established in 1763. A connection with the poorly known Tawasa language has been suggested, but this may be a dialect.
Tonkawa	Extinct		United States	Spoken in central and northern Texas until the early 1940s.
Tunica	Extinct		United States	Spoken in western Mississippi, northeastern Louisiana, and southeastern Arkansas until 1948.
Washo	20	Moribund	United States	Spoken along the Truckee River in the Sierra Nevada of eastern California and northwestern Nevada. Part of the Hokan hypothesis.
Yana	Extinct		United States	Well-attested. Spoken in northern California until 1916. Part of the Hokan hypothesis.
Yuchi	Extinct		United States	Spoken in Oklahoma, but formerly spoken in eastern Tennessee. A connection to the Siouan-Catawban languages has been proposed. The last native speaker died in 2021, but there is an ongoing revitalization project that has trained a small number of L2s.
Zuni	9,600	Vulnerable	United States	Spoken in Zuni Pueblo in northwestern New Mexico. Links to Penutian and Keres have been proposed.

=== South America ===
Language	Speakers	Status	Countries	Comments
Aikanã	150	Endangered	Brazil	Spoken in the Amazon of eastern Rondônia. Links to Kanoê and Kwaza have been tentatively proposed. Arawakan has been suggested.
Mato Grosso Arára	Extinct		Brazil	Spoken in Mato Grosso, Brazil until sometime in the 20th century.
Andaqui	Extinct		Colombia	Spoken in the southern highlands of Colombia until the 1970s. It has been linked to the Paezan or Barbacoan languages, but no connections have been sufficiently demonstrated. Adelaar (2004) classifies it as a language isolate, but lists similarities with Páez.
Andoque	370	Endangered	Colombia, Peru	Spoken on the upper reaches of the Japurá River. Extinct in Peru. Extinct Urequena is close.
Arutani	6	Moribund	Brazil, Venezuela	Spoken along the Paragua River and Uraricaá River in the far southern area of Bolívar State, Venezuela and the far northern area of Roraima, Brazil. Part of the proposed Arutani–Sape language family but more likely to be an isolate.
Betoi	Extinct		Venezuela	Spoken in the Apure River basin near the Colombian border until the 19th century. Paezan and Tucanoan affiliation have been suggested.
Candoshi-Shapra	1,100	Endangered	Peru	Spoken along the Chapuli, Huitoyacu, Pastaza, and Morona river valleys in southwestern Loreto. Has been linked to various language families, but no agreement exists on its classification.
Canichana	Extinct		Bolivia	Spoken in the Llanos de Moxos region of Beni Department until around 2000. Connections with various language families have been proposed, none widely accepted.
Cayuvava	12	Moribund	Bolivia	Spoken in the Amazon west of Mamore River, north of Santa Ana del Yacuma in the Beni Department.
Chimane	5,300	Vulnerable	Bolivia	Spoken along the Beni river in Beni Department. Also spelled Tsimané. Sometimes split into multiple languages in a Moséten family. Linked to the Chonan languages in a Moseten-Chonan hypothesis.
Chiquitano	2,400	Endangered	Bolivia, Brazil	Spoken in the eastern part of Santa Cruz department and the southwestern part of Mato Grosso state. Has been linked to the Macro-Jê family.
Chono	Extinct		Chile	Spoken in Chonos Archipelago and Chiloé Archipelago until around 1875. Glottolog and Campbell (2024) characterize it as a language isolate.
Cofán	1,500	Endangered	Colombia, Ecuador	Spoken in northern Sucumbíos Province and southern Putumayo Department. Also called A'ingae. Sometimes classified as Chibchan, but the similarities appear to be due to borrowings. Seriously endangered in Colombia.
Culle	Extinct		Peru	Spoken in Peru until the mid-20th century.
Esmeralda	Extinct		Ecuador	Spoken in Ecuador by a mixed Black-Indigenous population in the late 19th century.
Guachí	Extinct		Argentina	Formerly spoken in Argentina by the Guachí. Linkage has been proposed to the Mataco–Guaicuru language family, however Campbell (2012) classifies it as an isolate.
Guamo	Extinct		Venezuela	Spoken in Venezuela until some time after 1778.
Guató	2	Moribund	Brazil	Spoken in the far south of Mato Grosso near the Bolivian border. Has been classified as Macro-Jê, but this is disputed.
Hodï	640	Vulnerable	Venezuela	Spoken in Amazonas state in Venezuela. Linked with the Macro-Puinavean hypothesis.
Iatê	1,000	Moribund	Brazil	Spoken in the states of Paraíba, Pernambuco, Alagoas, Sergipe, and the northern part of Bahia. Divided into two dialects, Fulniô and Yatê. Sometimes classified as a Macro-Jê language.
Irantxe	90	Endangered	Brazil	Spoken by the Irántxe and Mỹky peoples in the state of Mato Grosso in Brazil. Recent descriptions of the language analyze it as a language isolate. According to Arruda (2003), it "bears no similarity with other language families".
Itonama	1	Moribund	Bolivia	Spoken in the far-eastern part of Beni Department. A relationship to Paezan has been suggested.
Kamëntšá	4,000	Endangered	Colombia	Spoken in Sibundoy in the Putumayo Department. Also known as Camsa, Coche, Sibundoy, Kamentxa, Kamse, or Camëntsëá.
Kanoê	3	Moribund	Brazil	Spoken in southeastern Rondônia. Also known as Kapishana. Tentatively linked to Kwaza and Aikanã. Part of a Macro-Paesan proposal.
Kunza	Extinct		Chile	Spoken in areas near Salar de Atacama until the 1950s. Also known as Atacameño. Part of a Macro-Paesan proposal.
Kwaza	25	Moribund	Brazil	Spoken in eastern Rondônia. Connections have been proposed with Aikanã and Kanoê.
Leco	20	Moribund	Bolivia	Spoken at the foot of the Andes in the department of La Paz.
Máku of Auari	Extinct		Brazil	Spoken on the Brazil–Venezuela border in Roraima until 2000. Also known as Jukude or Maku. Likely language isolate. Has been linked to the Arutani–Sape and the Macro-Puinavean language families.
Mapuche	260,000	Vulnerable	Chile, Argentina	Spoken in areas of the far-southern Andes and in the Chiloé Archipelago. Also known as Mapudungun, Araucano or Araucanian. Variously part of Andean, Macro-Panoan, or Mataco–Guaicuru proposals. Sometimes Huilliche is treated as a separate language, reclassifying Mapuche into an Araucanian family.
Matanawi	Extinct		Brazil	Spoken on the Castanha River and Madeirinha River in Amazonas in Brazil until the middle of the 20th century. Has been linked to the Mura-Pirahã language.
Mochica	Extinct		Peru	Spoken along the northwest coast of Peru and in an inland village until c. 1920. Usually considered to be a language isolate, but has also been hypothesized as belonging to a wider Chimuan language family.
Movima	1,400	Vulnerable	Bolivia	Spoken in the Llanos de Moxos, in the north of Beni Department. Affiliations with Canichana, Chibcha and Macro-Tucanoan have been proposed, none of these have been proven.
Munichi	Extinct		Peru	Spoken in the southern part of Loreto Region until the late 1990s. Possibly evolved either from a mixed language or a sister language to Proto-Arawak.
Mure	Extinct		Bolivia	Formerly spoken in the Jesuit Missions of Moxos in Beni Department. Isolate according to Glottolog, but past proposals include links to Chapacuran
Nasayuwe	60,000	Vulnerable	Colombia	Spoken in the northern part of Cauca Department. Also known as Páez. Several proposed relationships in the Paezan hypothesis but nothing conclusive.
Omurano	Extinct		Peru	Spoken near the Marañón River until 2006. Linkage to the Saparo–Yawan language family has been proposed.
Oti	Extinct		Brazil	Spoken in São Paulo until the early 1900s. Macro-Jê affiliation has been suggested, but not accepted.
Payaguá	Extinct		Argentina, Paraguay	Spoken in Argentina and Paraguay by the Payaguá until 1943. Linkage has been proposed to the Mataco–Guaicuru language family, however Campbell (2012) classifies it as an isolate.
Pirahã	380	Vibrant	Brazil	Spoken along the Maici River in Amazonas, Brazil. The only living dialect of Mura language.
Gününa Küne	Extinct		Argentina, Chile	Spoken in the Pampas region, last speaker died around 1960. Sometimes linked to Het, as part of the Chonan languages. Included in a proposed Macro-Jibaro family.
Puinave	3,000	Endangered	Colombia, Venezuela	Spoken in 32 communities along the banks of the Inírida River in Guainía Department, Colombia and in 10 communities along the Orinoco River, in the Colombia–Venezuela border region. Generally considered to be a language isolate, but has been linked frequently to Nadahup and Nukak-Kakwa.
Pumé	7,900	Vibrant	Venezuela	Spoken along the Orinoco, Cinaruco, Meta, and Apure rivers. Linked to the extinct Esmeralda language.
Puquina	Extinct		Bolivia, Peru	Spoken around Lake Titicaca until the 19th century.
Puri	Extinct		Brazil	Spoken in Minas Gerais and Rio de Janeiro states of Brazil until the late 19th century, Formerly considered Macro-Jê, but affiliation has been disproven.
Ramanos	Extinct		Bolivia	Spoken in Moxos Province in Bolivia until the 1790s. Isolate according to Glottolog.
Sapé	Extinct		Venezuela	Spoken along the Paragua River and Karuna River in Venezuela until 2018. Also known as Kaliana or Caliana. Part of the proposed Arutani–Sape language family but more likely to be an isolate.
Sechura	Extinct		Peru	Spoken in Peru until the late 19th century. Known from only two short wordlists, but linked to the Tallán language.
Tallán	Extinct		Peru	Spoken in Peru until the late 19th century. Known from only two short wordlists, but linked to the Sechura language.
Taruma	3	Moribund	Brazil, Guyana and Suriname	Originally spoken around the mouth of the Rio Negro river, now located in Maruranau village among the Wapishana. Kaufman (1990) proposed it to be distantly related to Katembri, but this relationship has not been repeated in recent surveys of South American languages by Campbell (2012), confirming that this language is an isolate.
Taushiro	1	Moribund	Peru	Spoken in the northeastern area of the Loreto province. Linkage to the Saparo–Yawan language family has been proposed.
Tequiraca	Extinct		Peru	Spoken in the central part of Loreto until the 1950s. Also known as Auishiri. A connection with Canichana has been proposed by Kaufman (1994).
Tinigua	1	Moribund	Colombia	Once part of a larger language family, is the sole surviving member of the Tiniguan languages
Trumai	51	Moribund	Brazil	Settled on the upper Xingu River. Currently reside in the Xingu National Park in the northern part of Mato Grosso.
Urarina	3,000	Vulnerable	Peru	Spoken in the central part of the Loreto Region. Part of the Macro-Jibaro proposal.
Waorani	2,000	Vulnerable	Ecuador, Peru	Also known as Sabela. Spoken between the Napo and Curaray rivers. Could be spoken by several groups living in isolation.
Warao	32,800	Endangered	Guyana, Suriname and Venezuela	Spoken in the Orinoco Delta.
Xukuru	Extinct		Brazil	Spoken in Pernambuco state, Brazil until the early 20th century. Only attestation is from wordlists collected in the 1950s-60s from rememberers.
Yahgan	Extinct		Chile	Spoken in far-southern Tierra del Fuego until 2022. Also called Yámana.
Yuracaré	2,700	Endangered	Bolivia	Spoken in the foothills of the Andes, in Cochabamba and Beni Departments. Connections to Mosetenan, Pano–Tacanan, Arawakan, and Chonan have been suggested.
Yurumanguí	Extinct		Colombia	Spoken in Colombia until sometime after 1768. Linked with the Hokan languages by Paul Rivet, but this is now rejected.

== Sign language isolates ==
A number of sign languages have arisen independently, without any ancestral language, and thus are true language isolates. (See linguistic polygenesis.) These include Nicaraguan Sign Language, a well-documented case of what has happened in schools for the deaf in many countries. In Tanzania, for example, there are seven schools for the deaf, each with its own sign language with no connection to any other language. Sign languages have also developed outside schools, in communities with high incidences of deafness, such as Kata Kolok in Bali, and half a dozen sign languages of the hill tribes in Thailand including the Ban Khor Sign Language, or in cities when people immigrate from the countryside and deaf children meet other deaf people for the first time, even without attending a school for the deaf.

These and more are all presumed to be absolute isolates or small independent families, because many deaf communities are made up of people whose hearing parents do not use sign language, and have manifestly, as shown by the language itself, not borrowed their sign language from other deaf communities during the recorded history of these languages.

=== List ===
Language	Users	Status	Countries	Comments
Adamorobe Sign	40	Endangered	Ghana	AdaSL is believed to have emerged over 200 years ago, alongside the settlement's founding.
Afghan Sign	190,000	Vibrant	Afghanistan	
Albanian Sign	24,000	Vibrant	Albania	It is unrelated to other sign languages of the Balkans.
Albarradas	1,000	Vulnerable	Mexico	
Algerian Jewish	Unknown	Moribund	Algeria	
Alipur	150-250	Endangered	India	
Angami Naga Sign	Extinct		India	
Armenian Sign	3,200–16,000	Vulnerable	Armenia	Wittmann (1991) posits that ArSL is a language isolate (a 'prototype' sign language).
Bamako	25,000	Vulnerable	Mali	A sign language that developed outside the Malian educational system, in the urban tea-circles of Bamako where deaf men gathered after work. It is used predominantly by men, and is threatened by the educational use of American Sign Language, which is the language of instruction for those deaf children who go to school.
Ban Khor	400	Vulnerable	Thailand	
Bay Islands	Unknown		Honduras	
Berbey	5	Moribund	Mali	Used by two families.
Bouakako	24	Endangered	Ivory Coast	LaSiBo has been used by several generations of deaf people, most of whom are related. 9 deaf and 15 fluent hearing speakers known
Brazilian	630,000	Vibrant	Brazil	Brazilian Sign Language is a well-established language and legally recognized.
Bribri Sign Language	Extinct		Costa Rica	
Brunca	Unknown		Costa Rica	
Bura	Unknown		Nigeria	Used by the Bura people around the village of Kukurpu, 40 km (25 miles) south-east of Biu, Nigeria, an area with a high degree of congenital deafness.
Carhuahuaran	Unknown		Peru	A multigenerational family sign language of the Quechua-speaking region of Peru.
Caucasian	Extinct		Armenia	
Central Taurus	Unknown	Vulnerable	Turkey	
Chatino	11	Moribund	Mexico	
Douentza	700~1300	Vulnerable	Mali	Also known as Dogon Sign language.
Enga Sign	Unknown		Papua New Guinea	an apparent village sign language among the Tato Enga people in Enga province, Papua New Guinea. It was reported in 1980 in three articles by Adam Kendon, based on ethnographic films of three signers (one deaf, two hearing) in the upper valley of the Lagaip River, but with reports of wider use in the surrounding region. Its current status is unknown, as no more recent information is available.
Ghandruk	20	Moribund	Nepal	
Guatemalan	50,000	Vibrant	Guatemala	
Guinea-Bissau	Unknown	Vibrant	Guinea-Bissau	An incipient sign language evolving from the single school for the deaf in Guinea-Bissau, which was founded in Bissau in 2003. In 2005 a linguist and Portuguese Sign Language teacher found GBSL to still be basic, but with some consistency among students in the school and village use when the students went home. It is not directly related to the Portuguese sign language, although it has borrowed the alphabet from it.
Hausa Sign	20,000~5,000,000	Vibrant	Nigeria	There are no statistics on the number of deaf people in northern Nigeria or in Nigeria in general or on the number of people who use Hausa Sign Language. Estimates as to the number of signers using this language "vary greatly, from 70,000 to five million".
Hawaiʻi Sign	40	Moribund	United States	
Henniker	Extinct		United States	Was a village sign language of 19th-century Henniker, New Hampshire and surrounding villages in the US. It was one of the three local languages which formed the basis of American Sign Language.
Inuit Sign	47	Endangered	Canada and Greenland	
Jamaican Country	7,500	Endangered	Jamaica	In 2007 it was estimated that the language would become extinct in the next twenty to thirty years
Jhankot	Unknown		Nepal	
Jumla Sign Language	8	Moribund	Nepal	a village sign language of the town of Jumla in western Nepal. There is a Nepalese Sign Language school in Jumla, and that the students come from a 1–2-day walk away and do not speak Jumla Sign Language.
Kaʼapor Sign	507	Vulnerable	Brazil	a village sign language used by the small community of Kaʼapor people in the Brazilian state of Maranhão
Kafr Qasem	50	Endangered	Israel-Palestine	
Kailge Sign	Unknown		Papua New Guinea	
Kajana	Unknown	Endangered	Suriname	a village sign language of Suriname. It is spoken in Kajana, a village of just three families.
Kata Kolok	1,240	Vulnerable	Indonesia	Deaf people in the village express themselves using special cultural forms such as deaf dance and martial arts and occupy special ritual and social roles, including digging graves and maintaining water pipes. Deaf and hearing villagers alike share a belief in a deaf god.
Keresign	15	Moribund	United States	Developed locally, and is unrelated to the trade language Plains Indian Sign Language.
Koniya	4	Moribund	Japan	
Old Cayman	Extinct		Cayman Islands	
Old Costa Rican	100	Moribund	Costa Rica	A deaf-community sign language of San Jose, spoken by people born before about 1945. Along with American Sign Language, it is one of the sources of New Costa Rican Sign Language.
Old Kentish	Extinct		United Kingdom	Was a village sign language of 17th-century Kent in the United Kingdom, that has been incorporated along with other village sign languages into British Sign Language.
Orocovis	25-50	Endangered	Puerto Rico	
Ottoman	Extinct		Turkey	It is not known whether Ottoman Sign Language was ancestral to modern Turkish Sign Language, as no signs were recorded.
Maldives Sign	2,700	Vulnerable	Maldives	
Maltese Sign	200	Vulnerable	Malta	LSM courses have been offered by the University of Malta since 2015. Despite official recognition, the Deaf community in Malta has struggled with shortages of qualified LSM interpreters.
Mardin	40	Moribund	Turkey	
Maroua	150	Endangered	Cameroon	Used by approximately 150 people in and around the town of Maroua, capital of the Far North Region of Cameroon.
Martha's Vineyard	Extinct		United States	was a village sign language that was once widely used on the island of Martha's Vineyard, United States, from the early 18th century to 1952. It was used by both deaf and hearing people in the community; consequently, deafness was not a barrier to participation in public life.
Maunabudhuk–Bodhe	Unknown		Nepal	
Mauritian	1,000	Vibrant	Mauritius	
Mayan Sign	417	Endangered	Mexico and Guatemala	Only 17 of the 417 users are deaf.
Mbour	Unknown		Senegal	Used in a neighborhood of the city of M'Bour in Senegal. Deaf people in the neighborhood meet regularly.
Mehek Sign	102	Vulnerable	Papua New Guinea	
Miyakubo	70	Vulnerable	Japan	
Mount Avejaha	Unknown	Vibrant	Papua New Guinea	a village sign language of Papua New Guinea. It is spoken in a remote village with many deaf children in the foothills of Mount Avejaha, in Oro Province. It is dissimilar from other village sign languages in New Guinea. The deaf are well integrated into the community.
Nanabin	25-30	Endangered	Ghana	a family sign language of the coastal Fante village of Ekumfi Nanabin in the Central Region of Ghana, ca. 8 km east of Mankessim. It is used by three generations of a single family which is mostly deaf. The second generation are bilingual in Ghanaian Sign Language.
Navajo Family	Unknown		Navajo Nation, United States	a sign language used by a small deaf community of the Navajo People.
Nicaraguan	3,000	Vibrant	Nicaragua	a sign language developed by deaf children in several schools in Nicaragua.
Plains Indian	Unknown	Vulnerable	United States and Canada	
Providence Island	19	Vulnerable	Colombia	a village sign language of the small island community of Providence Island in the Western Caribbean, off the coast of Nicaragua but belonging to Colombia. The island is about 15 square miles (39 km^{2}) and the total population is about 5000, of which an unusual proportion are deaf (5 in 1,000).
Rossel Island Sign	Unknown		Papua New Guinea	
Salvadoran	26,000	Vibrant	El Salvador	a language used by the deaf community in El Salvador. Its main purpose is to communicate and is used by about 15,000 people, or 0.25% of the population.
Sandy River Valley	Extinct		United States	was a village sign language of the 19th-century Sandy River Valley in Maine. Together with the more famous Martha's Vineyard Sign Language and Henniker Sign Language, it was one of three local languages which formed the basis of American Sign Language.
Saudi	100,000	Vibrant	Saudi Arabia	Unrelated to other Arab Sign languages
Sinasina Sign	30-55	Vulnerable	Papua New Guinea	
Sivia	27~30	Vulnerable	Peru	the deaf sign language of the Quechua town of Sivia in Peru. It is not related to Peruvian Sign Language.
South Rupununi Sign Language	"Seven plus villages"	Vulnerable	Guyana and Brazil	An indigenous village sign language used in at least seven Wapishana villages with a high degree of congenital deafness. The villages are located south of the town of Lethem in the Rupununi savannah of Guyana and Brazil.
Solomon Islands	3,000	Vibrant	Solomon Islands	Main sign language in Solomon Islands
Spanish Sign	60,000	Vibrant	Spain	
Sri Lankan Sign	13,000	Vibrant	Sri Lanka	Wittmann (1991) posits that the Sri Lankan languages, as a group, are a language isolate ('prototype' sign language), though one developed through stimulus diffusion from an existing sign language. It is not known if they are related to each other, nor how many there are.
Tebul	500	Vulnerable	Mali	a village sign language of the village of Uluban in the Dogon region of Mali, among speakers of Tebul Dogon.
Terena Sign	Unknown	Vulnerable	Brazil	a village sign language used by deaf Terena people in southern Brazil. Deaf Terena who attend school use LIBRAS there, but switch to Terena Sign when they return home.
Tibetan Sign	500	Endangered	China	
Trinidad and Tobago	2,000	Vulnerable	Trinidad and Tobago	
Turkish Sign	250,000	Vibrant	Turkey	
Ugandan	160,000	Vibrant	Uganda	
Venezuelan	86,000	Vibrant	Venezuela	The national deaf sign language of Venezuela.
Wanib	Unknown		Papua New Guinea	
Yolngu / Penguin Sign	5,000	Vibrant	Australia	Ritual Sign language of the Yolŋu
Yoruba Sign	32	Endangered	Nigeria	

== See also ==
- Unclassified languages
- List of language families

== Bibliography ==
- Campbell, Lyle, ed. 2017. Language Isolates. Routledge.
- Campbell, Lyle. (1997). American Indian languages: The Historical Linguistics of Native America. New York: Oxford University Press. ISBN 0-19-509427-1.
- Goddard, Ives (Ed.). (1996). Languages. Handbook of North American Indians (W. C. Sturtevant, General Ed.) (Vol. 17). Washington, D.C.: Smithsonian Institution. ISBN 0-16-048774-9.
- Goddard, Ives. (1999). Native Languages and Language Families of North America (rev. and enlarged ed. with additions and corrections). [Map]. Lincoln, NE: University of Nebraska Press (Smithsonian Institution). (Updated version of the map in Goddard 1996). ISBN 0-8032-9271-6.
- Grimes, Barbara F. (Ed.). (2000). Ethnologue: Languages of the world, (14th ed.). Dallas, TX: SIL International. ISBN 1-55671-106-9. (Online edition: Ethnologue: Languages of the World).
- Mithun, Marianne. (1999). The languages of Native North America. Cambridge: Cambridge University Press. ISBN 0-521-23228-7 (hbk); ISBN 0-521-29875-X.
- Salaberri, Iker, Krajewska, Dorota, Santazilia, Ekaitz & Zuloaga, Eneko (eds.). (2025). Investigating Language Isolates. Typological and Diachronic Perspectives. Amsterdam & Philadelphia: John Benjamins. ISBN 9789027218995, 9789027246295 doi:10.1075/tsl.135
- Sturtevant, William C. (Ed.). (1978–present). Handbook of North American Indians (Vol. 1–20). Washington, D. C.: Smithsonian Institution. (Vols. 1–3, 16, 18–20 not yet published).
