= Languages of Israel =

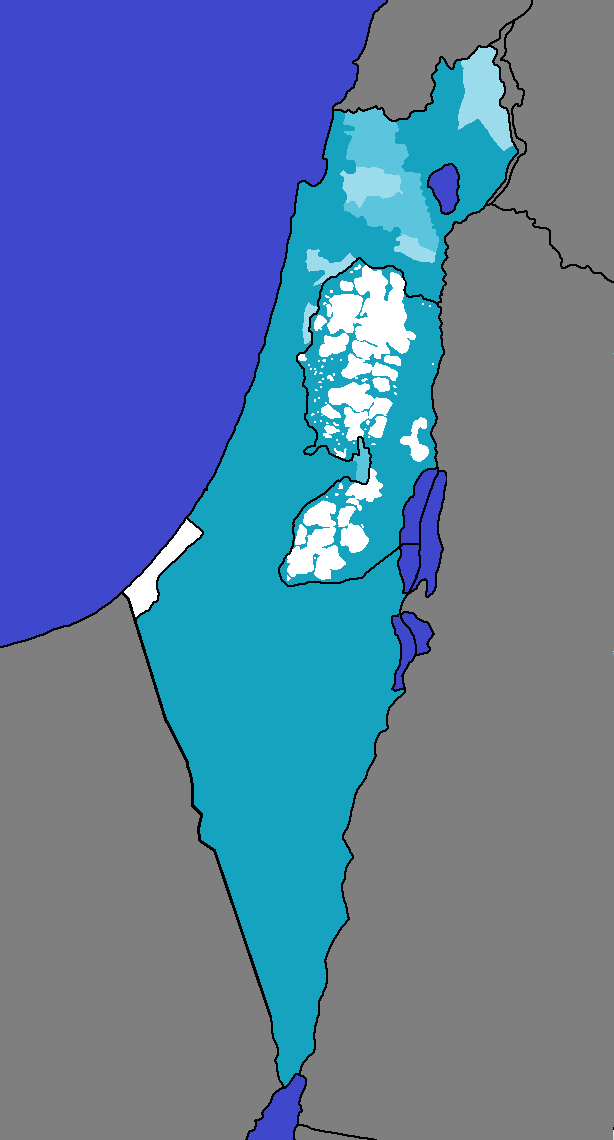
- Map showing languages in Israel, Golan Heights, West Bank and Gaza Strip. Blue shows dominantly Hebrew speaking areas, lighter blue shows mixed Hebrew and Arabic speaking areas, white shows dominantly Arabic speaking areas.
- Official: Hebrew
- Semi-official: Arabic
- Immigrant: Russian
- Foreign: English
- Signed: Israeli Sign Language
- Keyboard layout: Hebrew
- Ancient Hebrew; Aramaic; Phoenician; Akkadian; Ancient Egyptian

The Israeli population is linguistically and culturally diverse. Hebrew is the country's official language, and almost the entire population speaks it either as a first language or proficiently as a second language. Its standard form, known as Modern Hebrew, is the main medium of life in Israel. Arabic is used mainly by Arab citizens of Israel, who comprise about one-fifth of the population. Arabic has a special status under Israeli law.

English is known as a foreign language by a significant portion of the Israeli population as it is widely used in official logos and road signs alongside Hebrew and Arabic. Data collected between 2018 and 2020 by the National Center for Exams and Evaluation showed that 33% of Israeli students are able to hold a basic conversation in English; such data only refers to academic students who had declared to have studied English, which indicates that English knowledge among the general population is at a much lower level.

Russian is spoken by about 20% of the Israeli population, mainly due to the large immigrant population from the former Soviet Union. The 19th edition of Ethnologue lists 36 languages and dialects spoken through Israel.

According to a 2011 survey of Israelis over 20 years of age conducted by the Israel Central Bureau of Statistics, 49% report Hebrew as their native language, Arabic 18%, Russian 15%, Yiddish 2%, French 2%, English 2%, Spanish 1.6%, and 10% other languages (including Romanian, and Amharic, which were not offered as answers by the survey). The study also noted that 90% of Israeli Jews and over 60% of Israeli Arabs have a good understanding of Hebrew.

== History ==
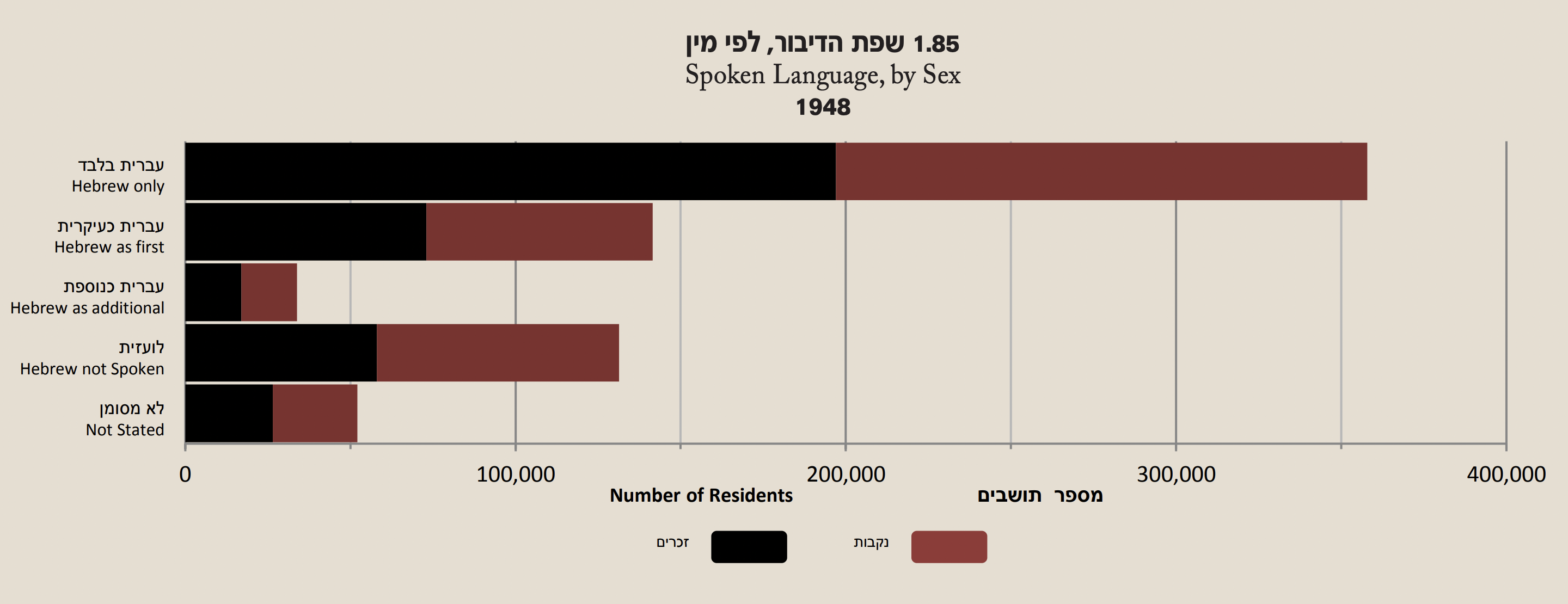
Spoken Language and Hebrew proficiency, by Sex in Israel according to the 1948 Census, male: black, female: brown

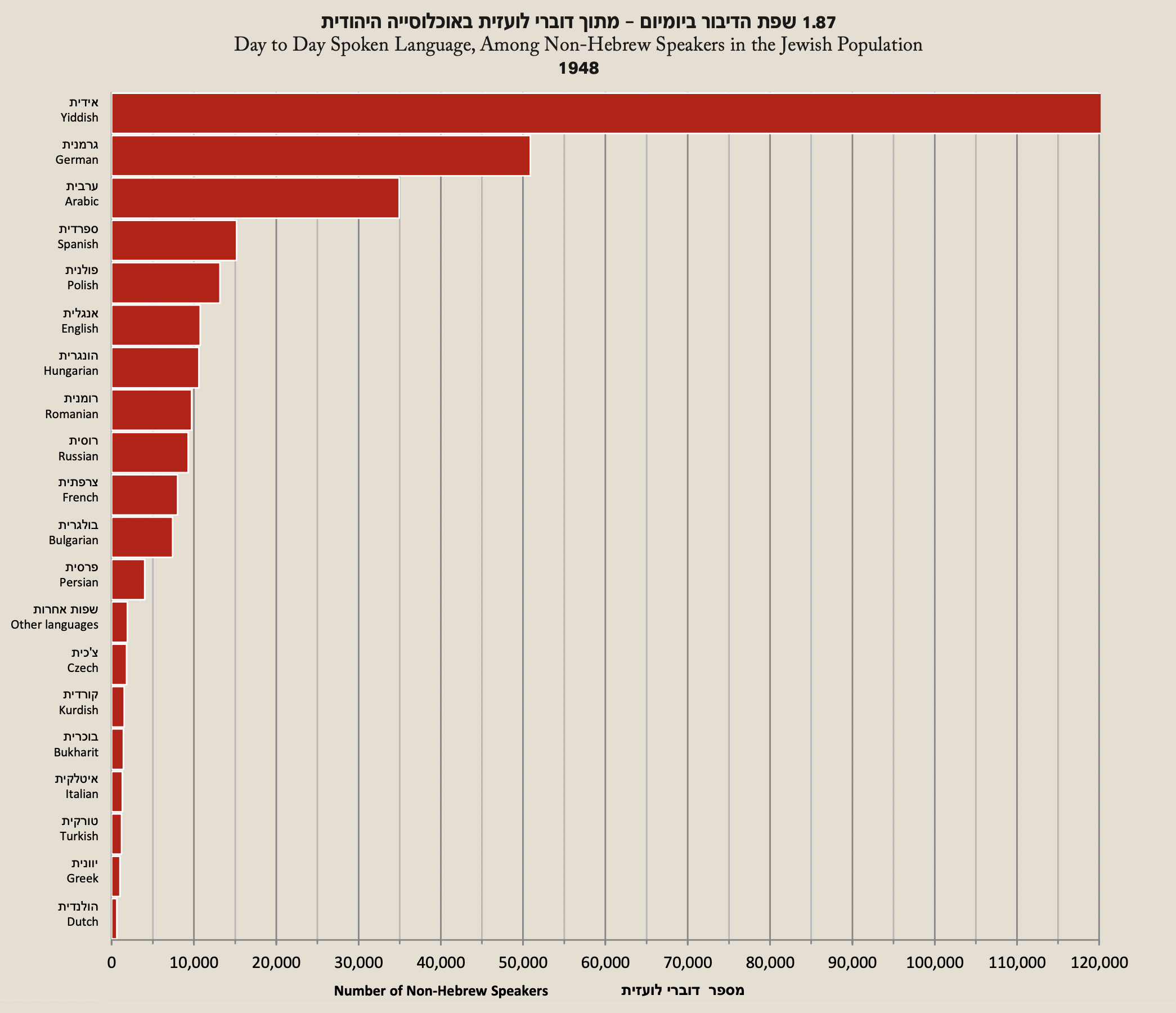
Israel: Day to Day Spoken Language, Among Non-Hebrew Speakers in the Jewish Population (1948)

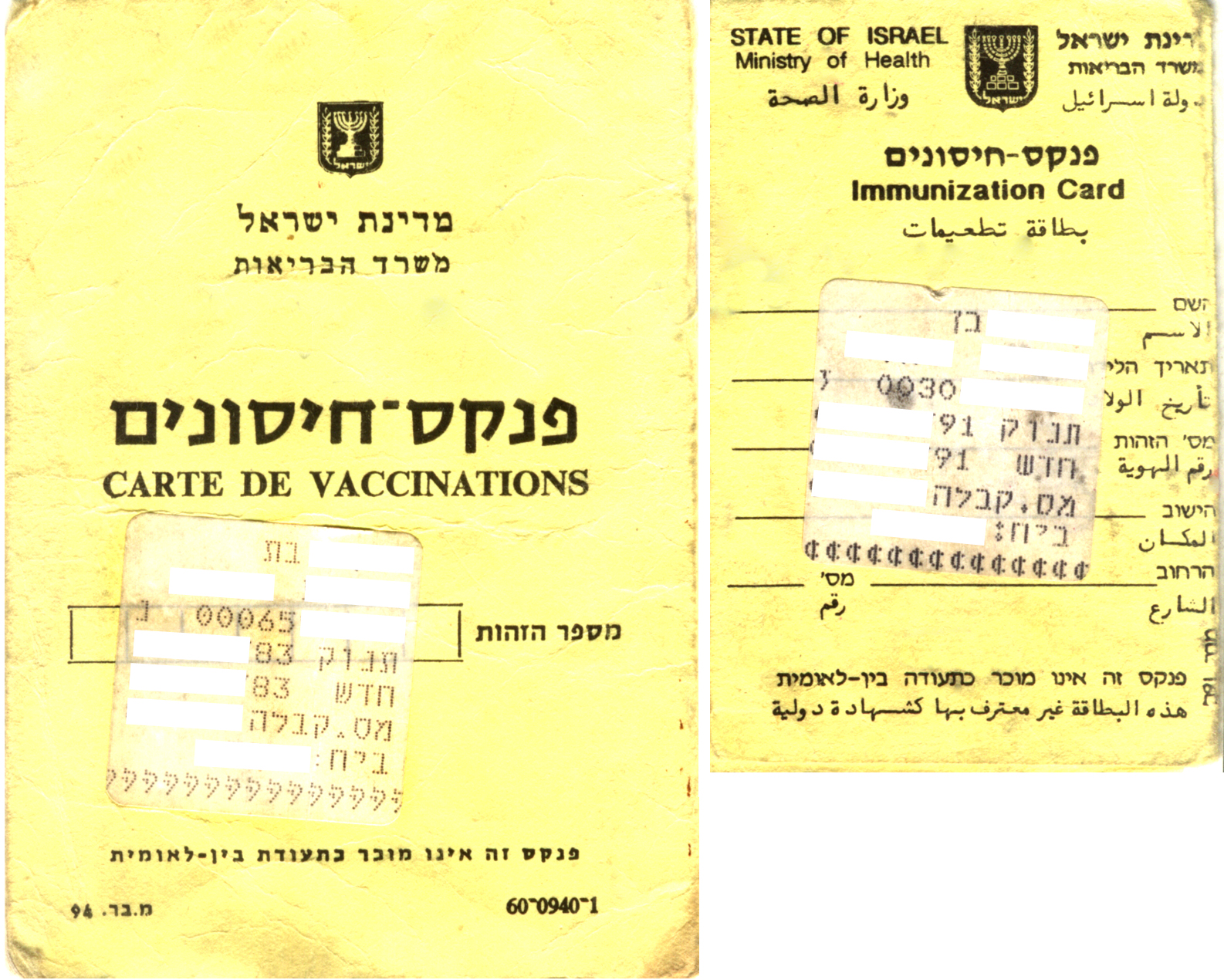
Israeli Immunization Cards. The left one is in Hebrew and French and was printed in 1983. The right one is in Hebrew, Arabic and English and was printed in 1991.

Several laws determine the official status of languages and language policy in Israel. This complicated situation has led to several appeals to the Supreme Court, whose rulings have enforced the current policies of national and local authorities.

On 19 July 2018, the Knesset passed a Basic Law under the title Israel as the Nation-State of the Jewish People, which defines Hebrew as "the State's language" and Arabic as a language with "a special status in the State" (Article 4). The law further says that it should not be interpreted as compromising the status of the Arabic language in practice prior to the enactment of the Basic Law, namely, it preserves the status quo and changes the status of Hebrew and Arabic only nominally.

Before the enactment of this Basic Law, the status of official language in Israel was determined by the 82nd paragraph of the Palestine Order in Council:

All Ordinances, official notices and official forms of the Government and all official notices of local authorities and municipalities in areas to be prescribed by order of the High Commissioner, shall be published in English, Arabic and Hebrew.

This law, like most other laws of Mandatory Palestine, was adopted in the State of Israel, subject to certain amendments published by the Provisional State Council on 19 May 1948. The amendment states that:

Any provision in the law requiring the use of the English language is repealed.

Apart from Hebrew, Arabic and English, the use of Russian dramatically increased with massive arrivals of Jewish immigrants from the former Soviet Union. Today, Russian TV channels and media are widely available alongside Hebrew and Arabic media.

Initially French was used as a diplomatic language in Israel, and was also used alongside Hebrew on official documents such as passports until the 1990s, even though most state officials and civil servants were more fluent in English. However, the Israeli-French alliance unraveled in the runup to the 1967 Six-Day War, leading to decreased use of French. Israeli passports switched from French to English during the 1990s.

== Official language ==
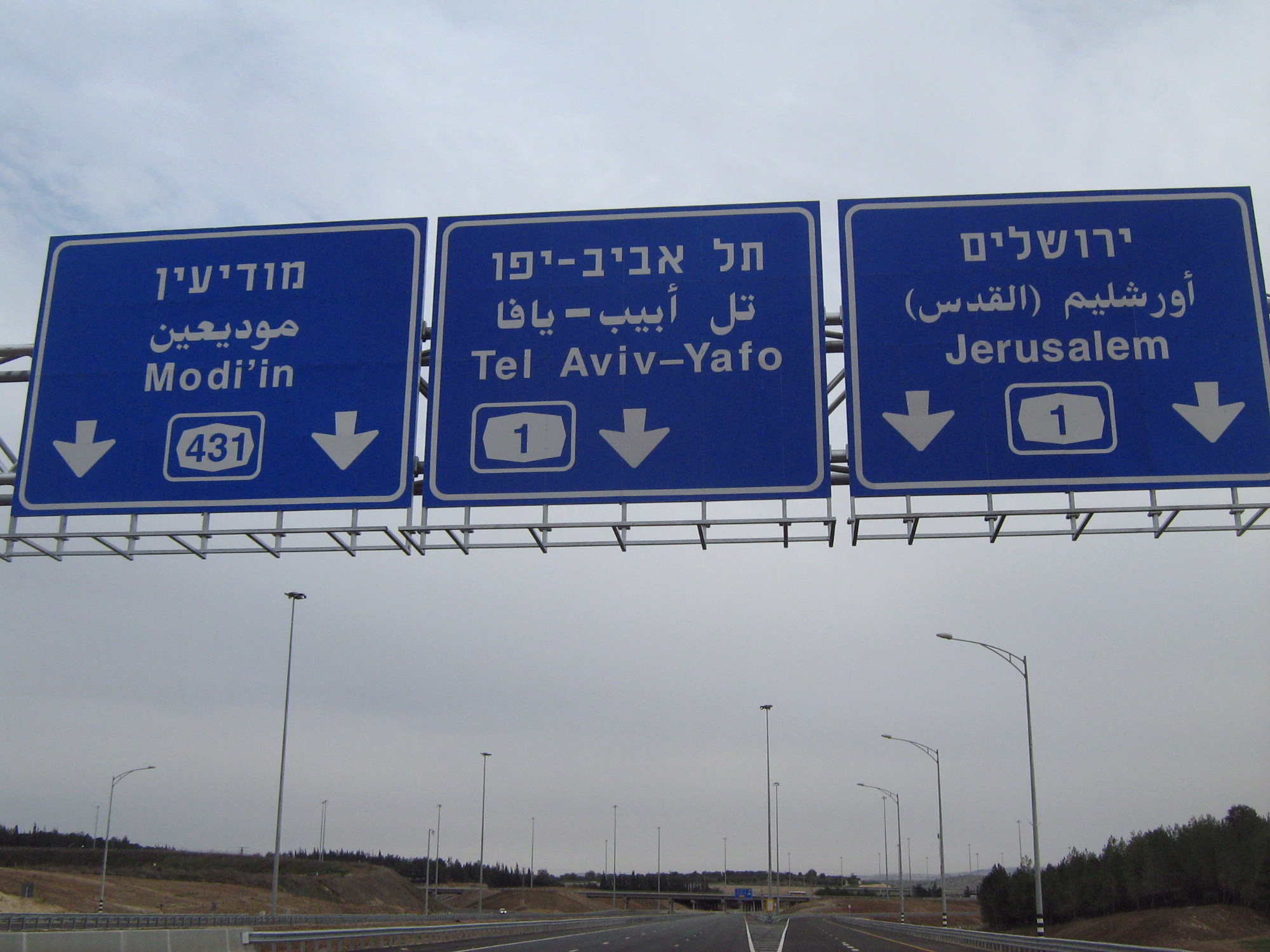
Road signs in Israel in Hebrew, Arabic and English

An Israeli road sign in Hebrew, Arabic, and English. On some road signs (such as the ones above), the Arabic and English are transliterations of the Hebrew place names. On others, the local Arabic or conventional English names are used.

=== Hebrew ===
The British Mandate articles, issued by the Council of the League of Nations in 1922, and the 1922 Palestine Order in Council were the first in modern times to acknowledge Hebrew as an official language of a political entity. This was a significant achievement for the Zionist movement, which sought to establish Hebrew as the national language of the Jewish people and discouraged the use of other Jewish languages, particularly Yiddish. The linguistic dualism between Hebrew and Yiddish was similar to that of Hebrew and Aramaic in ancient times.

The movement for the revival of Hebrew as a spoken language was particularly popular among new Jewish Zionist immigrants who came to Ottoman ruled Mutasarrifate of Jerusalem beginning in the 1880s. Eliezer Ben-Yehuda (born in the Russian Empire) and his followers created the first Hebrew-speaking schools, newspapers, and other Hebrew-language institutions. Max Weinreich notes in his book History of the Yiddish Language, Volume 1, the "very making of Hebrew into a spoken language derives from the will to separate from the Diaspora". After Ben Yehuda's immigration to Israel, and due to the impetus of the Second Aliyah (1905–1914), Hebrew prevailed as the single official and spoken language of the Jewish community of Mandatory Palestine.

When the State of Israel was formed in 1948, the government viewed Hebrew as the de facto official language and initiated a melting pot policy, where every immigrant was required to study Hebrew and often to adopt a Hebrew surname. Use of Yiddish, which was the main competitor prior to World War II, was discouraged, and the number of Yiddish speakers declined as the older generations died out. Yiddish is still often used in Ashkenazi Haredi communities worldwide, and is usually the first language for the members of the Hasidic branches of such communities.

Today, Hebrew is the official language used in government, commerce, court sessions, schools, and universities. It is the language most commonly used in everyday life in Israel. Native Hebrew speakers comprise over 63% of the population. The vast majority of the rest speak Hebrew fluently as a second language. Native-born Israeli Jews are typically native speakers of Hebrew, but a significant minority of Israelis are immigrants who learned Hebrew as a second language. Immigrants who come under the Law of Return are entitled to a free course in an ulpan, or Hebrew language school. Most of them speak fluent Hebrew, but some do not. Most Palestinian citizens of Israel, who comprise a large national minority, and members of other minorities are also fluent in Hebrew. Historically, Hebrew was taught in Arab schools from the third grade onward, but it has been gradually introduced from kindergarten onward starting in September 2015. A Hebrew exam is an essential part of the matriculation exams for students of Israeli schools. The state-affiliated Academy of the Hebrew Language, established in 1953 by a Knesset law, is tasked with researching the Hebrew language and offering standardized rules for the use of the language by the state.

A survey by the Central Bureau of Statistics released in 2013 found that 90% of Israeli Jews were proficient in Hebrew and 70% were highly proficient. It also found that 60% of Israeli Arabs were proficient or highly proficient in Hebrew, while 17% could not read it and 12% could not speak it.

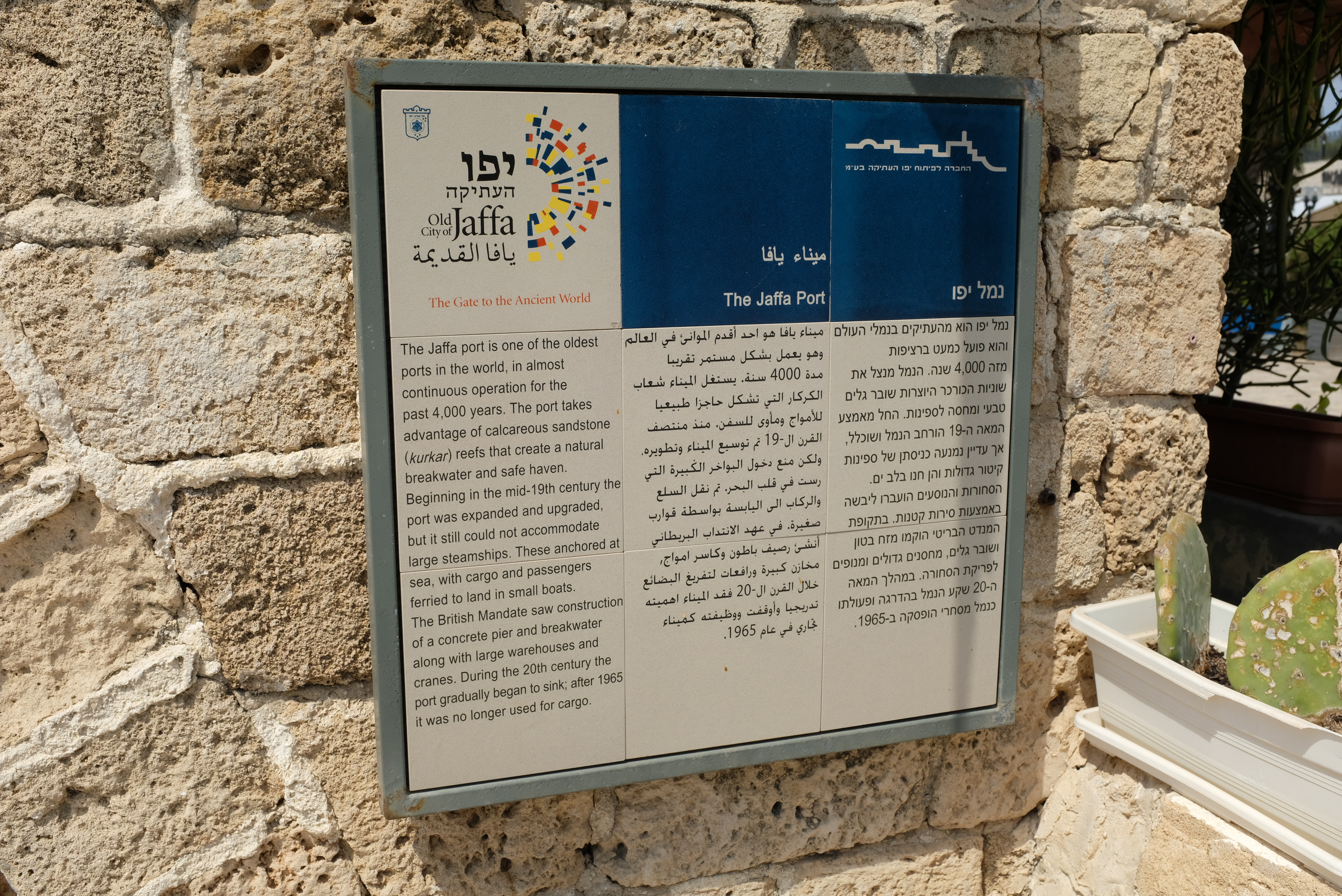
Sign in Jaffa, Israel, which is in English, Arabic, and Hebrew.

== Other languages ==
=== Arabic ===
Literary Arabic, along with Hebrew, has special status under Israeli law. Various spoken dialects are used, and Arabic is the native language among Palestinian citizens of Israel. In 1949, there were 156,000 Arabs in remaining Israel after the start of the Nakba. Most of whom did not speak Hebrew. Today, the figure stands at about 1.6 million. Most are proficient in Hebrew while Arabic remains their primary native language.

In addition, a significant number of Israeli Jews know spoken Arabic, although only a very small number are fully literate in written Arabic. Arabic is the native language of older generations of those Mizrahi Jews who immigrated from Arabic-speaking countries. Arabic lessons are widespread in Hebrew-speaking schools from the seventh through ninth grades. Those who wish to do so may opt to continue their Arabic studies through the twelfth grade and take an Arabic matriculation exam. A 2015 study found that 17% of Israeli Jews can understand Arabic, 10% can speak it fluently, 2.5% can read an article in the language, 1.5% can write a letter in it, and 1% can read a book in it.

For many years, the Israeli authorities were reluctant to use Arabic, except when explicitly ordered by law (for example, in warnings on dangerous chemicals), or when addressing the Arabic-speaking population. This has changed following a November 2000 supreme court ruling which ruled that although second to Hebrew, the use of Arabic should be much more extensive. Since then, all road signs, food labels, and messages published or posted by the government must also be translated into Literary Arabic, unless being issued by the local authority of an exclusively Hebrew-speaking community. As of December 2017, 40% of digital panels on public buses list their routes in both Hebrew and Arabic across the country, and, starting in 2015, Arabic has been increasingly featured in signs along highways and in railway stations.

Arabic was always considered a legitimate language for use in the Knesset alongside Hebrew, but only rarely have Arabic-speaking Knesset members made use of this privilege as while all Arabic-speaking members of the Knesset are fluent in Hebrew, fewer Hebrew-speaking members of the Knesset can understand Arabic.

In March 2007, the Knesset approved a new law calling for the establishment of an Arabic Language Academy similar to the Academy of the Hebrew Language. This institute was established in 2008, and its centre is in Haifa. It is currently headed by Mahmud Ghanayem.

In 2008, a group of Knesset members proposed a bill to remove Arabic's status as an official language, making it an "official secondary language". That bill did not pass.

In 2009, Israel Katz, the transport minister, suggested that signs on all major roads in Israel, East Jerusalem and possibly parts of the West Bank would be amended, replacing English and Arabic place names with straight transliterations of the Hebrew name. Currently most road signs are in all three languages. Nazareth, for example, would become "Natzeret". The Transport Ministry said signs would be replaced gradually as necessary owing to wear and tear. This has been criticized as an attempt to erase the Arabic language and Palestinian culture in Israel. Israel's governmental names' committee unanimously rejected that suggestion in 2011.

=== Russian ===
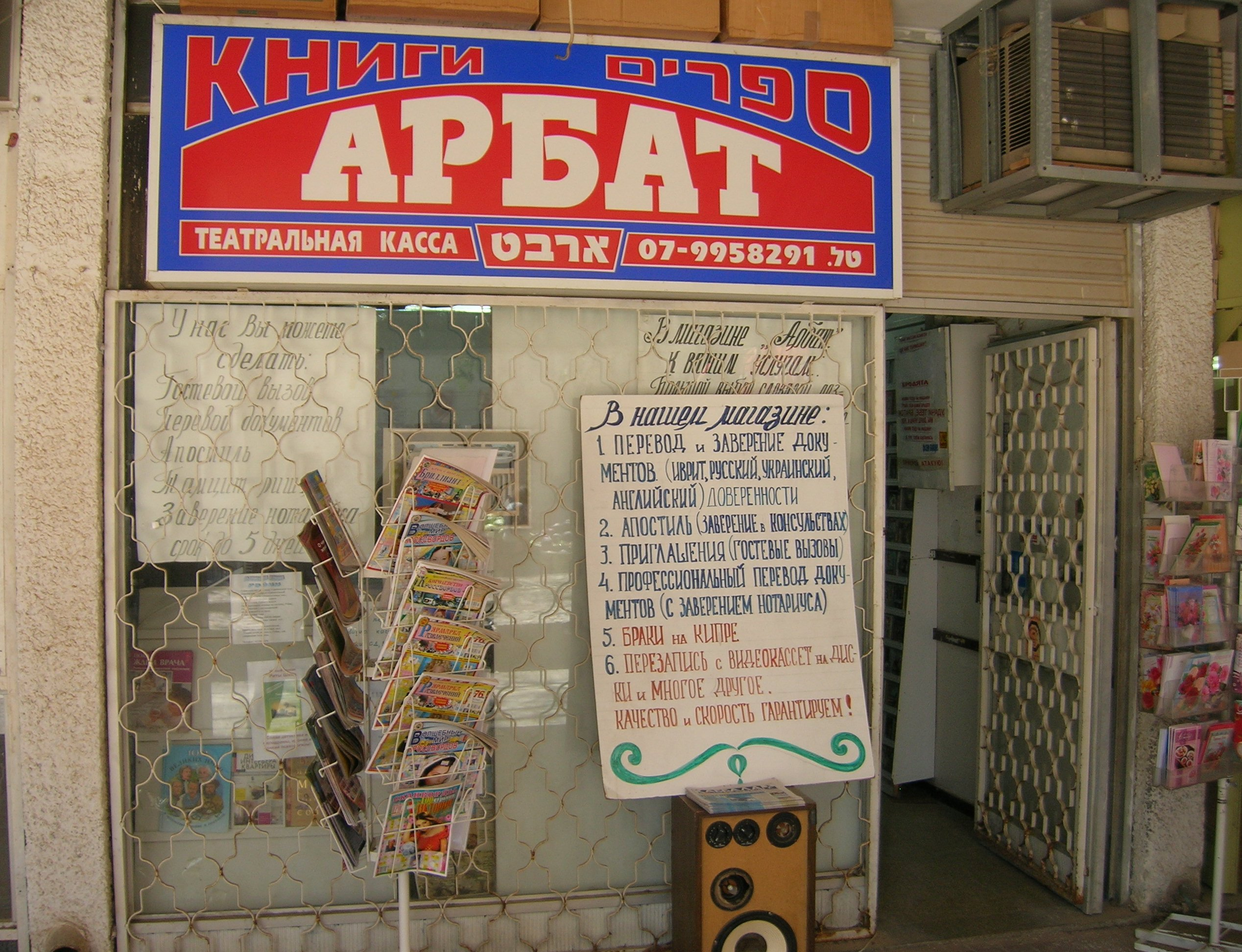
A Russian bookstore in Arad

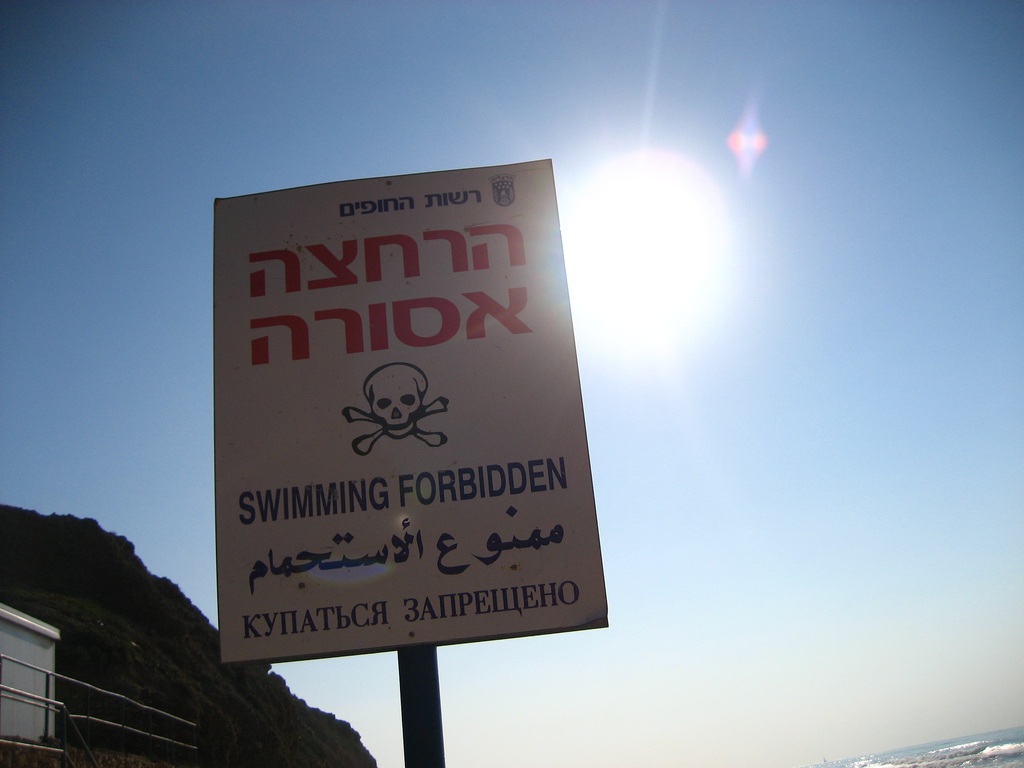
A multilingual sign at a beach, in Hebrew, English, Arabic and Russian, stating "swimming forbidden"

Over 20% of Israelis are fluent in Russian after mass Jewish immigration from the USSR (Russian Jews in Israel) and its successor states in the 1970s, 1990s, and 2000s. The government and businesses often provide both written and verbal information in Russian. There is also an Israeli television broadcast channel in Russian. In addition, some Israeli schools also offer Russian language courses. The children of Russian immigrants to Israel generally pick up Hebrew as their dominant language, but most still speak Russian, and a majority still use Russian instead of Hebrew with family and Russian-speaking friends. As of 2017 there are up to 1.5 million Russian-speaking Israelis.

Most Jewish immigrants from the Soviet Union were highly educated, with almost 45 percent of them having some kind of higher education. Despite the fact that the native language of a significant part of the country's population is Russian, the language occupies a modest role in Israel's education system. Hebrew University started teaching Russian in 1962. In public schools, the first Russian-language classes were opened in the 1970s in large cities. The number of students enrolled in these programs dropped in the 1980s as immigration from the Soviet Union slowed down. In the 1990s, a Russian-language program carried out by local governments called Na'leh 16 included some 1,500 students. In 1997, about 120 schools in Israel taught Russian in one way or another.

Traditionally, Russian speakers read newspapers and listen to radio more often than Hebrew speakers. Nasha strana was the major Russian-newspaper in Israel during the 1970s, when it competed with Tribuna for the immigrant reader. In 1989, there was one daily in Russian. By 1996, there were 6. Since the 2000s, the number of Russian-language newspapers started to decline due to the increasing number of television and online media. Israeli television provides daily translation in Hebrew, Arabic, and Russian. In 2002, the Israeli Russian-speaking commercial Channel 9 was launched. It is also known as Israel Plus. In November 2007, a typical digital package included 45 channels in foreign languages, with 5 in Russian. At 2004 there were four dailies, 11 weeklies, five monthlies and over 50 local newspapers published in Russian in Israel, with a total circulation of about 250,000 during weekends. Daily radio services in Russian are also available throughout Israel.

=== Yiddish ===
Yiddish has been traditionally the language of Ashkenazi Jews in Eastern Europe and the second most widely spoken Jewish language after Hebrew. Currently, it is spoken by approximately 200,000 Israelis, mostly in Hasidic communities. In Hasidic communities, speaking Yiddish is a form of "linguistic protection", separating the community and preventing integration into mainstream Israeli society. Yiddish is a Germanic language that incorporates elements of Hebrew and Slavic languages.

Yiddish saw a decline in its prevalence among the Israeli population in the early statehood of Israel, due to its use being banned in theatres, movies and other cultural activities. It has undergone a cultural revival in recent years. Yiddish is the primary language in some Haredi Ashkenazi communities in Israel. Despite state-sponsored initiatives for preserving Yiddish culture, the number of Yiddish-speaking Israelis is in decline as older generations of Ashkenazi Jews die. In addition, due to greater integration of Haredim, many families in Yiddish-speaking Haredi communities have switched to using primarily Hebrew at home, which has led to the launch preservation campaigns among these communities. In a 2013 survey, about 2% of Israelis over the age of 20 recorded Yiddish as their native language.

=== English ===
In 2018, the director of the Israeli Ministry of Education stated that graduates who lacked English proficiency were effectively "handicapped" in today's economy. An October 2017 report by the Israel Central Bureau of Statistics showed that 38% of Israelis ages 16 to 65 said they lacked basic English skills like speaking, reading, or writing and 13% reported that they do not know any English. English retains a role comparable to that of an official language.

In 1999, the High Court of Justice ruled that English, Arabic and Hebrew were inherited as official languages by Israel, but that English had been removed by the Law and Administration Ordinance of 1948. The Ordinance said:

"Any provision in the law requiring the use of the English language is repealed."

In practice, the use of English decreased dramatically during the state's early years. At first, French was used as a diplomatic language, even though most state officials and civil servants were more fluent in English. During the late 1960s, the Israeli-French alliance was undermined, leading to a stronger Israeli-United States alliance and paving the way for the English language to regain much of its lost status. Today, English is the primary language for international relations and foreign exchange, but it is not sanctioned for use in Knesset debates or in drafting legislation. Some laws from Mandatory Palestine are still formulated in English, and the process of their translation into Hebrew has been gradual. English is required as a second language in schools and universities, for both Hebrew and Arabic-speaking students.

Although English does not have the same status as Hebrew and Arabic do, English proficiency is a core requirement in the public education system and road signs are generally written in English after Hebrew and Arabic. English is taught in public schools from the third grade to high school, and passing an English oral and written test is a prerequisite for receiving a Bagrut (matriculation certificate). Most universities also regard a high level of English as a prerequisite for admission. Exposure to American culture has been massive in Israel in recent decades, and foreign language television shows are generally presented in the original language with Hebrew subtitles rather than dubbed, which means that there is a high level of exposure to English in the media.

Due to immigration from English-speaking countries, a small but significant minority of Israeli Jews are native English speakers. One survey found that about 2% of Israelis spoke English as their native language.

=== Policy towards immigrants' languages ===
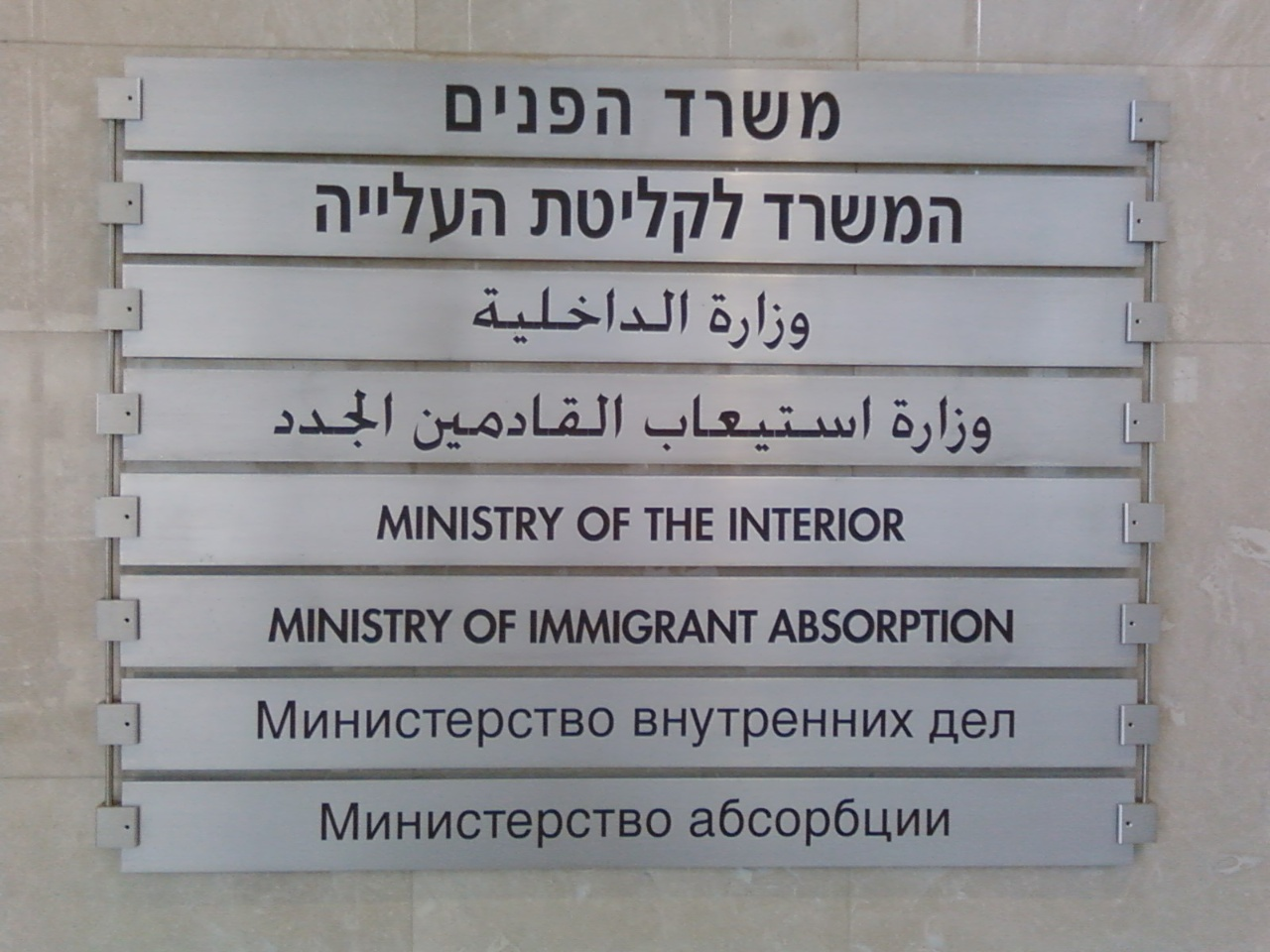
A sign at the Ministry of the Interior/Ministry of Immigrant Absorption at the Government Complex, Haifa. From top to bottom: Hebrew, Arabic, English, and Russian. English and Russian are the most popular unofficial languages in Israel.

The melting pot policy, which governed the Israel language policy in its early days, was gradually neglected during the late 1970s. While in the 1950s Israeli law banned Yiddish-language theaters and forced civil servants to adopt Hebrew surnames, the new policy allowed immigrants to communicate with the authorities in their language of origin and encouraged them to keep their original language and culture.

This new practice has become evident since the early 1990s with massive immigration from the former Soviet Union and the additional immigration from Ethiopia (Ethiopian Jews in Israel). Israeli authorities began to use Russian and Amharic extensively when communicating with these new immigrants. During the 1991 Gulf War, warnings and instructions were issued in at least seven languages. In 1991, a new radio station was erected, called "REKA", which is a Hebrew acronym for "Aliyah Absorption Network". At first, it broadcast exclusively in Russian, also containing programming aimed at teaching Hebrew, which included veteran Israel radio broadcasters recapping news in "easy Hebrew"; some years later, Amharic and Tigrinya time slots were introduced. Just as news in Arabic existed on Arutz 1, news programmes appeared in Russian, Amharic and Tigrinya. Several newspapers and magazines were published in Russian and easy Hebrew with Niqqud. In the early 2000s, the first Russian-language TV channel was created.

=== Other spoken languages ===
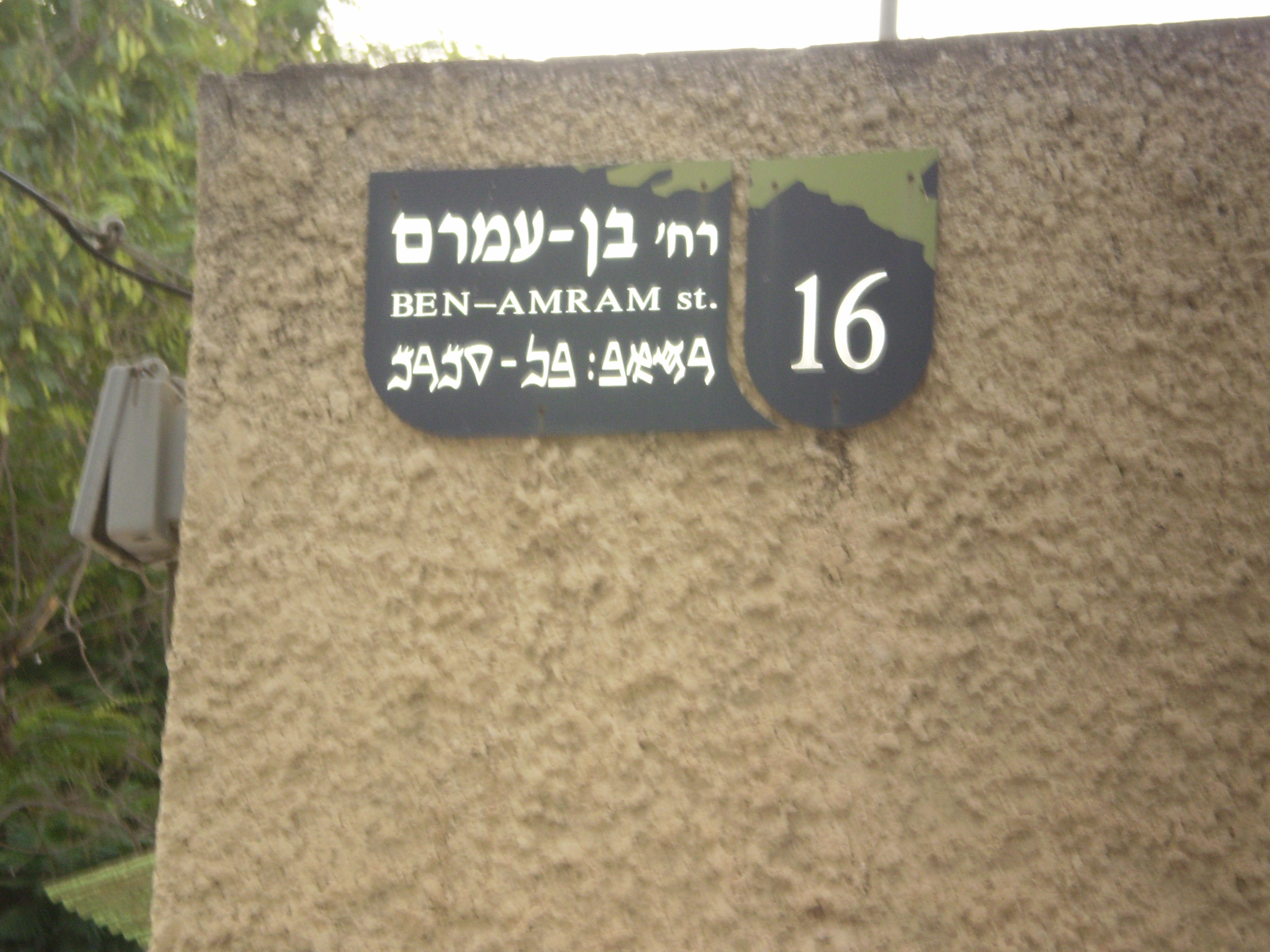
Ben-Amram street in Neve Pinchas, written in Samaritan Hebrew

Many other languages are used by large sectors of the Israeli population, including:

- Romanian: It is estimated that 82,300 first generation and at least (Note: The Israeli Census Bureau only counts as second generation Jews those persons whose father was born aboard, regardless of their mother's origin) 126,200 second generation Romanian Jews lived in Israel by 2012. Additionally, it is estimated that 14,700 Romanian nationals worked in Israel as of 2010 (with or without a work permit). These figures do not include Moldovan-born Jews and Moldovan migrants, which in turn are listed as former Soviet. However, these numbers do not account for actual language speakers but only nationality, as there is no recent data on the number of Romanophones living in Israel.
- German is spoken natively by around 100,000 Israelis. During the mandate period, as well as during the first decades of Israeli statehood, German was one of the primary languages of Jews living there. In 1979, a Goethe Institute branch opened in Tel Aviv. By 2006, increasing numbers of Israelis were studying German, and at the time four Israeli schools offered German as an elective course.
- Amharic is spoken by most of Israel's 130,000 Ethiopian Jews, most of whom arrived in two massive operations transporting tens of thousands of Ethiopian Jews from Ethiopia to Israel in 1984 and 1991, Amharic is often used in government announcements and publications. Amharic is also spoken by the Ethiopian Orthodox Tewahedo Church.
- Georgian/Judaeo-Georgian: Although most Georgian Jewish immigrants can also speak Russian, they converse among themselves in Georgian.
- Ladino: The Sephardi Jewish language and the third most widely spoken Jewish language, Ladino is a variant of medieval Spanish, intermixed with Hebrew and with vocabulary from various other languages where Jews emigrated after being expelled from Spain. It is spoken by many Sephardi Jews. Today there is a state-supported authority for preserving the Ladino culture – La Autoridad Nasionala del Ladino i su Kultura.
- Polish: Polish was spoken by the large number of immigrants from Poland. Today, it is somewhat common in Polish moshavei ovdim (workers' settlements) created during the 1940s and 1950s. There are also several thousand Polish Jews living in Israel who immigrated after the 1968 Polish political crisis; most were born and raised in Poland, speak the language fluently amongst themselves, and have made attempts to impart the language to their children.
- Ukrainian: While most Ukrainian Jews speak Russian, there is still a segment of Ukrainian speakers.
- Adyghe: Spoken by Israeli Circassians in Kfar Kama and Rehaniya and studied as a subject in schools.
- Spanish: Spanish is spoken by olim from the Hispanosphere, mainly from Argentina and Uruguay. Spanish is not restricted to Sephardim, as most Argentine and Uruguayan Jews are actually Ashkenazim. The immense popularity of Latin American telenovelas, broadcast in their original Spanish with Hebrew subtitles since the 1990s, has contributed to a passive understanding of the language among a significant number of Israelis. Additionally, it has fostered the formation of large fan bases for various celebrities, such as Natalia Oreiro, Facundo Arana and Lali Espósito.
- French: According to an assessment by the French Ambassador in 1995, 250,000 to 350,000 Israeli "could be considered" French speakers. An Israeli Jewish French, called "Franbreu" is emerging among the Jews who emigrated from Francophone nations or from other countries where French was considered the "cultural language of the period" in that country. French is spoken by many Moroccan, Algerian, and Tunisian Jews, either as a native or second language of these francized Maghrebi Jews, French is also spoken by the increasing number of new immigrants from France and other French-speaking countries, as well as by foreign workers from French speaking Africa. Also, French is still taught in many Israeli schools and universities and due to immigration from France a small but significant 2% of Israeli Jews are native French speakers. The French embassy's Institut Français supports French studies in Israeli schools. Israel has tried to join La Francophonie, but has been rebuffed by its Arab members. Tel Aviv University is a member of the Agence universitaire de la Francophonie (AUF). Concentrations of French speakers are found in the towns of Netanya and Ashdod.
- Italian and Judaeo-Italian: In addition to being spoken by Italian Jews, Italian is also spoken by many Jews from Libya (a former Italian colony) and immigrants from other former Italian colonies (Eritrea and Somalia) as a primary or second language. As a result of growing demand, Italian may be taken as an optional subject in some schools.
- Hungarian: Hungarian is spoken by approximately 70,000 Hungarian Jews in Israel.
- Turkish: Turkish is spoken by some of the 77,000 Turkish Jews and their families, who immigrated from Turkey in the second half of the 20th century and also by foreign workers. Many of the Turkish speakers in Israel also speak Ladino.
- Persian: Persian is spoken by some of the 135,000 Iranian Jews who immigrated from Iran and their children.
- Kayla and Qwara: These languages are spoken by Ethiopian Jews in addition to Amharic. Kayla appears to be extinct.
- Chinese, Filipino, and Thai: While spoken by a negligible number of Israeli Jews, Chinese, Tagalog, and Thai have made inroads in Israeli society in recent years due to an influx of non-Jewish immigrants from China, the Philippines, and Thailand.
- Marathi: Marathi is the language of Bene Israel – Indian Jews from the Konkan region of the state of Maharashtra in India. They migrated to Israel beginning in 1948, when the State of Israel was established. In 1977, they numbered about 20,000. Concentrations of Marathi speakers are found in the towns of Dimona and Beersheba.
- Malayalam: Judeo-Malayalam is the traditional language of the Cochin Jews (also called Malabar Jews), from the state of Kerala, in South India.
- Judeo-Moroccan Arabic: Judeo-Moroccan Arabic is the native language spoken by the majority of Moroccan Jews that immigrated to Israel from Morocco during the 1950s and 1960s. There is a Judeo-Moroccan Arabic radio program on Israeli radio.
- Bukhori: Bukhori, also known as Judeo-Tajik, is spoken by the Bukharian Jews who immigrated from Central Asia.
- Judeo-Tat: Judeo-Tat (also known as Juhuri) is spoken by the Mountain Jews who immigrated from Russia and Azerbaijan.
- Jewish Neo-Aramaic: Jewish Neo-Aramaic language is the native language spoken by Kurdish Jews that immigrated to Israel from Iraq, Turkey, and Iran during the 1940s and 1950s.
- Greek and Judeo-Greek: Greek is spoken by Greek-Orthodox church and by a number of Greek Jews, such as the Romaniotes, the Constantinopolitan Karaites, and some Greek Sephardim.
- Kuki and Judeo-Zo: spoken by the Bnei Menashe, Indian Jews from Mizoram and Manipur.
- Armenian: spoken by Armenians in Israel.
- Domari: spoken by Doms in Israel.
- Aramaic: spoken by Aramean Israelis. They founded the Israeli Christian Aramaic Association to preserve their Aramaic heritage. The public elementary school in Gush Halav became the country's first to teach Aramaic.

=== Sign languages ===
Israeli Sign Language is the main language amongst deaf Israelis. It comes from Jewish educators of the Deaf from Germany who relocated to start the first school for the deaf in Israel.

Russian Sign Language is used by deaf immigrants from the former Soviet Union.

Several village sign languages are used as well:

- Ghardaia Sign Language, AKA Algerian Jewish Sign Language
- Al-Sayyid Bedouin Sign Language
- Kafr Qasem Sign Language
- Arab El-Naim Sign Language
- Ein Mahel Sign Language
- Abu Kaf Bedouin Sign Language
- Al-Atrash Sign Language

== See also ==
- Demographics of Israel
- Neo-Aramaic languages
