= ABSL =

ABSL may refer to:

- "Adapter, Bus, SCSI-ID, and LUN", a computer term for device addressing
- The Amundsen-Bellingshausen Seas Low, a climatological low-pressure area located over the Pacific sector of the Southern Ocean
- Al-Sayyid Bedouin Sign Language, used by members of a Bedouin community in the Negev desert of southern Israel
- Assistant Beaver Scout Leader, in the Beaver scouts
