= Enga =

Enga may refer to:

- Enga Province, Papua New Guinea
- Enga people, ethnic group located in the highlands of Papua New Guinea
- Enga language, language spoken by Enga people
- Enga Sign Language, used among the Enga
- Vålerenga I.F. Fotball, a Norwegian association football team
