= Orocovis Sign Language =

Indigenous sign language isolate

Orocovis Sign Language (LSOR)
- Lengua de Señas de Orocovis
- Native to: United States
- Region: Puerto Rico
- Ethnicity: Afro–Puerto Ricans
- Native speakers: 25–50 (2021)
- Language family: Language isolate
- Writing system: none

Official status
- Official language in: none

Language codes
- ISO 639-3: –

- Maps of the sign languages of Turtle Island (North America), showing exclusively Francosign languages on the bottom. LSOR is shown on the top map as #6.

Orocovis Sign Language (LSOR; Spanish: Lengua de Señas de Orocovis) is a village sign language native to Orocovis, Puerto Rico. Distinct from both the Puerto Rican dialect of American Sign Language (ASL) and Puerto Rican Sign Language (PRSL), LSOR is a language shared by both deaf and hearing members of the community (like Martha's Vineyard Sign Language). It is spoken by about 25 to 50 mostly Afro-Caribbean families in the inland town. Many in Orocivis are bilingual in PRSL and LSOR.

== Grammar ==
Orocovis Sign Language features several notable grammatical differences to its neighboring dominant languages.

=== Signing space and agreement ===
Like other village sign languages, LSOR signers employ an extended signing space. As such, signers are not restricted to the space in front of themselves: Signers will use extended bodily locations as well as the space behind their body. In addition, there is an extensive use of absolute pointing, a phenomenon seen in many other sign languages, where the signing space location is "absolute" which then is used for a variety of grammatical processes.

As such, absolute pointing can reference an actual location:

DAD 1 HOUSE IX_{bk-ctr} HOUSE
'Long ago, I phoned Ottawa.' (referring to a shop in Ottawa)

It can also indicate where a referent in question is (or was, at some point) located, becoming an abstracted, symbolic element in the signer's speech. In the below two examples, the referent is either no longer alive or has moved locations since their signed location became abstracted:

IX_{frt-lft-up} DEAD MY SIBLING
‘He (over there, at the front-left-up) died, my sibling.’

IX_{lft-ctr} ... FLEW-AWAY_{rgt-up}
‘He (over there, at left-center) flew away (towards right-up).’

LSOR's use of absolute pointing can provide the signer a rich vocabulary for locations that are not visually accessible from the location of the conversation. For example, pointing to a specific place can reference the a subject or topic that is associated with that particular space:

DEAF IX_{bk-ctr} MY SIBLING
‘He (over there, back-center) was deaf, my sibling.’

When subjects are moving, their location indicated by absolute pointing concretizes within the discourse and can be used as a reference point later. For example, the person indicated by IX_{frt-lft-up} is at the front-left-up position across from the signer, but she was moving from one location to another, and soon left the front-left-up position.

IX2 LOOK-AT IX_{frt-lft-up}
‘You look at her [now at the front-left-up position].’

Similarly, the location of each daughter at the point of utterance becomes an absolute location:

HEARING-AID C-C+PUT_{rgt-up} C–C+PUT_{frt-up} C–C+PUT_{frt-lft-up}
‘[They could’ve] fitted hearing aids to her, to her [and] to her.’

=== Aspect ===
Like in American Sign Language, aspect is marked by a reduplication of the sign:

SOW-SOW-SOW
‘(In those times) I was sowing.’

HOE-HOE-HOE
‘[First, . . . then] I hoed the ground, [then . . . ].’

=== Classifiers ===
Also like other sign languages, LSOR makes extensive use of classifiers. They are often used in conjunction with pointed absolute locations.

== See also ==
- American Sign Language
- Puerto Rican Sign Language
