= Bouakako Sign Language =

Deaf sign language of Ivory Coast

- LaSiBo
- Native to: Ivory Coast
- Native speakers: 9 deaf and 15 fluent hearing speakers known (2016)
- Language family: village sign language

Language codes
- ISO 639-3: None (mis)
- Glottolog: lang1336

Bouakako Sign Language or LaSiBo (French: Langue des signes Bouakako) is an emerging village sign language in the village of Bouakako, 6 km (3.7 mi) to the west of the town of Hiré in southern Ivory Coast. LaSiBo has been used by several generations of deaf people, most of whom are related. Many of the hearing community, who speak Yocoboué Dida, know something of the language as well, and some are fluent. The vocabulary is somewhat variable between speakers, suggesting that the language is still quite young. Based on the age of the oldest deaf signer, it is probably at least 50 years old (as of 2016).

LaSiBo is similar to Nanabin Sign Language in Ghana, Mardin Sign Language in Turkey and other young village sign language concentrated among one or a few families.
