= Tembagla language =

Hagen language spoken in Papua New Guinea

Bo-Ung
- Tembagla
- Native to: Papua New Guinea
- Region: Southern Highlands Province
- Native speakers: (41,000 cited 2000 census)
- Language family: Trans–New Guinea: Chimbu–Wahgi; Hagen; Bo-Ung

Language codes
- ISO 639-3: mux
- Glottolog: boun1245

Tembagla, also known as Bo-Ung (Mbo-Ung), is one of the languages spoken in the Southern Highlands province of Papua New Guinea. Geographically the people are Kaugel, but their language appears to be closer to the related Medlpa.

Dialects are Ku Waru, Mara-Gomu, Miyemu (Miyem), and Tembalo (Tembaglo).

== See also ==
- Kailge Sign Language
