= Deafness in Turkey =

In Turkey, deaf and hard of hearing (DHH) individuals are legally supported by frameworks that recognize Turkish Sign Language (TİD) and outline provisions for accessibility, education, and employment. National policies include training for sign language interpreters, accessible education, and protections of civil rights of the community. Technological advancements such as sign language apps and AI-based translation tools have been developed to support TİD. However, limited information is available regarding the implementation of bilingual education and the inclusion of DHH individuals in policy development. While TİD is widely used, Central Taurus and Mardin Sign Languages of shared-signing communities are reported to be endangered due to limited intergenerational transmission, resulting in language shift towards TİD.

== CRPD ==
The United Nations Convention on the Rights of Persons with Disabilities (CRPD) is an international treaty that declares the human rights of DHH people. Turkey ratified the CRPD in 2009. While the CRPD applies to the entire disabled community, the World Federation of the Deaf (WFD) highlights articles that are specific to DHH individuals.

- Sign language rights (Articles 2, 21.b, 21.3, 23.3, and 24.3b)
- Deaf culture and linguistic identity (Article 30.4)
- Bilingual education (Article 24.1, 24.3b, 24.4)
- Lifelong learning (Article 5, 24.5, and 27)
- Accessibility (Article 9 and 21)
- Equal employment opportunities (Article 27)
- Equal participation (Article 5, 12, 20, 23, 24, 29)

=== Turkey's Initial Report ===
The initial country report, although due in 2011, was published in 2015. The General Directorate of Services for Persons with Disabilities and the Elderly (EYHGM) in preparation of this report collected data from roughly 200 institutions including those representing persons with disabilities, human rights centers, those that make policy on disability-related issues, and those providing services to persons with disabilities. In meetings to draft the report, it is stated that representatives of disability organizations argued that rights of persons with disabilities were legally guaranteed, however, steps still needed to be taken to implement these guarantees. In the initial country report, it is not stated if any DHH people were directly consulted. Below is a summary of the content of the report that is most relevant to the DHH community, per the WFD's designated articles of significance.

==== Sign Language Rights ====
Article 21: Recognizes the adoption of Turkish Sign Language through the TDA (Turkish Disability Act) and states that the Turkish Language Society was tasked with establishing a "national sign language system," although the methods of doing so are not mentioned.

Article 24: Since the 2010-11 school year, course books that are accessible to students with "hearing disabilities" and their instructors have been made available free of charge. Since 1983, special education instructors have been trained by university programs to directly education students with "hearing disabilities". The Turkish Sign Language dictionary is stated to have been established and peer-reviewed, and training courses for trainers of TİD to have been organized. It is also stated that there must be at least one sign language interpreter provided by ASPB to each province, "ensuring that people with hearing disabilities benefit from all public services in equal terms with other citizens."

==== Deaf Culture and Linguistic Identity ====
Article 30: This article states that cultural life, recreation, leisure and sport is to be made accessible to people with disabilities, but makes no acknowledgment to promoting deaf culture specifically, nor linguistic identity.

==== Bilingual Education ====
Article 24: See summary of Article 24 under the "Sign Language Rights" section above.

==== Lifelong Learning ====
Article 27: Vocational trainings are to be provided to persons with disabilities in inclusive environments, and civil servant examinations are to provide accommodations. However, there is no mention of how these are to be made inclusive, nor is there mention of accommodations to be made for the DHH community specifically. This article also highlights the rights that the disabled community have as employees, which are protected under labor laws.

==== Accessibility ====
Article 9: This article summarizes the legislations that have been passed to make buildings, public spaces, and transportation accessible to persons with disabilities. The only mention of effort to promote accessibility for the DHH community specifically is that alongside efforts to make the Grand National Assembly of Turkey more accessible for visitors, sign language education was stated to have been given to the Visitors Admission and Guidance Unit.

Article 21: See summary of Article 21 under the "Sign Language Rights" section above.

==== Equal Employment Opportunities ====
Article 27: See summary of Article 27 under the "Lifelong Learning" section above.

==== Equal Participation ====
Article 5: This article outlines Turkey's laws on equality and discrimination; the "state shall not discriminate against PwDs and fighting against discrimination shall form the basic principle of policies towards PwDs."

Article 12: In 2010 and amendment was made to the constitution to include "disabled people" in Article 10 which states all that are equal before the law.

Article 20: Entrance and guidance through buildings and mass transportation is to be made audio-visually accessible, including emergency warning systems. Since 2008, "Fair of Barrier Free Life" has existed as a platform for companies providing services and products for those with special needs or disabilities.

Article 23: The only limitations to marriage in relation to the DHH community are if the person does not have the ability to discern, they are not legally allowed to marry. Sterilization of the disabled without consent is punishable by law. The government provides socio-economic support for parents with disabilities, as well as parents of children with disabilities—the extent of this support is not outlined.

Article 24: See summary of Article 24 under the "Sign Language Rights" section above.

Article 29: The Turkish Constitution ensures that all Turkish citizens over the age of 18 have the right to vote, be elected, and participate in political and public life. It is acknowledge that private television stations and Turkish Radio and Television (TRT) report electoral process and news in sign language, but there is no mention of federal implementation of accessible broadcasting.

== Sign languages ==
As of February 19, 2025, the sign languages listed under Turkey in Ethnologe include Turkish Sign Language (TİD) and Mardin Sign Language (MarSL). Although not reported in Ethnologe, Central Taurus Sign Language (CTSL) has also been identified as a native sign language of Turkey.

=== Central Taurus Sign Language (CTSL) ===
CTSL is used by a shared-signing community consisting of three small villages in the Taurus Mountains of Southern Turkey. It is estimated that the language arose spontaneously over the past 50 years in the instance of language deprivation of DHH individuals in this region. As of January 2021, the language has about 25 deaf signers, and approximately 80 fluent Turkish speakers who have a certain degree of fluency in CTSL.

=== Mardin Sign Language (MarSL) ===
MarSL of the Mardin Province, which is used by 40 individuals of the Dilsiz family, which is a shared-signing community.

=== Turkish Sign Language (TİD) ===
TİD is a deaf community sign language, and is used by an estimated 166,000-333,000 deaf signers scattered across Turkey. There is dialectal variation between schools, due to it not being implemented in the classroom, but is intelligible by its users throughout the country.

== Language preservation, endangerment, and revitalization ==
=== Central Taurus Sign Language (CTSL) ===
Since CTSL is a relatively newer language, and currently being studied, it does not have an EGIDS level in Ethnologue. However, the language has been described by researchers as "on the edge of conventionalization." It has been documented that there is substantial variation in the vocabulary for objects and food items, whereas some vocabulary have relatively conventionalized sign. As the language is being studied and documented in its emergent stages of development, researchers are working to document the use of CTSL in effort to learn more about the language and its development. Documentation of the language is essential for its preservation, particularly since it may be at risk of endangerment if its usage is not continued in future generations.

=== Mardin Sign Language (MarSL) ===
MarSL has the EGIDS status of 8b or "nearly-extinct" in Ethnologe, which indicates that "the only remaining users of the language are members of the grandparent generation or older who have little opportunity to use the language". The majority of DHH individuals of this shared-signing community have moved away from Mardin, and have assimilated with the national Turkish Deaf community causing a language shift towards Turkish Sign Language.

=== Turkish Sign Language (TİD) ===
TİD has the EGIDS status of 6a or "vigorous" in Ethnologe, which indicates that "the language is used for face-to-face communication by all generations and the situation is sustainable". As mentioned in the CRPD section, TİD is recognized as an official language of the country. Sign language services in Turkey are mostly found to serve users of TİD, as it is the predominant sign language of the region. In 2017 the Ministry of Family, Labor and Social Services made the Turkish Sign Language Dictionary available online. The dictionary was compiled from 116 TİD native language users from 26 provinces of Turkey. There are varying degrees of native competence in TİD, due to varying levels of access to sign language for DHH individuals across the nation. Another aspect that affects the documentation of TİD, is that a majority of researchers are not native speakers, which may lead to inaccuracies in data analysis. While there are possible hinderances in language documentation, there have been many efforts to preserve the language, on a local scale amongst the DHH and hearing communities, as well as at an international level. The Turkish Sign Language Dictionary alone has been translated into English, and been accessed 2.7 million times since 2017 from 86 different countries. In addition to efforts to promote the usage of TİD, there have been initiatives to increase visibility of Turkish Sign Language. The Dem Association (Dem Derneği) works to disseminate TİD through digital trainings of learning TİD, as well as working to raise awareness on subjects such as employment of the DHH as well as closed captioning availability.

== Universal newborn hearing screening ==
Since the end of 2003, Turkey has implemented a National Newborn Hearing Screening Program. As of 2020, it has been reported that 98% of newborns are screened through this program, with 5.1% of those screen referred for diagnostic follow-up; there is no data on what percentage are lost-to-follow-up. Per 1,000 babies, 3 are confirmed to have permanent childhood hearing loss. There is no data on the average age at which this diagnosis is provided for babies screened as infants, versus those that were not screened.

== Early intervention ==
As of 2020 in Turkey the early intervention approaches include hearing aids, bone conduction devices, and cochlear implants. Per the national protocol, intervention should be implemented before the age of 6 months. Infants that demonstrate hearing loss are fitted with hearing aids from less than 6 months of age or older. The criteria to be met for hearing aid fitting is unilateral or bilateral sensorineural hearing loss of 25 dB HL or 30 dB eHL or worse. Cochlear implants are made available at the age of 9–10 months, as this is determined to be the age in which the infant is mature enough to undergo MRI and CT imaging. There is no data to show how many children per year are fitted with hearing aids or cochlear implants in Turkey. Most deaf children in Turkey have access to TİD after the age of 6, at the time of entrance into primary school.
