= Bura Sign Language =

Village sign language of Nigeria

- Native to: Nigeria
- Region: 40 km (25 mi) SE of Biu
- Ethnicity: Bura people
- Language family: Village sign language, West African gestural area

Language codes
- ISO 639-3: None (mis)
- Glottolog: bura1295

Bura Sign Language is a village sign language used by the Bura people around the village of Kukurpu, 40 kilometres (25 miles) south-east of Biu, Nigeria, an area with a high degree of congenital deafness. What little is known about it is due to a brief visit and a videotape by Robert Blench in 2003. It is "likely ... quite independent" from other, better-known sign languages such as Nigerian Sign Language, since none of the signers have been to school and the area where it is used is rather remote.

Bura SL has the lax hand shapes and large sign space characteristic of indigenous West African sign languages. Many of the words are similar or identical to those of Adamorobe Sign Language and Nanabin Sign Language of Ghana, and appear to be based on the gestures common to the hearing population across West Africa. These involve conventionalized metaphors such as 'sweat' for "work" and 'sleep' for "next day".

== See also ==
- Mofu-Gudur language, spoken by a hearing population in a neighbouring region of Cameroon who use an estimated 1,500 conventionalized gestures.

== Bibliography ==
- Blench, Roger; Nyst, Victoria (30 November 2003). "An unreported African sign language for the deaf among the Bura in Northeast Nigeria" (PDF). OGMIOS Newsletter. No. 2.10/22. ISSN 1471-0382.
