= Mount Avejaha Sign Language =

Village sign language of Papua New Guinea

Mount Avejaha Sign
- Native to: Papua New Guinea
- Region: Oro Province
- Language family: village sign

Language codes
- ISO 639-3: None (mis)
- Glottolog: moun1255

Mount Avejaha Sign Language is a village sign language of Papua New Guinea. It is spoken in a remote village with many deaf children in the foothills of Mount Avejaha, in Oro Province. It is dissimilar from other village sign languages in New Guinea. The deaf are well integrated into the community.
