= Carhuahuaran Sign Language =

Family sign language of Peru

Carhuahuaran Sign
- Native to: Peru
- Region: Carhuahuaran
- Language family: family sign

Language codes
- ISO 639-3: None (mis)
- Glottolog: None

Carhuahuaran Sign Language is a multigenerational family sign language of the Quechua-speaking region of Peru.
