= Rossel Island Sign Language =

Sign language of Papua New Guinea

- Native to: Papua New Guinea
- Region: Rossel Island
- Language family: village sign

Language codes
- ISO 639-3: None (mis)
- Glottolog: None

Rossel Island Sign Language is a village sign language of Rossel Island, Papua New Guinea reported by Stephen Levinson. He reports that,

On Rossel Island there is ... a strand of hereditary deafness, where a number of families have three generations or more of deaf individuals. Not only these individuals, but also the hearing members of the family and indeed all members of the villages where they live have developed a sign language for effective communication. This system ... remains to be scientifically researched. My initial investigations of one such family with three deaf adult children show that the sign system is capable of conveying quite abstract messages; for example, about events in the future, things witnessed in the past, or hopes and desires in the present. By virtue of the developed sign system, the deaf members of this family are fully integrated members of the village community. Two of them have married in the traditional way, involving complex exchanges of shell money between kin, and have children, some of whom are deaf, so the sign system will have a future utility, and is in effect a strand of cultural tradition in the making.
