= Central Taurus Sign Language =

Deaf sign language of Turkey

Central Taurus Sign
- Orta Toroslar İşaret Dili
- Native to: Turkey
- Region: Taurus Mountains
- Native speakers: Several dozen (no date)
- Language family: Language isolate

Language codes
- ISO 639-3: –
- Glottolog: cent2319

Central Taurus Sign Language (CTSL; Turkish: Orta Toroslar İşaret Dili) is a village sign language of Turkey. It is spoken in three villages in the central Taurus Mountains. It was brought to the world's attention by Rabia Ergin, who was exposed to it growing up.

== See also ==
- Deafness in Türkiye
