= South Rupununi Sign Language =

Sign language of Guyana and Brazil

- Native to: Guyana, Brazil
- Region: seven-plus villages in the Rupununi savannah
- Ethnicity: Wapishana
- Language family: village sign

Language codes
- ISO 639-3: None (mis)
- Glottolog: sout3305

South Rupununi Sign Language is an indigenous village sign language used in at least seven Wapishana villages with a high degree of congenital deafness. The villages are located south of the town of Lethem in the Rupununi savannah of Guyana and Brazil.
