= Leading Tickles Sign Language =

- LTSL
- Native to: Canada
- Region: Leading Tickles, Newfoundland
- Native speakers: no deaf signers; a few hearing people still remember it
- Language family: village sign

Language codes
- ISO 639-3: (lkt is proposed)
- Glottolog: None

Leading Tickles Sign Language is a village sign language of the fishing village of Leading Tickles, Newfoundland. The earliest remembered deaf people in the community were born in 1888; the last deaf signer, Ivan Rowsell, who was the only deaf person of his generation, died in 2019. It is still remembered by some of his hearing contemporaries, who As of 2026 are in the 60s, and his two sons, who are in their 30s. Comparison shows very low similarity to ASL or to Maritime Sign Language.

== See also ==
- Maritime Sign Language
