= Al-Sayyid Bedouin Sign Language =

Sign language local to Israel's al-Sayyid Bedouin village

- لغة الإشارة لعشيرة السيد (Arabic); Lughat il-Ishārah il-Ashīrat al-Sayyid
- Native to: Israel
- Region: Negev
- Native speakers: 120–150 deaf (2008); Also used by many of the 3,500 hearing people of the village. Recognized as the local second language.
- Language family: village sign (language isolate)

Language codes
- ISO 639-3: syy
- Glottolog: alsa1242
- ELP: Al-Sayyid Bedouin Sign Language

Al-Sayyid Bedouin Sign Language (ABSL) (Arabic: لغة الإشارة لعشيرة السيد) is a village sign language used by about 150 deaf and many hearing members of the al-Sayyid Bedouin tribe in the Negev desert in southern Israel.

As deafness is so frequent (4% of the village's population is deaf, compared to 0.1% in the United States) and deaf and hearing people share a language, deaf people are not stigmatised in this community and marriage between deaf and hearing people is common.

ABSL grammar developed quickly, with the signing of each generation becoming more complex than the last. Even though no evidence of phonological structure was found throughout the community, it seems to be emerging within individual families.

== History ==
In 2004, the Al-Sayyid community numbered around 3,000, most of whom trace their ancestry to the time the village was founded, in the mid-19th century, by a local woman and an Egyptian man. Two of this founding couple's five sons carried a gene for nonsyndromic, genetically recessive, profound pre-lingual neurosensory deafness. The descendants of the founding couple often married their cousins owing to the tribe's rejection by its neighbours for being "foreign fellahin". The gene became homozygous in several members of the family.

Four deaf siblings were born into the community approximately 75 years after its founding. Deafness spread to other families in the following two generations; in 2011 there were about 120–150 deaf individuals in the community. This unique set of circumstances led to a sociolinguistic environment not often found elsewhere. The deaf individuals were not only accepted into the greater community, but the resulting sign language was being used by a significant proportion of hearing people in the community as well. Additionally, Al-Sayyid Bedouin Sign Language is being passed down from generation to generation in a natural social setting. There is no separate deaf culture or politics.

ABSL was first studied in the late 1990s by anthropologist Shifra Kisch and came to worldwide attention in February 2005 when an international group of researchers published a study of the language in the Proceedings of the National Academy of Sciences. The spontaneous emergence of the language in the last 70 years and the development of a complex grammar in near-isolation are of particular interest to linguists for the insights it provides into the birth of human language.

The community was isolated from the outside not by geography, but by social stigma. Contact with the outside world is growing as pupils are exposed to Israeli Sign Language and Jordanian Sign Language in schools and community members are marrying outside the community.

== Linguistics ==
Scholars study ABSL because, as deaf people in Al-Sayyid cannot hear Arabic or Hebrew and they have not been exposed to any other sign languages, ABSL is a brand new language, uninfluenced by any other. ABSL is in its early stages, so researchers are observing the language as it develops.

=== Syntax ===
ABSL consistently shows subject–object–verb (SOV) word order (e.g., "woman child feed") and head-modifier order. SVO order is prominent only when the object is a pronoun. This word order is marked contrast to the dialect of Arabic spoken by hearing members of the community (SVO) as well as Hebrew (SVO), classical Arabic (VSO) and the predominant sign languages in the region, Israeli Sign Language and Jordanian Sign Language.

ABSL has a tendency to limit predicates to containing one animate argument. Events involving multiple animate referents are therefore often conveyed through the use of multiple clauses as seen below.

GIRL STAND; MAN BALL THROW; GIRL CATCH
The man throws the ball to the girl.

ABSL is seen as evidence for the human tendency to construct communication along grammatical lines. Researchers have remarked on the speed with which a grammar emerged, with the SOV word-order emerging with the first generation of signers, as well as the continuing rapid development of the language: the third generation is signing twice as fast as the first and is using longer sentences. ABSL does not contain "agreeing" verbs as most known sign languages do.

Few syntactic markers such as complementizers, signs to signal conditionals or structures to mark questions have been found. These functions are instead expressed through the use of prosodic cues to designate when a clause starts or ends or in order to link them together. For example, conditional and when-clauses are marked by raising the eyebrows and tilting the head forward.

=== Phonology ===
ABSL has not been found to have a fully fledged phonology. This can be seen in the absence of duality of patterning, which means signs in ABSL cannot be analyzed as being composed of smaller, meaningless units. Other features common of phonologies, such as signs differing in single feature or rigid constraints on well-formed signs were also not found. Sign features that often contrast in established sign languages, such as where the sign is articulated or the orientation of the hand do not seem relevant. Mouthing, the visual depictions of spoken words with the mouth, is not used. It seemed that the ABSL speakers were "aiming for an iconic and holistic prototype" when producing a sign rather than adhering to strictly defined features, which is what one would expect from a language with a phonology.

The form of a given sign varies considerably throughout the community and is understood by others through iconicity. However, within households that have fluent deaf or hearing signers the signs have a much more conventionalized agreed-upon form. Certain phonological processes, such as assimilation of handshape within a compound, have also been observed within families. These types of households might eventually give rise to the type of phonology found in more established sign languages.

=== Lexicon ===
New signs are often creating through compounding, whereby two noun signs are combined. One method of compounding includes the addition of what appears to be an affix to the base sign to indicate its length. This length affix cannot be used in isolation and is produced by touching the wrist with the non-dominant hand at different points to indicate the relative length of the object in question. The dominant hand meanwhile indicates its thickness through the extension of more or less fingers. For example, the word 'pencil' is translated with the compound 'WRITE+LONG-THIN-OBJECT' by first performing the sign for WRITE, then extending the index finger to represent the pencil and having the other hand represent its relative length. This compound also undergoes handshape assimilation, whereby both hands take on the same handshape. This could be considered as the beginnings of a phonology.

Some signs have been found to not iconically represent the concept in question. For example, the sign for "man" is formed by the curling of the finger in the shape of a moustache although Bedouin men no longer wear them.

== See also ==
- Adamorobe Sign Language
- Martha's Vineyard Sign Language
- Nicaraguan Sign Language
- Language acquisition device
