= Enga Sign Language =

Sign language among the Tato Enga people

- Native to: Papua New Guinea
- Region: Upper Lagaip Valley, Enga Province
- Ethnicity: Tato Enga
- Language family: village sign language?

Language codes
- ISO 639-3: None (mis)
- Glottolog: enga1253

Enga Sign Language is an apparent village sign language among the Tato Enga people in Enga province, Papua New Guinea. It was reported in 1980 in three articles by Adam Kendon, based on ethnographic films of three signers (one deaf, two hearing) in the upper valley of the Lagaip River, but with reports of wider use in the surrounding region. Its current status is unknown, as no more recent information is available.
