= Sinasina Sign Language =

Village sign language of Papua New Guinea

- Native to: Papua New Guinea
- Region: Sinasina, Chimbu Province
- Native speakers: 5 deaf (2019); 25 to 50 hearing
- Language family: village sign

Language codes
- ISO 639-3: None (mis)
- Glottolog: sina1273

Sinasian Sign Language (SSSL) is a village sign language of the Sinasina valley in Chimbu Province, Papua New Guinea. This language is used by approximately 3 deaf and 50 hearing individuals, including members of the Kere community. SSSL was first encountered and reported by linguist Samantha Rarrick in 2016. Documentation efforts are ongoing.

Sinasina Sign Language may have lexical similarities with another village sign language in the region, Kailge Sign Language, but its genetic affiliation has yet to be established.

== See also ==
- Sinasina language
