= Bribri Sign Language =

Deaf sign language in Costa Rica

- Native to: Costa Rica
- Extinct: 1991
- Language family: village sign

Language codes
- ISO 639-3: rib
- Glottolog: brib1244
- ELP: Bribri Sign Language

Bribri Sign Language was a village sign language of an indigenous Bribri community in southern Costa Rica. It is unrelated to Costa Rican Sign Language.
