= Kailge Sign Language =

Village sign language of Papua New Guinea

- Native to: Papua New Guinea
- Region: Kailge, Western Highlands Province
- Language family: village sign

Language codes
- ISO 639-3: None (mis)
- Glottolog: kail1256

Kailge Sign Language is a well-developed village sign language of Western Highlands Province, Papua New Guinea. It is spoken over a wide region of small hamlets around the town of Kailge, as well as in Kailge itself, in a Ku Waru–speaking region. It might be characterized as a network of homesign rather than as a single coherent language. Its use of signing space is more similar to that of deaf-community sign languages than that of many village sign languages shared with the hearing community.

KSL has lexical similarities with another village sign language in the region, Sinasina Sign Language.
