= Angami Naga Sign Language =

Extinct village sign language of India

Naga Sign Language
- Native to: India
- Region: Naga Hills
- Extinct: Last reported from 1921
- Language family: Village sign

Language codes
- ISO 639-3: None (mis)
- Glottolog: anga1315

Naga Hills Sign Language was a village sign language of Nagaland, India used in the early 20th century, when a high incidence of deafness was observed among communities of the Naga hills. The sign language was used by both deaf and hearing members of the community. It was last reported in 1921.

Ethnologist and political officer John Henry Hutton wrote:

"As one might expect ... of men without the art of writing, the language of signs has reached a high state of development... To judge how highly developed is this power of communicating by signs, etc., it is necessary only to experience a Naga interpreter's translation of a story or a request told to him in sign language by a dumb man. ... Indeed the writer has known a dumb man make a long and detailed complaint of an assault in which nothing was missing except proper names, and even these were eventually identified by means of the dumb man's description of his assailants' dress and personal appearance."
