= Chatino Sign Language =

Family sign language of Oaxaca, Mexico

- Cha'ya'
- Native to: Mexico
- Region: Oaxaca
- Ethnicity: Chatino
- Native speakers: 11 deaf in San Juan Quiahije (2015 survey) also used by some hearing people
- Language family: family sign

Language codes
- ISO 639-3: None (mis)
- Glottolog: chat1269
- Various sign languages of Turtle Island (North America), excluding Francosign languages. Cha'ya' is labelled in black as #5.

San Juan Quiahije Chatino Sign Language (Spanish: Lengua de señas chatina de San Juan Quiahije, also known as Cha'ya') is an emerging village sign language of the indigenous Chatino villages of San Juan Quiahije and Cieneguilla in Oaxaca, Mexico, used by both the deaf and some of the hearing population. It is apparently unrelated to Mexican Sign Language. As of 2014, there is a National Science Foundation-funded study and also a National Institutes of Health-funded study of the development of this language.

Non-signing hearing people in the village use various gestures for negation when speaking, and these are retained in Chatino Sign Language. The variability of these signs may be due to the small size of the deaf population in comparison to the number of hearing people who use them as co-speech gestures.
