= Majena language =

Extinct unclassified language of Bolivia

Majena
- (unattested)
- Native to: Bolivia
- Region: Llanos de Mojos
- Ethnicity: Ticomeri
- Extinct: by 1805
- Language family: Unattested

Language codes
- ISO 639-3: None (mis)
- Glottolog: None

Majena, also known as Majiena or Maxiena, is an unattested language, now-extinct language, originally spoken by the purported Ticomeri people of the Llanos de Mojos plains in northwestern Bolivia. Nothing is known about the language itself, but sources state that it was unintelligible to speakers of the nearby Arawakan languages Moxo and Baure (the term "Ticomeri" is a Moxo exonym meaning "other-language") and possibly unrelated to any languages of the area.

Speakers of the language were identified in the mission settlement of San Borja in the eighteenth century. There is some confusion between the Majena-speaking Ticomeri and another group, also known as "Ticomeri", who spoke a divergent dialect of Moxo. Whether the two groups were related (i.e. whether the Ticomeri had abandoned Majena and acquired Moxo) is unknowable, since both were apparently extinct by 1805.

== Sources ==
- Hervás y Panduro, Lorenzo (1805). Catálogo de las lenguas de las naciones conocidas, y numeracion, division, y clases de estas segun la diversidad de sus idiomas y dialectos: Lenguas y naciones americanas. Madrid: Administracion del Real Arbitrio de Beneficencia.
- Métraux, Alfred (1942). The Native Tribes of Eastern Bolivia and Western Mato Grosso (PDF). Washington: Smithsonian Institution.
