= Alipur Sign Language =

Village sign language of India

Deaf Community of Alipur
- Native to: India
- Region: Karnataka
- Native speakers: 150–250 (2012)
- Language family: village sign

Language codes
- ISO 639-3: None (mis)
- Glottolog: alip1234
- ELP: Alipur Sign Language

Alipur Sign Language (Kannada: ಅಲಿಪುರ ಸಂಕೇತ ಭಾಷೆ, romanized: Alipura Saṅkēta Bhāṣe) is a village sign language of India. It is spoken in the town of Alipur, Karnataka, a Shia Muslim enclave with a high degree of congenital deafness. There are between 150 and 250 deaf people in Alipur, and there are approximately 10,000 hearing people speaking the language on a population of 26,000 (in 2015). The language has no official status and deaf children receive no formal education. This fact plus the increasing influence of the Indian Sign Language threaten the survival of Alipur Sign Language (or APSL). Sibaji Panda was the first person to officially document the language in 2012.

During his study, Panda found out that the proportion of deaf population in Alipur was of approximately 0.75%, against 0.41% on national average (data from the 2011 census).

The deaf community of Alipur helped Panda in his researches, particularly Mr. Fazil Raza, a 53 year old former gram panchayat chief, who helped set up the Alipur Unity Society for the Deaf. Mr. Fazil Raza helped with translation from English to the sign language, conducted survey with the help of other members of the community, and served as an informator for the documentation of the language.

Endogamous marriages in the town have led to this large population of deaf, but a deaf man cannot marry a deaf woman. Since there are no public records in the town, it is difficult to establish the veracity of this information.

The sign language is used by many hearing people as well, with level of fluency that greatly varies.

The language has a variety of ways to express numbers, using additions and subtractions to express numbers with high complexity. Mouth movements can be added to express bigger numbers.

The majority of inhabitants in the town are Shia Muslim. The Shia Muslim population descend from Bijapur after the down fall of Adil Shahi Dynasty and are proud of their culture and history.

The younger generation is less interested in using the village sign language. Mobility and technology give them access to the Internet and they travel to Bengaluru where they learn Indian Sign Language and American Sign Language. The lack of formal education is nevertheless a barrier for them to be able to use script-based applications (like text messaging) and there are not many employment opportunities.

A better understanding of the situation of the language could be beneficial for the population. Nobel School (A Private School in a Village) has recently started classes for the deaf children. However, there is a hope to re-open the government school for special children.
