= Nanabin Sign Language =

Deaf sign language of Ghana

- Native to: Ghana
- Region: coast, Central Region
- Native speakers: 25–30 (2010)
- Language family: village sign language, West African gestural area

Language codes
- ISO 639-3: None (mis)
- Glottolog: nana1261

Nanabin Sign Language is a family sign language of the coastal Fante village of Ekumfi Nanabin in the Central Region of Ghana, ca. 8 km east of Mankessim. It is used by three generations of a single family which is mostly deaf. The second generation are bilingual in Ghanaian Sign Language.

Nanabin SL is similar to Adamorobe Sign Language in certain conventionalized signs deriving from Akan hearing culture. Both use lax handshapes and portray events from the perspective of the character rather than of the observer.
