= Algerian Jewish Sign Language =

Sign language from Ghardaïa, Algeria

- Ghardaia Sign Language שפת הסימנים של יהודי אלג'יריה sfat ha-simanim shel yehudi aljiriah
- שפת הסימנים הע׳רדאית sfat ha-simanim ha-ghardait שס"ע׳ shassagh [abbr.]
- Native to: Israel, possibly France
- Users: Moribund (2012)
- Language family: village sign language

Language codes
- ISO 639-3: ajs
- Glottolog: ghar1240

Algerian Jewish Sign Language (AJSL), also known as Ghardaia Sign Language, is a moribund village sign language originally of Ghardaïa, Algeria that is now used in Israel and possibly also in France.

The Jewish community of Ghardaïa immigrated to France and Israel during the years 1943 to 1962. However, because deaf Algerian Jews tended to marry deaf Israelis from other backgrounds, they adopted Israeli Sign Language (ISL) as their primary language and AJSL is now used only by older generations.

Little is known about its use in France.
