= Mardin Sign Language =

Deaf sign language of Turkey

Mardin Sign
- Native to: Turkey
- Region: Mardin
- Native speakers: 40 (2012)
- Language family: family sign language isolate

Language codes
- ISO 639-3: dsz
- Glottolog: mard1245
- ELP: Mardin Sign Language

Mardin Sign Language (MarSL; Turkish: Mardin İşaret Dili) is a family sign language of Turkey. It was originally spoken in the town of Mardin, dating back at least five generations in a single extended family. All speakers now live in İzmir or Istanbul, and the younger generation has shifted to Turkish Sign Language.

Signers refer to their language as "dilsizce" (Turkish for "deaf language") or "eski işaretler" (Turkish for "old signs").

== Documentation ==
MarSL is severely endangered. Most young signers use Turkish Sign Language, and the only fluent users of MarSL are over 50. Recent efforts have been made to create corpora for MarSL, as well as document the language.

== See also ==
- Deafness in Türkiye
