= Hausa Sign Language =

Deaf sign language of Nigeria

- Maganar hannu
- Native to: Nigeria
- Region: Northern Nigeria
- Ethnicity: Hausa people
- Native speakers: 20,000 (2021)
- Language family: Deaf-community sign language

Language codes
- ISO 639-3: hsl
- Glottolog: haus1246
- ELP: Hausa Sign Language

Hausa Sign Language (HSL; Hausa: Maganar hannu or Harshen bebaye na ƙasar Hausa) is the indigenous sign language of the Deaf community in northern Nigeria.

== Overview ==
There are no statistics on the number of deaf people in northern Nigeria or in Nigeria in general or on the number of people who use Hausa Sign Language. Estimates as to the number of signers using this language "vary greatly, from 70,000 to five million".

There is no information on the origin of Hausa Sign Language, but it is believed that deaf people have always used HSL for communication. Hausa Sign Language is not taught formally in schools but is handed down from one generation to the next. Deaf children learn it from their parents, from their peers or other members of the deaf community. HSL is constantly enriched whenever deaf people meet, whether informally or in schools, associations or other groups.

== Linguistic structure ==
Hausa Sign Language is a language in its own right with its own lexicon and grammar. It can be analysed linguistically like other spoken and sign languages. The HSL lexicon does, however, include loanwords from spoken Hausa, the surrounding major spoken language. Even though HSL grammar differs from spoken Hausa language grammar, there are influences from the spoken language in some users.

HSL signs are articulated by the hands. Each sign is composed of a number of components that are called the manual parameters, i.e. handshape, orientation, movement, and location. A sign may be articulated by one hand or both. Body posture and movement as well as facial expressions and other non-manual parameters play a role as well. They may be inherent parts of signs but may also be used to express grammatical features, e.g. question markers and emphasis.
