= Kafr Qasem Sign Language =

Village sign language of Israel

Kafr Qasem Sign
- KQSL
- لغة الإشارة القاسم (Arabic); Lughat il-Ishārah il-Qasim
- Native to: Israel
- Region: Kafr Qasem
- Native speakers: 50 (2020)
- Language family: village sign

Language codes
- ISO 639-3: sqx
- Glottolog: kafr1234

Kafr Qasem Sign Language (لغة الإشارة الكفر قاسم (Arabic) Lughat il-Ishārah il-Kafr Qasim) is a village sign language in Israel.

The language is in the process of being documented, mainly at the University of Haifa. Kafr Qasem is characterized by a relatively high percentage of people with a hearing impairment, and apparently, their sign language developed spontaneously over the years, even if it was influenced by Israeli Sign Language and local sign languages from the region.

The beginning of the deaf community in Kafr Qasem began at the beginning of the 20th century, when a villager married a deaf woman from Mazraa. The couple had deaf children, who in turn married and had more deaf children. In 1951, there were 1800 residents in Kafr Qasem, 12 of whom were deaf. The need to communicate with them led to the development of a sign language shared by the locals – deaf and hearing.
