= Adamorobe Sign Language =

Village sign language of Ghana

- Mumu kasa
- Native to: Ghana
- Region: eastern Ghana, Adamorobe village
- Native speakers: 40 deaf (2012); Many of the 3,500 hearing villagers (2012) sign to varying degrees
- Language family: Village sign language, West African gestural area

Language codes
- ISO 639-3: ads
- Glottolog: adam1238
- ELP: Adamorobe Sign Language

Adamorobe Sign Language or AdaSL is a village sign language used in Adamorobe, an Akan village in eastern Ghana. It is used by about 30 deaf and 1370 hearing people (2003).

The Adamorobe community is notable for its unusually high incidence of hereditary deafness (genetic recessive autosome). As of 2012, about 1.1% of the total population is deaf, but the percentage was as high as 11% in 1961 before the local chief instituted a policy prohibiting deaf people to marry other deaf. Deaf people are fully incorporated into the community.

Under these circumstances, AdaSL has developed as an indigenous sign language, fully independent from the country's standard Ghanaian Sign Language (which is related to American Sign Language). AdaSL is a shared sign language which differs from urban sign languages such as Ghanaian Sign Language because the majority of speakers of a shared sign language aren't actually deaf. National sign languages usually emerge for the purpose of use by deaf individuals such as those attending schools specifically for the deaf. This important feature of shared sign languages alters the way it is maintained, developed, and shared. A historical example of a shared signing community is the island Martha's Vineyard (Martha's Vineyard Sign Language).

AdaSL shares signs and prosodic features with some other sign languages in the region, such as Bura Sign Language, but it has been suggested these similarities are due to culturally shared gestures rather than a genetic relationship. AdaSL has features that set it apart from the sign languages of large deaf communities studied so far, including the absence of the type of classifier construction that expresses motion or location (sometimes called "entity classifiers"). Instead, AdaSL uses several types of serial verb constructions also found in the surrounding spoken language, Akan. Frishberg suggests that AdaSL may be related to the "gestural trade jargon used in the markets throughout West Africa". Thus AdaSL provides an interesting domain for research on cross-linguistic sign languages.

For over a decade, the deaf children of the village have attended a boarding school in Mampong-Akuapem, where the ASL based Ghanaian Sign Language is used. As a consequence, this language has become the first language of these children and their command of AdaSL is decreasing. This is likely to lead to a complete shift of the deaf community in Adamorobe to Ghanaian Sign Language. As such, AdaSL is an endangered sign language.
