= Village sign language =

Local indigenous sign language

A village sign language, or village sign, also known as a shared sign language, is a local indigenous sign language used by both deaf and hearing in an area with a high incidence of congenital deafness. Meir et al. define a village sign language as one which "arise[s] in an existing, relatively insular community into which a number of deaf children are born." The term "rural sign language" refers to almost the same concept. In many cases, the sign language is known throughout the community by a large portion of the hearing population. These languages generally include signs derived from gestures used by the hearing population, so that neighboring village sign languages may be lexically similar without being actually related, due to local similarities in cultural gestures which preceded the sign languages. Most village sign languages are endangered due to the spread of formal education for the deaf, which use or generate deaf-community sign languages, such as a national or foreign sign language.

When a language is not shared with the village or hearing community as a whole, but is only used within a few families and their friends, it may be distinguished as a family sign language. In such cases, most of the hearing signers may be native speakers of the language, if they are members of one of these families, or acquired it at a young age.

== Characteristics ==
The nature of the village sign language depends on the nature of deafness in the community. Where deafness is genetically recessive, deaf children may not have immediate family who are deaf, but instead have more distant deaf relatives. Many largely hearing families have deaf members, so large numbers of hearing people sign (though not always well). In Desa Kolok on Bali, for example, two thirds of villagers sign even though only 2% are deaf; in Adamorobe, Ghana, the number of hearing signers is ten times the number of deaf people, and the community has developed its own indigenous sign language used by both deaf and hearing villagers. This means there is generally good communication between the deaf and hearing people outside of their families, and thus a high degree of intermarriage between the deaf and hearing. In extreme cases, such as on Providencia Island, Colombia, nearly all conversations deaf people have are with the hearing, and there is little direct communication between deaf people themselves, and so little opportunity for the language to develop. Perhaps as a result, Providencia Sign is rather simplistic, the hearing speak to the deaf as if they were stupid, and the deaf are not well integrated into the community. In most recorded cases of village sign, it appears that recessive deafness is at work.

=== Family sign languages ===
Where the deafness is genetically dominant, on the other hand, deafness is largely restricted to particular families, such as the Mardin family of Turkey and the family in which the Central Taurus Sign Language of Turkey emerged. Deaf people tend to have deaf children, and so pass the language on directly. With plenty of direct contact between deaf signers, the languages tend to be well developed. With fewer hearing people with deaf relatives, there are also generally fewer hearing people who sign, and less intermarriage; families tend to have their own vocabulary (and perhaps language), as on Amami Oshima in Japan. There are exceptions, however: In Ban Khor in Thailand the deafness is dominant, and restricted to one extended family, but the houses of different families are intermixed within the village, so nearly all hearing people have deaf neighbors, and signing is widespread among all-hearing families.

Village sign contrasts with deaf-community sign languages, which arise where deaf people come together to form their own communities. These include school sign, such as Nicaraguan Sign Language, Penang Sign Language, and the various Tanzanian and Sri Lankan sign languages, which develop in the student bodies of deaf schools which do not use sign as a language of instruction, as well as community languages such as Bamako Sign Language (Mali), Hausa Sign Language (Nigeria), Saigon, Haiphong, and Hanoi Sign Language (Vietnam), Bangkok and Chiangmai Sign Language (Thailand), which arise where generally uneducated deaf people congregate in urban centers for employment. Deaf-community sign languages are not generally known by the hearing population.

There appear to be grammatical differences between village and deaf-community languages, which may parallel the emergence and development of grammar during creolization. Sign space tends to be large. Few village sign languages use sign space for abstract metaphorical or grammatical functions, for example, restricting it to concrete reference, such as pointing to places or where the sun is in the sky at a particular time. It is thought that such differences may be at least partially due to the sociolinguistic setting of the languages. In the case of village sign, speakers are culturally homogenous. They share a common social context, history, and experiences, and know each other personally. This may allow them to communicate without being as explicit as required for a larger, less intimate society. As a consequence, grammatical and other linguistic structures may develop relatively slowly. There are exceptions, however. Kailge Sign Language is reported to use both concrete and metaphorical pointing, and to use sign space grammatically for verbal agreement.

Because, at least in cases of genetically recessive deafness, village sign languages are used by large numbers of hearing people who also use spoken languages, the structures of village sign may be strongly influenced by the structure of the spoken languages. For example, Adamorobe Sign Language of Ghana has serial verbs, a linguistic construction that is also found in the language spoken by the hearing people of the community, the Twi language.

Deaf sign languages contrast with speech-taboo languages such as the various Aboriginal Australian sign languages, which are developed as auxiliary languages by the hearing community and only used secondarily by the deaf, if they (rather than home sign) are used by the deaf at all, and (at least originally) are not independent languages.

== Languages ==
Village sign languages have historically appeared and disappeared as communities have shifted, and many are unknown or undescribed. Attested examples include:

- Adamorobe Sign Language, Nanabin Sign Language (Ghana)
- Alipur Sign Language, Naga Sign Language (India)
- Al-Sayyid Bedouin Sign Language (Israel)
- Amami Island Sign Language (Japan; perhaps several languages)
- Ban Khor Sign Language, Huay Hai Sign Language, Na Sai Sign Language (Thailand, perhaps a single language)
- Bay Islands Sign Language
- Bouakako Sign Language (LaSiBo, Ivory Coast)
- possibly Bribri Sign Language, Brunca Sign Language (Costa Rica)
- Bura Sign Language (Nigeria)
- Central Taurus Sign Language (Turkey)
- Chatino Sign Language (Mexico)
- Ghardaia Sign Language (Algeria → Israel)
- Henniker Sign Language, Sandy River Valley Sign Language (US)
- Inuit Sign Language (Canada)
- Jumla Sign Language, Jhankot Sign Language, Ghandruk Sign Language (Nepal)
- Ka'apor Sign Language (Brazil)
- Kafr Qasem Sign Language (Israel)
- Kailge Sign Language (Papua New Guinea, perhaps related to SSSL)
- Kata Kolok (Bali, Indonesia)
- Keresan Sign Language (US)
- Leading Tickles Sign Language (Canada)
- Mardin Sign Language (Turkey)
- Maritime Sign Language (Canada, part of the BANZSL family)
- Martha's Vineyard Sign Language (US)
- Maunabudhuk–Bodhe Sign Language (Nepal)
- Mayan Sign Language (Mexico, Guatemala)
- Old Kent Sign Language (England)
- Providence Island Sign Language (Colombia)
- Sinasina Sign Language (Papua New Guinea)
- Tebul Sign Language (Mali)
- Terena Sign Language (Brazil)

The alleged Rennellese Sign Language of the Solomon Islands was home sign. It is not clear if the reported Marajo Sign Language in Brazil is a coherent language or home sign in various families; similarly with Maxakali Sign Language, also in Brazil, which is at least very young. With Mehek Sign Language (Papua New Guinea), signs are quite variable, suggesting at most only an incipient coherent village language along with much home sign.

== See also ==
- Home sign
- List of sign languages
- Deaf-community sign language
