= Languages of Nepal =

- Most-spoken languages of Nepal
- Official: Nepali
- Semi-official: Nepalbhasa, Maithili, Limbu, Bhojpuri, Bajjika, Tamang, Magar, Gurung, Tharu, Awadhi, Doteli
- Indigenous: Many Indo-Aryan languages and Sino-Tibetan languages; Kurukh, Santali
- Vernacular: Nepalese English
- Foreign: English
- Signed: Nepali Sign Language • Jhankot Sign Language • Jumla Sign Language • Ghandruk Sign Language
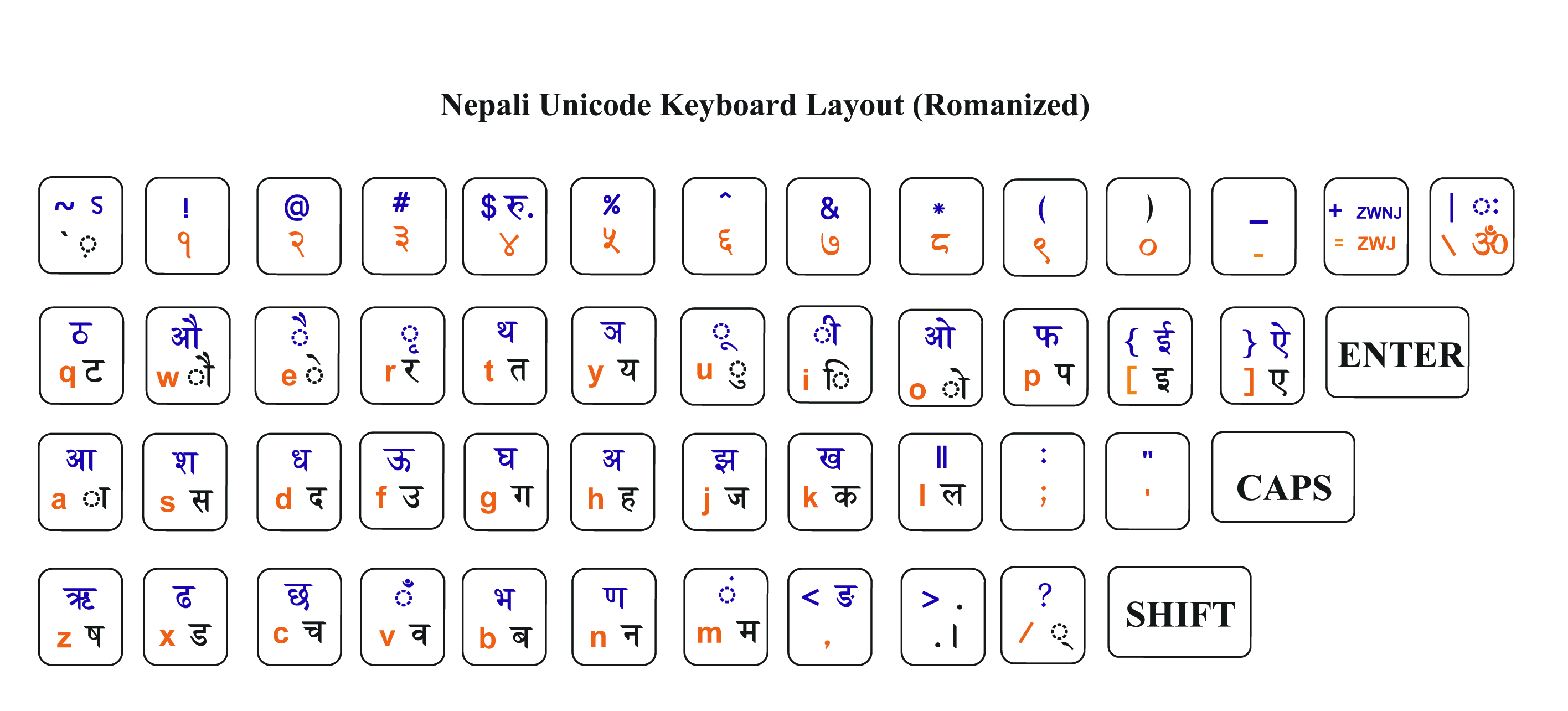
- Keyboard layout: QWERTY/Nepali keyboard

Languages of Nepal, referred to as Nepalese languages in the country's constitution, are the languages having at least an ancient history or origin inside the sovereign territory of Nepal, spoken by Nepalis.

There were 124 mother tongues according to the "National Report on caste/ethnicity, language & religion", National Population and Housing Census 2021 in Nepal.

Nepali accounted as a mother tongue for 44.86% while also being a second additional language for 46.2% of the total population. Most belong to the Indo-Aryan and Sino-Tibetan language families.

The official working language at federal level is Nepali, but the constitution provisions each province to choose one or more additional official working languages. The Language Commission of Nepal in 2021 recommended 14 official languages for different provinces of Nepal.

The mother languages of Nepal, or languages of Nepali origin are sometimes referred to as Nepali languages.

== National languages ==
According to the constitution of Nepal: "All languages spoken as the mother tongue in Nepal are the languages of the nation". Many of the languages also have various dialects. For example, the Rai people have about 30 languages. Some of the languages are similar and may be considered dialects. The distinction between dialects and languages is sometimes unclear.

== Official languages ==
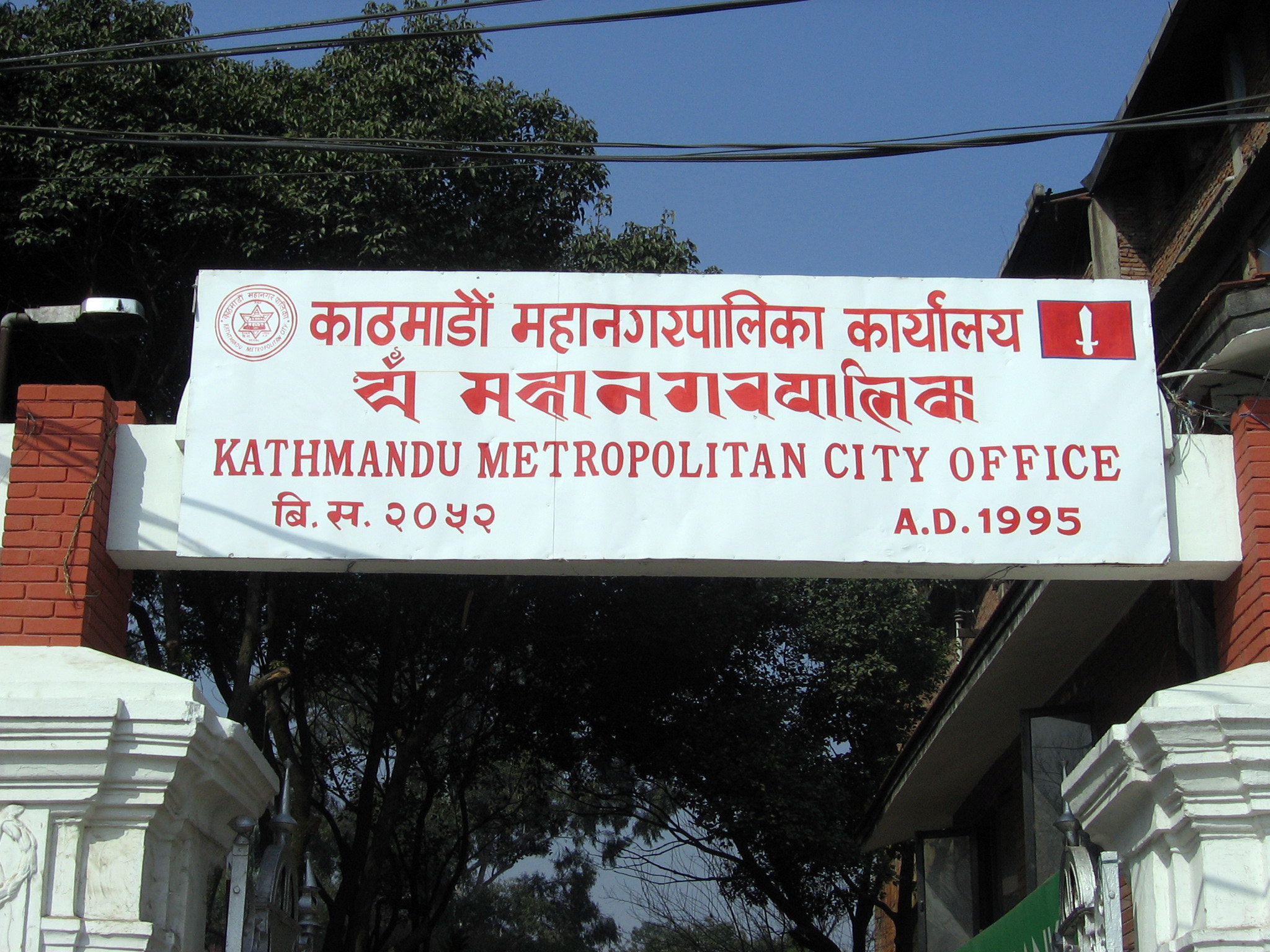
Government office with signage in Ranjana script, Devanagari and English

Nepali in Devanagari script is the official working language in federal level. The constitution has provisioned provinces to choose one or more than one official language(s) besides Nepali. According to the Language Commission of Nepal Maithili and Limbu are recommended to have official status in Koshi Province; Maithili, Bhojpuri and Bajjika in Madhesh Province; Tamang and Nepal Bhasa (Newar) in Bagmati Province; Magar and Gurung in Gandaki Province; Tharu and Awadhi in Lumbini Province; Nepali (Khas Bhasa)'s Karnali dialect and Magar in Karnali Province; Dotyali and Tharu in Sudurpashchim Province.

== Constitutional status ==
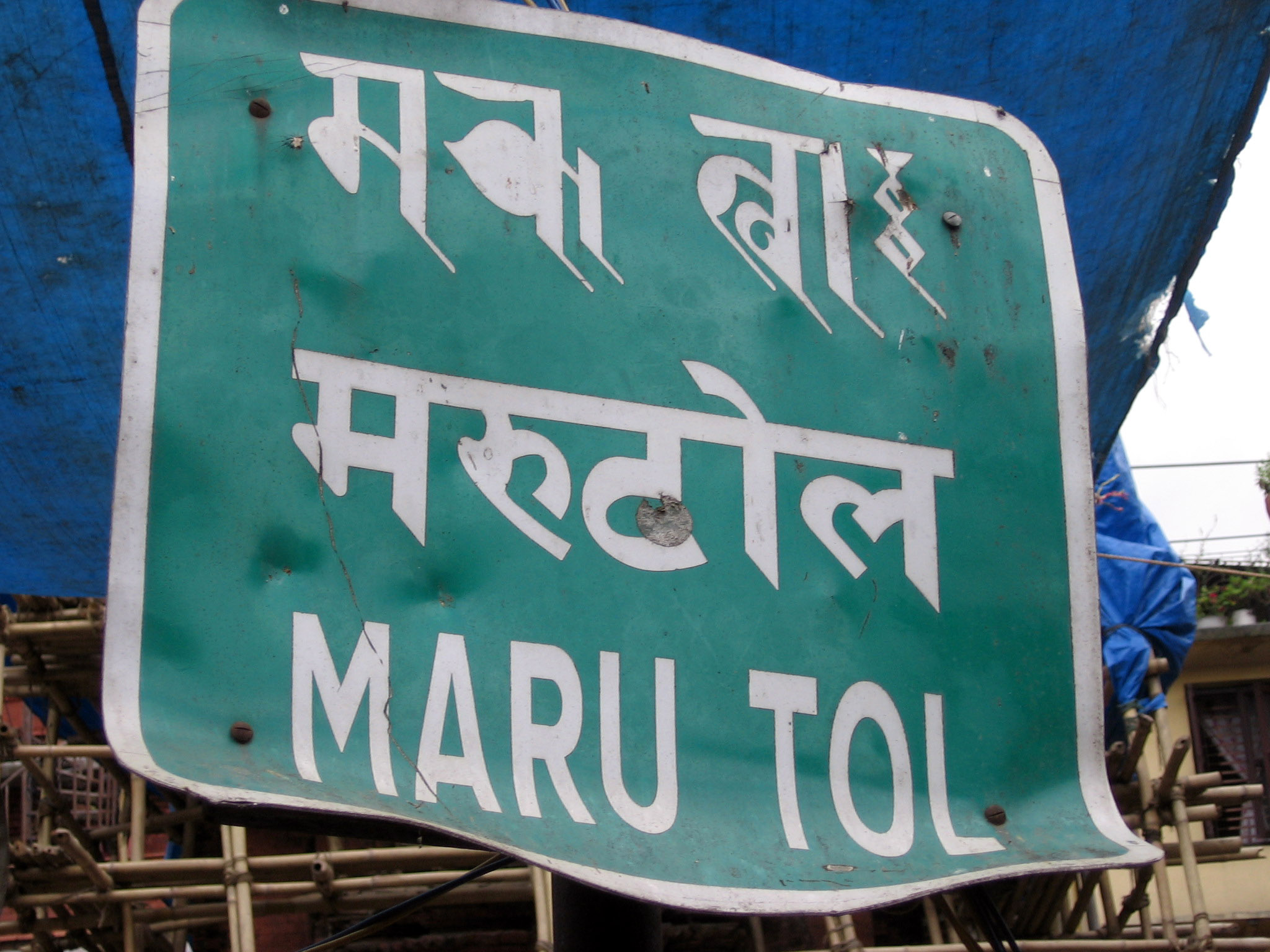
Street sign in Ranjana script, Devanagari script and English in Kathmandu

Part 1 of the Constitution of Nepal 2015 (2072 B.S.) contains these provisions about the languages of Nepal:

- Article 6: All languages spoken as the mother tongue in Nepal are the languages of the nation.
- Article 7(1): The Nepali language in the Devanagari script shall be the official language of Nepal.
- Article 7(2): A Province may, by a provincial law, determine one or more than one languages of the nation spoken by a majority of people within the Province as its official language or languages, in addition to the Nepali language.

== Classification ==
Nepal's languages are mostly either Indo-European or Sino-Tibetan, while only a very few of them are Austro-Asiatic and Dravidian.

Out of 124 languages reported in 2021 census, the 45 Indo-European languages, which are of the Indo-Aryan (Indic) sub-family (excluding English), constitute the largest group in terms of the numeric strength of their speakers, nearly 83.1% of the population. Nepali, Bhojpuri, Maithili, Awadhi, the Tharu languages and Hindustani (Hindi-Urdu) fall in this group.

The Sino-Tibetan family of Nepal's languages forms a part of its Tibeto-Burman group. Though spoken by relatively fewer people than the Indo-European family (16.6% of population), it includes a greater number of languages, about 73 languages. Languages belonging to this group include Tamang, Nepal Bhasa (Newar), Magar and Limbu.

The small declining number of Dravidian languages are represented by Kurux, and the Munda languages of the Austroasiatic family by Santali and Mundari.

The indigenous languages of Nepal that predated the influx of Indic, Tibeto-Burman, and other families barely survive in the Kusunda language, which is nearly extinct today.

Nepal also has several indigenous village sign languages: Jhankot Sign Language, Jumla Sign Language, Ghandruk Sign Language and Maunabudhuk-Bodhe Sign Language, in addition to the Nepali Sign Language designed for national use.

Number of speakers by language family (2021 census)
Language family	Number of speakers	Percentage (%)
Indo-European	24,227,411	83.07%
Sino-Tibetan	4,837,808	16.59%
Austro-Asiatic	55,916	0.19%
Dravidian	38,873	0.13%
Others	3,799	0.01%
Not reported	346	0.00%
Total	29,164,578	100

== Languages in Nepal as of 2021 ==
There were 124 mother tongues according to the "National Report on caste/ethnicity, language & religion", National Population and Housing Census 2021 in Nepal.

Nepali accounted as a mother tongue for 44.86% while also being a second additional language for 46.2% of the total population.

=== Mother tongues ===
There were 124 mother tongues according to the "National Report on caste/ethnicity, language & religion", National Population and Housing Census 2021 in Nepal.111 were previously reported in the earlier census 2011 and 13 were newly found in the census 2021. Some of the foreign languages reported in 2011 census have been included in "Other Language" category due very few number of speakers.

The newly added mother tongues were Bhote, Lowa, Chum/Nubri, Baragunwa, Nar-Phu, Ranatharu, Karmarong, Mugali, Tichhurong Poike, Sadri, Done, Munda/Mudiyari and Kewarat.

Population by mother tongue and sex, NPHC 2021

Number of native speakers (2021 census)
Rank	Language	Language family	Total	Percentage (%)
1	Nepali	Indo-European	13,084,457	44.86
2	Maithili	Indo-European	3,222,389	11.05
3	Bhojpuri	Indo-European	1,820,795	6.24
4	Tharu	Indo-European	1,714,091	5.88
5	Tamang	Sino-Tibetan	1,423,075	4.88
6	Bajjika	Indo-European	1,133,764	3.89
7	Avadhi	Indo-European	864,276	2.96
8	Nepal Bhasha (Newar)	Sino-Tibetan	863,380	2.96
9	Magar Dhut	Sino-Tibetan	810,315	2.78
10	Doteli	Indo-European	494,864	1.7
11	Urdu	Indo-European	413,785	1.42
12	Yakthung/Limbu	Sino-Tibetan	350,436	1.2
13	Gurung	Sino-Tibetan	328,074	1.12
14	Magahi	Indo-European	230,117	0.79
15	Baitadeli	Indo-European	152,666	0.52
16	Rai	Sino-Tibetan	144,512	0.5
17	Achhami	Indo-European	141,444	0.48
18	Bantawa	Sino-Tibetan	138,003	0.47
19	Rajbanshi	Indo-European	130,163	0.45
20	Sherpa	Sino-Tibetan	117,896	0.4
21	Khash	Indo-European	117,511	0.4
22	Bajhangi	Indo-European	99,631	0.34
23	Hindi	Indo-European	98,399	0.34
24	Magar Kham	Sino-Tibetan	91,753	0.31
25	Chamling	Sino-Tibetan	89,037	0.31
26	Ranatharu	Indo-European	77,766	0.27
27	Chepang	Sino-Tibetan	58,392	0.2
28	Bajureli	Indo-European	56,486	0.19
29	Santali	Austro-Asiatic	53,677	0.18
30	Danuwar	Indo-European	49,992	0.17
31	Darchuleli	Indo-European	45,649	0.16
32	Uranw/Urau	Dravidian	38,873	0.13
33	Kulung	Sino-Tibetan	37,912	0.13
34	Angika	Indo-European	35,952	0.12
35	Majhi	Indo-European	32,917	0.11
36	Sunuwar	Sino-Tibetan	32,708	0.11
37	Thami	Sino-Tibetan	26,805	0.09
38	Ganagai	Indo-European	26,281	0.09
39	Thulung	Sino-Tibetan	24,405	0.08
40	Bangla	Indo-European	23,774	0.08
41	Ghale	Sino-Tibetan	23,049	0.08
42	Sampang	Sino-Tibetan	21,597	0.07
43	Marwadi	Indo-European	21,333	0.07
44	Dadeldhuri	Indo-European	21,300	0.07
45	Dhimal	Sino-Tibetan	20,583	0.07
46	Tajpuriya	Indo-European	20,349	0.07
47	Kumal	Indo-European	18,435	0.06
48	Khaling	Sino-Tibetan	16,514	0.06
49	Musalman	Indo-European	16,252	0.06
50	Wambule	Sino-Tibetan	15,285	0.05
51	Bahing/Bayung	Sino-Tibetan	14,449	0.05
52	Yakkha	Sino-Tibetan	14,241	0.05
53	Sanskrit	Indo-European	13,906	0.05
54	Bhujel	Sino-Tibetan	13,086	0.04
55	Bhote	Sino-Tibetan	12,895	0.04
56	Darai	Indo-European	12,156	0.04
57	Yamphu/Yamphe	Sino-Tibetan	10,744	0.04
58	Nachhiring	Sino-Tibetan	9,906	0.03
59	Hyolmo/Yholmo	Sino-Tibetan	9,658	0.03
60	Dumi	Sino-Tibetan	8,638	0.03
61	Jumli	Indo-European	8,338	0.03
62	Bote	Indo-European	7,687	0.03
63	Mewahang	Sino-Tibetan	7,428	0.03
64	Puma	Sino-Tibetan	6,763	0.02
65	Pahari	Sino-Tibetan	5,946	0.02
66	Athpahariya	Sino-Tibetan	5,580	0.02
67	Dungmali	Sino-Tibetan	5,403	0.02
68	Jirel	Sino-Tibetan	5,167	0.02
69	Tibetan	Sino-Tibetan	5,053	0.02
70	Dailekhi	Indo-European	4,989	0.02
71	Chum/Nubri	Sino-Tibetan	4,284	0.01
72	Chhantyal	Sino-Tibetan	4,282	0.01
73	Raji	Sino-Tibetan	4,247	0.01
74	Thakali	Sino-Tibetan	4,220	0.01
75	Meche	Sino-Tibetan	4,203	0.01
76	Koyee	Sino-Tibetan	4,152	0.01
77	Lohorung	Sino-Tibetan	3,884	0.01
78	Kewarat	Indo-European	3,469	0.01
79	Dolpali	Indo-European	3,244	0.01
80	Done	Indo-European	3,100	0.01
81	Mugali	Sino-Tibetan	2,834	0.01
82	Jero/Jerung	Sino-Tibetan	2,817	0.01
83	Karmarong	Sino-Tibetan	2,619	0.01
84	Chhintang	Sino-Tibetan	2,564	0.01
85	Lhopa	Sino-Tibetan	2,348	0.01
86	Lapcha	Sino-Tibetan	2,240	0.01
87	Munda/Mudiyari	Austro-Asiatic	2,107	0.01
88	Manange	Sino-Tibetan	2,022	0.01
89	Chhiling	Sino-Tibetan	2,011	0.01
90	Dura	Sino-Tibetan	1,991	0.01
91	Tilung	Sino-Tibetan	1,969	0.01
92	Sign Language	-	1,784	0.01
93	Byansi	Sino-Tibetan	1,706	0.01
94	Balkura/Baram	Sino-Tibetan	1,539	0.01
95	Baragunwa	Sino-Tibetan	1,536	0.01
96	Sadri	Indo-European	1,347	0
97	English	Indo-European	1,323	0
98	Magar Kaike	Sino-Tibetan	1,225	0
99	Sonaha	Indo-European	1,182	0
100	Hayu/Vayu	Sino-Tibetan	1,133	0
101	Kisan	Indo-European	1,004	0
102	Punjabi	Indo-European	871	0
103	Dhuleli	Sino-Tibetan	786	0
104	Khamchi(Raute)	Sino-Tibetan	741	0
105	Lungkhim	Sino-Tibetan	702	0
106	Lowa	Sino-Tibetan	624	0
107	Kagate	Sino-Tibetan	611	0
108	Waling/Walung	Sino-Tibetan	545	0
109	Nar-Phu	Sino-Tibetan	428	0
110	Lhomi	Sino-Tibetan	413	0
111	Tichhurong Poike	Sino-Tibetan	410	0
112	Kurmali	Indo-European	397	0
113	Koche	Sino-Tibetan	332	0
114	Sindhi	Indo-European	291	0
115	Phangduwali	Sino-Tibetan	247	0
116	Belhare	Sino-Tibetan	177	0
117	Surel	Sino-Tibetan	174	0
118	Malpande	Indo-European	161	0
119	Khariya	Austro-Asiatic	132	0
120	Sadhani	Indo-European	122	0
121	Hariyanwi	Indo-European	114	0
122	Sam	Sino-Tibetan	106	0
123	Bankariya	Sino-Tibetan	86	0
124	Kusunda	Language Isolate	23	0
Others			4,201	0.01
Not stated			346	0
Total			29,164,578	100

=== Second language ===
There were 25 languages that were being used as second language by more than 10 thousand population on each in the "National Report on caste/ethnicity, language & religion", National Population and Housing Census 2021 in Nepal, whereas there were only 18 such languages reported as second language in the earlier census 2011.

Population by second language, NPHC 2021

Rank	Second language	Total	Percentage
1	No second language	14,023,086	48.08
2	Nepali	13,482,904	46.23
3	Maithili	267,621	0.92
4	Hindi	223,106	0.76
5	Bhojpuri	138,572	0.48
6	English	102,561	0.35
7	Tharu	89,606	0.31
8	Bajjika	86,062	0.3
9	Avadhi	75,651	0.26
10	Urdu	72,128	0.25
11	Tamang	71,569	0.25
12	Magar Dhut	54,143	0.19
13	Bhote	45,292	0.16
14	Bantawa	43,536	0.15
15	Nepal Bhasa (Newar)	32,604	0.11
16	Chamling	29,253	0.1
17	Magahi	29,191	0.1
18	Gurung	23,698	0.08
19	Yakthung/Limbu	19,705	0.07
20	Thulung	17,187	0.06
21	Magar Kham	16,814	0.06
22	Bahing/Bayung	15,104	0.05
23	Rai	14,398	0.05
24	Doteli	14,344	0.05
25	Sampang	14,261	0.05
26	Khaling	10,370	0.04
27	Baitadeli	9,521	0.03
28	Sherpa	9,435	0.03
29	Sanskrit	6,615	0.02
30	Achhami	6,522	0.02
31	Angika	6,127	0.02
32	Musalman	6,084	0.02
33	Kulung	6,039	0.02
34	Dumi	5,870	0.02
35	Dadeldhuri	5,535	0.02
36	Bangla	5,447	0.02
37	Wambule	5,227	0.02
38	Darchuleli	4,272	0.01
39	Puma	4,271	0.01
40	Rajbanshi	4,103	0.01
41	Bote	3,891	0.01
42	Mewahang	3,669	0.01
43	Marwadi	3,449	0.01
44	Nachhiring	3,176	0.01
45	Tibetan	3,134	0.01
46	Bajhangi	2,641	0.01
47	Khash	2,607	0.01
48	Chhintang	2,135	0.01
49	Tilung	1,762	0.01
50	Sunuwar	1,597	0.01
51	Belhare	1,491	0.01
52	Punjabi	1,274	0
53	Dungmali	1,271	0
54	Jero/Jerung	1,245	0
55	Jumli	1,125	0
56	Bajureli	1,076	0
57	Dhimal	999	0
58	Majhi	971	0
59	Ghale	963	0
60	Koyee	928	0
61	Ranatharu	871	0
62	Thami	859	0
63	Danuwar	845	0
64	Chepang	833	0
65	Sign Language	828	0
66	Bhujel	740	0
67	Thakali	733	0
68	Yakkha	704	0
69	Santali	703	0
70	Chhiling	685	0
71	Ganagai	644	0
72	Lohorung	622	0
73	Kumal	615	0
74	Kagate	615	0
75	Darai	591	0
76	Khamchi(Raute)	526	0
77	Magar Kaike	515	0
78	Hyolmo/Yholmo	508	0
79	Yamphu/Yamphe	494	0
80	Dailekhi	434	0
81	Chhantyal	394	0
82	Hayu/Vayu	349	0
83	Koche	335	0
84	Jirel	332	0
85	Athpahariya	320	0
86	Balkura/Baram	307	0
87	Waling/Walung	304	0
88	Manange	304	0
89	Dura	278	0
90	Uranw/Urau	245	0
91	Lapcha	242	0
92	Sindhi	217	0
93	Tajpuriya	209	0
94	Dhuleli	187	0
95	Pahari	142	0
96	Lhopa	129	0
97	Dolpali	127	0
98	Sadhani	125	0
99	Sadri	106	0
100	Baragunwa	89	0
101	Phangduwali	85	0
102	Hariyanwi	84	0
103	Sam	79	0
104	Malpande	78	0
105	Raji	76	0
106	Meche	75	0
107	Tichhurong Poike	72	0
108	Surel	64	0
109	Kurmali	60	0
110	Bankariya	42	0
111	Kewarat	38	0
112	Sonaha	35	0
113	Karmarong	34	0
114	Kisan	33	0
115	Byansi	32	0
116	Kusunda	32	0
117	Lungkhim	28	0
118	Mugali	23	0
Others		159	0
Not stated		8,105	0.03
Total		29,164,578	100

Number of native speakers (2011 census)
Rank	Language	Language family	Count	Percentage
1	Nepali	Indo-European	11,826,953	44.64%
2	Maithili	Indo-European	3,092,530	11.67%
3	Bhojpuri	Indo-European	1,584,958	5.98%
4	Tharu	Indo-European	1,529,875	5.77%
5	Tamang	Sino-Tibetan	1,353,311	5.11%
6	Nepal Bhasa (Newar)	Sino-Tibetan	846,557	3.20%
7	Bajjika	Indo-European	793,416	2.99%
8	Magar	Sino-Tibetan	788,530	2.98%
9	Dotyali/Doteli	Indo-European	787,827	2.97%
10	Urdu	Indo-European	691,546	2.61%
11	Awadhi	Indo-European	501,752	1.89%
12	Limbu	Sino-Tibetan	343,603	1.30%
13	Gurung	Sino-Tibetan	325,622	1.23%
14	Baitadeli	Indo-European	272,524	1.03%
15	Rai (Kiranti)	Sino-Tibetan	159,114	0.60%
16	Aachami	Indo-European	142,787	0.54%
17	Bantawa (Rai)	Sino-Tibetan	132,583	0.50%
18	Rajbanshi	Indo-European	122,214	0.46%
19	Sherpa	Sino-Tibetan	114,830	0.43%
20	Hindi	Indo-European	77,569	0.29%
21	Chamling (Rai)	Sino-Tibetan	76,800	0.29%
22	Bajhangi	Indo-European	67,581	0.26%
23	Santhali	Austro-Asiatic	49,858	0.19%
24	Chepang	Sino-Tibetan	48,476	0.18%
25	Danuwar	Indo-European	45,821	0.17%
26	Sunuwar	Sino-Tibetan	37,898	0.14%
27	Magahi	Indo-European	35,614	0.13%
28	Uranw/Kurux	Dravidian	33,651	0.13%
29	Kulung (Rai)	Sino-Tibetan	33,170	0.13%
30	Kham (Magar)	Sino-Tibetan	27,113	0.10%
31	Rajasthani	Indo-European	25,394	0.10%
32	Majhi	Indo-European	24,422	0.09%
33	Thami	Sino-Tibetan	23,151	0.09%
34	Bhujel	Sino-Tibetan	21,715	0.08%
35	Bengali	Indo-European	21,061	0.08%
36	Thulung (Rai)	Sino-Tibetan	20,659	0.08%
37	Yakkha	Sino-Tibetan	19,558	0.07%
38	Dhimal	Sino-Tibetan	19,300	0.07%
39	Tajpuriya	Indo-European	18,811	0.07%
40	Angika	Indo-European	18,555	0.07%
41	Sampang (Rai)	Sino-Tibetan	18,270	0.07%
42	Khaling (Rai)	Sino-Tibetan	14,467	0.05%
43	Wambule (Rai)	Sino-Tibetan	13,470	0.05%
44	Kumal	Indo-European	12,222	0.05%
45	Darai	Indo-European	11,677	0.04%
46	Bahing (Rai)	Sino-Tibetan	11,658	0.04%
47	Bajureli	Indo-European	10,704	0.04%
48	Hyolmo	Sino-Tibetan	10,176	0.04%
49	Nachiring (Rai)	Sino-Tibetan	10,041	0.04%
50	Yamphu (Rai)	Sino-Tibetan	9,208	0.03%
51	Bote	Indo-European	8,766	0.03%
52	Ghale	Sino-Tibetan	8,092	0.03%
53	Dumi (Rai)	Sino-Tibetan	7,638	0.03%
54	Lepcha	Sino-Tibetan	7,499	0.03%
55	Puma (Rai)	Sino-Tibetan	6,686	0.03%
56	Dungmali (Rai)	Sino-Tibetan	6,260	0.02%
57	Darchuleli	Indo-European	5,928	0.02%
58	Aathpariya (Rai)	Sino-Tibetan	5,530	0.02%
59	Thakali	Sino-Tibetan	5,242	0.02%
60	Jirel	Sino-Tibetan	4,829	0.02%
61	Mewahang (Rai)	Sino-Tibetan	4,650	0.02%
62	Sign Language	−	4,476	0.02%
63	Tibetan	Sino-Tibetan	4,445	0.02%
64	Meche	Sino-Tibetan	4,375	0.02%
65	Chhantyal	Sino-Tibetan	4,283	0.02%
66	Raji	Sino-Tibetan	3,758	0.01%
67	Lohorung (Rai)	Sino-Tibetan	3,716	0.01%
68	Chhintang (Rai)	Sino-Tibetan	3,712	0.01%
69	Gangai	Indo-European	3,612	0.01%
70	Pahari	Sino-Tibetan	3,458	0.01%
71	Dailekhi	Indo-European	3,102	0.01%
72	Lhopa	Sino-Tibetan	3,029	0.01%
73	Dura	Sino-Tibetan	2,156	0.01%
74	Koch	Sino-Tibetan	2,080	0.01%
75	Chiling (Rai)	Sino-Tibetan	2,046	0.01%
76	English	Indo-European	2,045	0.01%
77	Jerung (Rai)	Sino-Tibetan	1,763	0.01%
78	Khas	Indo-European	1,747	0.01%
79	Sanskrit	Indo-European	1,669	0.01%
80	Dolpali	Indo-European	1,667	0.01%
81	Hayu	Sino-Tibetan	1,520	0.01%
82	Tilung (Rai)	Sino-Tibetan	1,424	0.01%
83	Koi (Rai)	Sino-Tibetan	1,271	0.00%
84	Kisan	Indo-European	1,178	0.00%
85	Waling (Rai)	Sino-Tibetan	1,169	0.00%
86	Musalban	Indo-European	1,075	0.00%
87	Hariyani/Haryanvi	Indo-European	889	0.00%
88	Jumli	Indo-European	851	0.00%
89	Lhomi	Sino-Tibetan	808	0.00%
90	Punjabi	Indo-European	808	0.00%
91	Belhare (Rai)	Sino-Tibetan	599	0.00%
92	Odia	Indo-European	584	0.00%
93	Sonaha	Indo-European	579	0.00%
94	Sindhi	Indo-European	518	0.00%
95	Dadeldhuri	Indo-European	488	0.00%
96	Byangshi	Sino-Tibetan	480	0.00%
97	Assamese	Indo-European	476	0.00%
98	Raute	Sino-Tibetan	461	0.00%
99	Saam (Rai)	Sino-Tibetan	401	0.00%
100	Manange	Sino-Tibetan	392	0.00%
101	Dhuleli	Sino-Tibetan	347	0.00%
102	Phangduali (Rai)	Sino-Tibetan	290	0.00%
103	Surel	Sino-Tibetan	287	0.00%
104	Malpande	Indo-European	247	0.00%
105	Chinese	Sino-Tibetan	242	0.00%
106	Khariya	Austro-Asiatic	238	0.00%
107	Kurmali	Indo-European	227	0.00%
108	Baram	Sino-Tibetan	155	0.00%
109	Lingkhim (Rai)	Sino-Tibetan	129	0.00%
110	Sadhani	Indo-European	122	0.00%
111	Kagate	Sino-Tibetan	99	0.00%
112	Dzongkha	Sino-Tibetan	80	0.00%
113	Bankariya	Sino-Tibetan	69	0.00%
114	Kaike	Sino-Tibetan	50	0.00%
115	Garhwali (Gadhawali)	Indo-European	38	0.00%
116	French	Indo-European	34	0.00%
117	Mizo	Sino-Tibetan	32	0.00%
118	Kuki	Sino-Tibetan	29	0.00%
119	Kusunda	Language Isolate	28	0.00%
120	Russian	Indo-European	17	0.00%
121	Spanish	Indo-European	16	0.00%
122	Nagamese	Sino-Tibetan	10	0.00%
123	Arabic	Afro-Asiatic	8	0.00%
Not reported			47,718	0.18%
Others			21,173	0.08%
Total			26,494,504	100%

Second language speakers (2011 census)
Language	Count	Percentage
Nepali	8,682,499	32.77%
Maithili	1,225,950	4.62%
Hindi	195, 287	0.73%
Bhojpuri	159,518	0.60%
Tharu	84,748	0.32%
English	81,447	0.30%
Bajjika	60,863	0.23%
Urdu	45,766	0.17%
Awadhi	45,428	0.17%
Magar	42,952	0.16%
Tamang	33,450	0.12%
Nepal Bhasa (Newar)	32,594	0.12%
Sanskrit	2,975	0.01%
Others	190,327	0.72%
Total	10,883,804	41.04%

== Writing systems ==
Most of the languages are found exclusively in oral form. According to the Language Commission, only fifteen scripts are currently in use in Nepal.Nepali is written in Devanagari script, Nepalbhasa (Newar) in Newar script, Ranjana script, Bhujimol script, Maithili in Tirhuta script, and Bhojpuri in Kaithi script. Similarly, Limbu is written in Sirijunga script, Tamang in Tamyig script, Sherpa in Tibetan script, Magar in Akkha script, Gurung in Khema script, Dhimal in Dham script, Sunwar in Kõits script, Lepcha in Rong script and Santhali in Ol Chiki script.

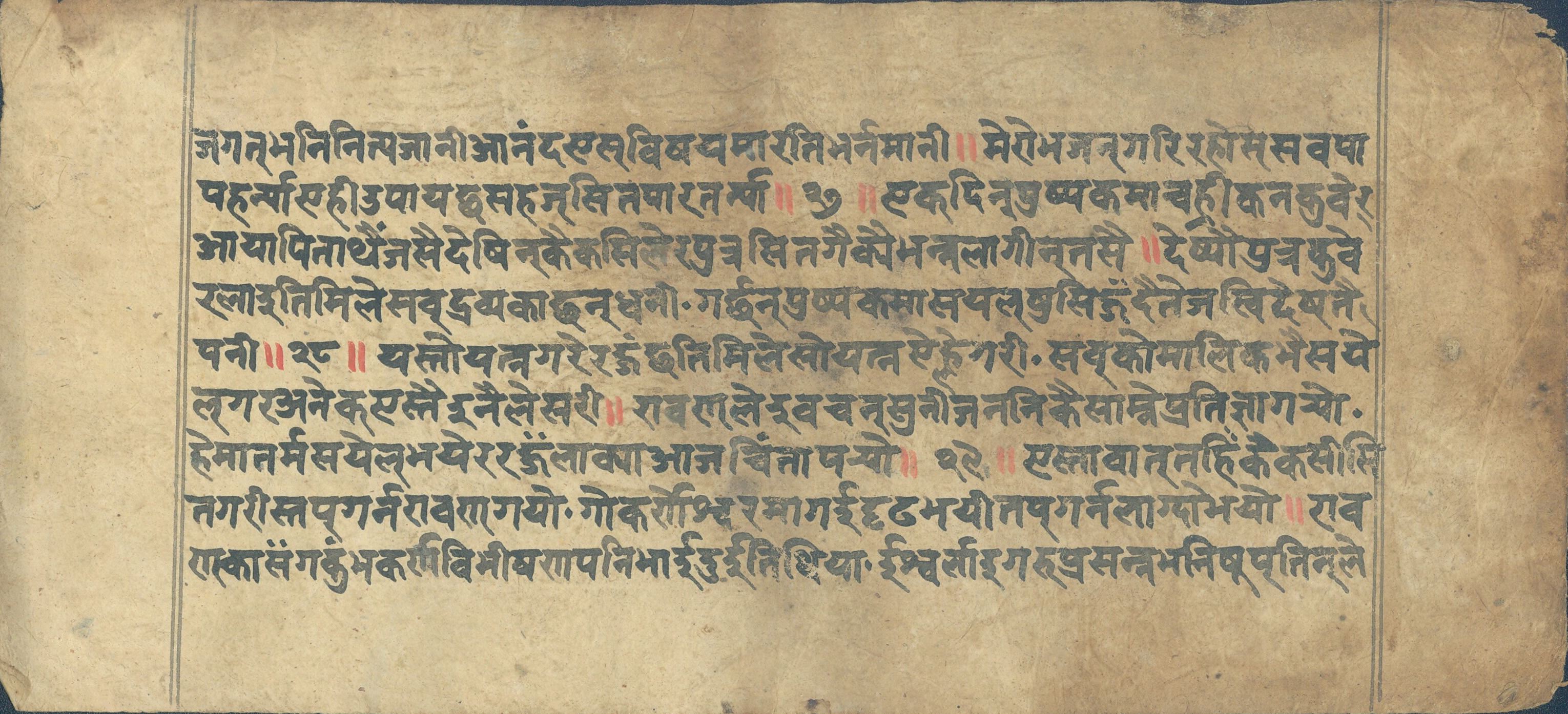
A Nepali language manuscript of Bhanubhakta Ramayana in Devanagari script

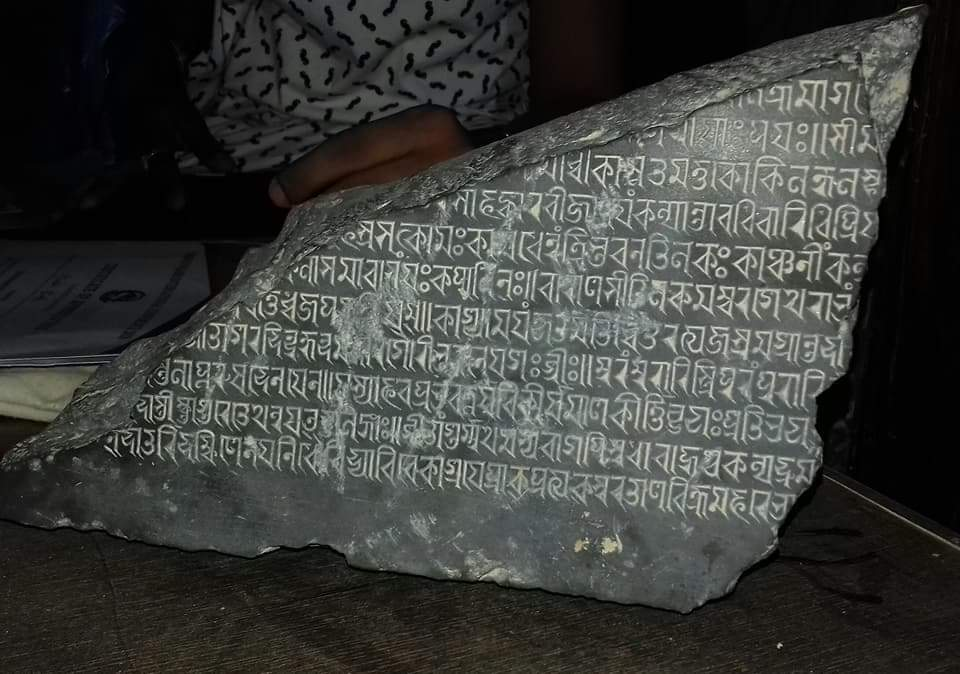
A stone inscription in Tirhuta script from Simraungadh

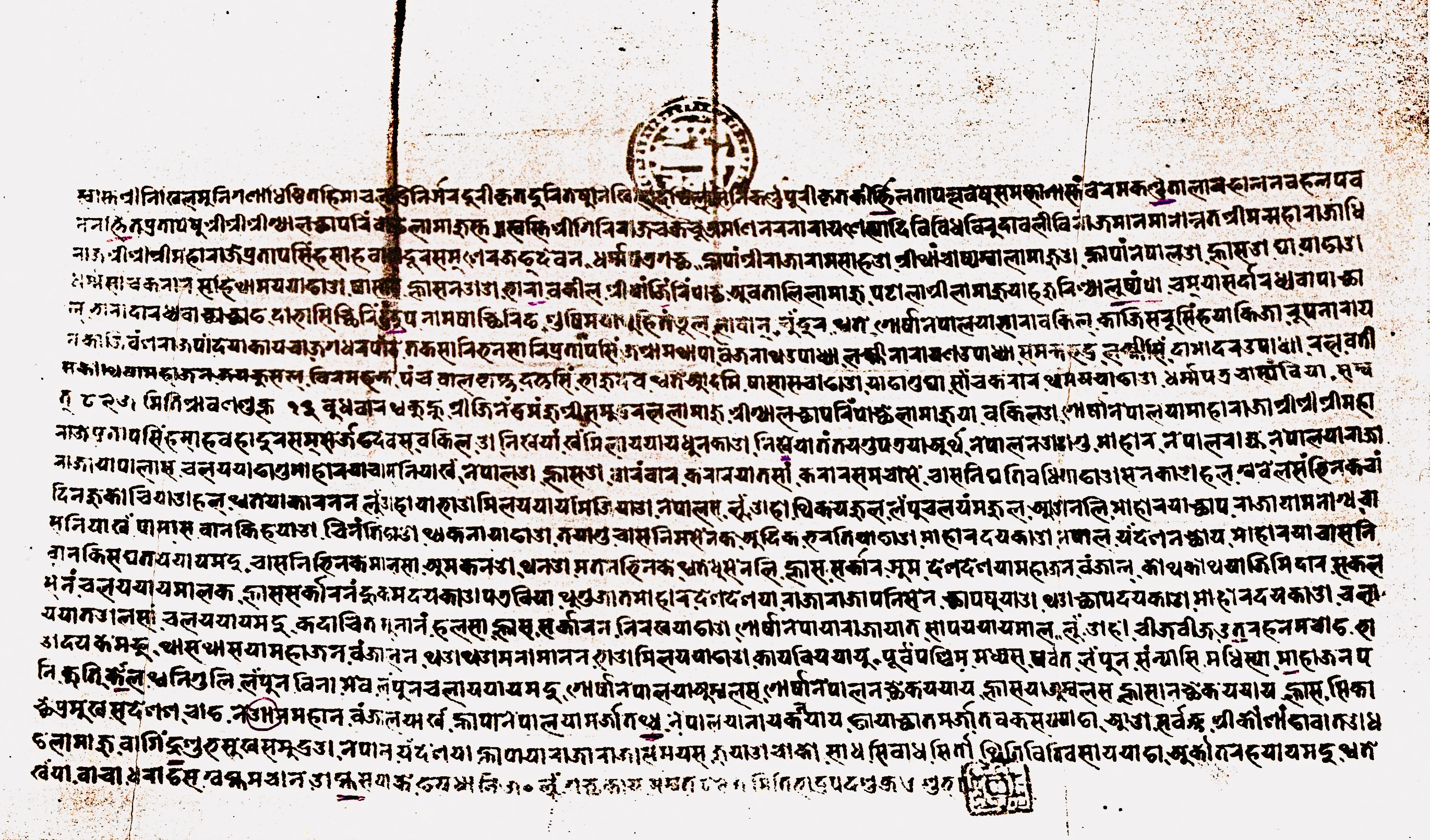
The Nepal-Tibet Treaty of 1775written in Newar language and the Newar script

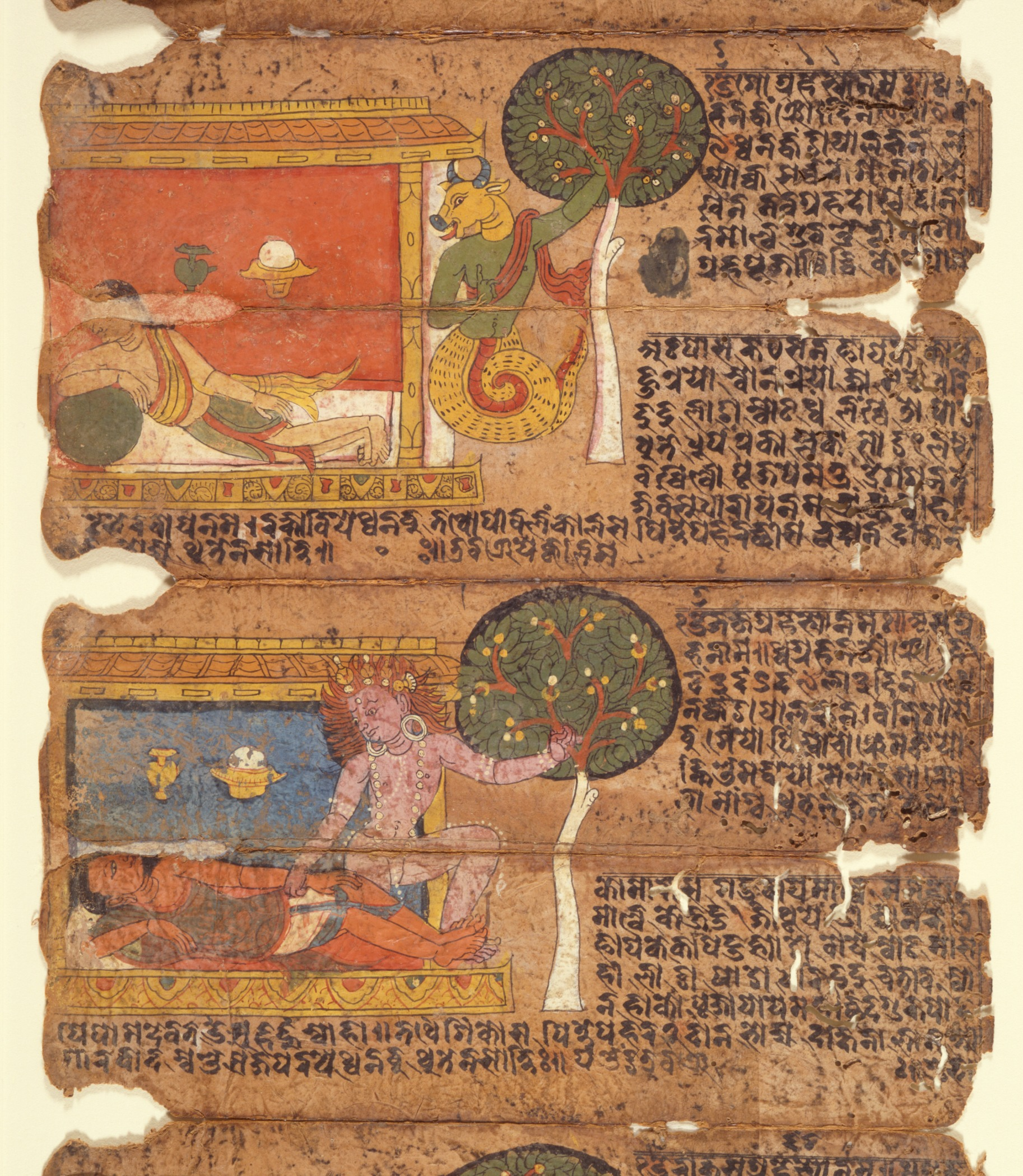
A folio from a Book of Charms written in Newar language and the Bhujimol script

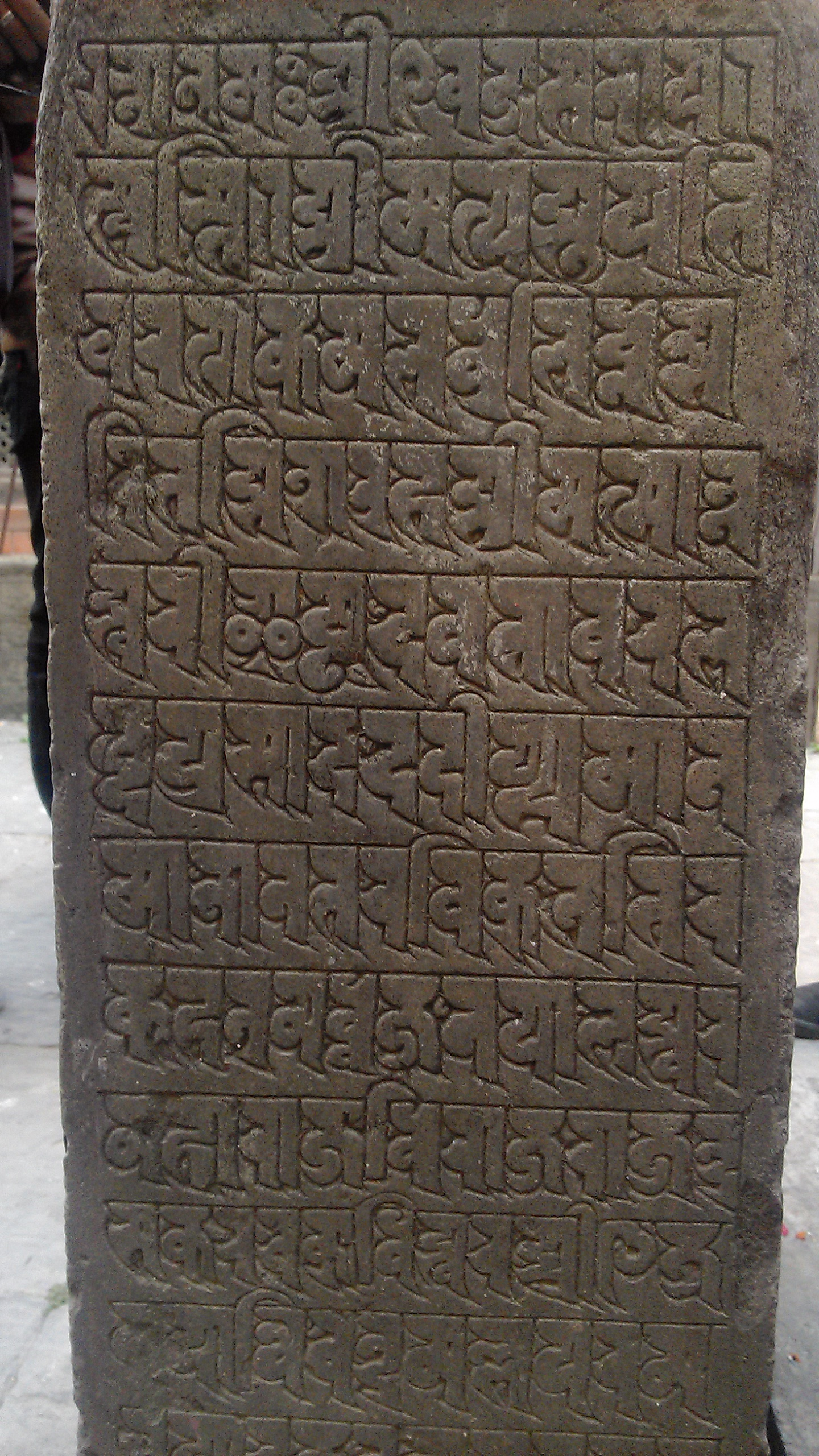
A stone inscription in Ranjana script from Kathmandu

== See also ==
- Ethnic groups in Nepal
