= Indo-Pakistani Sign Language =

Sign language of the Indian subcontinent

- Native to: India, Pakistan, Bangladesh
- Signers: 6,000,000 in India (Indian Sign Language, ins), 1,080,000 in Pakistan (Pakistan Sign Language, pks) (2021)
- Language family: Possibly related to Nepalese Sign
- Dialects: Bangalore-Madras Sign Language; Bombay Sign Language; Calcutta Sign Language; Delhi Sign Language; North West Frontier Province Sign Language; Punjab-Sindh Sign Language

Language codes
- ISO 639-3: Variously: ins – Indian Sign Language pks – Pakistani Sign Language wbs – West Bengal Sign Language
- Glottolog: indo1332 Indo-Pakistani Sign

Indo-Pakistani Sign Language (IPSL; Hindi: भारतीय पाकिस्तानी सांकेतिक भाषा, Urdu: پاک و ہند اشاری زبان) is the predominant sign language in the Indian subcontinent of South Asia, used by at least 15 million deaf signers. As with many sign languages, it is difficult to estimate numbers with any certainty, as the Census of India does not list sign languages and most studies have focused on the north and urban areas. As of 2024, it is the most used sign language in the world, and Ethnologue ranks it as the 156th most spoken language in the world.

Some scholars regard varieties in India, Pakistan, Bangladesh and possibly Nepal as variants of Indo-Pakistani Sign Language. Others recognize some varieties as separate languages. The ISO standard currently distinguishes:

- Indian Sign Language (ins)
- Pakistan Sign Language (pks)
- West Bengal Sign Language (Kolkata Sign Language) (wbs)
- Nepalese Sign Language (nsp)

== Status of sign language ==
Deaf schools in South Asia are overwhelmingly oralist in their approach. Unlike American Sign Language (ASL) and sign languages of European countries, IPSL does not have much official government support. The deaf communities of the Indian subcontinent are still struggling for IPSL to gain the status of sign language as a minority language. Though sign language is used by many deaf people in the subcontinent, it is not used officially in schools for teaching purposes.

=== India ===
In 2005, the National Curricular Framework (NCF) gave some degree of legitimacy to sign language education, by hinting that sign languages may qualify as an optional third language choice for hearing students. NCERT in March 2006 published a chapter on sign language in a class III textbook, emphasising the fact that it is a language like any other and is "yet another mode of communication." The aim was to create healthy attitudes towards the disabled.

Strenuous efforts have been made by Deaf communities, NGO's, researchers and other organisations working for people with hearing disabilities, including the All India Federation of Deaf (AIFD), National association of the Deaf (NAD) in the direction of encouraging ISL. Until 2001, no formal classes for teaching ISL were conducted in India. During this period, Ali Yavar Jung National Institute of Hearing and the Handicapped (AYJNIHH), Mumbai, established an ISL cell. It started a course called "Diploma in India Sign Language Interpreter Course". The curriculum designed for the course aims to develop professional communication in Sign language and ability to interpret professionally. It also focused on the basic understanding of the Deaf community and Deaf culture. Later, the course was offered in the regional centers, in Hyderabad, Bhubaneswar, Kolkata and Delhi.

Besides AYJNIHH, organisations like the Mook Badhir Sangathan in Indore and several other organisations offer ISL classes. Many NGOs all over the India use ISL to teach English and various academic and vocational courses. These NGOs include ISHARA (Mumbai), Deaf Way Foundation (Delhi), the Noida Deaf Society and Leadership Education Empowerment of the Deaf (LEED) (Pune), Speaking Hands Institute for the Deaf (Punjab), etc. (Randhawa, 2014). The associations like the Association of Sign Language Interpreters (ASLI) and the Indian Sign Language Interpreters Association (ISLIA) were established in 2006 and 2008 respectively for the professional development of interpreters in India. Two schools have been established in India which follow bilingual approach to teach deaf students. The schools are the Bajaj Institute of Learning (BIL) in Dehradun and Mook Badhir Sangathan in Indore. Apart from the establishment of organisations working for Deaf people there has been a spurt in research on sign language in India. Recent research developments include the studies by research scholars of the Jawaharlal Nehru University (JNU) and the Delhi University including Wallang, 2007; Sinha, 2003, 2008/2013; Hidam, 2010; Kulsheshtra, 2013. There is also work on problems and awareness of IPSL and typology of IPSL verbs (Morgan 2009,2010). Apart from these there have been continued works by scholars on linguistic aspects of IPSL as well as on varieties of IPSL (Bhattacharya and Hidam 2010, Aboh, Pfau, and Zeshan 2005, Zeshan and Panda 2011, Panda 2011, Panda 2012). Steps taken by the Government of India to promote sign language include the establishment of the ISLRTC. However, currently the autonomy of the Research centre is a contentious issue, which is yet to be resolved.

=== Pakistan ===
Pakistan has a deaf population of 0.24 million, which is approximately 7.4% of the overall disabled population in the country.

== Varieties ==
There are many varieties of sign language in the region, including many pockets of home sign and local sign languages, such as Ghandruk Sign Language, Jhankot Sign Language, and Jumla Sign Language in Nepal, and Alipur Sign Language in India, which appear to be language isolates. There are also various Sri Lankan sign languages which may not even be related to each other. However, the urban varieties of India, Pakistan, Nepal (Nepalese Sign Language), and Bangladesh are clearly related (although, for Nepalese Sign Language at least, it is not clear whether the relation is genetic, or perhaps rather one of borrowing compounded by extensive incorporation of a shared South Asian gestural base). There is disagreement whether these related varieties should be considered separate languages.

- Woodward (1992a) researched the vocabulary of the sign language varieties in Karachi (Sindh, Pakistan), Delhi (NCT, India), Bombay (Maharashtra, India), Bangalore (Karnataka, India) and Calcutta (West Bengal, India). He found cognacy rates of 62–71% between the Karachi vocabulary on the one hand and the four Indian vocabularies on the other, and concluded that 'sign language varieties in India and Pakistan are distinct but closely related language varieties belonging to the same language family'.
- Woodward (1993) expanded on his 1992 research by comparing the results from India and Pakistan with new data from Nepal, tentatively concluding that the sign language varieties of India, Pakistan, Nepal and probably also Bangladesh and Sri Lanka are so closely related that they may, in fact, constitute a single sign language.
- Ulrike Zeshan (2000), based on her own research in Karachi and New Delhi, concluding that their grammar was identical and there were only small differences in vocabulary, proposed that the Indian and Pakistani varieties constitute a single language, introduced the term 'Indo-Pakistani Sign Language' and emphatically rejected the notion of separate Indian and Pakistani sign languages.
- The ISO 639-3 standard categorises these varieties as three separate sign languages in India and Bangladesh, Pakistan, and Nepal. Ethnologue (2016), which follows the ISO standard, acknowledges the relatedness of these varieties as well as the controversy over whether they are one language or many. They identify the following variety within India: Bangalore-Chennai-Hyderabad Sign Language, Mumbai-Delhi Sign Language and Kolkata Sign Language.
- Johnson and Johnson (2016) found in a comparative study of signs used in Delhi, Kolkata, and Dhaka that the language used in Delhi was different enough from that of the cities in Bengal to impede mutual intelligibility. Enough similarities were observed between the signs used in Kolkata and Dhaka to demonstrate decisively that these cities use the same sign language variety.

While the sign system in IPSL appears to be largely indigenous, elements in IPSL are derived from British Sign Language (BSL). For example, most IPSL signers nowadays use fingerspelling based on BSL fingerspelling, with only isolated groups using an indigenous Devanagari-based fingerspelling system (for example, Deaf students and graduates of the school for the deaf in Vadodara/Baroda, Gujarat). In addition, more recently contact with foreign Deaf has resulted in rather extensive borrowing from International Signs and (either directly or via International Signs) from American Sign Language (ASL). A small number of the Deaf in and around Bengaluru are often said to use ASL (owing to a longstanding ASL deaf school there); however it is probably more correct to say that they use a lexicon based largely on ASL (or Signed English), while incorporating also a not inconsequential IPSL element. Furthermore, regardless of the individual signs used, the grammar used is clearly IPSL and not ASL.

The Delhi Association for the Deaf is reportedly working with Jawaharlal Nehru University to identify a standard sign language for India.

== History ==
=== Early history ===
Although discussion of sign languages and the lives of deaf people is extremely rare in the history of South Asian literature, there are a few references to deaf people and gestural communication in texts dating from antiquity. Symbolic hand gestures known as mudras have been employed in religious contexts in Hinduism, Buddhism and Zoroastrianism for many centuries, although Buddhism have often excluded deaf people from participation in a ritual or religious membership. In addition, classical Indian dance and theatre often employs stylised hand gestures with particular meanings.

An early reference to gestures used by deaf people for communication appears in a 12th-century Islamic legal commentary, the Hidayah. In the influential text, deaf (or "dumb") people have legal standing in areas such as bequests, marriage, divorce and financial transactions, if they communicate habitually with intelligible signs.

Early in the 20th century, a high incidence of deafness was observed among communities of the Naga hills. As has happened elsewhere in such circumstances (see, for example, Al-Sayyid Bedouin Sign Language), a village sign language had emerged and was used by both deaf and hearing members of the community. Ethnologist and political officer John Henry Hutton wrote:

As one might expect ... of men without the art of writing, the language of signs has reached a high state of development... To judge how highly developed is this power of communicating by signs, etc., it is necessary only to experience a Naga interpreter's translation of a story or a request told to him in sign language by a dumb man. ... Indeed the writer has known a dumb man make a long and detailed complaint of an assault in which nothing was missing except proper names, and even these were eventually identified by means of the dumb man's description of his assailants' dress and personal appearance.

However, it is unlikely that any of these sign systems are related to modern IPSL, and deaf people were largely treated as social outcasts throughout the Indian history.

=== Residential deaf schools ===
Documented deaf education began with welfare services, mission schools and orphanages from the 1830s, and "initially worked with locally-devised gestural or signed communication, sometimes with simultaneous speech." Later in the 19th century, residential deaf schools were established, and they tended (increasingly) to adopt an oralist approach over the use of sign language in the classroom. These schools included The Bombay Institution for Deaf-Mutes, which was founded by Bishop Leo Meurin in the 1880s, and schools in Madras and Calcutta which opened in the 1890s. Other residential schools soon followed, such as the "School for Deaf and Dumb Boys" at Mysore, founded in 1902, a school in Dehiwala in what is now Sri Lanka, founded in 1913, and "The Ida Rieu School for blind, deaf, dumb and other defective children", founded in 1923 in Karachi, in what is now Pakistan.

While a few students who were unable to learn via the oralist method were taught with signs, many students preferred to communicate with each other via sign language, sometimes to the frustration of their teachers. The first study of the sign language of these children, which is almost certainly related to modern IPSL, was in 1928 by British teacher H. C. Banerjee. She visited three residential schools for deaf children, at Dhaka, Barisal and Kolkata, observing that "in all these schools the teachers have discouraged the growth of the sign language, which in spite of this official disapproval, has grown and flourished." She compared sign vocabularies at the different schools and described the signs in words in an appendix.

A rare case of a public event conducted in sign language was reported by a mission in Palayamkottai in 1906: "Our services for the Deaf are chiefly in the sign language, in which all can join alike, whether learning Tamil, as those do who belong to the Madras Presidency, or English, which is taught to those coming from other parts."

== Grammar ==
Despite the common assumption that Indo-Pakistani Sign Language is the manual representation of spoken English or Hindi, it is in fact unrelated to either language and has its own grammar. Zeshan (2014) discusses three aspects of IPSL: its lexicon, syntax and spatial grammar. Some distinct features of IPSL that differ from other sign languages include:

- Number Signs: The numbers from zero to nine are formed in IPSL by holding up a hand with the appropriate handshape for each number. From one to five the corresponding number of extended fingers forms the numeral sign, whereas for zero and the numbers from six to nine special handshapes are used that derive from written numbers. Ten may either be expressed by two 5-hands or by '1+0'. (Zeshan, 2000)
- Family Relationship: The signs for family relationship are preceded by the sign for 'male/man' and 'female/woman'.

man sibling
brother

woman sibling
sister

- Sign families: Several signs belong to same family if they share one or more parameters including handshapes, place of articulation and movement.
  - Pass and fail have the same handshape, but move in opposite directions.
  - Money, pay and rich have the same handshape, but different places of articulation and movement patterns.
  - Think, know and understand use the same place of articulation, viz, the head.
- The IPSL consists of various non-manual gestures including mouth pattern, mouth gesture, facial expression, body posture, head position and eye gaze (Zeshan, 2001)
- There is no temporal inflection in IPSL. The past, present and future is depicted by using signs for before, then, and after.
- Question words like what or where are placed at the end of a sentence.

BANK WHERE
bank WH
Where is the bank?

SICK WHO
sick WH
Who is sick?

- The use of space is a crucial feature of IPSL.

Sentences are always predicate final, and all of the signs from the open lexical classes can function as predicates. Ellipsis is extensive, and one-word sentences are common. There is a strong preference for sentences with only one lexical argument. Constituent order does not play any role in the marking of grammatical relations. These are coded exclusively by spatial mechanisms (e.g., directional signs) or inferred from the context. Temporal expressions usually come first in the sentence, and if there is a functional particle, it always follows the predicate (e.g., YESTERDAY FATHER DIE COMPLETIVE – "(My) father died yesterday").

== Popular culture ==
Indo-Pakistani Sign Language has appeared in numerous Indian films such as:

- Koshish, 1972 film about a deaf couple
- Mozhi, 2007 film about the love story of a deaf and mute girl
- Khamoshi: The Musical, a 1996 film about a deaf couple with a daughter who becomes a musician
- Black, a 2005 film about a blind and deaf girl based in part on the life of Helen Keller

== Computational resources ==
There has been some significant amount of research on sign language recognition, but with much less focus for Indian sign language. Due to the political divide, Indian and Pakistani sign languages are generally perceived different, hence leading to fragmented research. There have been a few initiatives that gather open resources for Indian and Pakistani SLs.

== See also ==
- Angami Naga Sign Language
