= Deafness in Pakistan =

The experience of Deaf and hard-of-hearing individuals in Pakistan is influenced by a wide range of social and cultural experiences. This experience is also shaped by the role of civil and human rights, access to healthcare and education, and the preservation of their sign language--Pakistan Sign Language (PSL). While there have been improvements in access to these facilities and the overall access to society, Pakistan has identified several objectives to continue supporting and accommodating its DHH population.

== Pakistan Sign Language ==
Pakistan Sign Language (PSL), also known as Isharon Ki Zubann in Urdu, is the primary language used by the Deaf community in Pakistan, classified as a Deaf community sign language. Other abbreviations for PSL include “pks,” which is the international standard code. PSL is historically connected to the broader group of related signed languages across the Indian subcontinent, known as Indo-Pakistani Sign Language (IPSL), and there is some research that suggests the languages under this group are nearly identical, with only some variations in vocabulary.

PSL is widely used among Deaf communities, educational institutions, between families, and community organizations across the country. While there may be regional differences in vocabulary and other signing practices, many signs are shared across communities and are understood widely among PSL users. The exact number of PSL users is uncertain, as national statistics do not consistently distinguish between those who have hearing loss and those who use sign language. There is some evidence that the broader IPSL signing community consists of several hundred thousand people, however this is not an accurate representation of the current population of PSL users in Pakistan alone. A more recent study in 2022 estimated that over 250,000 Deaf Pakistanis use PSL.

In 2022, through the Access to the Media (Deaf) Persons Act, PSL received explicit legal recognition as the preferred language of Pakistan’s Deaf community and acknowledged its status to be the same as other minority languages. However, Pakistan Sign Language is not considered an official language of Pakistan.

=== Language acquisition and deprivation ===
In many cases, language development may come from outside the home, such as schools or community participation; this is particularly true in the case of Deaf and hard-of-hearing children learning a sign language. Many Deaf children are born into hearing families that have very limited prior knowledge of sign language, making involvement with the Deaf community and educational opportunities especially important for language development. In Pakistan, this access is complicated by delayed identification of hearing loss and inadequate access to sign language education.

== Human and civil rights ==
Before Pakistan signed the United Nations Convention on the Rights of Persons with Disabilities (CRPD) in 2008, several domestic laws and policies had already been established to improve the rights and quality of life of individuals with disabilities, including Deaf and hard-of-hearing people.

Article 38(d) of Pakistan’s constitution, authenticated in April 1973, established a responsibility to provide basic necessities, including medical care and education, to its citizens that were unable to earn an income or work due to “infirmity”, illness, or unemployment. Although the word “disability” was not explicitly written in the text, nor was the inclusion of Deaf and hard-of-hearing persons directly mentioned in the document, the term “infirmity” was used to encompass physical, mental, and intellectual disabilities. Subsequent legislations include the Disabled Persons (Employment and Rehabilitation) Ordinance of 1981, which recognized deafness and established protections for employment and rehabilitation, and the National Plan of Action for Persons with Disabilities, 2006 (in response to the National Policy for Persons with Disabilities of 2002), which expanded national policies regarding education, employment, healthcare and overall accessibility.

Pakistan signed the CRPD on September 28, 2008 and ratified it on July 5, 2011, formally accepting its obligations to protect the rights of individuals with disabilities, including Deaf and hard-of-hearing people. However, as of 2025, Pakistan has not ratified the CRPD’s Optional Protocol, which limits access to formal individuals communications and inquiry procedures.

In 2010, the Eighteenth Amendment to the Constitution of Pakistan transferred greater responsibility for decisions regarding healthcare, education, and disability-related services to the provincial governments of Pakistan. As a result, policies and implementation of disability rights may vary across the country.

The four provinces of Pakistan and their corresponding disability-rights legislated are:

- Sindh: The Sindh Empowerment of Persons with Disabilities Act (2018)
- Balochistan: The Balochistan Persons with Disabilities Act (2017)
- Punjab: The Punjab Empowerment of Persons with Disabilities Act (2022)
- Khyber Pakhtunkhwa: Khyber Pakhtunkhwa Empowerment of Persons with Disabilities Bill/Act (which remains under consideration as of 2026)
- Islamabad Capital Territory: The Islamabad Capital Territory (ICT) Rights of Persons with Disability Act (2020)

These legal frameworks provide legal protections for individuals with disabilities, though implementation may differ across jurisdictions.

While Islamabad is technically not a province of Pakistan, it is a federally administered territory controlled by the national government, which necessitates a separate legal framework. Under the ICT Rights of Persons with Disabilities Act, Islamabad established a Medical Assessment Board (MAB) to evaluate applicants and issue official medical assessment certificates. These certificates enable disabled individuals to apply for Pakistan’s special Computerized National Identity Card (CNIC) issued by the National Database and Registration Authority (NADRA), which formally recognizes the card-holder’s disability status and facilitates access to disability-related benefits and services. This includes employment opportunities under the 2% quota reserved for disabled individuals, access to special education, healthcare, and welfare programs. Since its establishment in 2021, Islamabad’s Medical Assessment Board has distributed 19,380 disability certificates, under which hearing impairment is explicitly recognized as one of the categories eligible for certification.

Despite these legal developments, the practical accessibility of disability rights remains limited. In 2026, the UNCRPD conducted a review on Pakistan, finding that there are several continuing barriers to accessible information, communication, and public services, particularly for those with sensory disabilities such as hearing loss. For example, while the Access to the Media (Deaf) Persons Act of 2022 established requirements for Pakistan Sign Language (PSL) interpretation in television programming, access to these services and captioning remains inconsistent. In response, the Committee recommended expansions of interpreter training programs and greater accessibility in healthcare, education, judicial services, and public information. They also suggested increasing Deaf and hard-of-hearing participation in policy development. The Committee also identified barriers such as limited sign language accessibility at public events, affecting participation in political and cultural activities.

== Newborn hearing screening ==
Newborn hearing screening is not universally implemented and remains limited, with services only available at select healthcare facilities. Major barriers include inadequate healthcare infrastructure, limited funding for services, shortages of trained professionals, and insufficient referral and follow-up systems. Additionally, limited national coordination and public awareness of the need for hearing screenings has contributed to gaps in early detection of hearing loss.

The limited availability of newborn hearing screening has contributed to delayed identification of hearing loss. In 2017, a study involving 125 families in Islamabad and Lahore found that only 6% of participants reported receiving newborn hearing screening, despite 76% having been born in hospitals; moreover, nearly half of the screened children were not diagnosed with hearing loss until 19-24 months of age. Only 22.4% of the newborns were diagnosed before 6 months of age.

More recent research has documented the implementation of newborn hearing screening in individual healthcare facilities. Between July 2020 and June 2021, Ittefaq Hospital in Lahore conducted a screening program involving 91 infants considered at high risk for hearing impairment. Initial screening was performed using distortion-product otoacoustic emissions (DPOAE) testing, with brainstem evoked response audiometry (BERA) used for diagnostic confirmation. Of the 91 infants screened, 19 (20.9%) were diagnosed with hearing impairment.

A larger study published in 2026 examined 5,143 newborn hearing-screening records collected from two tertiary hospitals in Karachi between 2020 and 2024. Approximately 95.6% of newborns passed their initial screening, while 4.0% required repeat testing and 0.5% were referred for additional diagnostic evaluation. The study also examined screening conducted on the third, seventh, and twenty-first days after birth, finding that screening on the seventh day produced the most favorable balance of diagnostic sensitivity and specificity within the participating hospitals.

Although these studies demonstrate that newborn screening has been made available in select healthcare institutions across the country, they do not establish comprehensive national newborn screening coverage, diagnostic follow-up, and the age at which hearing loss is most commonly identified. Limited coordination across Pakistan, uneven resource allocation, and limited public and professional awareness contribute to hindering comprehensive screening programs.

== Early intervention and hearing devices ==
Some early intervention rehabilitative services offered to the Deaf and hard-of-hearing children in Pakistan include audiological assessments, hearing aids, and cochlear implantations, speech-language therapy, and other communication support services. However, availability of these services depends on the individual provinces and healthcare institutions, with the majority of specialized healthcare and rehabilitative services available in urban areas of Pakistan, causing unequal access across the provinces and disadvantaged communities. Some financial assistance for hearing and rehabilitative services are available through government-supported disability and social welfare programs. For example, Khyber Pakhtunkhwa has reported distributing funds for technologies such as hearing aids.

Cochlear implantations are limitedly available through specialized medical institutions or public, government assistance programs. Pakistan Bait-ul-Mal is an example of a social welfare program that provides financial assistance for individuals eligible for cochlear implantation, particularly those who cannot otherwise afford such procedures. As of April 2025, the Pakistani government has reported the support of over 1,700 cochlear implantation surgeries with a total expenditure of 2.343 billion rupees. Moreover, some provinces of Pakistan have incorporated cochlear implant services into their healthcare programs. For example, as of May 2026, approximately 240 children in Khyber Pakhtunkhwa have been reported to receive free cochlear implantation services through their Sehat Card Plus program, which is KP’s leading health insurance initiative managed by the government. However, the demand for cochlear implantation services has exceeded the availability of funding and treatment capacity in many areas, creating nationwide gaps.

Following cochlear implantation, children may also require ongoing speech-language therapy, audiological follow-ups, and auditory rehabilitation to support listening and spoken-language development. However, the availability of these services remains uneven, particularly where specialist services are limited outside major urban areas. Furthermore, shortage of rehabilitation facilities and the high costs of private therapies remain as significant barriers to accessing healthcare services. Living in rural areas may further restrict access to these services.

=== Sign-language support ===
Some sign-language based support is available through some Deaf educational institutions and community organizations, which provide PSL instruction to children and families. Deaf Reach, an educational program operated by the Family Educational Services Foundation, provides sign-language and literacy instruction for parents of Deaf students to support communication and family involvement in education and development. The Pakistan Association of the Deaf also provides PSL instruction for parents and siblings through its educational programs, including classes for families of enrolled Deaf students.

== Education and employment ==
=== Primary and secondary education ===
Education for Deaf and hard-of-hearing children in Pakistan is provided through several channels, including specialized schools, inclusive education programs, and mainstream education institutions. However, this varies across provinces and particularly between urban and rural communities. Special education institutions remain the primary mode of education for children with disabilities, while inclusive education in mainstream schools is limited.

Specialized education institutions are available to Deaf and hard-of-hearing students across the country, though only some of them provide instruction in PSL. As of 2025, Punjab has 49 educational institutions specifically for children with hearing disabilities. At the national level, the National Special Education Centre for Hearing Impaired Children has provided sign-language instruction to 3,699 students.

There are several policies in Pakistan to improve educational inclusion, such as the Islamabad Declaration on Inclusive Education in 2005, among others. These measures have aimed to expand access to mainstream education, improve teacher preparation and training, and provide appropriate accommodations for children with disabilities. Provincial governments have also sought to improve education accessibility. In Sindh, 20 digital classrooms were established to support technology-based learning specifically for Deaf students. In Balochistan, over 1,900 students with hearing loss have accessed a formal education with sign languages between 2019 and 2025.

However, significant barriers to education access remain. In its 2026 review of Pakistan, the UNCRPD identified low rates of enrollment and high rates of dropout among children with disabilities, lack of access to inclusive education, and reliance on specialized institutions. As a result, the Committee recommended expanding access to mainstream education, improving teacher training, and ensuring availability of accessible educational materials such as PSL and captioning services.

=== Higher education ===
Access to higher education for students with disabilities is supported by the Higher Education Commission’s Policy for Students with Disabilities at Higher Education Institutions in Pakistan, which was introduced in 2021. This applies to both public and private institutions, offering reasonable accommodations, financial assistance, allocated admission opportunities, and institutional accessibility support.

As of 2021, according to the Higher Education Commission, 2,486 students with disabilities were enrolled in higher education institutions across Pakistan. However, this includes all disabilities and does not establish a number for Deaf or hard-of-hearing students in universities.

Despite these protections, access to sign language interpretation, captioning services for instruction material, and other communication accommodations remains inconsistent. The UNCRPD has recommended improving accessibility and inclusivity in educational institutions across all levels of education.

=== Employment and vocational training ===
Employment opportunities for DHH persons in Pakistan are supported by disability-rights laws, government employment quotas, and vocational training programs. However, unemployment rates in Pakistan remain high among individuals with disabilities and limited access to workplace accommodations create significant barriers.

Mandatory government employment quotas for those with disabilities are maintained across Pakistan, however the requirements vary across provinces. As reported in 2025, Khyber Pakhtunkhwa and the federal government reserve 2% of government positions for individuals with disabilities; Punjab reserves 3%; Sindh and Balochistan reserve 5%.

Vocational opportunities also provide opportunities for individuals with disabilities to develop occupational and technical skills. For example, in Khyber Pakhtunkhwa, approximately 1,200 individuals have graduated from government-supported vocational training programs with certified vocational skills. Across other provinces, programs provide training, employment assistance, and financial support for those interested in self-employment and entrepreneurship.

Despite these initiatives however, the employment protections remain inconsistent. In 2026, the UNCRPD identified high rates of unemployment among the disabled population, disparities in employment quotas across provinces, and insufficient enforcement of accommodations in the workplace, such as limited access to interpreters and other communication accommodations. Moreover, the Committee expressed concerns regarding reliance on vocational workshops rather than inclusive employment opportunities.

== Language endangerment and revitalization ==
=== Language vitality and endangerment status ===
Pakistan Sign Language is classified as Level 5 (Developing) on the Expanded Graded Intergenerational Disruption Scale (EGIDS), which indicates that it is an actively used language and has developing resources in language and educational systems.

According to UNESCO’s language vitality framework, intergenerational transmission, the number of language users, range of communication settings, and institutional support are important markers of a language’s continued survival. While the exact number of PSL users is unclear, the language has been used across several generations in Deaf communities, educational institutions, families, and community and social settings; however, it is not used as consistently in mainstream education, healthcare, employment, or public services.

=== Challenges to language transmission ===
Major barriers to PSL transmission include disparities in opportunities to acquire and use the language, rather than a decline in fluent signers. Most Deaf children are born into hearing families that may not already use a sign language, which requires transmission of the language to occur primarily through schools, Deaf communities, and other social organizations rather than between parents and children. However, Pakistan experiences limited access to qualified teachers, interpreters in academic settings, as well as other educational resources that delay or inhibit acquisition of PSL. A study done in 2023 involving 100 teachers of students with hearing loss identified that variances in PSL among students and lack of professional training created barriers to consistent communication in the classroom. A separate study of hearing students at university found that there is limited PSL proficiency among hearing peers, creating significant communication difficulties for Deaf students in an inclusive educational setting.

While these are significant barriers affecting accessibility and transmission of Pakistan Sign Language, PSL is not an endangered language.

=== Language preservation and development ===
Linguistic documentation, educational programs, digital resources, and government recognition have all contributed to efforts to preserve Pakistan Sign Language. Deaf Reach, an initiative operated by the Family Educational Services Foundation, has developed PSL dictionaries, instructional videos, and digital learning materials for Deaf students, families, and educational professionals. These resources incorporate regional signing varieties and aim to expand PSL education access across Pakistan.

Standardization is also a crucial element to language preservation and development. There has been research done on PSL standardization, which emphasizes the importance of educational language, improved training for interpreters, and increased institutional support. However, these initiatives require involvement of the Deaf community in Pakistan to preserve regional varieties and linguistic diversity.

Technological advancements and initiatives have also contributed to PSL documentation. A research project done in 2025 developed a dataset of fingerspelling gestures in Urdu for potential use in sign language recognition systems.

As mentioned earlier, government recognition of PSL by the Access to the Media (Deaf) Persons Act (2022) has greatly increased PSL visibility across Pakistan, as well as establishing requirements for sign language interpretation across television programs. However, the UNCRPD has identified several limitations in interpreting services and accessible public information, indicating that the implementation of this initiative is incomplete.

However, Pakistan Sign Language overall remains an actively used and developing language, not currently experiencing endangerment. Its continued survival and vitality depends on early language acquisition, transmission through Deaf communities and generations, and increased opportunities to use PSL in education, public services, and in everyday and social contexts.
