= National Deaf Federation Nepal =

Deaf organization based in Nepal

- राष्ट्रिय बहिरा महासंघ नेपाल
- Abbreviation: NDFN
- Founded: 1996; 30 years ago
- Type: Non-governmental organization
- Purpose: To lead the campaign for the rights of deaf people in Nepal
- Coordinates: 27.7212701°N 85.3204546°E
- Region served: Nepal
- Website: deafnepal.org.np
- Formerly called: National Federation of the Deaf and Hard of Hearing

The National Deaf Federation Nepal (NDFN; Nepali: राष्ट्रिय बहिरा महासंघ नेपाल^{(ne)}) is a non-governmental organization established and run as the umbrella organization for Nepal's various district and local deaf associations. Previously it was known as the National Federation of the Deaf and Hard of Hearing (NFDH). It is a member of the World Federation of the Deaf (WFD) and works as an advocate for deaf rights, as well as running a number of programs throughout the country to improve the lives of Nepal's deaf population.

Two of the core areas in which it works are sign language and deaf education. NDFN has worked on publishing a "Dictionary of Nepali Sign Language", and continues to collect and create signs for supplements to this dictionary. It also has trained and sent deaf sign language instructors to teach Nepali Sign Language to deaf who otherwise have no exposure to sign language. In the area of deaf education, it works closely with the Ministry of Education, the Department of Education, the Curriculum Development Center, and the various deaf schools in order to improve the quality of deaf education in Nepal.

== Local member Deaf associations ==
Currently, local member Deaf associations include:

- Baglung Association of the Deaf
- Banke Association of the Deaf
- Bardia Association of the Deaf
- Bhaktapur Association of the Deaf
- Bhojpur Association of the Deaf
- Chitawan Association of the Deaf
- Dhading Association of the Deaf
- Dhankuta Association of the Deaf
- Dolakha Association of the Deaf
- Dolpa Association of the Deaf
- Doti Kaili Association of the Deaf
- Gandaki Association of the Deaf
- Gorkha Association of the Deaf
- Kathmandu Association of the Deaf
- Kaili Association of the Deaf
- Kanchanpur Association of the Deaf
- Kaili Association of the Deaf
- Kavre Deaf Development Association
- Koshi Association of the Deaf
- Lalitpur Association of the Deaf
- Lamjung Association of the Deaf
- Lumbini Association of the Deaf
- Madhepachimanchal Association of the Deaf
- Mahotari Association of the Deaf
- Makwanpur Association of the Deaf
- Mechi Association of the Deaf
- Nawalparasi Association of the Deaf
- Nuwakot Association of the Deaf
- Okhaldhunga Association of the Deaf
- Parsa Association of the Deaf
- Rapti Association of the Deaf
- Rautahat Association of the Deaf
- Sarlahi Association of the Deaf
- Saptari Association of the Deaf
- Sindhuli Association of the Deaf
- Siraha Association of the Deaf
- Syangja Association of the Deaf
- Tanahun Association of the Deaf
- Therathum Association of the Deaf
- Udaypur Association of the Deaf
