= Dhimal =

Ethnic group in Eastern Terai, Nepal

धिमाल

Total population
- Nepal 25,643 (2021) India 900

Languages
- Dhimal

Religion
- Hinduism 56.1% (2011), Kiratism 40.9% (2011)

Related ethnic groups
- Limbu; Yakkha; Rai; Sunuwar; Mech; Koch; Tharu

The Dhimal or Dhemal are ethnic group residing in the eastern Terai of Nepal and West Bengal of India. They are a Sino-Tibetan-speaking ethnic group of the eastern Terai. They mainly reside in Morang and Jhapa districts of Nepal and Darjeeling district of West Bengal, India.

== Ethnicity and language ==
They are an indigenous group of Nepal and belong to Sino-Tibetan group. They are from the Koch of Terai and of the northern hills.

According to Hodgson the Mech, Bodo, Koch and Dhimal tribes are of the same race; however, comparison of language does not support so close a connection, he added. He stated that "… but it is difficult to suppose the Bodo and Dhimal languages other than primitive". He also stated that the Dhimals are "… nomadic cultivators of wild. For ages transcending memory or tradition, they have passed beyond the savage or hunter state, and also beyond the herdsman's state, and have advanced to the third or agricultural grade of social progress, but so as to indicate a not entirely broken connection with the precedent condition of things … They never cultivate the same field beyond the second year, or remain in the same village beyond from four to six years". He again identified the barter system for the few things which they require and do not produce themselves.

== Language ==
Dhimal people speak Dhimal language which is part of the Sino-Tibetan family. According to the census of 2021 there are 20,583 speakers of Dhimal language. It has its own script called Dham script. There is an eastern and western dialect, which are separated by the Kankai River. It is also closely related to another aboriginal language of the Himalayas called Toto.

== Religion and culture ==
Their animistic religion is very close to the Kirant religion. They worship nature and other household gods. Hodgson identified their religion as the religion of nature, or rather, the natural religion of man have neither temple nor idol; their cultivation as shifting cultivation; and "this race assure him that they once had chiefs when they dwelt as a united people in Morang".

The religion, as identified by Hodgson, is very different from Hinduism as they have neither temples nor idols. "Altogether, their religion belongs to the same primitive era as their habits and manners", Hodgson added.

== Geographic distribution ==
The Central Bureau of Statistics of Nepal classifies the Dhimal as a subgroup within the broader social group of Terai Janajati. At the time of the 2011 Nepal census, 26,298 people (0.09% of the population of Nepal) were Dhimal. The frequency of Dhimals by province was as follows:

- Koshi Province (0.6%)
- Bagmati Province (0.0%)
- Gandaki Province (0.0%)
- Lumbini Province (0.0%)
- Madhesh Province (0.0%)
- Karnali Province (0.0%)
- Sudurpashchim Province (0.0%)

The frequency of Dhimals was higher than national average (0.09%) in the following districts:

- Morang (1.2%)
- Jhapa (1.1%)
- Sunsari (0.5%)

In India, they reside in 16 villages, namely Naxalbari and Hatighisha in Darjeeling district, West Bengal.

== Occupation ==
Dhimals are cultivators, although the frequencies of labourers, including agricultural labourers or to some extent tea garden labourers, may not be overlooked. These days the Indian Dhimals are exclusively concentrated at Hatighisha and Maniram Gram Panchayat of Naxalbari Police Station under Darjeeling district of West Bengal, India. However, sporadic occurrences of Dhimal population may have seen outside the above-said areas but within Darjeeling district of West Bengal. Even this diminutive group sometimes misleads as vanishing races by some amateurs. Their counterpart of Nepal, with whom they have a marital relation and belongs to the same (biological) population, have better numerical strength, socio-economic and educational attainment of their own. The Dhimals of Nepal receive much importance in various writings of Nepali scholars. On the other hand, the Indian Dhimals have been neglected by the government and others in any field of development. Anthropological documents on the Indian Dhimal is yet to be received; some sporadic documents by amateurs and some field-based study by trained scholars in a part of Dhimal population may be available but all of them cover social-cultural-linguistics aspects only, and physical or demographic data on the entire population are literally absent.

== Research ==
The first identified study on Dhimal of this region may be attributed to English administrators of British India. As per present knowledge the first report in the form of monograph on Dhimal was written by Brain Houghton Hodgson (1847) entitled "Essays the first on the Kocch, Bodo and Dhimal Tribes". The monograph dealt with the Vocabulary, Grammar and Location, Numbers, Creed, Customs, Condition and Physical and Moral Characteristics of the People. Later on Hodgson published the third part in 1849 in Journal of Asiatic Society, entitled "On the Origin, Location, Numbers, Creed, Customs, Characters and Condition of the Kocch, Bodo and Dhimal People, with a general description of the climate they dwelt in" (Hodgson 1849). Trubner and Co. in 1880 published the same original collection of 1847 in the book entitled "Miscellaneous Essays relating to Indian Subjects, Vol-I" (Hodgson 1880).

Hodgson enumerated the number of Dhimals between Konki and Dhorla as below 15,000. Hodgson stated that Dhimal "…do not now exceed 15,000 souls, are at present confined to that portion of Saul forest lying between the Konki and the Dharla or Torsha, mixed with the Bodo but in separate villages and without intermarriage".

Latham (1859) in ‘Descriptive Ethnology’ identified the place of Dhimals as unfavourable and full of malaria, though, he stated "…yet the Dhimal, the Bodo, and others thrive in it, love it, leave it with regret". He believes that Dhimals are separated from Bodos as language, pantheons, marriage ceremony, funerals even festivals of the two are very different. Latham also identified Hodgson's work as "a model of an ethnological monograph". After that all writings are more or less influenced by and borrowed data from Hodgson's writings. Among them the writing of Edward Twite Dalton (1872) may be mentioned.

Dalton in his ‘Descriptive Ethnology of Bengal’ identified Dhimals as tribe of Assam valley, clubbed with the Kacharis or Bodo and Mech; and stated " Hodgson describes the Bodo and Dhimal tribe as of the same race, and there appears no reason for separating them in a work of this nature, as their customs, religion, etc. appear nearly identical".

W. W. Hunter (1876) in "Statistical Account of Bengal" stated that census report distinguishes between these peoples (Dhimals and Meches or Bodos), and returns the number of Dhimals at 873. Later on he wrote a brief note on Dhimal culture which are, as per Hunter, is a condensed form of Hodgson's work. Sannial (1880) when studied Dhimals found hunting and pastoralism as their main source of occupation. He also stated that the village was headed by a headman called ‘Mondal’ and magico-religious practices by Dhami, Deushi and Ojha.

Dhimal again finds their position in H. H. Risley's "The Tribes and Castes of Bengal" where Risley pointed out that "Dhimal, Dhemal, Maulik, a non-Aryan tribe of the Darjeeling and Nepal Terai …. belong to the same main stock with Kocch … rapidly losing their tribal identity by absorption into the large heterogeneous Rajbansi caste". He also pointed out a marked advanced direction towards Hinduism from nature worship. Risley opined that "they seem likely to disappear altogether as a separate tribe within the next generation" (Risley, 1891).

Bandyopadhyay (1895) in his Darjeeling Probasir Patra stated that the cultural aspects of Meches and Dhimals are more or less same, even the folklore, Bandyopadhyay collected, indicates the same origin of Dhimals with Koch and Meches.

O’Malley (1907) in his ‘District Gazetteers of Darjeeling’ classified Dhimals as non-Hinduized Koch or Rajbansi and identified their (Dhimal) habitat as "marshy tract, formerly covered by dense malarious jungle, in which aboriginal tribes of Meches, Dhimals and Koches burnt clearings and raised their scanty crops of rice and cotton on a system, if system it can be called, of nomadic husbandry".

Grierson (1926) in ‘Linguistic Survey of India’ classified Dhimal language as ‘Eastern Pronominalized group’ of ‘Pronominalized Himalayan Group’ under ‘Tibeto Himalaya Branch’ of ‘Tibeto-Burman subfamily’ which may be categorized under ‘Tibeto-Chinese group’. He also stated that "In the Pronominalized group the influence of the ancient Munda language is far more apparent". Endle (1911) placed Dhimals under Northern groups of Kachari family along with Kachari, Rabha, Mech, Koch and others.

Later on Das (1978) examined the same and opined the possibility of same ethnological relationship between these tribes. Deb Burman and Chaudhuri (1999) identified Dhimals as a backward community having tribal origin and "acceptance of Mallick or Maulik title as well as adoption of Hindu religious practices is the stereotype for not considering them tribe. But the strong argument in favour of noninclusion of the Dhimals in the list of Scheduled Castes and Scheduled Tribes of India could be their migration to the neighboring countries like Nepal and Bhutan at the time of enumeration", they added. Roy (1999) in his unpublished M.Phil. dissertation noted the prevalence of ‘barter system’ in Dhimal community of this region.

Some recent studies on vernacular language also exhibit the above stated characteristics, many of which are typical tribal characters of their own. Moitra (2004) identified a close affinity between Dhimal and Toto languages; he even calculated the separation of Toto from Dhimal, by grutochronological analysis, as 800-1200 AD. Royburman (1959) in his thesis on Toto also highlighted the same by stated "there is one variant of Toto myth of origin which refers to the Dhimals as the mother group. (Toto) assess the very close affinity exists between the language of the Totos and the Dhimal" but, he added, "as, however, I do not possess any scientifically assessed data, I do not propose to enter into the realm of social psychology". King (1994) after his linguistic survey opined that its (Dhimal) closest relative appears to be Toto (IIAS 2007).

Among Nepali scholars who have done ethnographical and social-cultural aspects on Nepali Dhimals the following names is of great important. Bista (1980) identified Dhimals as nomadic, practicing shifting cultivation until some times ago, they have traditional village councils with a headman called Deonia and the priest who presides over all of the religious function is called Dhami. Regmi (1991) identified a total of 13 exogamous patrilineal clans and 11 sub-clans within the population. Gautam and Thapa-Magar (1994) also classified Dhimals as Tribes in their work "Tribal Ethnography of Nepal". In a recent work Bisht and Bankoti (2004) also followed the same trend by placing Dhimals on "Encyclopedic Ethnography of the Himalayan Tribes". There is a continuous census enumeration on Dhimal population (or sometimes language spoken) up to 1951 except 1941. The 1872 census identified Dhimals as Aboriginal Tribe. The 1891 census headed by O’Donnell identified Dhimals as Forest and Hill Tribes as well as Agriculturalist by occupation. But next census headed by E. A. Gait classified Dhimals as Hindu by religion; even the census stated that they (Dhimals) often called themselves as Rajbansi.

The same trend was carried over by 1931 census headed by Porter. The 1961 census has lost Dhimal data but even it stated Dhimals as Aboriginal tribes as per 1872. After that no single census (1971, 1981, 1991, 2001) have been drawing any traces on Dhimal community or languages, though some very small population even with single household was being considered for the study Now, after a transitional non-recognition period by the Govt. they have been classified as Other Backward Class (OBC) of West Bengal. The history of study (or not to study) on Dhimals of India narrate the negligence for which the once non-Aryan tribe of British India having no reservation on any field, have to compete with others (the recognition as OBC is a recent one, though they are not satisfied with present status and demand the status of Scheduled Tribe instead of OBCs). Because of the uneven competitions with dominant next door neighbours and others in respect of nation, push them much behind whether in the field of education, occupation or sociocultural context as a whole. Very few of them (thirteen in number) have crossed the border of Secondary education, and two of them are graduates.
