= Signed Nepali =

Pidgin form of Nepali Sign Language

Signed Nepali or Sign-Supported Nepali, is a means of communication often used by (nominally) signing hearing individuals in their interactions with signing deaf, or by deaf persons who for whatever reason acquired Nepali as their mother tongue and then acquired Nepali Sign Language subsequently, or by deaf persons with people with normal hearing whose signing is judged not to be fully fluent (i.e. not Nepali Sign Language).

Signed Nepali is a pidgin form of Nepali Sign Language commonly used by people with normal hearing who (nominally) sign in their interactions with deaf people. It is also commonly used by those deaf persons who acquired Nepali Sign Language later in life and for whom Nepali is their first language (L1) and Nepali Sign Language is a second language (L2). Although schools for the deaf in Nepal theoretically use Nepali Sign Language as their medium of instruction (alongside written Nepali), in practice and in fact, the majority of classes are conducted in some version of Sign-Supported Nepali, as a Simultaneous Communication (or so-called Total Communication) approach is widely practiced. (Such practices have been documented by Hoffmann-Dilloway (2008). Although the deaf themselves, as articulated by representative organizations such as the National Deaf Federation Nepal and Kathmandu Association of the Deaf, value natural sign language (i.e. Nepali Sign Language) most highly, teachers at schools for the deaf (including sometimes teachers who are themselves deaf) tend to value only signing which follow the grammar of Nepali, i.e. Sign-Supported Nepali.

Generally speaking, Signed Nepali is neither Nepali nor Nepali Sign Language, but rather a compromise between the two, using the lexicon of the latter (but little or none of its grammar), and the word order (and some, but in practice rarely very much, of the grammar) of the former. As such, it is less than a full language, lacking in both morphology and syntax, and thus generally tends to be not fully comprehensible to the majority of deaf signers. In this, it is similar to other manually coded languages, such as various versions of Signed English.
