= Initialized sign =

Handshape sign for finger spelling in the sign language

In sign language, an initialized sign is one that is produced with a handshape(s) that corresponds to the fingerspelling of its equivalent in the locally dominant oral language, based on the respective manual alphabet representing that oral language's orthography. The handshape(s) of these signs then represent the initial letter of their written equivalent(s). In some cases, this is due to the local oral language having more than one equivalent to a basic sign. For example, in ASL, the signs for "class" and "family" are the same (a basic sign for 'group of people'), except that "class" is signed with a 'C' handshape, and "family" with an 'F' handshape. In other cases initialization is required for disambiguation, though the signs are not semantically related. For example, in ASL, "water" is signed with a 'W' handshape touching the mouth, while "dentist" is similar apart from using a 'D' handshape. In other cases initialization is not used for disambiguation; the ASL sign for "elevator", for example, is an 'E' handshape moving up and down along the upright index finger of the other hand.

The large number of initialized signs in ASL and French Sign Language is partly a legacy of Abbé de l'Épée's system of Methodical Sign (les signes méthodiques), in which the handshapes of most signs were changed to correspond to the initial letter of their translation in the local oral language, and (in the case of ASL) partly a more recent influence of Manually Coded English.

== Use in Sign Languages ==
Sign languages make use of initialized signs to different degrees. Some, such as Taiwanese Sign Language and Hong Kong Sign Language have none at all, as they have no manual alphabets and thus no fingerspelling. In Japanese Sign Language, there are kana-based initialized signs that contain only the first mora of the equivalent Japanese word. For example, the sign for 'feeling' in JSL incorporates the Kana character 'KI' of Japanese manual syllabary as in Japanese kimochi (気持ち). However, only signs following the phonological constraints are accepted by native signers.

In ASL, initialized signs are typically considered "hearing" signs, used in schools to help students acquire English, though some such as "water" above are thoroughly assimilated. In Mexican Sign Language, however, initialized signs are much more numerous, and are more fully integrated into the language. This is also the case with Nepali Sign Language, and are perhaps one of the most noticeable structural differences between the lexicon of Nepali Sign Language and that of neighboring Indo-Pakistani Sign Language, which (perhaps in part due to its two-handed manual alphabet) has significantly far fewer initialized signs, but a fair number of "sequential initializations (i.e., compound signs composed of the initial letter of the word either preceding or following a sign, e.g. "C" + BOSS = CAPTAIN in IPSL).

== See also ==
- Mouthing
- Acronym
