= Nepalese language =

Nepalese language may refer to:

- Nepali language, or Gorkhali, the official language of modern Nepal
- Newari language, or Nepal Bhasa, the historical language of Kathmandu

== See also ==
- Languages of Nepal
