= Naxal School for the Deaf =

Nepali school

Naxal School for the Deaf (Nepali: ) is the first school for the deaf established in the (then) Kingdom of Nepal. It was originally established in 1966 in a room in a local hospital by an ENT doctor, but soon moved to its current site in Bal Mandir.

Originally, the teaching philosophy was oralist, and when it was first established there was an American Peace Corps volunteer who provided auditory and speech training. A Total Communication approach was adopted starting in 1988. Although the current stated methodology is Bilingualism in Nepali Sign Language and Nepali, in fact the instructional practice would better be termed Simultaneous Communication (also known as SimCom or Sign Supported Speech)), using a form of Sign-Supported Nepali, with genuine Nepali Sign Language used by pupils and only rarely by teachers in class.

The school currently teaches classes through SLC, as well as Plus 2 classes, and is planning to set up a B.Ed. course in the near future. Popular actress of Nepal, Namrata Shrestha helped the school recently by celebrating her 27th Birthday at the school.
