= Sunuwar (Unicode block) =

- Range: U+11BC0..U+11BFF (64 code points)
- Plane: SMP
- Scripts: Sunuwar
- Assigned: 44 code points
- Unused: 20 reserved code points

Unicode version history
- 16.0 (2024): 44 (+44)

Unicode documentation
- Code chart ∣ Web page

Sunuwar is a Unicode block containing letters for the Sunuwar alphabet, developed in 1942 to write the Sunwar language.

Sunuwar^{[1]}^{[2]} Official Unicode Consortium code chart (PDF)
	0	1	2	3	4	5	6	7	8	9	A	B	C	D	E	F
U+11BCx	𑯀	𑯁	𑯂	𑯃	𑯄	𑯅	𑯆	𑯇	𑯈	𑯉	𑯊	𑯋	𑯌	𑯍	𑯎	𑯏
U+11BDx	𑯐	𑯑	𑯒	𑯓	𑯔	𑯕	𑯖	𑯗	𑯘	𑯙	𑯚	𑯛	𑯜	𑯝	𑯞	𑯟
U+11BEx	𑯠	𑯡														
U+11BFx	𑯰	𑯱	𑯲	𑯳	𑯴	𑯵	𑯶	𑯷	𑯸	𑯹						
Notes: 1. As of Unicode version 16.0; 2. Grey areas indicate non-assigned code points

== History ==
The following Unicode-related documents record the purpose and process of defining specific characters in the Sunuwar block:

Version	Final code points (Note: Proposed code points and characters names may differ from final code points and names)	Count	L2 ID	WG2 ID	Document
16.0	U+11BC0..11BE1, 11BF0..11BF9	44	L2/10-466	N3962	Pandey, Anshuman (2011-01-25), Preliminary Proposal to Encode the Jenticha Script in ISO/IEC 10646
16.0	U+11BC0..11BE1, 11BF0..11BF9	44	L2/11-042		Anderson, Deborah; McGowan, Rick; Whistler, Ken (2011-02-02), "6. Jenticha", Review of Indic related L2 documents and Recommendations to the UTC
16.0	U+11BC0..11BE1, 11BF0..11BF9	44	L2/11-218	N4028	Pandey, Anshuman (2011-05-31), Proposal to Encode the Jenticha Script
16.0	U+11BC0..11BE1, 11BF0..11BF9	44	L2/11-298		Anderson, Deborah; McGowan, Rick; Whistler, Ken (2011-07-27), "5. Jenticha", South Asian subcommittee report
16.0	U+11BC0..11BE1, 11BF0..11BF9	44	L2/21-174		Anderson, Deborah; Whistler, Ken; Pournader, Roozbeh; Liang, Hai (2021-10-01), "9 Sunuwar", Recommendations to UTC #169 October 2021 on Script Proposals
16.0	U+11BC0..11BE1, 11BF0..11BF9	44	L2/21-157R		Pandey, Anshuman (2021-12-06), Proposal to encode the Sunuwar script in Unicode
16.0	U+11BC0..11BE1, 11BF0..11BF9	44	L2/22-023		Anderson, Deborah; Whistler, Ken; Pournader, Roozbeh; Constable, Peter (2022-01-22), "11 Sunuwar", Recommendations to UTC #170 January 2022 on Script Proposals
16.0	U+11BC0..11BE1, 11BF0..11BF9	44	L2/22-016		Constable, Peter (2022-04-21), "Consensus 170-C8:UTC accepts 44 Sunuwar characters", UTC #170 Minutes
16.0	U+11BC0..11BE1, 11BF0..11BF9	44	L2/22-134	N5181	Suignard, Michel (2022-06-08), ISO/IEC 10646 repertoire proposal post CDAM1.2
16.0	U+11BC0..11BE1, 11BF0..11BF9	44	L2/22-128		Anderson, Deborah; Whistler, Ken; Pournader, Roozbeh; Constable, Peter (2022-07-20), "29 Sunuwar", Recommendations to UTC #172 July 2022 on Script Proposals
16.0	U+11BC0..11BE1, 11BF0..11BF9	44	L2/22-123		McGowan, Rick (2022-07-21), "Sunuwar chart glyph error", Comments on Public Review Issues (April 11 - July 11, 2022)
16.0	U+11BC0..11BE1, 11BF0..11BF9	44	L2/22-121		Constable, Peter (2022-08-01), "Consensus 172-C8", Draft Minutes of UTC Meeting 172, "Approve the glyphs for Sunuwar as shown in the Sunuwar code chart in L2/22-134 (which corrects and supersedes the glyphs shown in the original proposal and chart in L2/21-157R)"
16.0	U+11BC0..11BE1, 11BF0..11BF9	44	L2/22-248		Anderson, Deborah; et al. (2022-10-31), "29 Sunuwar", Recommendations to UTC #173 October 2022 on Script Proposals
16.0	U+11BC0..11BE1, 11BF0..11BF9	44	L2/23-231		Constable, Peter (2023-12-08), "Note 177-N11:The Script_Extensions values suggested in L2/21-157R should not be added to the UCD ...", UTC #177 Minutes
