= Kathmandu Association of the Deaf =

Deaf organization based in Nepal

Kathmandu Association of the Deaf (KAD) is a non-governmental organization representing the deaf of Kathmandu, and is a member association of the National Federation of the Deaf Nepal. It is the first such association to be established, and in fact the first association of any kind in Nepal established by disabled people themselves and run under their own leadership and management.

Thirteen young Kathmandu deaf (the first group of students who finished what was to become the Naxal School for the Deaf) established the Deaf Development Club, which was later renamed the Deaf Welfare Association when the group applied for registry with the government in 1980. The name was again changed to Kathmandu Association of the Deaf in 1988.

One of the chief goals of KAD has been to provide rehabilitation and recreational services to deaf adults, and to promote deaf awareness among the general populace. KAD was also instrumental in early efforts to promote and further develop sign language. KAD aided work by Peace Corps to produce the first ever dictionary of Nepali Sign Language, and, with the support of UNICEF, was also instrumental in the development of a one-handed fingerspelling system for devanagari.
