= Dhimal language =

Sino-Tibetan language of Nepal

Dhimal
- धिमाल
- 'Dhimal Bhasha' in Dham and Devanagari script
- Region: Nepal
- Ethnicity: Dhimal
- Native speakers: 20,000 (2011 census)
- Language family: Sino-Tibetan: Tibeto-Burman; Kiranti (?); Dhimalish; Dhimal
- Writing system: Dham script

Language codes
- ISO 639-3: dhi
- Glottolog: dhim1246
- ELP: Dhimal
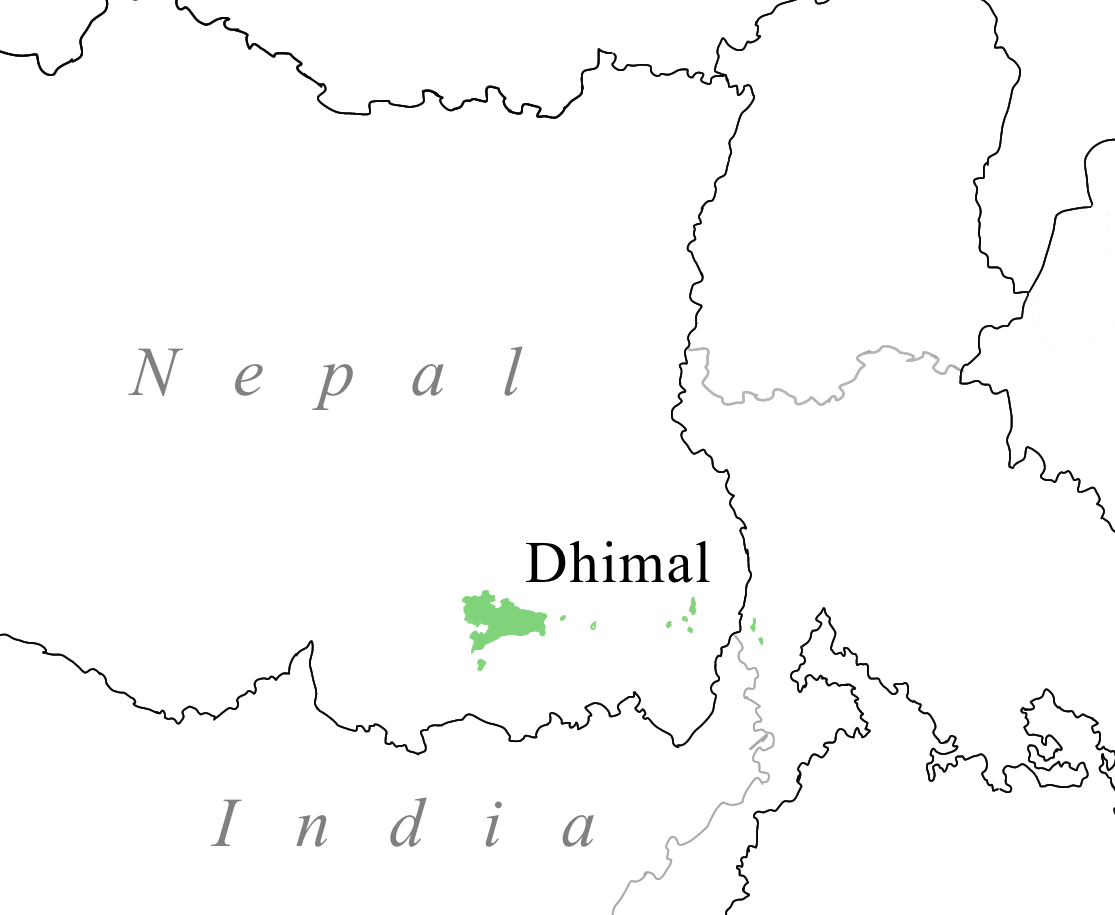
- Map of where Dhimal is spoken

Dhimal is a Sino-Tibetan language of Nepal spoken by about 20,000 people, mainly in the Terai of Koshi Province. There is an eastern and western dialect, which are separated by the Kankai River. Most people transcribe Dhimal into Devanagari and there are standard conventions for extra phonological distinctions.

== Distribution and status ==
The eastern and western dialects are separated by the Kankai River in Jhapa District. The main areas of concentration for the western dialect is between the towns of Belbari and Damak, while the eastern dialect is concentrated along the Mechi River bordering India.

Until the early 20th century, the Terai was considered a hostile environment for non-indigenous peoples and the Dhimal were thus left undisturbed. With the mass migration of hill people to the Terai came the destruction of most of the forest cover and thus the Dhimals were displaced and forced into a marginal position in society. The Dhimals have been thrust into a cash economy without specific skills or land, and their culture is thus rapidly eroding due to intermarriage with other groups and assimilation to the dominant Pahadi culture. Many Dhimal parents, especially in the eastern region, have stopped teaching their children Dhimal making the language highly endangered, likely to go extinct in two generations without revitalization efforts. Since the return of democracy to Nepal in the 1990s, the Dhimal have joined the struggle for linguistic and cultural equality being done by other Janjatis. In 1993 the Dhimal People's Development Centre in Damak was formed to revitalize Dhimal culture and in 2001 was given some government land to build a facility. Some literature has been published in the language and many of the youth are recording and posting Dhimal songs on sites like Youtube.

== Phonology ==
=== Vowels ===
Dhimal has 16 primary vowel phonemes, distinguished by length and nasality, and six diphthongs.

	Front	Central	Back
Close	i/iː/ĩ		u/uː/ũ
Mid	e/eː/ẽ	ə	o/oː/õ
Open vowel		a/aː/ɑ̃	

The diphthongs of Dhimal are /iu, ui, eu, oi, au, ai/.

=== Consonants ===
Dhimal has 31 consonants, including a four-way distinction between voiced & voiceless, aspirated (breathy in the case of voiced) and unaspirated.

		Bilabial		Alveolar		Palatal		Velar		Glottal
Nasal		m	mʱ	n	nʱ			ŋ		
Plosive	voiceless	p	pʰ	t	tʰ	c		k	kʰ	ʔ
Plosive	voiced	b	bʱ	d	dʱ	ɟ	ɟʱ	ɡ	ɡʱ	
Fricative				s						h
Approximant		w	wʱ	l	lʱ					
Trill				r	rʱ					

Dhimal also has other consonants that only appear in loanwords from Indo-Aryan languages. These are /ɖ/, /ɖʱ/, /ʈ/, /ʈʱ/, /cʰ/, /ɳ/, /ɽ/, and /ʂ/. Depending on age, these may also be realized as their nearest Dhimal equivalents.

== Vocabulary ==
The following Dhimal (Western dialect) basic vocabulary word list is from Regmi, et al. (2014: 92-98).

- dziu 'body'
- puriŋ 'head'
- pusuŋ 'hair'
- rʰai 'face'
- misjã 'eye'
- nʰatoŋ 'ear'
- nʰapu 'nose'
- nui 'mouth'
- tasiŋ 'teeth'
- detoŋ 'tongue'
- dudu 'breast'
- hamu 'belly'
- kʰur 'arm/hand'
- giru 'elbow'
- kʰur 'palm'
- aŋguli 'finger'
- kʰursiŋ 'fingernail'
- kʰokoi 'leg'
- dʰale 'skin'
- hara 'bone'
- tumsiŋ 'heart'
- hiti 'blood'
- soʔ 'urine'
- lisi 'feces'
- dera 'village'
- sa 'house'
- tsale 'roof'
- pʰinu 'door'
- misiŋ 'firewood'
- pʰesar 'broom'
- siləuṭo 'mortar'
- lohoro 'pestle'
- hətəura 'hammer'
- tsəkku 'knife'
- dupʰe 'axe'
- diham 'rope'
- sute 'thread'
- bindu 'needle'
- lokʰon 'cloth'
- aũTʰi 'ring'
- sane 'sun'
- tali 'moon'
- akas 'sky'
- pʰuru 'star'
- barsa 'rain'
- tsi 'water'
- dzʰora 'river'
- badle 'cloud'
- tsilkatsilka 'lightning'
- dʰeŋgur 'rainbow'
- bʰerma 'wind'
- antʰui 'stone'
- dama 'path'
- balʰe 'sand'
- me 'fire'
- dʰwã 'smoke'
- buʔsuri 'ash'
- bʰonoi 'mud'
- dʰula 'dust'
- sona 'gold'
- siŋ 'tree'
- lʰaba 'leaf'
- dzari 'root'
- tsui 'thorn'
- lʰe 'flower'
- pʰəlpʰul 'fruit'
- torse 'mango'
- jumpʰi 'banana'
- gom 'wheat(husked)'
- dzəu 'barley'
- uŋkʰu 'rice (husked)'
- bilaiti 'potato'
- beŋgana 'eggplant'
- bədəm 'groundnut'
- martsi 'chili'
- juŋgʰai 'turmeric'
- mantsʰar 'garlic'
- taŋgo 'onion'
- kobʰi 'cauliflower'
- golbʰanda 'tomato'
- bəndakobʰi 'cabbage'
- tsuiti 'oil'
- dese 'salt'
- biha 'meat'
- sau 'fat (of meat)'
- haja 'fish'
- kitsan 'chicken'
- tui 'egg'
- gai 'cow'
- dija 'buffalo'
- dudʰe 'milk'
- ḍaŋ 'horns'
- meṭʰoŋ 'tail'
- meʔsa 'goat'
- kʰija 'dog'
- puhjã 'snake'
- nʰojã 'monkey'
- dzahã 'mosquito'
- nʰamui 'ant'
- makra 'spider'
- mi 'name'
- djaŋ 'man'
- bebal 'woman'
- dzamal 'child'
- aba 'father'
- amai 'mother'
- dada 'older brother'
- one 'younger brother'
- bai 'older sister'
- one 'younger sister'
- tsan 'son'
- tsamdi 'daughter'
- ke 'husband'
- be 'wife'
- wadzan 'boy'
- bedzan 'girl'
- din 'day'
- belahoi 'night'
- rʰima 'morning'
- nitima 'noon'
- dilima 'evening'
- andzi 'yesterday'
- nani 'today'
- dzumni 'tomorrow'
- atʰar 'week'
- maina 'month'
- basar 'year'
- purna 'old'
- nawa 'new'
- remka 'good'
- maremka 'bad'
- tsuŋka 'wet'
- seŋka 'dry'
- rʰiŋka 'long'
- poṭoka 'short'
- dʰaŋka 'hot'
- tirka 'cold'
- dahine 'right'
- debre 'left'
- bʰerpa 'near'
- dure 'far'
- barka 'big'
- atuŋka 'small'
- lʰika 'heavy'
- homka 'light'
- ruta 'above'
- leta 'below'
- dze:ka 'white'
- da:ka 'black'
- i:ka 'red'
- eʔ 'one'
- nʰe 'two'
- sum 'three'
- dja 'four'
- na 'five'
- tu 'six'
- nʰi 'seven'
- yeʔ 'eight'
- kwa 'nine'
- te 'ten'
- egʰarə 'eleven'
- barʰə 'twelve'
- eʔkuri 'twenty'
- eʔ sae 'one hundred'
- hasu 'who'
- hai 'what'
- hiso 'where'
- helau 'when'
- hetʰe 'how many'
- hidoi 'which'
- idoi 'this'
- odoi 'that'
- ebalai 'these'
- obalai 'those'
- waŋ/odoŋ 'same'
- bʰenaŋ 'different'
- gottaŋ 'whole'
- bʰoika 'broken'
- atuisa 'few'
- hiŋtsʰa 'many'
- dzʰaraŋ 'all'
- tsali 'to eat'
- ciʔli 'to bite'
- mʰituli 'to be hungry'
- amli 'to drink'
- tsi amli kiʔli 'to be thirsty'
- dzimli 'to sleep'
- ulṭili 'to lie'
- jomli 'to sit'
- pili 'to give'
- oʔpali 'to burn'
- sili 'to die'
- seʔli 'to kill'
- uraili 'to fly'
- teli 'to walk'
- dʰaʔli 'to run/run'
- haneli 'to go/go'
- loli 'to come'
- nuidʰuili 'to speak/speak'
- hiŋli 'to hear/hear/listen'
- kʰaŋli 'to look/look'
- ka 'I'
- na 'you (informal)'
- na 'you (formal)'
- wa 'he'
- wa 'she'
- kelai 'we (inclusive)'
- kelai 'we (exclusive)'
- nelai 'you (plural)'
- obalai 'they'

== See also ==
- Dham script
- Dhimalish comparative vocabulary list (Wiktionary)
