= Sunuwar alphabet =

Writing system

Sunuwar 𑯆𑯑𑯃̐𑯌 𑯎̭𑯂𑯒𑯂 Jenticha script • Kõits script
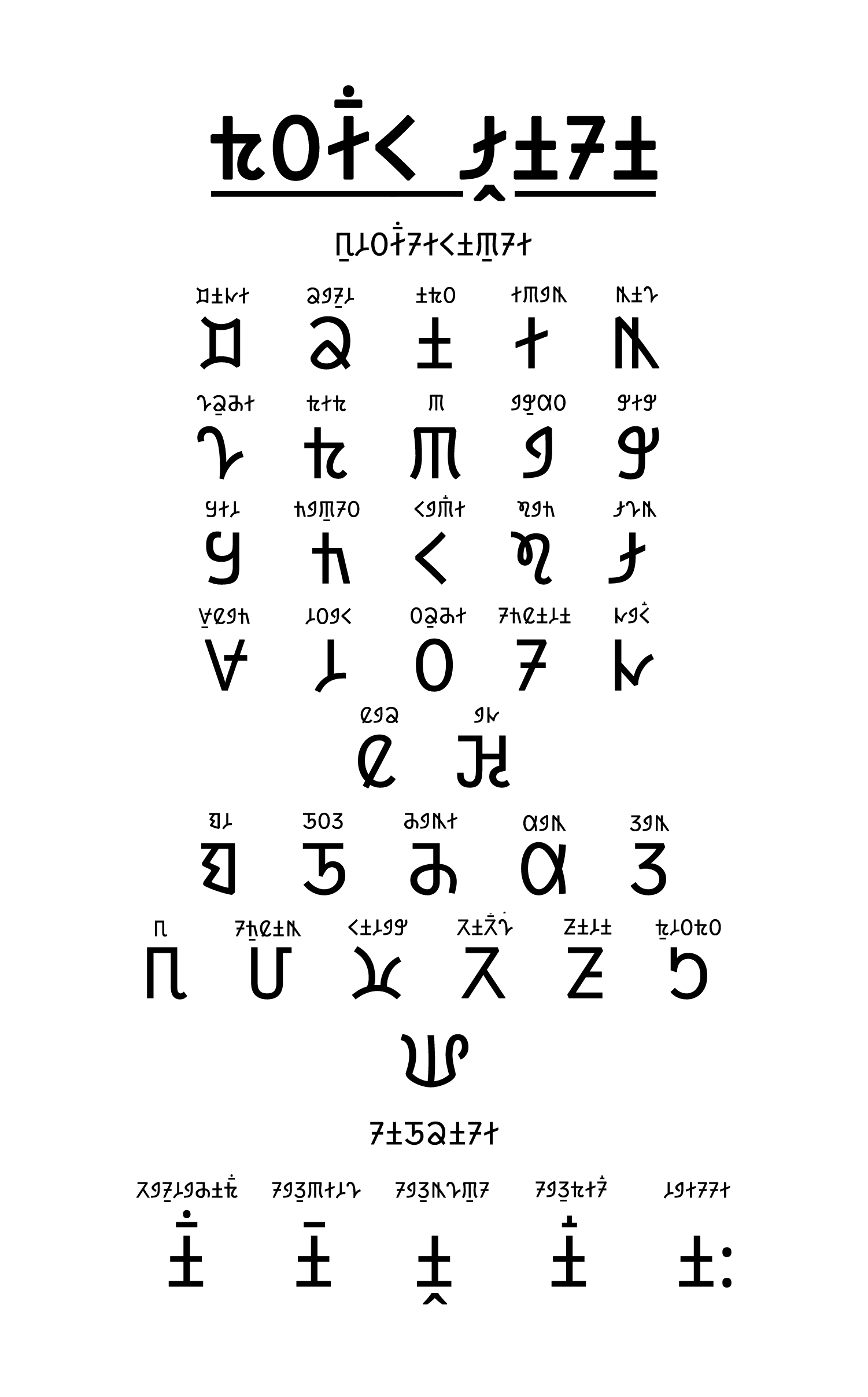
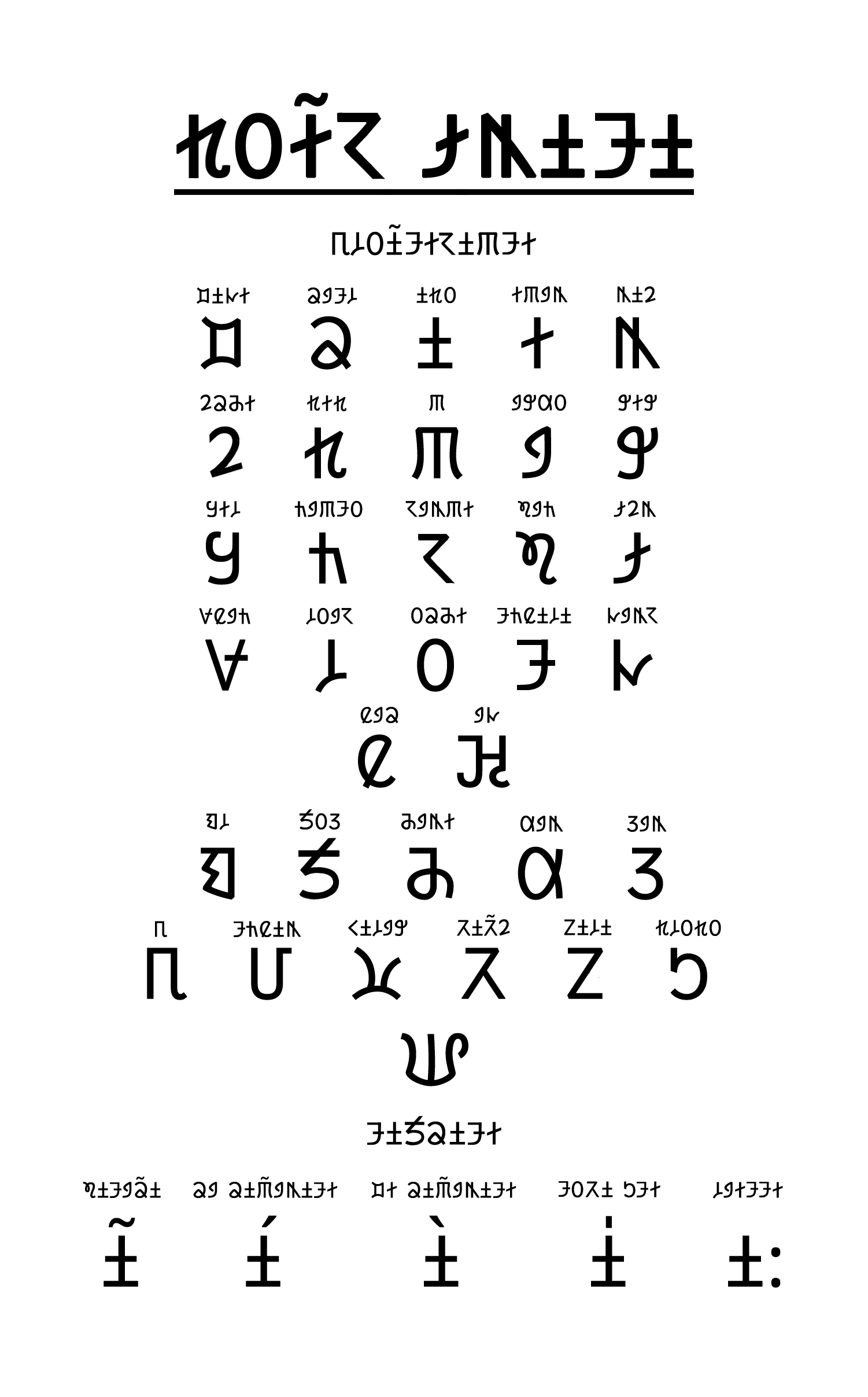
- Script type: Alphabet (with features of an Abugida)
- Creator: Krishna Bahadur Jenticha
- Created: 1942
- Period: 1942 to present
- Direction: Left to right
- Official script: Yes
- Region: Nepal, Sikkim
- Language: Sunuwar language

Related scripts
- Parent systems: Original invention: Sunuwar

ISO 15924
- ISO 15924: Sunu (274), Sunuwar

Unicode
- Unicode alias: Sunuwar
- Unicode range: U+11BC0–U+11BFF

The Sunuwar alphabet (previously the Jenticha script, occasionally Kõits script) is an alphabet developed by Krishna Bahadur Jentich in 1942, to write the Sunwar language, a member of the Kiranti language family spoken in Eastern Nepal, as in Sikkim. It is recognised in Sikkim and used as an official writing system. The alphabet has 33 letters, 10 numerals and 1 'auspicious sign'.

It is a grammatological isolate, though some symbols resemble those of the Limbu and Latin scripts. The script is written left to right. The writing system currently has no official standard.

When first created, the script was a pure alphabet, and has come to include a default non written /a/, a feature of an abugida.

== History ==
When Jentich first created the alphabet, it was limited to 22 letters, in addition to the 10 digits. Vowel length was not written, letters could also represent their retroflex consonant equivalent, and aspirated consonants were written as digraphs, using the letter hamso. The letter na was used to represent both nasal consonants and vowel nasalisation, also through the use of digraphs. The velar nasal [ŋ] was shown with a digraph of the consonants na and gil, as in English /ng/. Tones were also not shown in the orthography, despite Sunwar being a tonal language. The letter secha was used to show both the voiceless postalveolar fricative [ʃ] and the voiceless alveolar sibilant [s].

During the tail end of the 20th century, users of the language added a further 11 letters into the script:

- aal - borrowed from Limbu to write /a/ with long vowel length
- kloko - to write the Glottal stop /ʔ/
- ṭentu, ṭhele, ḍonga - to improve clarity by having separate symbols for retroflexive consonants
- kha, chhelap, phar, thari - to improve clarity by having separate symbols for aspirated consonants
- sheyer - a letter for /ʃ/, to replace the digraph (sh)
- ngar - a letter for /ŋ/ to replace the digraph (ng)
- laissi - a character to denote Vowel length

Due to the lack of a set standard, the orthography can be vague, with digraphs still being used occasionally, and consonants still being used to denote retroflexives.

Soon after the creation of the script, conferences were held in villages in Dolakha District, to promote it, and help shape its future.

== Letters ==
Image	Letter	Name	Transcription	IPA	Devanagari	Non-original?
	𑯈	appho	a	[ə]	अ	
	𑯖	aal	aa	[a]	आ	Yes
	𑯃	imar	i	[i]	इ	
,	𑯅	utthi	u	[u]	उ	
	𑯂	eko	e	[e]	ए	
	𑯑	otthi	o	[o]	ओ	
,	𑯆	kik	k	[k]	क	
	𑯛	kha	kh	[kʰ]	ख	Yes
	𑯊	gil	g	[ɡ]	ग	
	𑯚	ngar	ng	[ŋ]	ङ	Yes
,	𑯌	carmi	c	[tʃ]	च	
	𑯝	chelap	ch	[tʃʰ]	छ	Yes
	𑯏	jyah	j	[dʒ]	ज	
	𑯞	tentu	tt	[ʈ]	ट	Yes
,	𑯟	thele	tth	[ʈʰ]	ठ	Yes
,	𑯗	donga	dd	[ɖ]	ड	
	𑯁	tasla	t	[t], [ʈ]	त, ट	
	𑯘	thari	th	[tʰ]	थ	Yes
	𑯀	devi	d	[d], [ɖ]	द, ड	
	𑯍	nah	n	[n]	न, ण	
	𑯉	pip	p	[p]	प	
	𑯙	phar	ph	[pʰ]	फ	Yes
	𑯎	bur	b	[b]	ब	
	𑯕	ava	bb	[ɓ]	ब	
	𑯇	ma	m	[m]	म	
	𑯔	yat	y	[j]	य	
	𑯄	reu	r	[r], [ɽ]	र, ड़	
	𑯐	loacha	l	[l], [ɭ]	ल	
	𑯓	varca	v	[v]	व	
,	𑯒	shyele	s	[s], [ʃ]	स	
	𑯜	shyer	sh	[ʃ]	श, ष	Yes
	𑯋	hamso	h	[h]	ह	
	𑯠	kloko	'	[ʔ]	अ्	Yes

The Character Pwopwo.

The laissi symbol /:/ (or /ː/ when using the IPA symbol instead of the generic colon punctuation) is used to extend vowel length. It is a non-original character. A colon may also be used as punctuation; if it occurs after a word ending with a vowel letter it will typically be preceded by a space in order to remove ambiguity.

The symbol pvo is used to mark the Voiceless bilabial implosive /ɓ̥/. It is referred to as an 'auspicious symbol'. In spoken Sunuwar, the consonant is often said twice, and is often found in salutations and well wishes.

== Numbers ==
Sunuwar uses a set of ten numerals, in base 10, derived from Arabic numerals. They were also created by Jentrich.

Sunuwar numerals
Name	ka	niashi	san	le	nga	raku	chani	sasi	yan	sum
Image										
Character	𑯱	𑯲	𑯳	𑯴	𑯵	𑯶	𑯷	𑯸	𑯹	𑯰
Arabic	1	2	3	4	5	6	7	8	9	0
Devanagari	१	२	३	४	५	६	७	८	९	०

== Unicode ==
The Sunuwar alphabet was added to the Unicode Standard in September, 2024 with the release of version 16.0.

The Unicode block for Sunuwar is U+11BC0–U+11BFF:

Sunuwar^{[1]}^{[2]} Official Unicode Consortium code chart (PDF)
	0	1	2	3	4	5	6	7	8	9	A	B	C	D	E	F
U+11BCx	𑯀	𑯁	𑯂	𑯃	𑯄	𑯅	𑯆	𑯇	𑯈	𑯉	𑯊	𑯋	𑯌	𑯍	𑯎	𑯏
U+11BDx	𑯐	𑯑	𑯒	𑯓	𑯔	𑯕	𑯖	𑯗	𑯘	𑯙	𑯚	𑯛	𑯜	𑯝	𑯞	𑯟
U+11BEx	𑯠	𑯡														
U+11BFx	𑯰	𑯱	𑯲	𑯳	𑯴	𑯵	𑯶	𑯷	𑯸	𑯹						
Notes 1.As of Unicode version 18.0 2.Grey areas indicate non-assigned code points
