= Jhankot Sign Language =

Nepalese village sign language

- झान्कोट साङ्केतिक भाषा
- Native to: Nepal
- Region: Dolpa District
- Language family: village sign

Language codes
- ISO 639-3: jhs
- Glottolog: jhan1234

Jhankot Sign Language (Nepali: झान्कोट साङ्केतिक भाषा, romanized: Jhānkōṭa Sāṅkētika Bhāṣā) is a village sign language of the village of Jhankot in western Nepal. The Deaf make up 10% of the village, and Jhankot SL is widely known by the hearing community.

== See also ==
- Jumla Sign Language
- Ghandruk Sign Language
- Maunabudhuk–Bodhe Sign Language
- Nepalese Sign Language
