= Nepali Sign Language =

Deaf sign language of Nepal

- नेपाली साङ्केतिक भाषा
- Native to: Nepal
- Native speakers: 20,000 (2014)
- Language family: Indo-Pakistani Sign Language? language isolate?

Language codes
- ISO 639-3: nsp
- Glottolog: nepa1250

Nepali Sign Language (Nepali: नेपाली साङ्केतिक भाषा, romanized: Nēpālī Sāṅkētika Bhāṣā) is the main sign language of Nepal. It is a partially standardized language based informally on the variety used in Kathmandu, with some input from varieties from Pokhara and elsewhere. As an indigenous sign language, it is not related to oral Nepali. The Nepali Constitution of 2015 specifically mentions the right to have education in Sign Language for the deaf. Likewise, the newly passed Disability Rights Act of 2072 BS (2017 CE) defined language to include "spoken and sign languages and other forms of speechless language." in practice it is recognized by the Ministry of Education and the Ministry of Women, Children and Social Welfare, and is used (albeit in a somewhat pidginized form) in all schools for the deaf. In addition, there is legislation underway in Nepal which, in line with the UN Convention on the Rights of Persons with Disabilities (UNCRPD) which Nepal has ratified, should give Nepali Sign Language equal status with the oral languages of the country.

== History ==
Nepali Sign Language may have originated in the first school for the deaf in Nepal, established in Kathmandu in 1966 by an ENT doctor. The school was later moved to a children's home in Naxal. The aim of the school was to teach speech therapy to deaf children to have them learn to speak. Even so, deaf people who went to the school at this time recall using signs with each other during and after school. The oral policy continued until the arrival of the Patricia Ross, who tried to have total communication introduced into the school in 1985.

In 1980, 13 deaf Kathmandu youths established the Deaf Welfare Association, which would later become the Kathmandu Association of the Deaf (KAD). This was the first association of any type established by disabled themselves and run under their own leadership and management. One of the chief goals of KAD was social reform of deaf people with an effort to promote and further develop sign language. At the time sign language was still banned in the deaf school; however, KAD worked hard to keep it alive at Deaf gatherings on weekends. Later KAD developed a one-handed fingerspelling system for Devanagari with the support of UNICEF.

== Role of other sign languages in development ==
The first NSL dictionary was undertaken by American Patricia Ross in conjunction with KAD. Because of this connection, there may have been influence from ASL during the process.

Generally speaking then, NSL developed as a natural language established by the Deaf community of Kathmandu valley, but it has been influenced by other sign languages, as well as artificial systems of sign such as Total Communication or Simultaneous Communication. This influence from outside due to contact (with, for example Indo-Pakistani Sign Language and with structural principles introduced from artificial sign systems used in the United States) was strong during its initial stage of the formation, but in different ways and to different degrees remains strong to this day (although the contact is more with International Sign, American Sign Language and various European sign languages used by visiting deaf tourists and by deaf from European funding organizations). There are also semantic overlaps with spoken Nepali (and perhaps other spoken languages).

== Sociolinguistics ==
Nepali Sign Language is not used natively by the overwhelming majority of deaf people in Nepal. Since the overwhelming majority of deaf children in Nepal, as in all countries, are born into hearing families without a single signing member, Nepali Sign Language is primarily learned first at schools for the deaf. However, these schools are few in number, and not readily accessible to most, and so most deaf Nepali have no opportunity to acquire Nepali Sign Language under normal circumstances.

While the vast majority of non-hearing Nepali do not have the opportunity to acquire NSL, those who are a part of the country's active Deaf communities are often well-connected to a wide international network of signers through formal relationships with foreign Deaf organizations and personal relationships with foreign signers.

Researchers have discussed the homesign systems generated by Deaf Nepali in the absence of or in addition to NSL, which are one source of linguistic variation in the language, and the potential impact of late exposure to NSL on signing practice. Scholars have also noted that first exposure to signing practice often takes place in schools for the deaf, where classes are taught primarily by hearing teachers who use Signed Nepali, which can become another source of variation in Deaf Nepali's signing repertoire.

== Role of the Nepali Manual Alphabet ==
As mentioned above, a one-handed fingerspelling system for devanagari, the Nepali manual alphabet, was developed by KAD with the support of UNICEF. Although the idea behind this alphabet may have been motivated by foreign fingerspelling alphabets (especially American manual alphabet and the International manual alphabet), in fact only a few of the forms of the letters can be said to derive directly from those foreign alphabets (i.e. अ from “a”, ब from “b”, म from “m”, and र from “r”).

The Nepali Manual Alphabet is used not for NSL per se, but for code switching into Nepali (i.e. when a signer spells out a personal or place name, or a Nepali word). The importance of the forms of this alphabet are, however, not restricted to this function. Indeed, fingerspelling handshapes have been widely used in development of new signs, through a process perhaps borrowed from America's various systems of Signed English, whereby the initial letter of the Nepali word is incorporated into the NSL, thus creating so-called "initialized signs". Perhaps more than anything else, it is this system of initialized signs which makes the lexicon of NSL structurally different from the lexicon of Indo-Pakistani Sign Language.

== Classification ==
The classification of Nepali Sign Language is currently under dispute. Older work has suggested that Nepali Sign Language is not related to other sign languages. Wittman posits that NSL is a language isolate (a 'prototype' sign language), though one developed through Trans-cultural diffusion from an existing sign language, likely Indo-Pakistani Sign Language, or the systems that underlay it. Gallaudet University reports that NSL was "developed by the Peace Corps from local and American signs". compared sign-language varieties in India, Pakistan and Nepal and found cognate rates of 62–71%.

== Lexicon ==
Work on documenting the lexicon of Nepali Sign Language started in the mid-1980s. The first work collecting signs in Nepal that we know of was started in 1985. Patricia Ross, an American Peace Corps volunteer, was a pioneer in sign language research in Nepal. However, her work with Kathmandu Association of the Deaf (KAD) was to collect already existing signs, not creating new signs. She wrote "The initial stumbling block in initiating total communication in Nepal was the lack of any recorded sign language. Many people did not know that there was a fully developed system of Nepali signs. Despite the fact that sign was not used in the schools, the deaf people, out of their own need to communicate, had developed an intricate system of signs". Regarding the process of collecting signs, Ross further stated: "I would write down words and the students would discuss and argue about what the proper sign was. Slowly and patiently the students taught me their signs, their language." Ross's work collecting NSL signs eventually lead to the publication of the first Nepali Sign Language dictionary.

Subsequently, the National Deaf Federation Nepal published a much more extensive dictionary, and continues to work on both documenting and supplementing the Nepali Sign language lexicon.

== Phonology ==
Despite the incongruity of applying the term phonology to a sign language, like other sign languages Nepali Sign Language also has a sub-morphemic level of structuring which is analogous (to a certain degree at least) to phonology in spoken languages.

As such, the standard sign language model of phonology (first developed by William Stokoe for American Sign Language) can be applied to Nepali Sign Language as well, according to which signs are analyzable according to five parameters:

1. Handshape (or Dez in Stokoe's original terminology)
2. Orientation
3. Location (or Tab in Stokoe's original terminology)
4. Movement (or Sig in Stokoe's original terminology)
5. Expression (which in fact can be interpreted broadly to include all non-manual elements of a sign)

Although linguistic research on Nepali Sign Language is still in its infancy, and we do not have a complete list of for any of these parameters we can safely state that:

1. The set of handshapes for NSL includes not only those basic unmarked handshapes which form the core of most sign languages, but also, due to the widespread application of initialized signs, also a number of highly marked handshapes. These highly marked handshapes can, in their origin at least, be considered to be uniformly indexic (in the Peircean semiotic sense), in that they always and without exception have a meaning correlate with a Nepali word which begins with the letter indicated by the handshape in the Nepali manual alphabet. Thus, for example, the marked handshape श /sha/ occurs in words such as CITY (शहर /shahar/), EDUCATION (शिक्षा /shiksha:/), PEACE (शान्ति /sha:nti/), ENEMY (शत्रु /shatru/), TECHNIQUE/SKILL (शिल्प /shilpa/), SHIVA (शिव /shiva/, BRANCH (शाखा /sha:kha:), SHERPA (शेर्पा /sherpa:/, all of them associated with a Nepali word beginning with the letter श /sha/ (albeit in some cases now frequently spelled with स /sa/ (e.g., सहर in place of शहर for 'city')). In addition there are handshapes such as those used in the sign for POTATO (आलु) that are neither unmarked nor based on initialization.
2. The set of locations for NSL is generally restricted to the hemisphere bounded by the comfortable extension of both arms rotated at the sides of the body and also in front of the body, but may also extend beyond this.
3. Expression alone (i.e. unaccompanied by any of the other parameters nor any manual sign) can occasionally constitute a NSL sign.

One of the problems of phonemic analysis on NSL, which is also manifest in other sign languages, is the absence of extensive lists of minimal pairs such as are typically found for all spoken languages. While such pairs are impossible to find for all possible minimal pairs, a sufficient number of such pairs can be produced to justify the method. Such pairs are especially easy to find in cases of initialized signs; thus, for example, while the index finger with tip indexic the back of the opposite wrist indicates the generic term TIME (Nepali: समय /samaj/), a म /ma/ handshape indicates OPPORTUNITY (Nepali: मौका /mauka:/), a फ /pʰa/ handshape indicates FREETIME (Nepali: फुर्सत /pʰursat/), etc.

== Morphosyntax ==
Nepali Sign Language shares a number of features with most sign languages studied to date:

=== Morphology ===
Morphology in NSL, as in languages in general, comes in two types: derivational morphology and grammatical or inflectional morphology.

Incorporation is a feature which blurs the border between phonology and morphology. There exists incorporation of handshapes from the Nepali manual alphabet into lexical items as we saw above the sections above on manual alphabet and lexicon.

Incorporation also occurs in NSL verbs, in what are often referred to as "classifier predicates". The pattern is ergative-accusative, with subjects of intransitive verbs (e.g. ONE-PERSON in "One person passed by in front of me")), and objects of transitive verbs (e.g. "thick classifier" in "I ate a buff burger").

William Stokoe proposed a theoretical revision called "semantic phonology". Under such a proposal, the sign for TEA चिया /chiya:/ could be seen as a complete predicate, with the "classifier"—in this case the Nepali manual alphabet handshape च /cha/ standing for TEA चिया /chiya:/ -- being incorporated into a "verb" DRINK.

Frequently, and especially at the level of the lexicon, instruments are also incorporated.

Many verbs also agree in person (and number) with the subject and object (often the indirect object, as e.g. "He stared at me" with the sign LOOK-AT directed from third person to first person). However, there is no grammatical or semantic criteria, other than it being transitive which can determine whether a verb will manifest agreement or not. To a limited extend the phonological feature of being "body anchored" (that is, having contact with the body at some point during execution) can limit agreement (e.g. a sign which starts with a body contact will be less free to show subject agreement, and a sign which ends with body contact will be less free to show object agreement).

Thus, in sentences of the type "I gave a book to you" we may have a single sign GIVE, inflected for agreement (motion of the verb begins from the signer and moves towards the recipient) and the handshape of the verb GIVE is modified to incorporate a "thick classifier" handling classifier handshape (object the size and shape of a BOOK).

=== Syntax ===
Typically, in discourse, sentences are short, and verbal arguments (actants) are often left to context (leading to average clause length of less than 2 signs). In addition, NSL (like other sign languages), tends to be topicalizing; that is, the topic is fronted (moved to the front of the clause). Given these two facts, it is hard to a "Basic Word Order" for NSL; nevertheless, in those instances where both agent and patient are lexicalized and where there is no topicalization (e.g. in artificially elicited sentences in isolation), the word order tends to be SOV (Subject-Object-Verb) - just like Nepali and most members of the South Asian Sprachbund.

== Discourse features ==
Discourse in Nepali Sign Language shares many features with discourse in other sign language:

1. Discourse tends to be firmly "anchored" deictically, both within the space-time of the speech situation and also within the space-time of the narrative situation. As space in front of and around the signer can both represent real world space, but also the narrative world space, in addition to being used grammatically, index points and other spatial references are frequent, and may shift between the various frames.
2. Clause length in discourse tends to be rather short, so that, for example, clauses with transitive verbs will very rarely have both agent and patient expressed lexically.
3. What would in spoken discourse be called "co-speech gesture" in fact is fully integrated into the communicative semiotic of sign language discourse. The same is true of action embodiment (mimed action).
4. As the signer has at their disposal several multiple articulators (i.e. not only both hands, which may be used as independent articulators, but also their own body (in the form of embodied action)), it is possible for extremely complex discourse events to be expressed simultaneously, whereas in spoke language they would have to be expressed by a long chain of sequential lexical and grammatical morphemes.

== Other indigenous sign languages of Nepal ==
In addition to the national sign language, several local indigenous 'village' sign languages have been identified. (Note: The term "village sign language" is increasingly used as if it were a technical term describing a typologically distinct category of sign languages. Although such a class of sign languages MAY exist, it is not the intention here to imply that any of the following sign languages actually falls into such a category. Rather, they are sign languages which have arisen in a village context, and which are distinct from the national sign language, in this case Nepalese Sign Language. Further research will have to be done to determine if they share any features with those sign languages elsewhere in the world which have been called "village sign languages" (e.g. Kata Kolok in Bali, Adamorobe Sign Language in Ghana, etc.).) The following “village sign languages” have been identified: Jhankot Sign Language, Jumla Sign Language, Ghandruk Sign Language and Maunabudhuk–Bodhe Sign Language. Although insufficiently studied, they each appear to be mutually unintelligible to native signers of Nepali Sign language, and thus qualify as separate sign languages.
