= Dham script =

Script used to write the Dhimal language

Dham
- 'Dhimal Bhasha' in Dham script
- Script type: Abugida
- Languages: Dhimal language

Dham script is used to write the Dhimal language. The script has been proposed for Unicode encoding since 2012.

== See also ==
- Dhimal language
