= Jumla Sign Language =

Village sign language of Nepal

- जुम्ला साङ्केतिक भाषा
- Native to: Nepal
- Region: Jumla
- Native speakers: 8 monolinguals (2005)
- Language family: village sign

Language codes
- ISO 639-3: jus
- Glottolog: juml1239

Jumla Sign Language (Nepali: जुम्ला साङ्केतिक भाषा, romanized: Jumlā Sāṅkētika Bhāṣā) is a village sign language of the town of Jumla in western Nepal. There is a Nepalese Sign Language school in Jumla, and that the students come from a 1–2-day walk away and do not speak Jumla Sign Language.

== See also ==
- Jhankot Sign Language
- Ghandruk Sign Language
- Maunabudhuk–Bodhe Sign Language
