= Ghandruk Sign Language =

Deaf sign language of Nepal

- घान्द्रुक सांकेतिक भाषा
- Native to: Nepal
- Region: Dolpa District
- Native speakers: 20 (2011)
- Language family: village sign

Language codes
- ISO 639-3: gds
- Glottolog: ghan1245

Ghandruk Sign Language (Nepali: घान्द्रुक सांकेतिक भाषा, romanized: Ghandruk Sāṅkētika Bhāṣā) is a village sign language of the Village Development Committee of Ghandruk in central Nepal.

== See also ==
- Jumla Sign Language
- Jhankot Sign Language
- Maunabudhuk–Bodhe Sign Language
- Nepalese Sign Language
