= Maunabudhuk–Bodhe Sign Language =

Deaf sign language of Nepal

- मौनबधुक-बोधे साङ्केतिक भाषा
- Native to: Nepal
- Region: Maunabudhuk and Bodhe, Dhankuta District
- Language family: village sign

Language codes
- ISO 639-3: None (mis)
- Glottolog: maun1242

Maunabudhuk–Bodhe Sign Language (Nepali: मौनबधुक-बोधे साङ्केतिक भाषा, romanized: Maunabadhuka-Bōdhē Sāṅkētika Bhāṣā) is a village sign language of the neighboring villages of Maunabudhuk and Bodhe in far eastern Nepal.

== See also ==
- Jumla Sign Language
- Jhankot Sign Language
- Ghandruk Sign Language
