= List of sign languages =

There are an estimated three hundred sign languages in use around the world today. The number is not known with any confidence; new sign languages emerge frequently through creolization and de novo (and occasionally through language planning). In some countries, such as Sri Lanka and Tanzania, each school for the deaf may have a separate language, known only to its students and sometimes denied by the school. Some countries may share sign languages, although sometimes under different names (Croatian and Serbian, Indian and Pakistani). Deaf sign languages also arise outside educational institutions, especially in village communities with high levels of congenital deafness, but there are significant sign languages developed for the hearing as well, such as the speech-taboo languages used by some Aboriginal Australian peoples. Scholars are doing field surveys to identify the world's sign languages.

The following list is grouped into three sections :

- Deaf sign languages, which are the preferred languages of Deaf communities around the world; these include village sign languages, shared with the hearing community, and Deaf-community sign languages
- Auxiliary sign languages, which are not native languages but sign systems of varying complexity, used alongside spoken languages. Simple gestures are not included, as they do not constitute language.
- Signed modes of spoken languages, also known as manually coded languages, which are bridges between signed and spoken languages

The list of deaf sign languages is sorted regionally and alphabetically, and such groupings should not be taken to imply any genetic relationships between these languages (see List of language families).

== Sign language list ==
=== Contemporary deaf sign languages ===
==== Africa ====
There are at least 25 sign languages in Africa, according to researcher Nobutaka Kamei. Some have distributions that are completely independent of those of African spoken languages. At least 13 foreign sign languages, mainly from Europe and America, have been introduced to at least 27 African nations; some of the 23 sign languages documented by Kamei have originated with or been influenced by them.

Language	Origin	Notes
Adamorobe Sign Language	village sign	(ADS) (Ghana)
Algerian Sign Language	French	
Bamako Sign Language	local deaf community	used by adult men. Threatened by ASL.
Berbey Sign Language	family	Dogon region, Mali
Bouakako Sign Language	village	Ivory Coast
Bura Sign Language	village	in Nigeria
Burkina Sign Language	local	Ouagadougou (Langue des Signes Mossi)
Chadian Sign Language	ASL:Nigerian?	
Douentza Sign Language	local? village?	Dogon region, Mali
Eritrean Sign Language	creole	
Eswatini Sign Language	Irish, British, & local	
Ethiopian sign languages		1 million signers of an unknown number of languages
Francophone African Sign Language	ASL & spoken French	The development of ASL in Francophone West Africa
Gambian Sign Language	ASL	
Ghanaian Sign Language	ASL	(GSE)
Guinean Sign Language	ASL	
Guinea-Bissau Sign Language	local	incipient/basic
Hausa Sign Language	local	"Maganar Hannu" (HSL) – Northern Nigeria (Kano State)
Kenyan Sign Language	local?	(KSL or LAK)
Lesotho Sign Language	BANZSL	
Libyan Sign Language	Arab?	
Malagasy Sign Language	French:Danish:Norwegian	(or "Madagascan Sign Language") May be a dialect of Norwegian SL
Maroua Sign Language	local	Cameroon
Mauritian Sign Language	isolate	
Moroccan Sign Language	ASL	
Mozambican Sign Language		
Mbour Sign Language	local	M'Bour, Senegal
Namibian Sign Language	Paget-Gorman	
Nanabin Sign Language	village	a deaf family in Nanabin, Ghana
Nigerian Sign Language	ASL	
Rwandan Sign Language		
Sao Tome and Principe Sign Language	rural	
Sierra Leonean Sign Language	ASL	
Somali Sign Language	Kenyan SL	
South African Sign Language	Irish & British	(SASL)
Sudanese sign languages	village & local?	Government proposal to unify local languages
Tanzanian sign languages	local	(seven independent languages, one for each deaf school in Tanzania, with little mutual influence)
Tebul Sign Language	village	(Tebul Ure SL) Mopti, Mali (village of Tebul Ure)
Tunisian Sign Language	French:Italian	
Ugandan Sign Language	local?	(USL)
Yoruba Sign Language	local	(YSL)
Zambian Sign Language		(ZASL)
Zimbabwean sign languages		"sign language" is an official language

==== Americas ====
Language	Origin	Notes
American Sign Language	United States and Canada	ASL is also officially recognized as a language in Canada due to the passage of Bill C-81, the Accessible Canada Act. Black American Sign Language is a dialect of ASL.
Argentine Sign Language	Spain and Italy	(Lengua de Señas Argentina – LSA)
Bay Islands Sign Language	village	Honduras. Deaf-blind. French Harbour Sign Language
Bolivian Sign Language	ASL/Andean	"Lenguaje de Señas Bolivianas" (LSB)
Brazilian Sign Language	French	Libras (Lingua Brasileira de Sinais); Recognized legally as a means of communication among the Brazilian Deaf community.
Bribri Sign Language	village?	
Brunca Sign Language	village?	
Carhuahuaran Sign Language	family	Peru
Cena	village	Brazil
Chatino Sign Language	family	
Chilean Sign Language	French?	Lengua de Señas Chilena (LSCH)
Colombian Sign Language	Andean	(CSN) / Lengua de Señas Colombiana (LSC)
Costa Rican Sign Language		at least four languages in Costa Rica (Woodward 1991)
Old Costa Rican Sign Language		
Cuban Sign Language		
Dominican Sign Language	ASL	
Ecuadorian Sign Language	Andean	
Greenlandic Sign Language	Danish	"Kalaallisut Ussersuutit" (DTS)
Guatemalan Sign Language		
Guyanese Sign Language	?	
Haitian Sign Language	ASL	
Honduras Sign Language	Mexican?	"Lengua de señas hondureña" (LESHO)
Inmaculada Sign Language	Peruvian	Lima, Peru. Inmaculada is a school for the deaf. (see ref under Sivia SL)
Inuit Sign Language	village	"Inuit Uqausiqatigiit Uukturausiq Uqajuittunut (General Inuit Sign Language for deaf)" also known as Tikuraq (ᑎᑯᕋᖅ); There may be more than one. The indigenous languages is an isolate.
Jamaican Sign Language	ASL	(JSL)
Jamaican Country Sign Language	local	(JCSL)
Kajana Sign Language	village	Kajana Gebarentaal
Keresan Sign Language	village	(KPISL)
Macushi Sign Language	?	Brazil [no data]
Marajo Sign Language	home sign?	Brazil
Maritime Sign Language	British	
Maxakali Sign Language	home sign?	if not home sign, at least a young language. Brazil
Mayan Sign Language	village	
Mexican Sign Language	French	"Lengua de señas mexicana" (LSM)
Navajo Sign Language		
Nicaraguan Sign Language	local	"Idioma de señas nicaragüense" (ISN)
Old Cayman Sign Language	village	gave rise to Providence Island SL?
Panamanian Sign Language	ASL, some Salvadoran influence	"Lengua de señas panameñas"
Paraguayan Sign Language	related to Uruguayan, Old-French Sign Language	"Lengua de Señas Paraguaya" (LSPy)
Papiu Yanomama Sign Language	?	Brazil [no data]
Peruvian Sign Language	Andean	"Lengua de señas peruana"
Plains Sign Language	historically a trade pidgin distinct from national norms	national forms maintained by some Plains nations
Puerto Rican Sign Language	ASL	"Lengua de señas puertorriqueña"
Providence Island Sign Language	village	
Quebec Sign Language	French-ASL mix	"Langue des Signes Québécoise" (LSQ)
Salvadoran Sign Language	isolate	"Lengua de señas salvadoreña"
Sivia Sign Language	village	Peru
South Rupununi Sign Language	village?	Guyana
Terena Sign Language	village	Brazil
Trinidad and Tobago Sign Language	isolate?	ASL taught in schools; most deaf bilingual
Uruguayan Sign Language	Old French Sign Language	"Lengua de Señas Uruguaya"
Ka'apor Sign Language	village	(a.k.a. Urubu Sign Language, although this name is pejorative)
Venezuelan Sign Language	isolate	"Lengua de señas venezolana" (LSV)

==== Asia-Pacific ====
Language	Origin	Notes
Afghan Sign Language	indig, or IPSL creole	
Alipur Sign Language	village	
Amami Oshima Sign Language	village or idioglossia	Japan
Auslan	British	(Australian Sign Language)
Ban Khor Sign Language	village	(Plaa Pag is a dialect)
Bhutanese Sign Language	?	
Burmese sign language	ASL	may be two languages
Cambodian Sign Language	= mixed LSF, BSL, ASL, various dialects within	
Chinese Sign Language	Chinese	"中國手語" (ZGS)
Enga Sign Language	village	PNG
Esharani	isolate	Iranian Sign Language, main sign language used in Iran
Filipino Sign Language	mixed ASL, various dialects	(FSL) or Philippine Sign Language (Filipino: Wikang pasenyas ng mga Pilipino).
Fiji Sign Language	mixed indigenous–Auslan	
Ghandruk Sign Language	village	(Nepal)
Hawaiʻi Sign Language	?	Hoailona ʻŌlelo o Hawaiʻi
Hong Kong Sign Language	Shanghainese Sign Language	"香港手語" (HKSL). Derives from the southern dialect of CSL.
Huay Hai Sign Language	village	(Thailand) [no data]
Indo-Pakistani Sign Language	Indian	conflicting reports on whether Indian and Pakistani SL are one language or two.
Jakarta Sign Language	ASL:Malaysian?:Indonesian	a variety of Indonesian Sign Language
Japanese Sign Language	Japanese	"Nihon Shuwa (日本手話)" (JSL)
Jhankot Sign Language	village	(Nepal)
Jumla Sign Language	village	(Nepal)
Kailge Sign Language	village, perhaps related to SSSL	PNG
Kata Kolok	village	(a.k.a. Bali Sign Language, Benkala Sign Language)
Laotian Sign Language		(related to Vietnamese languages; may be more than one SL)
Korean Sign Language (KSDSL)	Korean	"한국수어 (or 한국수화)" / "Hanguk Soo-hwa" Korean standard sign language – manually coded spoken Korean
North Korean Sign Language	Korean, KSL	Distinct variant in North Korea
Macau Sign Language	Shanghai Sign Language	"澳門手語" (MSL). Derives from the southern dialect of CSL.
Malaysian Sign Language	ASL	"Bahasa Isyarat Malaysia" (BIM)
Maldivian Sign Language (Dhivehi Sign Language)	Local, Indian, ASL	
Maunabudhuk–Bodhe Sign Language	village	Nepal
Mehek Sign Language	home sign? incipient?	PNG
Miyakubo Sign Language	village	Japan
Mongolian Sign Language	?	"Монгол дохионы хэл"
Mount Avejaha Sign Language	village	PNG
Na Sai Sign Language	village	(Thailand) [no data]
Naga Sign Language	village?	(India) last reported in 1921
Nepali Sign Language	Indian	Indigenous sign language with inputs from Indian Sign Language, American Sign Language, International Sign, and others
New Zealand Sign Language	British	(NZSL)
Old Bangkok Sign Language	local (or village?)	
Old Chiangmai Sign Language	local (or village?)	
Papua New Guinean Sign Language	British	
Penang Sign Language	local	(Malaysia)
Rennellese Sign Language	home sign, not a full language	(Solomon Islands)
Rossel Island Sign Language village	PNG	
Samar Sign Language	village	Only prevalent in San Julian and unrelated to mainstream FSL.
Samoan Sign Language	Auslan	
Selangor Sign Language	ASL?	(Malaysia)
Sinasina Sign Language	village?	PNG, not clear if developed
Singapore Sign Language	ASL, Shanghainese Sign Language	A blend of ASL, SEE2, Shanghainese Sign Language and locally-developed signs.
Solomon Islands Sign Language		
Sri Lankan sign languages	local	(14 deaf schools with different languages)
Taiwanese Sign Language	Japanese	臺灣手語 / Taiwan Ziran Shouyu
Tibetan Sign Language	local	
Thai Sign Language	ASL	(TSL) "แบบสะกดนิ้วมือไทย" (incl. Hai Yai)
Vietnamese sign languages	local	(Hanoi Sign Language, Ho Chi Minh Sign Language, Haiphong Sign Language; some may be related to some of the Thai languages)
Wanib Sign Language	village	PNG
Yogyakarta Sign Language	ASL:Malaysian?:Indonesian	a variety of Indonesian Sign Language
Yolŋu Sign Language	local	

==== Europe ====
Language	Origin	Notes and local name
Albanian Sign Language		"Gjuha e Shenjave Shqipe"
Armenian Sign Language	isolate	
Azerbaijani Sign Language	French:Austro-Hungarian	"Azərbaycan işarət dili" (AİD)
Austrian Sign Language	French:Austro-Hungarian	"Österreichische Gebärdensprache" (ÖGS)
British Sign Language	British	(BSL)
Bulgarian Sign Language	French:Austro-Hungarian:Russian	Български жестомимичен език / Balgarski zhestomimichen ezik, BZhE
Catalan Sign Language	Catalan	(or "Catalonian Sign Language") "Llengua de Signes Catalana" (LSC)
Croatian Sign Language	French:Austro-Hungarian:Yugoslav	(Croslan) "Hrvatski Znakovni Jezik" (HZJ)
Czech Sign Language	French:Austro-Hungarian	"Český znakový jazyk" (ČZJ)
Cypriot Sign Language	ASL×GSL	"Κυπριακή Νοηματική Γλώσσα" (CSL) ("Kypriaki Noimatiki Glossa")
Danish Sign Language	French	"Dansk Tegnsprog" (DTS)
Dutch Sign Language	French	"Nederlandse Gebarentaal" (NGT)
Estonian Sign Language		"Eesti viipekeel"
Finnish Sign Language	Swedish	"Suomalainen viittomakieli" (SVK)
Finland-Swedish Sign Language	Swedish	"finlandssvenskt teckenspråk" (Swedish) or "suomenruotsalainen viittomakieli" (Finnish). A single Swedish school in Finland, now closed.
Flemish Sign Language	Belgian	"Vlaamse Gebarentaal" (VGT)
French Sign Language		"Langues des Signes Française" (LSF)
Georgian Sign Language	?	
German Sign Language	German	"Deutsche Gebärdensprache" (DGS)
Greek Sign Language	French-ASL mix	"Ελληνική Νοηματική Γλώσσα" (GSL; "Elliniki Noimatiki Glossa")
Hungarian Sign Language		"Magyar jelnyelv"
Icelandic Sign Language	French:Danish	"Íslenskt Táknmál"
Irish Sign Language	French	"Teanga Chomharthaíochta na hÉireann" (ISL/ISG and TCÉ)
Italian Sign Language	French	"Lingua dei Segni Italiana" (LIS)
Kosovar Sign Language	French:Austro-Hungarian:Yugoslav	"Gjuha e Shenjave Kosovare" (GjShK)
Latvian Sign Language	French	"Latviešu zīmju valoda"
Lithuanian Sign Language		"Lietuvių gestų kalba"
Macedonian Sign Language	French:Austro-Hungarian:Yugoslav	Македонски знаковен јазик / Makedonski znakoven jazik
Maltese Sign Language		"Lingwi tas-Sinjali Maltin" (LSM)
Northern Ireland Sign Language	British (mixed)	
Norwegian Sign Language	French:Danish	"Norsk tegnspråk" (NTS)
Polish Sign Language	Old-French, German	"Polski Język Migowy" (PJM)
Portuguese Sign Language	Swedish	"Língua Gestual Portuguesa" (LGP)
Romanian Sign Language	French	"Limbaj Mimico-Gestual Românesc" (LMG)
Russian Sign Language	French:Austro-Hungarian	"Russkiy zhestovyi yazyk" / русский жестовый язык
Slovakian Sign Language		"Slovenský posunkový jazyk"
Slovenian Sign Language	French:Austro-Hungarian:Yugoslav	"Slovenski znakovni jezik" (SZJ)
Spanish Sign Language	French	"Lengua de signos española" (LSE)
Swedish Sign Language	Swedish	"Svenskt teckenspråk" (STS)
Swiss-French Sign Language	French?	"Langage Gestuelle"
Swiss-German Sign Language	French?	"Deutschschweizer Gebärdensprache" (DSGS)
Swiss-Italian Sign Language	French?	
Turkish Sign Language	Isolate	"Türk İşaret Dili" (TİD)
Ukrainian Sign Language	French	"Українська жестова мова (УЖМ)" ("Ukrainska Zhestova Mova")
Valencian Sign Language		"Llengua de Signes en la Comunitat Valenciana" (LSCV)
Walloon Sign Language	Belgian	"Langue des Signes de Belgique Francophone" (LSFB)
Yugoslav Sign Language	French:Austro-Hungarian	

==== Near East ====
Language	Origin	Notes
Al-Sayyid Bedouin Sign Language	village	(ABSL), Negev Israel
Central Taurus Sign Language	village	Turkey
Egyptian Sign Language	Arab	
Emirati Sign Language	Arab	
Ghardaia Sign Language	village	(Algerian Jewish Sign Language) deaf & hearing, Algeria → Israel
Iraqi Sign Language	Arab	لغة الاشارة العراقية Perhaps close to Levantine.
Israeli Sign Language	Large lexical base from DGS	שפת סימנים ישראלית (שס"י SHaSI)
Jordanian Sign Language	Arab, Levantine	Lughat il-Ishaarah il-Urduniah / لغة الاشارة الأردنية (LIU)
Kafr Qasem Sign Language	Arab, village	Kafr Qasim Israel
Kurdish Sign Language	local	ZHK
Kuwaiti Sign Language	Arab	لغة الاشارة الكويتية
Lebanese Sign Language	Arab, Levantine	Lughat al-Isharat al-Lubnaniya / لغة الإشارات اللبنانية
Mardin Sign Language	family	one extended family in Turkey
Omani Sign Language	Arab?	
Palestinian Sign Language	Arab, Levantine	"لغة الاشارات الفلسطينية"
Persian Sign Language	Persian	زبان اشاره پارسى
Qahvehkhaneh Sign Language	urban	Tehran. Moribund.
Qatari Unified Sign Language	Artificial/Arab	Unclear what the Qatari deaf community actually uses. An artificial attempt to standardize all Arab sign languages has resulted in a variety used mainly by hearing Qatari interpreters.
Saudi Sign Language	isolate	"لغة الإشارة السعودية"
Seraglio Sign Language		Ottoman court
Syrian Sign Language	Arab, Levantine	
Yemeni Sign Language	Arab	"لغة الإشارة اليمنية"

=== Historical deaf sign languages ===
- Henniker Sign Language
- Martha's Vineyard Sign Language
- Old French Sign Language – ancestral to the French family
- Old Kent Sign Language – used in Kent villages in the 17th century, later incorporated into the British Sign Language.
- Sandy River Valley Sign Language

=== Auxiliary sign languages ===
- Baby Sign – using signs to assist early language development in young children.
- Contact Sign – a pidgin or contact language between a spoken language and a sign language, e.g. Pidgin Sign English (PSE).
- Curwin Hand Signs – a technique which allows musical notes to be communicated through hand signs.
- International Sign (previously known as Gestuno) – an auxiliary language used by deaf people in international settings.
- Makaton – a system of signed communication used by and with people who have speech, language or learning difficulties.
- Mofu-Gudur Sign Language – conventional gestures used by speakers of Mofu-Gudur, a Chadic language spoken in northern Cameroon.
- Monastic sign language - sign languages used in Christian monasteries in Europe.
- Signalong – international sign assisted communication techniques used to support children and adults with communication or learning difficulties

=== Manual modes of spoken languages ===
Manual modes of spoken languages include:

- General
  - Cued Speech – a hand/mouth system (HMS) to render spoken language phonemes visually intelligible.
  - Fingerspelling – alphabetic signs to represent the written form of a spoken language.
- English
  - Manually Coded English
  - Signing Exact English (SEE2)
  - Makaton
- Malay
  - Bahasa Malaysia Kod Tangan (BMKT)
- Speech-taboo languages
  - Caucasian Sign Language
  - Australian Aboriginal sign languages (though Yolŋu Sign Language does not correspond to any one language, and doubles as a language of the deaf)

== Genetic classification of sign languages ==
Languages are assigned families (implying a genetic relationships between these languages) as British, Swedish (perhaps a branch of BSL), French (with branches ASL (American), Austro-Hungarian, Danish, Italian), German, Japanese, and language isolates.

BANZSL family tree

Old British Sign Language (c. 1760–1900)
Maritime SL (c. 1860–present)	Swedish SL family? (c. 1800–present)
Papua NG SL (c. 1990–present)	Fiji Sign Language	Auslan (c. 1860–present)	New Zealand SL (c. 1870–present)	British SL (c. 1900–present)	Northern Ireland SL (c. 1920–present)	South African SL (c. 1860–present)

Danish Sign Language family tree

French Sign (c. 1760–present)	local/home sign
Danish Sign (c. 1800–present)
Faroese Sign (c. 1960–present)	Greenlandic Sign (c. 1950–present)	Icelandic Sign (c. 1910–present)	Norwegian Sign (c. 1820–present)
Malagasy Sign (c. 1950–present)

French Sign Language family tree

Old French Sign Language (influenced by l'Epée c. 1760–1789)
French Sign Language (c. 1790–present)	Belgian Sign Language (c. 1790–2000)	Dutch Sign Language (c. 1790–present)	Austro-Hungarian Sign Language (c. 1780–1920)
American Sign Language (c. 1820–present)	French Belgian Sign Language (c. 1970–present)	Flemish Sign Language (c. 1970–present)	Italian Sign Language (c. 1830–present)
Austrian Sign Language (c. 1800–present)	Slovak Sign Language	Czech Sign Language (c. 1786–present)	Hungarian Sign Language	Ukrainian Sign Language (c. 1805–present)	Russian Sign Language (c. 1806–present)	Yugoslav Sign Language (c. 1840–present)
Bhutanese Sign Language	Black American Sign Language	Bolivian Sign Language	Costa Rican Sign Language	Jamaican Sign Language	Puerto Rican Sign Language	Dominican Sign Language

Swedish Sign Language family tree

Old British Sign Language? (c. 1760–1900)
Swedish Sign Language (c. 1800–present)
Portuguese Sign Language (c. 1820–present)	Finnish Sign Language (c. 1850–present)
Cape Verdian Sign Language (c. 20th century–present)	Finland-Swedish Sign Language (c. 1850–present)	Eritrean Sign Language (c. 1950–present)
São Tomé and Príncipe Sign Language? (c. 21st century–present)

== See also ==
- Contact sign
- Intercultural competence
- Legal recognition of sign languages
- List of sign languages by number of native signers
- Manual alphabet
- Sign language
- World Federation of the Deaf
