= Disability in Uruguay =

Disability in Uruguay is often described historically and culturally by the medical model of disability. Much of current government policy surrounds the use of trained and paid caregivers for people with severe disabilities and many people who need assistive devices have not been able to access these.

In 2008, Uruguay adopted the Convention on the Rights of Persons with Disabilities. The government has worked to make more places physically accessible and to provide interpreters for Uruguayan Sign Language (LSU) which is recognized as a minority language.

== History ==
In the early history of Uruguay, people with mental disabilities were often not treated. However, one of the first patients taken into the Charity Hospital of Montevideo in 1788 was a person who was brought in due to a mental disorder. During the Uruguayan Civil War in 1843, medical care was disrupted. After the civil war, an influx of physicians from England and France helped develop more technical knowledge of psychiatry. Uruguay established its first mental institution in 1860. Reforms took place in the late 19th century, leading to the creation of "therapeutic communities" and "sheltered homes" in the early 20th century. In much of the early half of the 20th century, care for mental disabilities was only available in Montevideo.

Special education in Uruguay was created in 1910 by the Council for Primary Education (Consejo de Educación Primaria), setting up schools for students who were Deaf or who had speech disorders.

In Uruguay, the Deaf community and the community of people with disabilities are allies, but are not closely connected due to a difference in their histories. Groups representing people with disabilities began to push for their rights in the 1980s. Also in the late 1980s, Uruguay created a proposal for bilingual education for Deaf children which was intended to serve as a model for other countries. Prior to the 1980s, few Deaf individuals went on to secondary school and many in the community were pathologized. After changes in the law and encouragement of bilingual education, more in the Deaf community are accessing education and went on to university.

== Demographics ==
The rate of people with disabilities in Uruguay, according to a 2006 survey done by the National Institute of Statistics and the Honorary National Commission on Disability found that it was at 9.2 percent overall. The capital city of Montevideo had a higher rate of people with disability than the rest of the country at 11.5 percent and more of these people were living in poverty.

People with disabilities in Uruguay have a significantly lower rate of economic participation than people without disabilities.

== Policy ==
Governmental policy in Uruguay has increasingly become "rights-based" in focus. This is in contrast to the country's initial medicalized basis for instituting policy for people with disabilities. Around 2005, the government transferred the National Disability Programme from the Ministry of Health to the Ministry of Social Development.

Since around 2005, when Frente Ampilo (FA) took control of the government, special attention has been paid to the role of unpaid caregivers in Uruguay. In older welfare programs in the country, the role of unpaid caregivers was largely ignored. In recent years, starting in 2012, programs to professionalize caregivers has provided an income for these formerly unpaid laborers who provided services to children, the elderly and people with disabilities. The care system was formally launched in 2016 and provides training for caregivers.

The first time the category of "disabled" was included in the national census was in 2011.

=== Non-governmental organizations ===
The first organization led by people speaking Uruguayan Sign Language (LSU), was the Uruguayan Association of Deaf People (Asociación de Sordos del Uruguay ASUR), founded in 1928. In the 1980s, another group began to work with ASUR, the Deaf People's Research and Development Centre (Centro de Investigación y Desarrollo para la Persona Sorda CINDE), and advocated for civil rights for the Deaf community. Other organizations for the Deaf community in Uruguay exist in towns throughout the country.

Movimiento Estamos Tod@s En Acción (META) is an international group for young people with disabilities. META has membership in 10 different countries, including Uruguay.

=== Legislation ===
The Criminal Code, Article 30, provides for individuals who have committed a criminal offense to not face liability for their actions if they have a mental disability. Psychiatric care and hospitalization is regulated by Law No. 9581.

The National Disability Programme was established by Article 256 of Act No. 18,172.

In 2008, Uruguay adopted the Convention on the Rights of Persons with Disabilities, through Act No. 18,418. In 2010, Uruguay protected individuals with disabilities in Act No. 18,651 which protects their rights to access health care, education and which provides benefits and financial help as needed.

The Care Act (No. 19,353) passed in November 2015 makes caregiving an act that all children, the elderly and people with disabilities have the right to access.

Law No. 19,529 on Mental Health was passed in August 2017. The law relies on the medical model of disability.

=== Education ===
People with disabilities in Uruguay are less likely to get a higher education than people without disabilities. A study done in 2004 found that children between the ages of 4 and 15 with disabilities only attended school at 88 percent of the non-disabled population and that only 32 percent complete primary school. UNICEF reported in 2017 that 1 in 3 children with severe disabilities did not have access to education and that 1 out of 4 children with disabilities go on to complete secondary education.

As of 2017, schools in Uruguay were still not prepared to include children with disabilities into their classrooms.

The Deaf community of Uruguay are taught in Uruguayan Sign Language (LSU). The Council for Primary Education (Consejo de Educación Primaria) in 1987 created a proposal for bilingual education for LSU speakers in schools. The 2008 General Education Law refers to the use of "mother tongues" in article 40 and pushes towards a more bilingual method of instruction including sign language. A law passed in 2001 designates LSU as the "natural language" for the Deaf community in Uruguay, as does the 2008 General Education Law. In 2008, the National Administration of Public Education (ANEP), instituted mandatory bilingual education for natural speakers of LSU.

== Accessibility ==
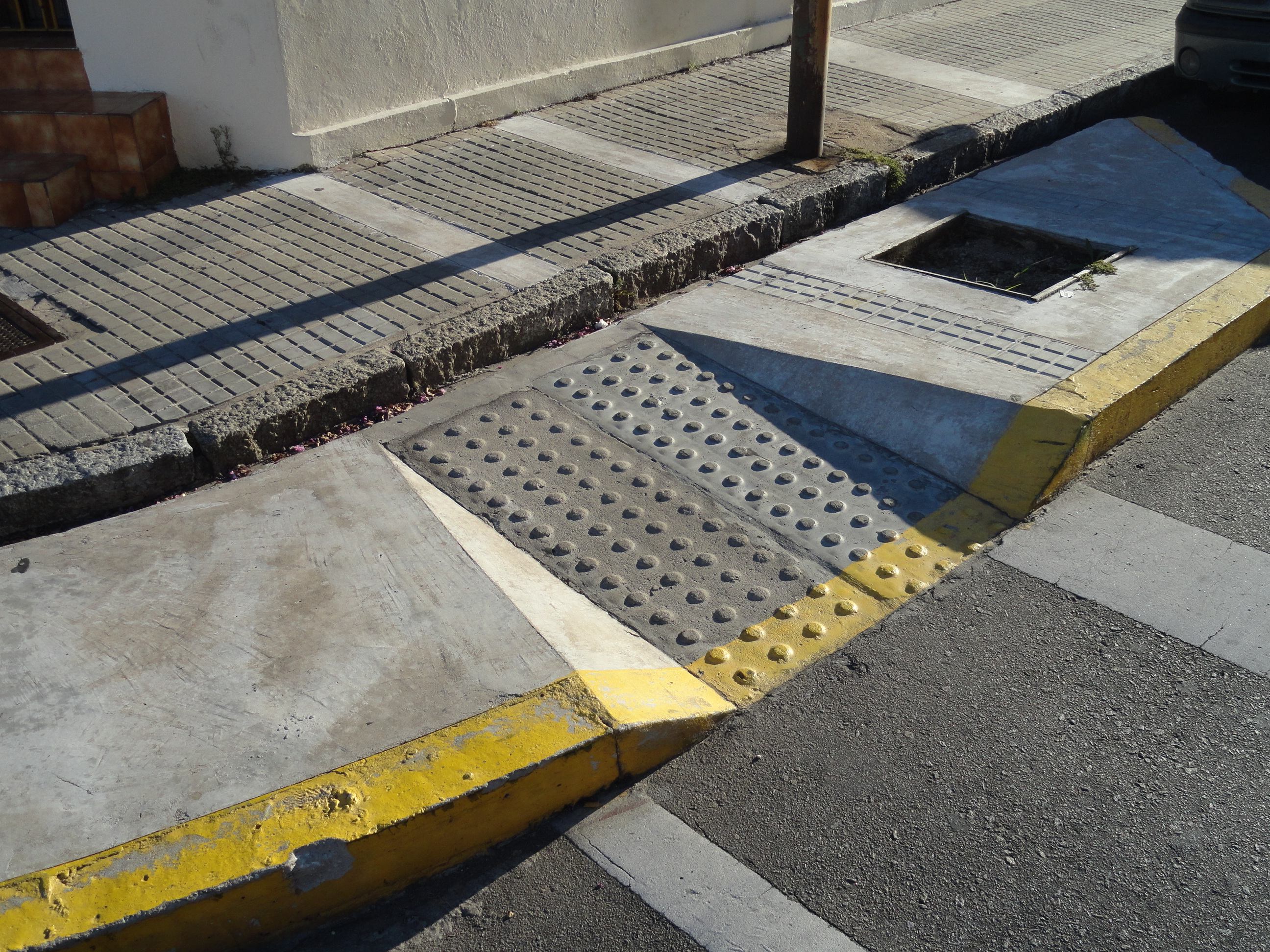
An inaccessible ramp in Maldonado, Uruguay in 2017.

In 2008, laws were passed to provide physical accessibility to all public areas and also to provide public information access. Parking spaces reserved for people with disabilities is only available in areas for shopping, hospitals and government buildings.

Less than 50 percent of individuals with disabilities who need an assistive device said that they had received one, according to a 2011 census.

A prosthetic lab in Uruguay was created in 2011, through a cooperation agreement with Cuba. In 2013, the National Centre for Technical and Technological Assistance was created to provide aid to people with disabilities.

Interpreters for the Deaf in city government exists most often in Montevideo, with less access in other cities. Some news programs also provide interpreters. Uruguay has also mandated that all television channels needed to have interpreters for other types of programs and complete the project in 2020. However, the Deaf do not have adequate access to interpreters in the health system as of 2012.

== Cultural attitudes ==
Disability activists in Uruguay reject the medical model of disability and focus instead on a human-rights approach to dealing with issues relating to people with disabilities. However, there is still an overall cultural attitude that relies on the medical model when thinking or talking about people with disabilities.

The Uruguayan Deaf community uses Uruguayan Sign Language (Lengua de Señas Uruguaya, LSU). The Deaf community in Uruguay have often been treated as speakers of a "minority language" in the country where Spanish is the national language.

== Sport ==
Since 2015, Uruguay has been hosting an Inclusive Surf Festival to raise awareness about human rights for people with disabilities. The festival, held at Brava Beach in Montevideo, has helped raise money and bring disability rights activists in Uruguay together.

== See also ==
- Uruguay at the Deaflympics
- Uruguay at the Paralympics
