= Deafness in Palestine =

The deaf population in Palestine face unique challenges and obstacles compared to the larger Palestinian population and to deaf populations in other countries. According to the Palestine Bureau of Statistics, 17,000 Palestinians in the West Bank and Gaza were deaf or hard of hearing as of 2011, although other organizations suggest that about 3% of the population is deaf or hard of hearing, with this number rising to up to 15% in some isolated villages. The Bureau of Statistics has reported that deafness accounts for 20% of all disability in Palestine. The primary signed language in Palestine is Palestinian Sign Language (LIF).

The first school for the deaf in Palestine opened in 1971, and as of 2015, 17 schools for the deaf operate across both the West Bank and Gaza, with a further 800 West Bank students being integrated into mainstream schools. Beginning in the 2010s, hearing students were able to access education in sign language and sign language interpretation.

== Demographics ==
As of 2011, about 17,000 Palestinians in the West Bank and Gaza were deaf or hard of hearing according to the Palestine Bureau of Statistics. The Effeta Paul VI Institute suggests that about 3% of the population is deaf or hard of hearing, with this number rising to up to 15% in some isolated villages. The Bureau of Statistics has reported that deafness accounts for 20% of all disability in Palestine.

Prior to the Gaza war, an estimated 15,000 deaf and hard of hearing people living in the Gaza strip, out of a population of about 1.8 million people. A survey conducted by the Atfaluna Society for Deaf Children, which is based in Gaza, found that 35,000 Palestinians had developed hearing loss or deafness during the Gaza war, from causes such as explosions damaging auditory nerves. In other cases, mineral deficiencies from malnutrition caused by blockades to the region impacted children's hearing. In 2025, UNICEF reported that about 10,000 children in Gaza had hearing loss, of which 5,000 were profoundly deaf.

=== Causes ===
In cases of deaf/HoH children born to families with no history of hearing loss or deafness, research has suggested about 56% of such cases can be attributed to genetics, while 44% can be attributed to other causes. Research has suggested that the majority of inherited hearing loss and deafness in Palestine can be attributed to consanguineous marriages.

== Culture ==
Deaf clubs were founded in Palestine beginning in 1991 in Ramallah, and five clubs existed in the country as of 2021. These clubs serve as informal gathering spaces and educational spaces.

The Palestinian Union for the Deaf is the national federation of deaf and hard of hearing people in Palestine. It is a member of the World Federation of the Deaf.

=== Access to language ===
Due to limited access to sign language education, many Gazan children with hearing parents are also not exposed to sign language. Although deaf children are taught in sign language at schools for the deaf, some families may resist using the language at home. Children with multiple deaf family members generally had more positive experiences, with sign language being used more frequently at home. Some of the deaf/HoH children in the study had strong oral communication skills and were in mainstream schools, but showed a personal preference for sign language.

== Education ==
The first school for the deaf in Palestine, Effeta, opened in 1971 in Bethlehem. The school, run by the Teaching Sisters of St Dorothy, Daughters of the Sacred Heart, accepted 24 students (aged 4-7 years) for its first year. By 1977, the schools served 83 children (of whom 21 were Christian and 62 were Muslim). Throughout the 1970s, the school used the oral-acoustic method of teaching, rather than sign language. Students were taught primarily in Arabic, with some education in English and Italian, and girls also received vocational training in knitting, crochet, and embroidery.

Palestinian Sign Language (LIF) began to be taught in schools in the 1990s, with the opening of new schools for the deaf and the publication of a LIF dictionary by the Ramallah-based Benevolent Society for the Deaf. As of 2021, all schools for the deaf in Palestine taught at least some LIF, but the official educational LIF dictionary only contains signs up through the seventh grade syllabus. Research conducted in 2020 found that, generally speaking, children in schools for the deaf faced less isolation and miscommunication compared to children in mainstream schools.

One major challenge to education for deaf/HoH youth is transportation, particularly in the West Bank. Youth in urban environments are more likely to have access to a school for the Deaf. The Palestine Red Crescent Society runs three schools for the Deaf.

The first university classes in LIF were offered by Birzeit University in 2014. Formal education in LIF interpretation was not offered in Palestine until 2019.

=== List of schools for the deaf ===
==== West Bank ====
As of 2015, there were 11 schools for the Deaf in the West Bank, serving about 700 deaf and hard of hearing students. Another 800 deaf and hard of hearing students are integrated into mainstream schools.

School	Opened	Students	Location	Notes	Funding	Ref
Islamic Charitable Society deaf school	before 1990		Ramallah			
Palestine Independence School for Deaf Children			Yatta, Hebron			
Effeta Paul VI Institute	1971	~150	Bethlehem		Teaching Sisters of St Dorothy, Daughters of the Sacred Heart; Congregation for the Oriental Churches; Pontifical Mission for Palestine	
The Big Heart School and Dormitory for the Deaf			Qalqilya		The Big Heart Foundation	
Total Communication Center for the Education and Rehabilitation of the Deaf	1993		Al-Bireh		Palestine Red Crescent Society	
Center for the Education of the Deaf			Nablus		Palestine Red Crescent Society	
School for the Deaf and Special Education			Bani Na'im, Hebron		Palestine Red Crescent Society	
Al Amal Society for Deaf Children School	1987		Hebron			
Al Hanan Primary Deaf School			Jenin			
Qaqoon Charitable Society Deaf School			Tulkarm			
Palestinian Charitable Society for the Deaf			Nablus			

==== Gaza Strip ====
As of 2015, there were six schools for the Deaf in the Gaza Strip, serving about 1,700 deaf and hard of hearing students.

School	Opened	Students	Location	Notes	Funding	Ref
Atfaluna Society for Deaf Children	1992		Gaza City		NGO	
Mustafa Sadeq Rafaee Secondary School for the Deaf	2011	350+	Gaza City	Gender-segregated	Government	

== Employment ==
Deaf and hard-of-hearing Palestinians have higher rates of unemployment compared to the general population. Some organizations have offered vocational training in hopes of improving these numbers.

Some deaf individuals have reported discrimination from potential employers, both government and private sector.

== Healthcare ==
In a 2025 study of healthcare access in the Gaza Strip, researchers found that children from lower-income families or families with a history of hearing loss/deafness were more likely to receive an early diagnosis of deafness or hearing loss. The median age of diagnosis for the studied children was 12 months.

A 2019 study of 217 deaf Palestinian adults found that depression was a common health problem in the population.

Healthcare for deaf and hard of hearing individuals in the Gaza Strip is generally more difficult to access, due to Israeli blockades on the region limiting medical supplies. Individuals seeking cochlear implants often must travel to Egypt, Israel, or further abroad, which is complicated by bureaucracy. The cost of medical procedures can also put more specialized healthcare out of reach. The Gaza war has heightened underlying issues, leading those with hearing impairments to be unable to access new hearing aids or to access aural rehabilitation or speech therapy. For others, explosions or malnutrition have caused hearing loss.

== Violence and war ==
Deaf Palestinians are at increased vulnerability to violence, especially during war or military operations, because they cannot rely on auditory sirens or the sound of bombing to respond to or assess danger. Lack of access to communication, such as sign language, hearing aids, or cochlear implants, further endangers deaf individuals, who must rely on hearing family or friends to understand what is going on during violent situations. No government institutions have provided sign language communications for Gazan residents. Bombing and other destruction also present the risk of arms or hands becoming injured or amputated, impeding sign language use. For those who use hearing aids or cochlear implants, access to batteries or electronic parts is severely curtailed.

In situations where deaf individuals come into contact with the Israeli military, deaf individuals may not be able to understand orders, leading to violence. Deaf individuals also may have delayed reactions to gunshots. If they are physically restrained, sign language users are left unable to communicate. Some Palestinians have reported being accused of using hearing aids or cochlear implants to "eavesdrop" on IDF soldiers.

Sign language use is made more difficult at night by electrical blackouts, which are frequent in both the West Bank and Gaza.

== Notable deaf Palestinians ==
- Hashem Ghazal, educator and activist

== See also ==
- Deafness in Israel
- Vibrations from Gaza, 2023 short film on Deaf children in the Gaza Strip
