= Disability in Azerbaijan =

Around 624,000 people of Azerbaijan have varying degrees of disability. This population makes up about 6.4% of the total population of the country.

== History ==
The country ratified the Convention on the Rights of Persons with Disabilities (CRPD) in January 2009. In January 2011, it submitted state party report on measures taken to give effect to its obligation under CRPD and on the progress made with regard to that to the Committee on the Rights of Persons with Disabilities.

== Classifications ==
The majority of disabled people in the country have physical impairment, sensory impairment, or mental impairment.

== Laws ==
The Disability Prevention and Disabled Persons (Rehabilitation and Social Protection) Act 1992 law prohibits the discrimination against any disabled child. The Law on Children's Rights protects disabled children in a range of areas.

== Institutions ==
There are 14 rehabilitation centers for people with disability in the country which take care about 10,000 disabled people annually.

== Public facilities ==
In 2019, Baku Metro initiated a program to allocate two staffs to chaperone disabled commuters through their destination.

== Sport ==
Azerbaijan made its Paralympic Games debut at the 1996 Summer Paralympics in Atlanta, with a two-man delegation to compete in track and field and powerlifting. It has taken part in every subsequent edition of the Summer Paralympics, but has never participated in the Winter Paralympics.

== See also ==
- Azerbaijani Sign Language
