= Saudi Sign Language =

Deaf sign language of Saudi Arabia

- لغة الإشارة السعودية
- Native to: Saudi Arabia
- Native speakers: 100,000 (2008)
- Language family: language isolate? Arab Sign Language family?

Language codes
- ISO 639-3: sdl
- Glottolog: saud1238

Saudi Sign Language (SSL; Arabic: لغةالإشارة السعودية, romanized: Lughat al-Ishārah al-Saʻūdīyah) or Saudi Arabian Sign Language (SASL; Arabic: لغة الإشارة السعودية العربية, romanized: Lughat al-Ishārah al-Saʻūdīyah al-ʻArabīyah) is a sign language used by deaf and hard of hearing individuals in Saudi Arabia. SASL has its own unique grammar, syntax, and vocabulary, which include complex linguistic features such as verb agreement, nominal case marking, and aspectual markers. SSL also uses elements such as facial expressions, gestures, and finger spelling to convey meaning and emphasis. SASL has its own literature, including humor and poetry. It can be studied as a foreign language in colleges and schools.

SASL is distinct from other sign languages used in Arabic countries, as it has its own unique vocabulary and grammar rules. In Saudi Arabia, older generations of Saudi Deaf individuals are more likely to use SASL naturally in various settings, while younger generations may be more influenced by technology and social media. This difference in language usage can have an impact on the development and evolution of the language. Nonetheless, SASL remains an important tool for communication and expression within the Saudi Deaf community.

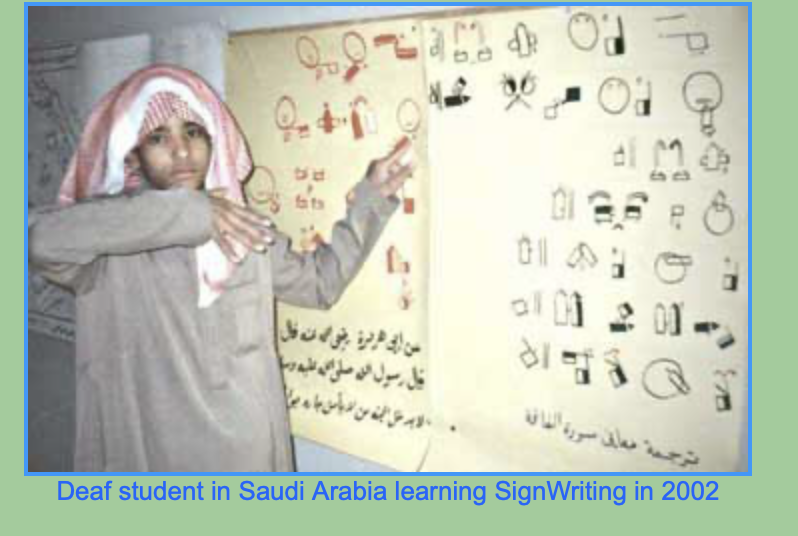
Deaf student in Saudi Arabia learning SignWriting in 2002

== History and development ==
The history of Saudi sign language in Saudi Arabia has not yet been adequately documented and researched.

Users of Saudi Sign Language still face multiple challenges, such as recognition, access to education and employment opportunities, and social inclusion. Significant barriers must be addressed to integrate Saudi Sign Language fully into all aspects of society and ensure equal opportunities for deaf and hard-of-hearing individuals in Saudi Arabia. have identified these barriers as being substantial.

Although elderly deaf individuals try to pass on the history and culture of SSL, there is a lack of necessary documentation to support their personal experience and knowledge.

The first two schools for the deaf in Saudi Arabia were established in 1964 in Riyadh, the capital city of Saudi Arabia. One institution was for boys, and the other was for girls, reflecting the gender-segregated nature of the Saudi educational system.

=== Development ===
The emergence of Saudi Sign Language has led to the creation of a vibrant deaf community in Saudi Arabia. What began as a communication tool among deaf people has evolved into a rich cultural and linguistic identity. Deaf individuals in Saudi Arabia are establishing deaf clubs, organizing cultural events, and advocating for their rights and inclusion in society.

The Ministry of Health has implemented initiatives to support the deaf community. While there are challenges posed by emerging SSL interpreting services and poorly developed SSL skills among teachers, the government and King Saud University have recognized the unique linguistic and communication challenges faced by the deaf community and made efforts to improve accessibility. This includes developing the largest Saudi Sign Language database, Standardizing the interpretation profession, unifying Saudi Sign Language, and establishing qualifications and certifications for Saudi Sign Language interpreters have also been some of the efforts to improve communication and education for the deaf community in Saudi Arabia. Such efforts have led to improved accessibility and opportunities for the deaf community. The King Salman Center for Disability Research and the Saudi Association for Hearing Impairment have supported the spread and development of Saudi Sign Language through training, resources, and research.

SSL has its own unique grammar, syntax, and lexicon. SSL has developed over time through interactions between deaf individuals in Saudi Arabia. As students communicated, they noticed each other's signs and diversified their own languages, eventually using these new signs as part of SASL.

SSL has been influenced by other sign languages, such as British Sign Language (BSL) and American Sign Language (ASL), when teachers came to Saudi Arabia or when Saudi specialists studied in England or the United States. Teachers from other Arab countries, such as Jordan and Egypt, affected the nature of SASL by adding some signs related to their culture. Some Arab teachers used Arabic signs to teach children in elementary schools, which created a few vocabulary differences between signs used by boys and girls that still exist today as they attend gender-segregated schools.

=== Documentation ===
Efforts have been made to unify SSL into a standardized sign language to be used by deaf individuals throughout the League of Arab Nations (approximately 22 countries). This sign language is composed of signs from several Arab sign languages, including Saudi, Egyptian, and Jordanian sign languages, and has been compiled into a dictionary by the Council of Arab Ministers of Social Affairs (CAMSA). However, deaf individuals have largely rejected or resisted this effort to create one unified sign language because they cannot make sense of the compiled signs.

Saudi deaf individuals, sign language interpreters, and educators have made documented efforts to unify SSL. In 1993, the principal of the Secondary Institute for the Deaf in Riyadh and adjunct professor at King Saud University, Alturki Abdullah, created a SSL handbook with assistance from his high school Deaf students. This handbook was the first document of SSL and was used as part of the only course at the time in the KSA, which taught sign language in the degree plan of teachers for deaf individuals. The Princess Alanood Foundation collaborated with Alomary in 2013 to publish the Saudi Arabia Sign Language Dictionary. The dictionary contains the alphabet, pronouns, verbs, nouns, and adjectives. Alomary worked with 60 Deaf individuals to compiled the dictionary, which is available for free online. In 2018, The Saudi Association for Hearing Disability prepared and published the Saudi Dictionary which includes thousands of signs from 28 fields, including medical, social, and religious.

== Importance ==
In Saudi Arabia, there are around 100,000 people with hearing disabilities, out of which 229,541 individuals have hearing impairments and often face neglect in public places due to the lack of interpreters. Recent statistics by the General Authority for Statistics indicate that efforts are being made to improve accessibility and opportunities for deaf individuals in the country. Saudi Sign Language is now recognized as a cultural and linguistic heritage, and various initiatives such as sign language dictionaries, interpreter training programs, and inclusive policies in education and employment have been implemented.

== Education in SSL ==
Post-secondary education is now accessible to deaf people with 396 self-contained classrooms and institutions. The College of Home Economics for Women and the College of Communication and Technical Information were the first to offer higher education programs for Deaf male and female students. The King Abdullah Scholarship Program provided deaf students with the opportunity to study abroad in 2005. In 2006, the Arab Open University (AOU) began admitting deaf individuals. Finally, King Saud University began accepting deaf and hard-of-hearing students in 2012. In 2017, King Saud University celebrated the graduation of 32 deaf or hard of hearing students (11 men and 21 women) who had completed the bachelor's degree program in Deaf education. These educational advancements have resulted in better access to education, healthcare, and employment opportunities for deaf individuals in Saudi Arabia. However, challenges still need to be addressed due to limited interaction with the hearing/speaking community. To address this, efforts are being made to promote greater interaction and understanding between the deaf and hearing communities in Saudi Arabia, including providing sign language interpreters and visual aids for communication in public spaces.

== Classification ==
SSL is distinct from the Unified Arabic Sign Language that is used by 18 Arab countries. A 1991 paper suggested that SSL may be a language isolate developed through stimulus diffusion from an existing sign language. This indicates that Saudi Sign Language has its own distinct characteristics and is not simply a derivative of spoken Arabic or other sign languages in the region.^{[3]} There is a difference between Saudi Arabian Sign Language (SASL) and other Arab sign languages. Each Arab country has its own sign language, such as Jordanian and Egyptian Sign Language.

SSL is used by approximately 750,000 deaf people. SSL is a stand-alone language, not a translation of the Arabic language spoken in Saudi Arabia.^{[3]}

== Grammar ==
The grammar of Saudi Sign Language includes non-manual markers and spatial agreement, which are crucial in conveying meaning and expressing complex ideas.

=== Morphology ===
Saudi Sign Language's morphology refers to how signs are structured and formed. This includes using handshapes, movement, and facial expressions to convey meaning. In addition, the morphology of SSL utilizes iconicity, where signs resemble objects or actions they represent.

==== Morphemes ====
SSL has various aspectual markers similar to the ones found in ASL and other European sign languages. These markers are distinct from the verbs and indicate temporal aspects. Two phonological variants of the continuous/durational aspect marker and a single form for the habitual/regular aspect marker have been identified.

Continuous/durational aspect marker:

Habitual/regular aspect marker:

Several adverbial signs are used in various constructions to give a sense of regular or habitual aspect. These adverbs include every day, weekly (or every week), and all-day/all-night. All of these markers are categorized as manual morphemes.

Two non-manual adverbials exist in SSL: the intense-face adverbial and the intense-face-wide non-manual adverb of degree. The intense-face adverbial is produced with a specific facial expression that involves raising the eyebrows, widening the eyes, and tensing the mouth. It can modify a manual adjective, a manual verb, and a classifier predicate.

Examples

•PRO. I COUSIN RECENTLY BORN BABY. YOUNG PRO. X BABY YOUNG.

“My cousin just had a baby; the baby is young.”

• POSS. I SISTER INDEX-LF STILL SCHOOL STILL. YOUNG PRO. X.

“My sister is still in school; she is young.”

•POSS. I FATHER INDEX-RT, RECENTLY RETIRE. PRO. X OLD.

“My father recently retired; he’s getting old.”

•POSS. I GRANDMOTHER INDEX-RT, OLD NINETY-SIX (SEVEN).

VERY-OLD PRO. X.

“My grandmother is ninety-six years old; she is very old."

Intense-face-wide adverbial is exclusive to SSL at this point. Both adverbials have been found to have the same form and function as in American Sign Language (ASL) and Polish Sign Language (PJM).

Three different tongue movements exist in SSL: forward tongue protrusion, side tongue protrusion, and tongue flap. Forward tongue protrusion serves as an intensifier that modifies the meaning of a sign, and also as an instance of Arabic mouthing. The side tongue protrusion is a distinguishing characteristic of SSL. Based on the available data, it appears that side tongue protrusion serves as an intensifier. All recorded instances of side tongue protrusion have been linked to negative emotions, intensity, or taboo topics.

In SSL, the tongue flap is also used as an intensifier to indicate the small size of an object or individual. However, more research is needed to determine other forms and functions of tongue movements in SSSL.

===== Argument structure =====
Research on Saudi Sign Language's argument structure has identified three main types of arguments: subject, verb, and object. These arguments convey thematic roles and linguistic features, such as person, number, and gender. The subject can be overt or inverted within the discourse and can even stand alone as a single sign. Verbs are present and can identify both the object and the subject through the direction and orientation of movement, along with spatial verbs. In contrast, objects can be oblique in terms of location and time. Example

PRO-I FLY-TO EGYPT

S V O

“I flew to Egypt.”

PRO-I SEARCH-FOR SIX-MONTH

S V O

“I searched for six months.”

SSL sentences contain subject-predicate structures, and SSL has indicating verbs that can serve as predicates.

== Syntax ==
=== Word order ===
Word order in SSL reflects the main syntactic roles of subjects, verbs, and objects. SSL appears to have a flexible word order, as personal narratives have shown that basic word order sentences can start with one sign. For example :

TRY

V

“(I) try.” Fata 0224 33:45

GRADUATE

V

“(I) graduated.” Abar 0224 13:21

Predicate standing as a complete sentence:

SOPHOMORE

Pred. (N)

“(I) was a sophomore.” Abar 0224 12:52

EMBARRASSED

Pred. (Adj)

“(She) was embarrassed.” Hafi 0310 3:02^{[11]}

Verbs modify the path of movement to indicate subjects and objects. Example:

PRO-3-HELP-PRO-I

(S)- V- (O)

“(She) helped (me).” Abar 0217 3:09^{[11]}

Spatial verbs that indicate the source and goal of motion.Example:

GO-INTO

(S)-V-(O)

“(We) went in.” Hafi 0210 1:30 ^{[11]}

SV order :

PRO-I SENIOR

S Pred. (N)

“I was a senior.” Abar 0224 13:20

PRO-I PRO-3 COUSINS

S S Pred. (N)

“I and he are cousins.” Hafi 0210

PRO-I SURPRISE

S Pred. (Adj)

“I was surprised!” Samir 0210 6:04

PRO-I YOUNG

S Pred. (Adj) Hafi 0210 1:02^{[11]}

“I was young.”

OV order :

APARTMENT NOT-WANT

O V

“The apartment, (I) didn’t want it.” Fata 0331b 0:31^{[11]}

Indirect object overtly produced :

I-20 FORM _{rt}-SEND-TO-_{PRO-1} PRO-I

O (S)-V-(O) O

“The I-20 form, (they) sent it to me!” Samir 0310 5:44^{[11]}

SVO order:

PRO-I GO-TO HOTEL

S V O

“I went to the hotel.” Abar 0217 3:27

PRO-I DEVELOP ENGLISH

S V O

“I will improve my English.” Fata 0224 33:41^{[11]}

SOV order :

PRO-I UNIVERSITY GRADUATE

S O V

“I graduated from the university.” Hafi 0310 2:36^{[11]}

OSV order :

CAMERA PRO-I DV_{-‘open camera’}

O S V

“The camera, I opened it.” Samir 210 8:19^{[11]}

Embedded clauses

PRO-I NOT-KNOW [MOTHER VAGUE]

S V [S Pred. (Adj.)]

“I didn’t know that Mother was hedging.” Hafi 0310 1:53

MOTHER THINK [CAN’T]

S V [(S)-V]

“Mother thought that I couldn’t.” Samir 0310 5:35^{[11]}

Other data:

JEFF LIKE ICE-CREAM

S V O

“Jeff likes ice cream.”

LESA CL-I ANIKA CL-I WALK-TO HUG

O S V V

"Anika hugs Lesa."

The data presented indicates that SASL displays the word orders of SVO, OSV, and SOV. In SSL, declarative sentences generally follow a Subject-Verb-Object word order, which is similar to the word order used in many spoken languages. However, other word orders such as SOV and VSO are also available. When producing declarative sentences in SSL, no additional nonmanual markings are used, and the most common order is SVO. OVS word order is typically used in locative sentences, while OSV is relatively rare. SOV word order is rarely observed in SSL. Here are some examples :

(5) He GO SCHOOL

“He is going to school” [3]

(6) CHAIR ON BALL

“The ball is on the chair”[3]

Interrogative sentences in Saudi Sign Language (SSL) are indicated by nonmanual grammatical markers, such as raised eyebrows and a forward head tilt For example, raising eyebrows and tilting the head forward and the hand sign indicate yes/no questions.

(7) YOU LIKE CANDY

"Do like candy?"
