= HDS =

HDS may refer to:

== Businesses ==
- Hitachi Data Systems, an American software company
- Hachette Distribution Services, a Canadian distributor

== Technology ==
- HTTP Dynamic Streaming
- Hardware-dependent software
- Hydrodesulfurization
- Hydrodynamic separator
- Holographic data storage

== Other uses ==
- Croatian Composers' Society (Croatian: Hrvatsko društvo skladatelja)
- Croatian Democratic Party (Croatian: Hrvatska demokršćanska stranka)
- Eastgate Airport, near Hoedspruit, South Africa
- Harvard Divinity School
- Heroes del Silencio, a Spanish rock band
- Honduran Sign Language
