= Providencia–Cayman Sign Language family =

Group of Caribbean sign languages

Providencia–Cayman Sign Language
- Geographic distribution: Caribbean
- Linguistic classification: A possible sign language family
- Subdivisions: Providencia Sign; Old Cayman Sign

Language codes
- Glottolog: prov1248

The Providencia–Cayman Sign Language family is a possible language family of two related sign languages: Providencia Sign and Old Cayman Sign.
