= Egyptian Sign Language =

Sign language used in Egypt

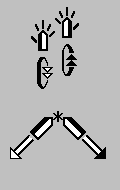
- Region: Egypt
- Signers: 500,000 (2021)
- Language family: Arab Sign Language family: Egyptian Sign Language

Language codes
- ISO 639-3: esl
- Glottolog: egyp1238

Egyptian Sign Language (Arabic: لغة الإشارة المصرية, romanized: lughat al-ʿišāra al-Miṣriyyati) is a sign language used by members of the deaf community in Egypt.

== Sign language ==
Although there are no official statistics on the number of deaf people or the number of people who use Egyptian Sign Language as their primary language, Gallaudet University's library resources website quotes a 1999 estimate of 2 million hearing impaired children, while a 2007 study by the World Health Organization places the prevalence of hearing loss in Egypt at 16.02% across all age groups. Egyptian Sign Language is not formally recognized by the government.

Linguistically, Egyptian Sign Language is not related to other sign languages of the Arab World, such as Jordanian Sign Language, Palestinian Sign Language, or Libyan Sign Language. Attempts at unification, creating an "Arabic Sign Language", have failed, as the unified form would be an entirely new language.

== See also ==
- Deafness in Egypt
