= Old Cayman Sign Language =

Deaf sign language of the Cayman Islands

- Native to: Cayman Islands
- Region: Grand Cayman
- Extinct: ?
- Language family: village sign: Providencia–Cayman Sign?; Old Cayman Sign Language

Language codes
- ISO 639-3: None (mis)
- Glottolog: oldc1248
- Various sign languages of Turtle Island (North America), excluding Francosign languages. OCSL is labelled in pink.

Old Cayman Sign Language is, or was, the deaf sign language of Grand Cayman in the Cayman Islands. It may be related to Providencia Sign Language.
