= Kurdish Sign Language =

Deaf sign language of the Kurds of Iraq

- ZHK
- Native to: Kurdistan Region
- Ethnicity: Kurds
- Native speakers: 1,000+ (2015)
- Language family: Deaf-community sign language, perhaps a language isolate
- Dialects: Sulaymaniyah; Erbil; Duhok

Language codes
- ISO 639-3: zhk
- Glottolog: kurd1260

Kurdish Sign Language (ZHK, from Kurdish Zmani Hêmay Kurdi) is the deaf sign language of the Kurds of Kurdistan Region, Iraq. There are three dialects, associated with the three Kurdish schools for the deaf in Sulaymaniyah, Erbil and Duhok. It is unintelligible with Iraqi Sign Language.

== History and influences ==
ZHK may have originated with the establishment of the first Kurdish school for the deaf in Sulaymaniyah in 1982. The first teachers at that school apparently did not know Iraqi Sign Language, so it would seem that ZHK does not descend from ISL. It is unknown whether the sign language used at the Sulaymaniyah school was based on an existing sign language of the deaf community, or if it was created when deaf children who knew only home sign were brought together. There are lexical similarities with Iraqi Sign Language, but it is unknown if they are due to influence from ISL in the 1990s or later, or if they reflect a common inheritance from Ottoman/Arab signs or gestures (though Sulaymaniyah was established after the fall of the Ottoman Empire). Translators for ZHK are unable to understand deaf Kurds educated in Baghdad, indicating that they are distinct languages. Students from the three Kurdish schools are able to communicate with each other, though they note lexical differences between them.

== Speakers ==
As of 2015, over 1,000 students have been to one of the deaf schools, suggesting that number as the minimum speaking population, out of a total of perhaps 10,000 deaf in Iraqi Kurdistan.

== Recognition ==
As of 2024, only five ZHK interpreters were working in the Kurdistan region.

In 2024, the American University of Iraq, Sulimani offered its first classes in Kurdish Sign Language.
