= Henniker Sign Language =

Extinct sign language of Henniker, New Hampshire, US

Henniker Sign
- Native to: United States
- Region: Henniker, New Hampshire
- Extinct: ca. 1900?
- Language family: village sign

Language codes
- ISO 639-3: None (mis)
- Glottolog: None

Henniker Sign Language was a village sign language of 19th-century Henniker, New Hampshire and surrounding villages in the US. It was one of the three local languages which formed the basis of American Sign Language. Although the number of students from Henniker were fewer than speakers of the more famous Martha's Vineyard Sign Language, deafness in Henniker was genetically dominant, and Henniker SL was therefore likely to have been better developed than MVSL.

== See also ==
- Sandy River Valley Sign Language
