= Guatemalan Sign Language =

Deaf sign language of Guatemala

- Lenguaje de señas guatemalteco
- Native to: Guatemala
- Native speakers: 50,000 (2021)
- Language family: Language isolate ?

Language codes
- ISO 639-3: gsm
- Glottolog: guat1249
- ELP: Guatemalan Sign Language

Guatemalan Sign Language or Lensegua (Spanish: Lengua de señas guatemalteco) is the proposed national deaf sign language of Guatemala, formerly equated by most users and most literature equates with the sign language known by the acronymic abbreviations LENSEGUA, Lensegua, and LenSeGua. Recent legal initiatives have sought to define the term more inclusively, so that it encompasses all the distinctive sign languages and sign systems native to the country.

The first dictionary for LENSEGUA was published in 2000, and privileges the eastern dialect used largely in and around Guatemala City and by non-indigenous Ladino and mestizo populations in the eastern part of the country. A second dialect is spoken in the western part of the country, especially by non-Indigenous mestizo and Ladino populations in and around the country's second largest city, Quetzaltenango, located in the western highlands. The eastern and western dialects are mutually intelligible for the most part, although they employ slightly different signed-alphabets, lexicons, and, to a lesser extent, grammatical forms. In her still-unpublished 2015 doctoral dissertation Linguistic anthropologist Monica Rodríguez noted that there exists some competition between the two dialects. The competition is based not only on loyalty to local variants, but also mutual suspicion that exogenous influences in other dialects are excessive. The presumption is that the different LENSEGUA dialects evidence formative influence from other sign languages, such as Old Costa Rican Sign Language and American Sign Language (ASL), not to mention indigenous substrate sign languages of the region.

LENSEGUA is distinct from the sign languages used in Mexico and other neighboring Spanish speaking countries. Lensegua is also distinct from the sign languages used by Indigenous populations of Guatemala and neighboring countries, such as those belonging to the family of related sign languages used by Mayas in the Yucatán Peninsula, Chiapas, and Guatemala, respectively, which have come to be known collectively by the misnomer Mayan sign languages, even though none of the sign languages actually belongs to Mayan language family. A notable difference between LENSEGUA and indigenous sign languages of the region is that LENSEGUA has a manual alphabet and makes use of initialized signs and finger-spellings.

For Deaf education, a number of schools, organizations, and service programs in Guatemala not only teach LENSEGUA, but use it their primary language for instruction. Although LENSEGUA holds no official status, municipal and departmental governments have largely allowed language promoters to teach basic lessons on and about LENSEGUA to hearing children in primary and secondary schools across the country, even in indigenous communities, where other indigenous sign languages might be used.

== Origins ==
Although no detailed study of the origins of LENSEGUA has been published, authors have generally assumed that it is an endogenous creole that emerged in the twentieth century, although they have not conclusively determined when or by what process. The endogenous origin is suggested by lack of similarity between LENSEGUA and foreign sign languages suggests that it is largely of endogenous origin, unlike the national sign language of El Salvador, Salvadoran Sign Language, which is in large part a combination of at least three versions of American Sign Language, imported into El Salvador by different groups at different times. Creole language status has been suggested by the fact that the language has significant influence from OLESCA or Old Costa Rican Sign Language, and more recently, ASL or American Sign Language.

Until recently, scholars and native-speakers signers of Lensegua as a First language were reluctant to admit that indigenous substrate languages likely had an influence on the development of LENSEGUA, but increasing recognition that the indigenous sign languages are real languages that likely pre-existed the arrival of Europeans has begun to shift that position. Although the comparison of basic vocabulary in LENSEGUA and indigenous sign languages using Lexicostatistics does not indicate high rates of similitude, non-basic signs show a higher degree of similarity than would be likely by either chance or by purely iconic motivations. Some LENSEGUA signs are identical to indigenous signs. Others are identical except that they include an initialism from LENSEGUA's manual alphabet.

== Number of Speakers ==
Estimates of the number of speakers of Lensegua and/or Guatemalan Sign Language vary widely, although there is wide agreement that the occurrence of congenital deafness, prelingual deafness, and adult-onset deafness are significantly higher than what the World Health Organization estimates for the global population, due to poverty, lack of access to medicine, distance from hospitals, not to mention potential environmental or genetic reasons. Using research published in 2008 by Elizabeth Parks and Jason Parks of SIL International, the Endangered Languages Project (ELP), estimates that 28,000-256,000 people speak Guatemalan Sign Language, but it notes that estimates have ranged as high as 640,000. The higher numbers are based on estimates of the total population of Guatemalans with significant hearing loss, without acknowledging that there are multiple sign languages in the country. Thus, popular estimates conflate statistics for all sign languages in the country, including not just Lensegua, but also the indigenous sign language or languages used by diverse Maya peoples of Guatemala, including the K'iche' Maya of the Guatemalan department of Totonicapán, Sololá, Quetzaltenango, Suchitepéquez, and El Quiché.

== Purported Official Status ==
Guatemala's national legislature has never recognized a national sign language, despite having considered, but never voted on, at least three legislative bills or Inciativas de Ley that would have done so: Bill 3932 of 2009, Bill 5128 of September 9, 2016, and Bill 5603 of August 14, 2019. Each later bill borrowed language significantly from the earlier unapproved bills. All three have proposed that a particular sign language, LENSEGUA, (1) be recognized as the national sign language of Guatemala, and (2) that it be considered simply an acronymic abbreviation for Lengua de Señas de Guatemalaor "Guatemalan Sign Language."

Bills 5128 and 5603 would (3) further recognized "Guatemalan Sign Language" as the native sign language of the entire deaf community of Guatemala, and thereby actually made the language name embrace a number of diverse sign languages used in the country, including not just LENSEGUA, but also homesign systems and Indigenous sign language of the Meemul Tziij complex used in Guatemala. Article 4 of Bill 5603 specifically stated:

Guatemalan Sign Language, hereinafter "LENSEGUA", is recognized officially as the manner of communication of deaf and deaf-blind people that is characteristic and recognized in the Republic, composed of and assortment of gestures, forms, manual mimicry and bodily movements with its corresponding grammar.

In the original Spanish, the text reads,

ARTÍCULO 4. Lengua de Señas de Guatemala, LENSEGUA. Se reconoce y aprueba oficialmente la Lengua de Señas de Guatemala "LENSEGUA", como el medio de comunicación compuesto por el conjunto de gestos, formas, mímicas manuales y movimientos corporales característicos con gramática propia de las personas sordas y sordociegas, reconocidos en la República.

The early Bill 5128 from 2016 stated similarly:

Guatemalan Sign Language, hereinafter LENSEGUA, is officially recognized as the first language and means of communication for deaf people throughout the national territory. The sign language of Guatemala and other sign languages, according to the Convention on the Rights of Persons with Disabilities, is the set of gestures, mimic forms, manual and bodily movements that are characteristic and recognized in the territory of the country.

The original Spanish text reads,

Artículo 1. Se reconoce oficialmente la Lengua de señas de Guatemala, de aquí en adelante LENSEGUA, como primera lengua y medio de comunicación de las personas sordas en todo el

territorio nacional. La lengua de señas de Guatemala y otras lenguas de señas, de acuerdo con la Convención Sobre los Derechos de las Personas con Discapacidad, es el conjunto de gestos, formas mímicas, manuales y movimientos corporales característicos y reconocidos en

el territorio del pais.
