= Atfaluna Society for Deaf Children =

Organization based in Gaza City, Palestine

- جمعية أطفالنا للصم
- Formation: 1992; 34 years ago
- Type: NGO nonprofit
- Headquarters: Gaza City, Gaza Strip, Palestinian Territories
- Website: www.atfaluna.org/en

The Atfaluna Society for Deaf Children (Arabic: جمعية أطفالنا للصم) is a non-profit based in Gaza City, which aims to empower Deaf children and adults in the Gaza Strip. It was established in 1992. ASDC is one of two schools for the deaf in the Gaza Strip.

As of 2024, they have 134 permanent staff members, 55% of whom are deaf. As of 2017, they served roughly 15,000 deaf individuals.

ASDC is affiliated with Anera, who have helped to providing funding and training for the group.

== Programs ==
The non-profit offers services related to education, sign language classes, audiology, speech therapy, job opportunities, vocational training, and community training and awareness programs. Vocational training programs have included skills such as "carpentry, sewing, embroidery and rug weaving".

The Atfaluna Crafts program allows deaf clientele and their family members to make and sell products such as ceramic cups, needlepoint works, and majdalawi fabric.

In 2012, ASDC opened a restaurant, Atfaluna, which is staffed primarily by deaf individuals.

In 2015, ASDC mounted a program to help deaf children express the trauma they underwent during the 2014 Gaza war through short films and animation.

== History ==
Atfaluna was founded in 1992 by a women's group, with support from World Vision.

At its founding in 1992, Atfaluna provided "training, full medical assessment and treatment, and rehabilitation". By 1995, the school served 91 students. By the 2007-2008 school year, 275 students attended.

In 2000, they established the Atfaluna Crafts program.

In March 2024, ASDC's main building was bombed in an Israeli airstrike as part of the Gaza war. The building was partly destroyed, and the remaining structure became a shelter for displaced people. At least two ASDC employees have died during the war, including head of carpentry Hashem Ghazal. As of June 2024, the organization has continued to offer programming to the best of its capabilities.

== See also ==
- Deafness in Palestine
