= Uruguay at the Deaflympics =

- IPC code: URU
- Medals: Gold 0 Silver 0 Bronze 0 Total 0

Summer appearances
- 2001

Uruguay competed at the Deaflympics for the first time in 2001, when they sent a delegation consisting of only one athlete in the event. The second time in the deaflympics was in 2022 games in Caxias do Sul, Brazil, with three athletes. Uruguay yet to receive a medal at the Deaflympics.

== Medal tallies ==
=== Summer Deaflympics ===
Event	Gold	Silver	Bronze	Total
2001	0	0	0	0
2022	0	0	0	0

== Medal tallies by sport ==
Sport event	Gold	Silver	Bronze	Total
Athletics	0	0	0	0
Tennis	0	0	0	0

== See also ==
- Uruguay at the Olympics
- Uruguay at the Paralympics
