= Iranian Sign Language =

Deaf sign language of Iran

- Persian Sign Language
- Native to: Iran
- Ethnicity: 3.0 million Deaf people in Iran (2019)
- Native speakers: 250,000 (2021)
- Language family: Language isolate

Language codes
- ISO 639-3: psc
- Glottolog: pers1244

Iranian Sign Language (ISL), also referred to as Farsi Sign Language, Persian Sign Language, and Zaban Eshareh Irani (ZEI, Persian: زبان اشاره ایرانی), is the sign language used by Deaf and hard-of-hearing people in Iran. It is a true sign language, unlike the Baghcheban phonetic hand alphabet, which is a form of cued speech.

== Deaf community in Iran ==
The estimate of the population of the deaf community in Iran varies between 1.5 and 3 million; Siyavoshi (2017) published that the Iranian Department of Health and Welfare reported 200,000 people self-identifying as deaf when registering for social and medical services. However, no estimate is available for the number of ISL users in the country.

== Regional variation ==
ISL is not standardized across the country. For example, the dialect used in Kermanshah province is largely comprehensible to ISL users in Tehran, but has some minor vocabulary and fingerspelling differences. Researchers have also noted the dialect uses different mouth shapes, which may have arisen from contact with Kurdish speakers.

== Recognition ==
According to the Center for Human Rights in Iran, although Iran ratified the Convention on the Rights of Persons with Disabilities (CRPD) in 2008, the Iranian government had not officially recognized sign language or introduced sign language-related legislation as of 2018.

In late 2021, Sharif University of Technology and Islamic Azad University released the first academic book on ISL.

== Names ==
In 1980, the dictionary "Culture: Farsi Sign Language For Deaf, 1st Volume" was published by the Iranian National Organization for the Welfare of the Deaf, referring to the sign language used by deaf and hard-of-hearing communities in Iran. In 1984, a university group based in Tehran published the first of four editions of "Dictionary of Farsi Sign Language: Standardized Signs", although the English cover used the title "Persian Sign Language Collection for the Deaf", and used the terms Farsi Language and Persian Sign Language interchangeably. In 1999, the phrase Iranian Sign Language was first used in a Master's thesis. However, the thesis was written by a hearing author without involvement from the deaf community in Iran.

In 2014, deaf linguist Dr. Ardavan Guity, Abbas Behmanesh, and Jodie Novak created a video describing the linguistic properties of Zaban Eshareh Irani, the transliteration of the Persian phrase meaning Iranian Sign Language. Following the video's release, the term Zaban Eshareh Irani gained traction in social media use, particularly among deaf communities in ethnic groups, such as Gilaks, Kurds, and Baloch people whose primary language is not Farsi and felt alienated from terms such as Farsi Sign Language. However ZEI was also problematic, as Persian does not have capitalization or acronyms.

In 2021, Guity and Dr. Sara Siyavoshi, a hearing linguist from Iran, proposed the term Esharani as a new name for the sign language used in Iran, derived from the Persian morpheme eshar (sign), ran (Iran), and the suffix -i, commonly used for language names in Persian. The sign for Esharani itself is derived from the combination of the signs for "Iran" and "sign", where the non-dominant hand is in the five handshape and the dominant hand moves in a spiral motion with the thumb out over the palm of the non-dominant hand. However the acceptability of the name is still under discussion among the deaf communities in Iran.

== Grammar ==
In Tehrani ISL, sentence order is generally subject-object-verb (SOV). In the dialect, clause-level negation is performed using manual gestures at the end of the clause, following the verb, excepting some cases where the verb was used to negate the sentence. Negation could also be performed with a predicate; this structure could then be used as an affix or clitic.

When forming relative clauses, raised brows are used to indicate a reference point. Non-manual markers are also crucial for politeness when forming requests, rejections, and apologies. Among these three categories, squinting is used most frequently for requests, side tilt for rejections, and lip puckering for apologies.

== See also ==
- Qahveh Khaneh Sign Language

== Scholarly literature ==
- Azar, Saeideh Ghanbari; Seyedarabi, Hadi (May 2020). "Trajectory-based recognition of dynamic Persian sign language using hidden Markov model". Computer Speech & Language. 61 101053. arXiv:1912.01944. doi:10.1016/j.csl.2019.101053. S2CID 208617698.
- Barkoky, Alaa; Charkari, Nasrollah M. (2011). "Static hand gesture recognition of Persian sign numbers using thinning method". 2011 International Conference on Multimedia Technology. pp. 6548–6551. doi:10.1109/ICMT.2011.6002201. ISBN 978-1-61284-771-9. S2CID 17997392.
- Karami, Ali; Zanj, Bahman; Sarkaleh, Azadeh Kiani (March 2011). "Persian sign language (PSL) recognition using wavelet transform and neural networks". Expert Systems with Applications. 38 (3): 2661–2667. doi:10.1016/j.eswa.2010.08.056.
- Siyavoshi, Sara (2019-11-01). "Hands and faces: The expression of modality in ZEI, Iranian Sign Language". Cognitive Linguistics. 30 (4): 655–686. doi:10.1515/cog-2018-0130. ISSN 1613-3641.
