= Emirati Sign Language =

Deaf sign language of the UAE

- لغة الإشارة الإماراتية
- Native to: UAE
- Native speakers: unknown; deaf population of 600 or more (2011)
- Language family: Perhaps an Arab sign language

Language codes
- ISO 639-3: None (mis)
- Glottolog: None

Emirati Sign Language (Arabic: لغة الإشارة الإماراتية, romanized: Lughat al-Ishārah al-Imārātīyah is a unified sign language for the deaf community in the UAE.

Emirati Sign Language has been developed by the Zayed Higher Organization for People of Determination and is the first deaf sign language for the United Arab Emirates (UAE) dialect, and a unified reference language for those with hearing disabilities in the UAE. The UAE launched its first sign language dictionary in 2018, while the first dictionary of Unified Arabic Sign Language was released in 2001. The dictionary was compiled by eight authorities with the help of 60 people with hearing difficulties and sign language specialists from across the UAE, and is used to standardize the signs used by deaf people in the UAE. It includes details about the Emirati culture and heritage, such as traditional clothes, local food, and historical places, which was previously chosen, and is divided into many sections that cover topics such as numbers, countries, family, and religion.

There are approximately 72 million deaf people worldwide, using more than 300 different sign languages, according to the World Federation of the Deaf (WFD).

== UAE's First Deaf School ==
Al Amal School for the Deaf, located in Sharjah, was founded in 1979 and is the first school in the UAE dedicated solely to the education of deaf and hard of hearing children. Since its inception, it has been the only school in the country built to fulfill the needs of the deaf community.

=== Graduates from Al Amal School for the Deaf ===
Al Amal School for the Deaf, founded in 1979, will have 93 high school graduates by 2021.The school celebrated nine additional high school graduates in 2021.

==== Learning Program ====
Since 2013, the Al Amal School for the Deaf has included the Mohammed bin Rashid Smart Learning Program into its curriculum, in line with the Ministry of Education's educational standards. In conjunction with this initiative, ARA Petroleum, in collaboration with the Ministry of Education, has begun on a major project to construct a digital studio exclusively for the Al Amal School for the Deaf. Under a Memorandum of Understanding (MOU) between ARA and the Ministry of Education, ARA has assumed financial responsibility for the project. This covers funding the design phase as well as purchasing all of the necessary equipment to run the digital teaching studio.

== Service Accessibility ==
In 2009, Hilde Haualand conducted an international survey to investigate the availability of sign language interpreters, as well as the training and support provided to the Deaf population. The study included the Middle East and North Africa (MENA) region within its scope.

Each participating country in the poll had a representative who answered five yes/no questions. The UAE gained three points, indicating that they answered yes to the first three questions. The questions were:

1. If the deaf could access government services
2. If there is a "Sign Language interpreting service" in their country
3. If Interpreters have any interpreting qualifications
4. If there is a Code of Ethics for Interpreters
5. If the government was responsible for their salaries
