= Yemeni Sign Language =

Deaf sign language of Yemen

- لغة الإشارة اليمنية
- Native to: Yemen
- Language family: Arab Sign Language family: Yemeni Sign Language

Language codes
- ISO 639-3: None (mis)
- Glottolog: yeme1237

Yemeni Sign Language (Arabic: لغة الإشارة اليمنية, romanized: Lughat al-Ishārah al-Yamanīyah) is the (or a) deaf sign language of Yemen. It belongs to the Arab sign-language family (Hendriks 2008). It is not clear how close are the sign languages of the two former Yemeni states.
