= Douentza Sign Language =

Deaf sign language of Mali

Douentza Sign
- Dogon Sign
- Native to: Mali
- Region: Douentza
- Native speakers: est. 700–1300 deaf in the area (2013)
- Language family: Deaf-community sign language

Language codes
- ISO 639-3: None (mis)
- Glottolog: doue1234

Douentza Sign Language, or Dogon Sign Language is a community sign language spoken in Douentza and neighboring communities in the Dogon country in Mali. It is unknown how similar it may be to the nearby village sign language, Tebul Sign Language, but it may be unrelated to another sign language of the Dogon region, Berbey Sign Language. As of 2013, there is no school for the deaf in the area, but one is planned; the introduction of American Sign Language as the language of instruction may affect Douentza Sign. A video corpus has been collected by the Max Planck Institute for Psycholinguistics to document the pre-contact form of the language.
