= Qatari Unified Sign Language =

Deaf sign language of Qatar

Qatari Sign Language
- Qatari Sign Language لغة الأشارة القطرية
- Native to: Qatar
- Language family: Perhaps an Arab sign language

Language codes
- ISO 639-3: None (mis)
- Glottolog: None

Qatari Unified Sign Language (Arabic: لغة الإشارة القطرية, romanized: Lughat al-Ishārah al-Qaṭarīyah) is a proposal by the Qatari Supreme Council for Family Affairs to unify the deaf sign language, or perhaps languages, of Qatar. A dictionary has been published. The council's description suggests that sign language in Qatar may belong to the Arab Sign Language family.
