= Qahveh Khaneh Sign Language =

Deaf sign language of Tehran, Iran

- Native to: Iran
- Region: Tehran
- Native speakers: (moribund)
- Language family: deaf-community sign language

Language codes
- ISO 639-3: None (mis)
- Glottolog: qahv1234

Qahveh Khaneh Sign Language (Persian: زبان اشاره قهوه‌خانه, romanized: zaban eshareh ghehveykhaneh), literally Coffee House Sign Language, is a deaf sign language of a few elderly members of the deaf community in Tehran. It has been in use since 1900 or earlier. It is unknown if it is related to Iranian Sign Language; it is possible that it descends from an ancestral form of Iranian Sign Language, dating to before that language was standardized.
