= Kuwaiti Sign Language =

Deaf sign language of Kuwait

- لغة الاشارة الكويتية
- Native to: Kuwait
- Language family: Arab Sign Language family?: Kuwaiti Sign Language

Language codes
- ISO 639-3: None (mis)
- Glottolog: kuwa1252

Kuwaiti Sign Language (Arabic: لغة الإشارة الكويتية, romanized: Lughat al-Ishārah al-Kuwaytīyah) is the deaf sign language of Kuwait. It appears to belong to the Arab sign language family (Hendriks 2008).
