= Omani Sign Language =

Deaf sign language of Oman

- لغة الإشارة العمانية
- Native to: Oman
- Language family: Perhaps an Arab sign language

Language codes
- ISO 639-3: None (mis)
- Glottolog: None

Omani Sign language (Arabic: لغة الإشارة العمانية, romanized: Lughat al-Ishārah al-ʻUmānīyah) is used by at least some of the deaf population of Oman. It is not clear if there is a single language across the country, or if it is distinct from the sign language of neighboring countries. Authorities providing training to the police for sign translators speak only of "Arabic Sign Language".

The Royal Oman Police has provided interpreters to all units.
