= Berbey Sign Language =

Family sign language of Mali

- Native to: Mali
- Region: Mount Hombori
- Native speakers: 5 deaf in two families, plus hearing members (2019)
- Language family: family sign

Language codes
- ISO 639-3: None (mis)
- Glottolog: berb1261

Berbey Sign Language is a family sign language of the village of Berbey in the Hombori region of Mali. The local oral language is Humburi Senni. The language is currently spoken by two brothers (one of whom is deaf) and their families, including four deaf children. In the brothers' father's generation, all signers were deaf.

== See also ==
- Douentza Sign Language
