= Hashem Ghazal =

Palestinian Deaf carpenter

- هاشم غزل
- Born: 1967
- Died: May 13 2024 (aged 56–57); Gaza Strip, Palestine

Hashem Ghazal (Arabic: هاشم غزل; 1967–May 13, 2024) was a disability rights activist and carpenter in Gaza City.

== Biography ==
Ghazal was born in 1967 as the youngest of nine children to a Deaf father and hearing mother. He and five of his siblings were born Deaf. His father died when he was three years old, and his mother raised and educated him at home. She entered him into vocational training at age 11 where he learned carpentry, and they eventually established a home woodshop. He married a hearing woman and together had nine children, six of whom are also Deaf.

After the birth of his eldest daughter, Ghazal considered leaving Gaza due to the lack of support for Deaf children when a friend told him about Atfaluna Society for Deaf Children. He became involved in 1994 and ran the Carpentry Department, where he taught carpentry to hearing impaired students. He was a prominent member and became known as "Godfather of the Deaf" in the Gaza Strip.

In 2014, Ghazal was featured in the Al-Jazeera documentary "Stronger than words" about the Deaf community in Gaza. His daughter, Israh, was also interviewed about her role as a hearing guide to help family members find shelter during the 2014 Gaza War. In 2015, he gave a TedXShujaiya presentation called "Let the fingers do the talk." He also gave presentations about the Gaza Deaf community in other countries.

In the Gaza war, Ghazal's home and workshop were destroyed and he sheltered alongside several family members. He was often interviewed by journalists as a voice of the Gazan Deaf community. His wife would act as translator and guide for the household, as the Deaf members could sense bombings from vibrations but often were unaware of evacuation sirens or exits. As it was too dangerous for Ghazal and other Deaf family to retrieve food from service points without a hearing guide, Ghazal lost 35 kilos due to lack of nutrition and started gardening.

On May 13, 2024, Ghazal and his wife were killed by an Israeli air strike. Seven of his children were severely wounded by the attack.
