= Mayan Sign Language =

Sign language used by Mayan communities in Mexico and Guatemala

Maya Sign Language
- Native to: Mexico, Guatemala
- Region: Isolated villages in south-central Yucatán, Guatemalan Highlands
- Native speakers: 17 deaf in Chican (2012); 400 hearing signers Chican (1999); unknown number elsewhere
- Language family: Meemul Chʼaabʼal / Meemul Tziij
- Dialects: Highland Maya Sign; Yucatec (Chicán, Nohkop, Nohya, Trascorral, Cepeda, Peraza)

Language codes
- ISO 639-3: msd
- Glottolog: yuca1236
- ELP: Yucatec Maya Sign Language
- Various sign languages of Turtle Island (North America), excluding Francosign languages. The Maya sign languages are labelled in brown.

Mayan Sign Language (Spanish: Lengua de señas maya or yucateca) is a sign language used in Mexico and Guatemala by Mayan communities with unusually high numbers of deaf inhabitants. In some instances, both hearing and deaf members of a village may use the sign language. It is unrelated to the national sign languages of Mexico (Mexican Sign Language) and Guatemala (Guatemalan Sign Language), as well as to the local spoken Mayan languages and Spanish.

== Yucatec Mayan Sign Language ==
Yucatec Maya Sign Language, is used in the Yucatán region by both hearing and deaf rural Maya. It is a natural, complex language which is not related to Mexican Sign Language, but may have similarities with sign languages found in nearby Guatemala.

As the hearing villagers are competent in the sign language, the deaf inhabitants seem to be well integrated into the community – in contrast to the marginalization of deaf people in the wider community, and also in contrast to Highland Mayan Sign Language.

The oral language of the community is the Yucatec Maya language.

== Highland Mayan Sign Language ==
In the highlands of Guatemala, Maya use a sign language that belongs to a "sign language complex" known locally in the Kʼicheʼ language as Meemul Chʼaabʼal and Meemul Tziij, "mute language." Researcher Erich Fox Tree reports that it is used by deaf rural Maya throughout the region, as well as some traders and traditional storytellers. These communities and Fox Tree believe that Meemul Chʼaabʼal belongs to an ancient family of Maya sign languages. Fox Tree claims that Yucatec Maya Sign Language is closely related and substantially mutually intelligible.
