= Paraguayan Sign Language =

Deaf sign language of Paraguay

- Native to: Paraguay
- Native speakers: 15,000 (2009)
- Language family: Paraguay–Uruguay Sign Language family?

Language codes
- ISO 639-3: pys
- Glottolog: para1318

Paraguayan Sign Language (Spanish: Lengua de señas paraguaya, LSPy), is the deaf sign language of Paraguay. It is not intelligible with neighboring languages, nor with American Sign Language, but speakers report that it has historical connections with Uruguayan Sign Language. It developed outside the schools, and was only used in education in 2009.

Paraguay is notably a bilingual country, where both Spanish and Guarani are spoken. The Language Law No. 4251 provides for fingerspelling adequate to both languages.

One of the institutions offering LSPY courses is the Yvy Marãe'ỹ Foundation.

== Bibliography ==
- Lichtenberger, Wilfried. 1990. Habla Conmigo: primer libro de aprendizaje de la lengua para escolares principiantes con difficultades en el lenguaje. Asunción: Centro Editorial Paraguayo S.R.L.
- Lichtenberger, Wilfried. 1990. Guia linguistica y didactica del Habla Conmigo: primer libro de aprendizaje de la lengua para escolares principiantes con difficultades en el lenguaje para el Profesor especial. Asunción.
