= Old Kentish Sign Language =

Former sign language of Kent, England

- OKSL
- Native to: formerly the United Kingdom
- Region: Kent, England
- Extinct: 17th century?
- Language family: village sign

Language codes
- ISO 639-3: okl
- Glottolog: oldk1238

Old Kentish Sign Language (OKSL), also known as Old Kent Sign Language, was a village sign language of 17th-century Kent in the United Kingdom, that has been incorporated along with other village sign languages into British Sign Language.

According to Peter Webster Jackson (2001), OKSL may have been the language used by a deaf boy described by 17th century British writer Samuel Pepys in his Diaries. Pepys was dining with his friend Sir George Downing on 9 November 1666, when the deaf servant had a conversation in sign language with his master, which included news of the Great Fire of London. Downing had been to school near Maidstone in Kent, where he lived in a community where congenital deafness was widespread. This population supported a sign language which was known by many hearing people as well as deaf.

As settlers of the Martha's Vineyard communities of Tisbury and Chilmark in Massachusetts migrated from the Kentish Weald, Nora Groce (1985) speculates that OKSL may be the origin of Martha's Vineyard Sign Language, which is, in turn, one of the precursors of American Sign Language (ASL). Others have cautioned against uncritical reception of this claim, "because no deaf people were part of the original migration from Kent, and nothing is known about any specific variety of signing used in Kent."
