= Martha's Vineyard Sign Language =

Extinct sign language of Massachusetts

- MVSL
- Native to: United States
- Region: Martha's Vineyard
- Extinct: 1952, with the death of Katie West
- Language family: Village sign language
- Early forms: Old Kentish Sign Language, possibly Wampanoag Hand Talk: Chilmark Sign Language
- Dialects: Sandy River Valley SL?

Language codes
- ISO 639-3: mre
- Glottolog: mart1251
- ELP: Martha's Vineyard Sign Language

Martha's Vineyard Sign Language (MVSL) was a village sign language that was once widely used on the island of Martha's Vineyard, United States, from the early 18th century to 1952. It was used by both deaf and hearing people in the community; consequently, deafness was not a barrier to participation in public life. Deaf people who signed Martha's Vineyard Sign Language were extremely independent.

The language was able to thrive because of the unusually high percentage of deaf islanders and because deafness was a recessive trait, which meant that almost anyone might have both deaf and hearing siblings. In 1854, when the island's deaf population peaked, an average of one person in 155 was deaf, while the United States national average was one in about 5,730. In the town of Chilmark, which had the highest concentration of deaf people on the island, the average was 1 in 25; at one point, in a section of Chilmark called Squibnocket, as much as 1 in 4 of the population of 60 was deaf.

Sign language on the island declined when the population migrated to the mainland. There are no fluent signers of MVSL today. Katie West, the last deaf person born into the island's sign-language tradition, died in 1952, though there were a few elderly residents still able to recall MVSL when researchers started examining the language in the 1980s. Linguists are working to save the language, but their task is difficult because they cannot experience MVSL firsthand.

== History ==
=== Native American influences ===
The main influences of native sign languages are likely from Eastern Woodlands Algonquian sign language.

Given the location of Martha’s Vineyard, the Massachusetts and Wampanoag likely had the most significant linguistic influences on the island. Massachusett was also used as a common spoken language of peoples throughout New England and Long Island, particularly in a simplified pidgin form. The missionary John Eliot learned the language from bilingual translators and interpreters.

Prior to the introduction of literacy by the missionary Eliot, the Massachusett-speaking peoples were mainly an orally transmitted culture, with social taboos, mores, customs, legends, history, knowledge and traditions passed from the elders to the next generation through song, stories and discussion. With peoples from farther away, speakers switched to a pidgin variety of Massachusett used across New England, but when spoken language failed, sign language was used.

Little is known about the Eastern Woodlands Algonquian sign language other than its usage. Lenape were often recruited in the wars with the Indians of the west because of their ability to effectively communicate in silence. The sign language of the Wampanoag of Martha's Vineyard likely influenced MVSL, due to the shared interactions of the Wampanoag with the large population of English colonists who were deaf and signed. In this manner, Eastern Woodlands Algonquian sign language likely influenced the emergence of American Sign Language (ASL), and thus all the globally descended languages of ASL as well. Martha's Vineyard Sign Language went extinct at the beginning of the twentieth century, but many of its users were influential in the development of ASL. Little is known of it other than its existence, but it was likely similar in scope and usage such as extant Plains Indian Sign Language.

=== Origins ===
Lecture on the history of Martha's Vineyard Sign Language by Joan Poole-Nash

Hereditary deafness had appeared on Martha's Vineyard by 1714. The ancestry of most of the deaf population of Martha's Vineyard can be traced to a forested area in the south of England known as the Weald—specifically the part of the Weald in the county of Kent. Martha's Vineyard Sign Language (MVSL) may be descended from a hypothesized sign language of that area in the 16th century, now referred to as Old Kent Sign Language. Families from a Puritan community in the Kentish Weald emigrated to the Massachusetts Bay Colony in British America in the early 17th century, and many of their descendants later settled on Martha's Vineyard. The first deaf person known to have settled there was Jonathan Lambert, a carpenter and farmer, who moved there with his wife—who was not deaf—in 1694. By 1710, the migration had virtually ceased, and the endogamous community that was created contained a high incidence of hereditary deafness that persisted for over 200 years.

In the town of Chilmark, which had the highest concentration of deaf people on the island, the average was 1 in 25; at one point, in a section of Chilmark called Squibnocket, as much as 1 in 4 of the population of 60 was deaf. By the 18th century there was a distinct Chilmark Sign Language. In the 19th century, this was influenced by French Sign Language, and evolved into MVSL in the 19th and 20th centuries. From the late 18th to the early 20th century, virtually everybody on Martha's Vineyard possessed some degree of fluency in the language.

Although the people who were dependent on MVSL were different, they still did the same activities as the typical Martha's Vineyard resident would. Deaf people would work both complex and simple jobs, attend island events, and participate within the community. In contrast to some other deaf communities around the world, they were treated as typical people. Other deaf communities are often isolated from the hearing population; the Martha's Vineyard deaf community of that period is exceptional in its integration into the general population.

Deaf MVSL users were not excluded by the rest of society at Martha's Vineyard, but they certainly faced challenges due to their deafness. Marriage between a deaf person and a hearing person was extremely difficult to maintain, even though both could use MVSL. For this reason, the deaf usually married the deaf, raising the degree of inbreeding even beyond that of the general population of Martha's Vineyard. This high rate of deaf–deaf marriages increased the deaf population within the community over time, as all offspring of such couples inherited their parents' shared recessive deafness trait and were also congenitally deaf. The MVSL users often associated closely, helping and working with each other to overcome other issues caused by deafness. They entertained at community events, teaching hearing youngsters more MVSL. The sign language was spoken and taught to hearing children as early as their first years to help them communicate with the many deaf people they would encounter in school. Non-manual markers, such as lip movement and facial expressions, as well as hand gestures and mannerisms were all studied. There were even separate schools specifically for learning MVSL. Hearing people sometimes signed even when there were no deaf people present. For example, children signed behind a schoolteacher's back, adults signed to one another during church sermons, farmers signed to their children across a wide field, and fishermen signed to each other from their boats across the water where the spoken word would not carry.

=== Deaf migration to the mainland ===
In the early 19th century, a new educational philosophy began to emerge on the mainland, and the country's first school for the deaf opened in 1817 in Hartford, Connecticut (now called the American School for the Deaf). Many of the deaf children of Martha's Vineyard enrolled there, taking their sign language with them. The language of the teachers was French Sign Language, and many of the other deaf students used their own home-sign systems. This school became known as the birthplace of the deaf community in the United States, and the different sign systems used there, including MVSL, merged to become American Sign Language (ASL)—now one of the largest community languages in the country.

As more deaf people remained on the mainland, and others who returned brought with them deaf spouses they met there (whose hearing loss may not have been due to the same hereditary cause), the line of hereditary deafness began to diminish. At the outset of the 20th century, the previously isolated community of fishers and farmers began to see an influx of tourists that would become a mainstay in the island's economy. Jobs in tourism were not as deaf-friendly as fishing and farming had been, and as intermarriage and migration joined the people of Martha's Vineyard to the mainland, the island community grew to resemble the wider community there more and more.

The last deaf person born into the island's sign-language tradition, Katie West, died in 1952. A few elderly residents were able to recall MVSL as recently as the 1980s when research into the language began. Indeed, when Oliver Sacks subsequently visited the island after reading a book on the subject, he noted that a group of elderly islanders talking together dropped briefly into sign language then back into speech.

=== Decline ===
Martha's Vineyard Sign Language declined after the opening of the American School for the Deaf. Although students from Martha's Vineyard influenced the creation of ASL with contributions from MVSL when they returned home, they brought ASL usage back with them, and MVSL faded. Additionally, as transportation became easier in the 19th century, the influx of hearing people meant that more genetic diversity was introduced, and hereditary deafness was no longer commonplace. The last person in the line of hereditary deafness of Martha's Vineyard was Katie West, who died in 1952. Following her death, Oliver Sacks noted in the 1980s that some elderly hearing residents of the island could remember a few signs, but the language truly died out after this point.

=== Resurgence ===
In recent years, there has been a push to reintroduce American Sign Language into the Island's culture. A Martha's Vineyard resident, Lynn Thorp, began her mission to revive ASL in the early 2000s with the ultimate goal of reinstating ASL as a second language. After studying the language through references such as Everyone Here Spoke Sign Language by Ellen Groce, and a series of 1989 teachings called "Interax", Thorp began meeting with fellow Vineyard residents every week to practice sign language together. About a decade later, Thorp began teaching classes regularly at local community centers. As of 2020, the Edgartown Elementary School had adopted ASL into their regular curriculum, and other Martha's Vineyard Public Schools were open to integrating ASL into their curriculum.

== In popular culture ==
Show Me a Sign (2020) by Ann Clare LeZotte is a middle grade novel about the thriving deaf community living on Martha's Vineyard in the early part of the 19th century. In the novel deaf and hearing characters successfully use Martha's Vineyard Sign Language to communicate with each other.

== See also ==
- Founder effect
- List of extinct languages of North America
- List of sign languages
