= Turkish Sign Language =

Deaf sign language of Turkey

- Türk İşaret Dili
- Native to: Turkey, Northern Cyprus
- Signers: 250,000 (2021)
- Language family: Language isolate
- Early form: Possibly from Ottoman Sign Language

Language codes
- ISO 639-3: tsm
- Glottolog: turk1288

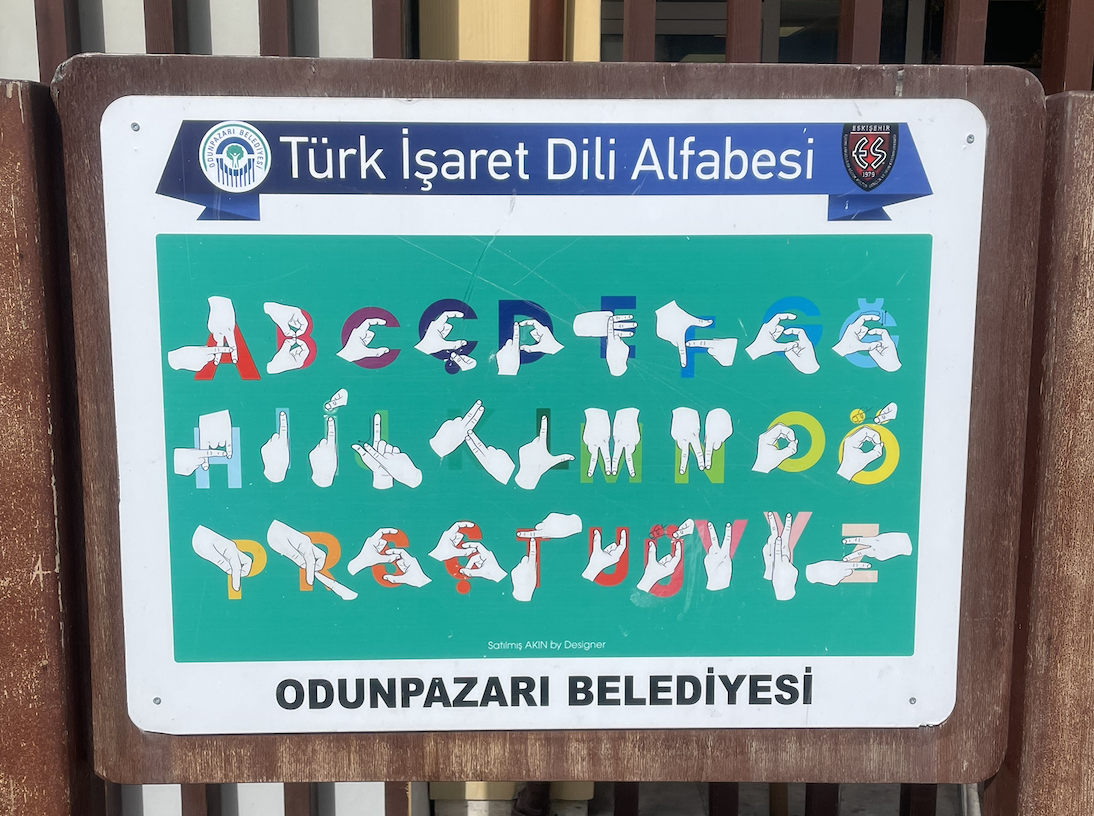
Plaque showing the alphabet for Turkish Sign Language in Odunparzarı

Turkish Sign Language (Turkish: Türk İşaret Dili, TİD) is the language used by the deaf community in Turkey. As with other sign languages, TİD has a unique grammar that is different from the oral languages used in the region.

TİD uses a two-handed manual alphabet which is very different from the two-handed alphabets used in the BANZSL sign languages. It also uses the tongue in certain phrases.

== Grammar ==
There is little published information on Turkish Sign Language. Turkish Sign Language exhibits a subject-object-verb order (SOV). There is a rich set of modal verbs which appear in a clause-final position.

== Signing communities ==
As an estimate of the size of the TiD’s community, there are a total of 89,000 people (54,000 male, 35,000 female) with hearing impairment and 55,000 people (35,000 male, 21,000 female) with speaking disability living in Turkey, according to the Turkish Statistical Institute based on year 2000 census data.

== History ==
TİD is dissimilar from European sign languages. There was a court sign language of the Ottoman Empire, which reached its height in the 16th century and 17th centuries and lasted at least until the early 20th. However, there is no record of the signs themselves and no evidence the language was ancestral to modern Turkish Sign Language.

Deaf schools were established in 1902, and until 1953 used TİD alongside the Turkish spoken and written language in education. Since 1953 Turkey has adopted an oralist approach to deaf education.

== See also ==
- Sign language
- Deafness
- Deafness in Turkey
