= Sandy River Valley Sign Language =

Deaf sign language used in the US

Sandy River Valley Sign
- Native to: United States
- Region: Sandy River Valley, Maine
- Era: 19th century
- Language family: Martha's Vineyard Sign Language?

Language codes
- ISO 639-3: None (mis)
- Glottolog: None

Sandy River Valley Sign Language was a village sign language of the 19th-century Sandy River Valley in Maine. Together with the more famous Martha's Vineyard Sign Language and Henniker Sign Language, it was one of three local languages which formed the basis of American Sign Language.

The deaf communities in the valley developed in some of the thirty villages founded by settlers from Martha's Vineyard. However, it is not clear whether MVSL itself was transmitted, or if the chain was broken and a new sign language was created once a substantial deaf population was established.
