= Iraqi Sign Language =

Deaf sign language of Iraq

- لغة الإشارة العراقية
- Native to: Iraq
- Language family: Arab sign-language family: Iraqi–Levantine?; Iraqi Sign Language

Language codes
- ISO 639-3: None (mis)
- Glottolog: iraq1246

Iraqi Sign Language (Arabic: لغة الإشارة العراقية, romanized: luḡa al-išāra al-ʿIrāqiyya) is the deaf sign language of Iraq. It appears to be close to Levantine Arabic Sign Language, the common sign language of Lebanon, Palestine, Syria, and Jordan. It is taught in seven schools or deaf associations in the capital of Baghdad and 5 other cities.

== Related Sign Languages ==
In research done on Jordanian Sign Language, word lists from Baghdad were collected and compared to sign language from five other countries. It was found to have over 50% lexical similarities with the sign languages of Jordan and Syria.

== See also ==
- Kurdish Sign Language
- Levantine Arabic Sign Language
