= Providence Island Sign Language =

Sign language of Providence Island

- Provisle
- Native to: Colombia
- Region: Providence Island
- Native speakers: 19 deaf (1986); Known by the majority of the 2,500–3,000 population
- Language family: village sign: Providencia–Cayman Sign?; Providence Island Sign Language

Language codes
- ISO 639-3: prz
- Glottolog: prov1243
- ELP: Providencia Sign Language
- Various sign languages of Turtle Island (North America), excluding Francosign languages. Provisle is labelled in pink.

Providence Island Sign Language (PISL; Spanish: Lengua de señas de Providencia), also known as Provisle, is a village sign language of the small island community of Providence Island in the Western Caribbean, off the coast of Nicaragua but belonging to Colombia. The island is about 15 square miles (39 km^{2}) and the total population is about 5,000, of which an unusual proportion are deaf (5 in 1,000).

It is believed that the sign language emerged in the late 19th or early 20th century. Brief sociological studies have suggested that deaf people on the island are regarded as inferior in mental ability; hearing people do not discuss complex ideas with them, and they hold a marginalized social position. Perhaps consequently, PISL is rather simplistic in comparison to other sign languages. Another possibility for the state of the language is that few deaf people communicate directly, meaning that almost all signing is mediated by the hearing population.
