= Honduran Sign Language =

Deaf sign language of Honduras

- Native to: Honduras
- Native speakers: 40,000 (2021)
- Language family: Costa Rica-Honduras-Panama Sign?: Honduran Sign Language

Language codes
- ISO 639-3: hds
- Glottolog: hond1239
- ELP: Honduras Sign Language

Honduran Sign Language (Spanish: Lengua de señas hondureña, LESHO) is the dominant sign language used in Honduras. American Sign Language is also used; the two are not related.
