= Uruguayan Sign Language =

Official deaf sign language of Uruguay

- Lengua de señas uruguaya
- Native to: Uruguay
- Native speakers: 7,000 (2009)
- Language family: Paraguay–Uruguay Sign Language family?

Language codes
- ISO 639-3: ugy
- Glottolog: urug1238
- ELP: Uruguayan Sign Language

Uruguayan Sign Language (Spanish: Lengua de señas uruguaya, LSU) is the deaf sign language of Uruguay. It has been in use since 1910, and in 2001, LSU was recognized as an official language of Uruguay under Law 17.378.

Uruguayan Sign Language may be considered a language isolate as it is not mutually intelligible with neighboring languages, though some historical connections with Paraguayan Sign Language are attested.

== History ==
Uruguayan Sign Language has been in continual use since 1910, with the creation of the Ana Bruzzone de Scarone School for the Deaf (Spanish: Escuela Ana Bruzzone de Scarone). However, the origins of LSU reach back to 1891 according to the register of the Instituto Nacional de Sordomudos kept by Manuel Collazo Villar, a professor from Spain who relocated to Uruguay and who was in led the first class of deaf students. That register identifies that the methodology was gestural (as opposed to lip reading), using both sign and a manual alphabet. One of the deaf graduates of Collazo Villar was Ernesto Ucar, founder and first president of ASUR (the Uruguayan Association of the Deaf, Spanish: Asociación de Sordos del Uruguay) and father of the Deaf community in Uruguay.

In 1987, the plan for bilingual education in the schools for the deaf was approved, but it wasn't until 1996 that Uruguayan high schools started to provide interpreters for deaf students (the first being Liceo 32 Guayabó in 1996 and IAVA in 1999). Almost 10 years later, the deaf students at the University of the Republic (Spanish: Universidad de la República, or UDELAR) were provided with interpretation services in LSU.

In 2001 LSU was recognized as an official language of Uruguay by Law N.º 17378 thanks to joint initiatives by ASUR, CINDE (the Research and Development Center for the Deaf, Spanish: Centro de Investigación y Desarrollo para la Persona Sorda), and APASU (The Uruguayan Association of Parents and Friends of the Deaf, Spanish: Asociación de Padres y Amigos de Sordos del Uruguay).

A bilingual LSU-Spanish dictionary was published in 2007 by a joint initiative of CINDE and ASUR.

National LSU Day has been celebrated July 25th since 2020, proposed by ASUR and embraced by the Deaf community in Uruguay. July 25 was chosen for two reasons: it celebrates the anniversary of the 2001 law recognizing LSU as an official language, and it celebrates the anniversary of the 1910 founding of the Ana Bruzzone de Scarone School for the Deaf.
