= Ottoman Sign Language =

Extinct deaf sign language

- Seraglio Sign Language
- Harem Sign Language
- Native to: Turkey
- Region: Istanbul
- Era: 15th to early 20th century
- Language family: Deaf-community sign language

Language codes
- ISO 639-3: None (mis)
- Glottolog: None

Ottoman Sign Language (Turkish: Osmanlı İşaret Dili), also known as Seraglio Sign Language (Saray İşaret Dili) or Harem Sign Language (Harem İşaret Dili), was a deaf sign language of the Ottoman court in Istanbul. Nothing is known of it directly, but it is reported that it could communicate ideas of any complexity, and that it was passed on to the young through fables, histories, and scripture.

== History ==
During the reign of Suleiman the Magnificent, two deaf brothers were brought to the court. During this time, keeping disabled people at royal courts as oddities or pets was a fairly common practice (see court dwarf). These brothers were originally brought to court as such. They knew a sign language, likely a home sign of their own invention. Out of this, the practice was born.

In 16th and 17th centuries, deaf pages, doormen, executioners, and companions of the sultan were valued for their ability to communicate silently, for their inability to overhear sensitive information at secret negotiations, and for the difficulty outsiders had in communicating with them or bribing them. At court, silence was at a premium, and several sultans preferred that sign language be used in their presence; they were able to jest with them in a way that would be inappropriately familiar in Turkish. Osman II (r. 1618–1622) was perhaps the first sultan to learn to sign, and ordered many of the hearing of his court to follow his lead. At their height, there may have been over a hundred deaf courtiers at any one time; it was considered undignified for the sultan to address his subjects orally, and also unseemly for those before him either to speak aloud, disturbing him, or to whisper secretly.

It is not known whether Ottoman Sign Language was ancestral to modern Turkish Sign Language, as no signs were recorded.

== Gallery ==
The Rålamb Costume Book contains drawings of signing dilsiz, "deaf-mutes".

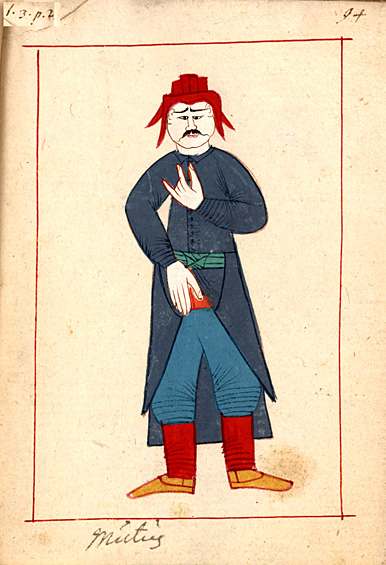

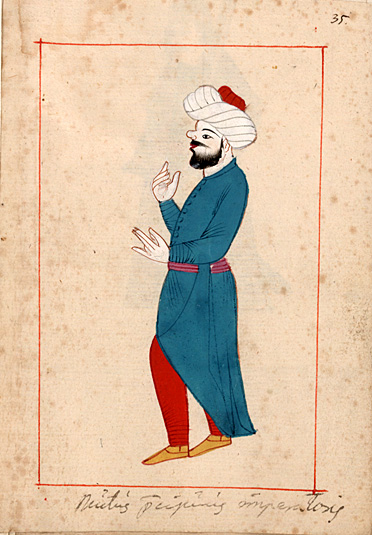

== See also ==
- Deafness in Türkiye

== Bibliography ==
- Miles, M. (2000). "Signing in the Seraglio: Mutes, dwarfs and jestures at the Ottoman Court 1500-1700". Disability & Society. 15 (1): 115–134. doi:10.1080/09687590025801. S2CID 145331019.
- Miles, M. (2009), Deaf People, Sign Language and Communication, in Ottoman and Modern Turkey: Observations and Excerpts from 1300 to 2009, Internet publication
- Mirzoeff, Nicholas (1995). "Framed: the deaf in the harem". In Terry, Jennifer; Urla, Jacqueline (eds.). Deviant bodies: critical perspectives on difference in science and popular culture. Indiana University Press. pp. 49–77 – via Internet Archive.
- Richardson, Kristina (2017). "New Evidence for Early Modern Ottoman Arabic and Turkish Sign Systems". Sign Language Studies. 17 (2). Gallaudet University Press: 172–192. doi:10.1353/sls.2017.0001. JSTOR 26191034.
- Scalenghe, Sara (2014). "Deafness and Muteness". Disability in the Ottoman Arab World, 1500–1800. Cambridge University Press. pp. 21–51. doi:10.1017/CBO9781107045309.003. ISBN 9781139916899 – via Google Books.
