= Libyan Sign Language =

Deaf sign language of Libya

- Native to: Libya
- Native speakers: 20,000 (2021)
- Language family: Arab Sign Language family?: Libyan Sign Language

Language codes
- ISO 639-3: lbs
- Glottolog: liby1235

Libyan Sign Language (Arabic: لغة الإشارة الليبية, romanized: Lughat al-Ishārah al-Lībīyah) is the deaf sign language of Libya. It appears to belong to the Arab sign language family (Hendriks 2008).

== Sources ==
- Hendriks, Bernadet, 2008. Jordanian Sign Language: aspects of grammar from a cross-linguistic perspective (dissertation)
- Suwed, Abdalla A. 1984. Lughat Al-Ishara Al-`Arabiyah: Laughat As-Sum. Tripoli, Libya: Al-Mansha'ah Al Aamah Lin-Nasher wal I'lam.
