= Azerbaijani Sign Language =

Language which is used by deaf community in Azarbaijani

- AİD; Azərbaycan işarət dili
- Native to: Azerbaijan
- Signers: 31,000 (2009)
- Language family: French Sign: Austro-Hungarian Sign; Russian Sign; Azerbaijani Sign Language

Language codes
- ISO 639-3: None (mis)
- IETF: rsl-AZ

Azerbaijani Sign Language (Azerbaijani: Azərbaycan işarət dili, AİD; Azərbaycan jest dili, AzJD) is the sign language used by the deaf community in Azerbaijan. As with other sign languages, AİD has a unique grammar that differs from the oral languages used in the region. There are approximately 31,000 deaf people in Azerbaijan. Azerbaijani Sign Language is not recognized as an official language by Azerbaijan, nor does not have any language codes.

Azerbaijani Sign Language is based on Russian Sign Language.

== History ==
There are two Republican Special Boarding Schools in Azerbaijan that only serve members of the Azerbaijani deaf community. Although their sign language is not officially recognized, Azerbaijan's deaf community is a member of the World Deaf Federation (WDF). In international conferences and meetings, Russian Sign Language is used instead of Azerbaijani Sign Language.

== See also ==
- Sign language
- Deafness
