= Sudanese sign languages =

Sign languages of Sudan and South Sudan

Sudanese sign
- Native to: Sudan, South Sudan
- Language family: several Deaf-community sign languages, perhaps also village sign languages

Language codes
- ISO 639-3: None (mis)
- Glottolog: None

Sudan and South Sudan have multiple regional sign languages, which are not mutually intelligible. A survey of just three states found 150 sign languages, though this number included instances of home sign. Government figures estimate there are at least about 48,900 deaf people in Sudan. By 2009, the Sudanese National Union of the Deaf had worked out a Unified Sudanese Sign Language, but it had not yet been widely disseminated.
