= Moroccan Sign Language =

- MSL
- Native to: Morocco
- Region: Tetouan
- Native speakers: 63,000 (2008)MSL
- Language family: French Sign: American Sign-based creole?; Moroccan Sign Language

Language codes
- ISO 639-3: xms
- Glottolog: moro1242

Moroccan Sign Language (MSL; French: language des signes du Maroc/langue des signes marocaine (LSM)) is the primary sign language used by the deaf community in Tétouan and several other cities and regions of Morocco.

Moroccan Sign Language was created by American Peace Corps volunteers in Tetouan c. 1987, from American Sign Language (ASL) and existing signs; there is less than a 50% lexical similarity with ASL. It is not clear if the 'existing signs' were home sign or an established village sign language. The language is used in three programs for the deaf, but not throughout the country: it is not used in the large cities of Rabat, Tangier, or Casa Blanca, for example. In Oujda, near the Algerian border, Algerian Sign Language is used, or at least the local sign language has been strongly influenced by it.

The language has also been strongly influenced by French Sign Language (LSF). MSL is part of the wider family of sign languages influenced by ASL and has developed its own distinct linguistic identity. Moroccan Sign Language was recognized in 1994 in national legislation. The language plays a key role in Deaf education, though access remains uneven, and much deaf education occurs in private centers with limited government oversight. Recent initiatives have focused on increasing access through digital tools and teacher training.

== History ==
The development of Moroccan Sign Language (MSL) is closely tied to the broader history of deaf education in the Arab world during the twentieth century. Across the region, informal schools for the Deaf began emerging in cities such as Amman (1947) and Beirut (1957). The first school for the deaf in Morocco was founded in 1957. The first scientific committee on Deaf education, organized by the Arab Federation of Organizations Working with the Deaf (AFOOD) which was held in Damascus in 1984, introduced a unified Fingerspelling and fingerspelling system for Modern Standard. In the early 2000s, AFOOD, ALECSO, and the SCFA published dictionaries of a Unified Arabic Sign Language (UASL) to strengthen regional linguistic unity, though such artificial systems could not replace natural national Sign languages.

Moroccan Sign Language was recognized in 1994 in national legislation. Morocco followed this by creating a national sign language dictionary, but it remained little used. Moreover, in 2009, Morocco signed the UN Protocol on the Rights of Persons with Disabilities. In practice, local sign systems continued to dominate, especially after American Sign Language (ASL) was introduced by Peace Corps volunteers in Tétouan in the late 1980s. These influences merged into what is now known as Moroccan Sign Language, a distinct system influenced by both ASL and French Sign Language.

== Status ==
Despite being recognised as a language within Morocco, due to its linguistic diversity and lack of standardisation, MSL does not have official status, posing an obstacle to its unification and implementation in institutions. However, various different programmes and groups are working towards its standardisation, which would benefit all users of MSL. This has contributed to a growing movement and awareness reflecting the need for official recognition of Moroccan sign language as a language with official status for matters of inclusion and education. This can be seen in scholarly literature and the work of NGOs, local organisations and Universities such as the Mohammed V University. Additionally, in 2016, the United Nations Development Programme granted 7 million dirhams to the Ministry of Solidarity, Social Development, Equality, and Family for a project of standardization of Moroccan sign language and the training of interpreters. This project is still under way involving other government organisations who are also working towards finalising the standardisation of MSL and providing further support for the deaf community. Significant progress has been made through the creation of online learning platforms for example, but the lack of standardisation of the language still remains an obstacle in relation to it being adopted as an official language.

== Linguistic Features and Digital Encoding ==
Moroccan Sign Language (MSL) uses 'cheremes' as its basic linguistic units, similar to phonemes in spoken languages. Cheremes serve as the fundamental elements of the signed communication in MSL, and each sign can be analysed through four parameters classified as 'tab' (location), 'dez' (handshape), 'sig' (motion) and 'ori' (orientation). Facial expressions and mouth movements are also phonemic in MSL. Fingerspelling is included in the education of MSL users in spelling and reading of standard Arabic, but is not a native component of the language. This is similar to other sign languages, where fingerspelling is also mainly used to transcribe spoken-language words to facilitate reading and spelling.

MSL lacks a conventional alphabet or standard writing system. Signs are represented through graphics, videos, animation or formal transcription services, such as HamNoSys, which encode handshapes, motions, and locations using unique codes. Through such programs, each handshape, motion or location can be encoded with a unique code (such as HS-1, HS-2 for handshapes). A computational dataset of MSL has been compiled by professors from the University Sultan Moulay Slimane using publicly available videos. The dataset, which consists of over 2,310 clips of over 7 hours, consists of 2,069 unique words and sentences in MSL. This dataset supports research in MSL sign language recognition and computational studies of MSL, serving as a resource for technological linguistic innovation.

== Education ==
According to the Ministry of Education, as of 2019, 4,000 Deaf pupils are enrolled in primary school, spread across 90 integration classes. These are often enrolled late and in private schools. There is a lack of standardized education for Deaf students. As Moroccan Sign Language is not fully unified and standardized, classes do not use sign language. Nearly all teachers rely on writing and reading, which becomes difficult for students who do not understand the letters. There is also an high early drop out rate, as deaf children are forced into a school system that is unfamiliar to them. Due to these various factors, over 78% of the Deaf population in Morocco is illiterate, with very few Deaf people having access to middle school. In Morocco, children have primary school for six years from age 6 onwards, followed by three years of middle school and then three years of secondary or high school.

The enrollment rate of children with disabilities, and so also deaf children, in integration classes is not spread equally over all regions, types of disabilities and age groups. Many students are taught in mixed forms of language, such as inconsistent and simplified sign and exaggerated speech, with the expectation of lip-reading. In most schools Arabic and/or French are utilised, which are not fully functional for Deaf students. There are a couple schools that have adopted MSL, but teachers often lack specialized training to fully utilise this to its potential.

There has been a push towards more inclusive education policies, with the Ministry of National Education, Vocational Training, Higher Education and Scientific Research focussing more on Deaf education. As of 2011, when the right to education was established in the constitution, Morocco has sought to expand access and strengthen inclusion for all children with disabilities, including those with loss of hearing. There are significant issues within education for deaf people, currently attempts are largely being made to conduct research to fully understand the situation.
