= Old Costa Rican Sign Language =

Deaf sign language of Costa Rica

- Native to: Costa Rica
- Region: metro San Jose
- Native speakers: perhaps 100 (1991)
- Language family: deaf-community sign language

Language codes
- ISO 639-3: None (mis)
- Glottolog: orig1234
- ELP: Original Costa Rican Sign Language

Old Costa Rican Sign Language is a deaf-community sign language of San Jose, spoken by people born before about 1945. Along with American Sign Language, it is one of the sources of New Costa Rican Sign Language.
