= Levantine Arabic Sign Language =

Sign language of the Levant

Levantine Sign Language
- Syro-Palestinian Sign Language
- لغة الإشارة العربية الشرقية
- Region: Levant
- Native speakers: 30,000 (2021)
- Language family: Arab sign-language family: Iraqi–Levantine?; Levantine Sign Language
- Dialects: Jordanian Sign Language; Palestinian Sign Language; Syrian Sign Language; Lebanese Sign Language

Language codes
- ISO 639-3: jos (Jordanian Sign Language)
- Glottolog: jord1238 Levantine Arabic SL

Levantine Arabic Sign Language is the sign language used by people of the Levant, comprising Jordan, Palestine, Syria, and Lebanon. Although there are significant differences in vocabulary between the four states, this is not much greater than regional differences within the states. Grammar is quite uniform and mutual intelligibility is high, indicating that they are dialects of a single language.

The language typically goes by the name of the country, as so:

- Jordanian SL: لغة الإشارة الأردنية, Lughat il-Ishārah il-Urduniyyah (LIU)
- Lebanese SL: لغة الإشارات اللبنانية, Lughat al-Ishārāt al-Lubnāniyyah (LIL)
- Palestinian SL: لغة الاشارات الفلسطينية, Lughat al-Ishārāt al-Filisṭīniyyah (LIF)
- Syrian SL: لغة الإشارة السورية, Lughat il-Ishārah il-Sūriyyah (LIS)

== Jordanian Sign Language ==
Jordanian Sign Language (LIU) has multiple dialects, and no standard form. A dictionary of 500 LIU signs was published in 2006.

== Palestinian Sign Language ==
The first school for the deaf in Palestine opened in 1972 in Bethlehem, but sign language was not taught until the 1990s, with the opening of new schools for the deaf and the publication of a Palestinian Sign Language (LIF) dictionary by the Ramallah-based Benevolent Society for the Deaf. As of 2021, all schools for the deaf in Palestine taught at least some LIF, but the official educational LIF dictionary only contains signs up through the seventh grade syllabus.

Deaf clubs were founded in Palestine beginning in 1991 in Ramallah, and five clubs existed in the country as of 2021. These clubs serve as informal gathering spaces and educational spaces.

The first university classes in LIF were offered by Birzeit University in 2014. Formal education in LIF interpretation was not offered in Palestine until 2019.

== See also ==
- Atfaluna Society for Deaf Children, Gaza
- Holy Land Institute for the Deaf, As-Salt, Jordan
