= Four Holy Cities =

Holiest cities in Judaism

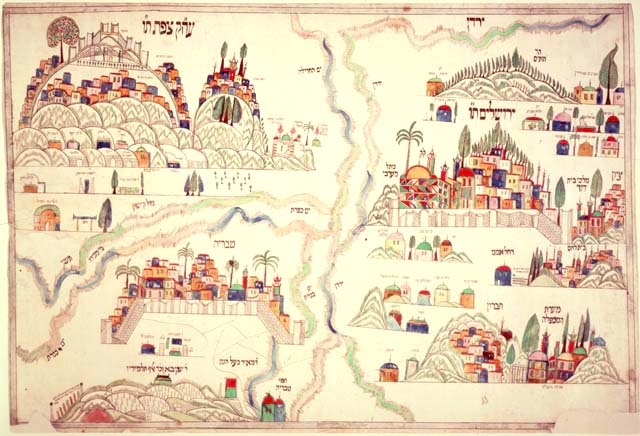
Out-of-scale map of the Four Holy Cities of Judaism in the 19th century: Jerusalem at the top right, Hebron beneath it, the Jordan River running top to bottom, Safed at the top left, and Tiberias beneath it.

In Judaism, the "Four Holy Cities" are Jerusalem, Hebron, Tiberias, and Safed. The concept was created for the purpose of fundraising within the Jewish diaspora, originating in the 1640s when the Jewish communities of Jerusalem, Hebron and Safed formed an association for that purpose – Tiberias was to join approximately a century later.

According to The Jewish Encyclopedia in 1906: "Since the sixteenth century the Holiness of Palestine, especially for burial, has been almost wholly transferred to four cities—Jerusalem, Hebron, Tiberias, and Safed."

== List of the cities and significance ==
=== Jerusalem ===
Jerusalem has had the highest significance for Jews since the 11th century BCE, when, according to the biblical narrative, David led the Israelites to conquer it from the Jebusites and established it as the capital city of the Kingdom of Israel and Judah. There, his son and successor Solomon constructed the Temple in Jerusalem, which held the Ark of the Covenant after the Holy of Holies of the Tabernacle. Though the First Temple and the Second Temple were both destroyed in antiquity, the Temple Mount, on which they stood, continues to serve as the basis of Jewish spirituality both inside and outside of the Land of Israel.

=== Hebron ===
Hebron, which is home to the Cave of the Patriarchs, is the burial place of the Hebrew patriarchs and their wives: Abraham and his wife Sarah; Abraham's son Isaac and his wife Rebecca; and Isaac's son Jacob and his wife Leah. As such, Hebron's significance for Jews is second only to Jerusalem, and it is also one of the four cities where Hebrew prophets (Abraham, in particular) purchased land: Abraham bought a field and a cave east of Hebron from the Hittites (Genesis 23:16–18); David bought a threshing floor at Jerusalem from Araunah the Jebusite (2 Samuel 24:24); Jacob bought land outside the walls of Shechem (Genesis 33:18–19); and Omri bought the site of Samaria. Further, Hebron was the first capital city of Israel and Judah during David's reign.

=== Tiberias ===
Tiberias is significant in Jewish history for several reasons. It was the place where the Jerusalem Talmud was composed and served as the final meeting place of the Great Sanhedrin, which was disbanded in 425 CE. The tomb of famous rabbis and other Jewish scholars, such as Yohanan ben Zakkai, Akiva, and Maimonides, are also located in the city. It was the home of the Masoretes and the place where the Tiberian vocalization for the Hebrew Bible was devised. According to Jewish tradition, the redemption will begin in Tiberias and the Sanhedrin will be reconstituted there, and the Messiah will arise from Lake Tiberias, enter the city, and be enthroned on the summit of a lofty hill in Safed.

=== Safed ===
Safed came to be regarded as a holy city at a significantly later time than the other three. The mass influx of Sephardic Jews following the Alhambra Decree, which was issued by the Catholic Monarchs of Spain during the Reconquista in 1492, enabled the transformation of Safed into a centre of Kabbalah and Jewish scholarship.

== See also ==
- History of the Jews and Judaism in the Land of Israel
  - List of Jewish leaders in the Land of Israel
- Laws and customs of the Land of Israel in Judaism
- List of Christian holy places in the Holy Land
