= Names of Jerusalem =

Names of Jerusalem refers to the multiple names by which the city of Jerusalem has been known and the etymology of the word in different languages. According to the Jewish Midrash, "Jerusalem has 70 names". Lists have been compiled of 72 different Hebrew names for Jerusalem in Jewish scripture.

Today, Jerusalem is called Yerushalayim (Hebrew: יְרוּשָׁלַיִם) and Al-Quds (Arabic: اَلْـقُـدْس). Yerushalayim is a derivation of a much older name, recorded as early as in the Middle Bronze Age, which has however been repeatedly re-interpreted in folk etymology, notably in Biblical Greek, where the first element of the name came to be associated with Greek: ἱερός (hieros, "holy"). The city is also known, especially among Muslims, as Bayt al-Maqdis (Arabic: بَـيْـت الْـمَـقْـدِس, lit. 'Holy House'), referring to the Temple in Jerusalem, called Beit HaMikdash in Hebrew.

== Early extra-biblical and biblical names ==
=== Jerusalem ===
F40 G43 M8 G1 G17 G17 N25
ꜣwšꜣmm
in hieroglyphs
Era: Middle Kingdom
(2055–1650 BC)

A city called Ꜣwšꜣmm in the Execration texts of the Middle Kingdom of Egypt (c. 19th century BCE) and typically reconstructed as (U)Rušalim is usually identified as Jerusalem. Nadav Na'aman proposed that the name should instead be understood as r'š (head) + rmm (exalted), meaning 'the exalted head', and so not referring to Jerusalem, but Na'aman withdrew this objection in 2023.

Jerusalem is called either Urusalim (URU ú-ru-sa-lim) or Urušalim (URU ú-ru-ša_{10}-lim) in the Amarna letters of Abdi-Heba (1330s BCE).

The Sumero-Akkadian name for Jerusalem, uru-salim, is variously etymologised to mean "foundation of [or: by] the god Shalim": from West Semitic yrw, ‘to found, to lay a cornerstone’, and Shalim, the Canaanite god of the setting sun and the nether world, as well as of health and perfection.

Jerusalem is the name most commonly used in the Bible, and the name used by most of the Western World. The Biblical Hebrew form is Yerushalaim (ירושלם), adopted in Biblical Greek as Hierousalēm, Ierousalēm (Ἰερουσαλήμ), or Hierosolyma, Ierosolyma (Ἱεροσόλυμα), and in early Christian Bibles as Syriac Ūrišlem (ܐܘܪܫܠܡ) as well as Latin Hierosolyma or Ierusalem. In Arabic, this name occurs in the form Ūrsālim (أْوْرْسَـالِـم) which is the Arabic name promoted by the Israeli government.

The name "Shalem", whether as a town or a deity, is derived from the same root Š-L-M as the word "shalom", meaning peace, so that the common interpretation of the name is now "The City of Peace" or "Abode of Peace", indicating a sanctuary.

The ending -ayim indicates the dual in Hebrew, thus leading to the suggestion that the name refers to the two hills on which the city sits. However, the pronunciation of the last syllable as -ayim appears to be a late development, which had not yet appeared at the time of the Septuagint. In fact, in the unvocalized Masoretic Text of the Hebrew Bible the yod that would be required for the -ayim ending (so that it would be written ירושלים, as in post-biblical Hebrew, rather than ירושלם) is almost always absent. It is only the much later vocalization, with the vowel marks for a and i squeezed together between the lamed and the mem, that provides the basis for this reading. In extra-biblical inscriptions, the earliest known example of the -ayim ending was discovered on a column about 3 km west of ancient Jerusalem, dated to the first century BCE.

In Genesis Rabbah 56:10, the name is interpreted as a combination of yir'eh, "He will see [to it]," and Shalem, the city of King Melchizedek (based on Genesis 14:18). A similar theory is offered by Philo in his discussion of the term "God's city." Other midrashim say that Jerusalem means "City of Peace".

In Greek, the city is called either Ierousalēm (Ἰερουσαλήμ) or Hierosolyma (Ἱεροσόλυμα). The latter exhibits yet another re-etymologization, by association with the word hieros (Greek: ἱερός, "holy"). In early Greek manuscripts, Ἱερουσαλήμ is presented as a "holy name": Ι̅Λ̅Η̅Μ̅.

=== In Jewish Tradition ===
In Jewish tradition, the notion that "Jerusalem has seventy names" is a widely cited midrashic concept originating in Bamidbar Rabbah. This number is not intended to be a literal or exhaustive linguistic tally, but rather a symbolic representation of the city’s multifaceted character and its central importance in Jewish consciousness; in Hebrew numerology (Gematria), seventy represents the "seventy nations of the world," suggesting that the city holds significance for all of humanity. Various medieval scholars and commentators have attempted to compile these lists, drawing primarily from poetic epithets found throughout the Tanakh (Hebrew Bible), particularly in the books of Isaiah, Psalms, and Lamentations. These names range from descriptions of its physical beauty, such as Klilat Yofi ("Perfection of Beauty"), to its spiritual function, like Ir Ha-Emet ("City of Truth"). The sheer variety of names, representing the city in states of both desolation and former glory, reflects the emotional depth and historical layers attributed to the city in Jewish thought.

=== Shalem ===
The name Shalem/Salem (שלם šālêm) is found in the account of Melchizedek in Genesis 14:18: And Melchizedek king of Salem brought forth bread and wine: and he was the priest of the most high God (El Elyon).

That the name Salem refers to Jerusalem is evidenced by Psalm 76:2 which uses "Salem" as a parallel for "Zion", the citadel of Jerusalem. The same identification is made by Josephus and the Aramaic translations of the Bible.

Language	Name	Translit.
Greek (LXX)	Σαλήμ	Salēm
Greek (variant)	Σόλυμα	Solyma
Biblical Latin	Salem	
Arabic	سَـالِـم	Sālim
Hebrew	שָׁלֵם	Šālēm

Shalem was the Canaanite god of dusk, sunset, and the end of the day, also spelled Shalim. Many scholars believe that his name is preserved in the name of the city Jerusalem. It is believed by some scholars that the name of Jerusalem comes from Uru + Shalem, meaning the foundation of Shalem or founded by Shalem or city of Shalem, and that Shalem was the city god of the place before El Elyon.

=== Zion ===
Mount Zion (Hebrew: הר צִיּוֹן Har Tsiyyon) was originally the name of the hill where the Jebusite fortress stood, but the name was later applied to the Temple Mount just to the north of the fortress, also known as Mount Moriah, possibly also referred to as "Daughter of Zion" (i.e., as a protrusion of Mount Zion proper).

From the Second Temple era, the name came to be applied to a hill just to the south-west of the walled city. This latter hill is still known as Mount Zion today. From the point of view of the Babylonian exile (6th century BCE), Zion has come to be used as a synonym of the city of Jerusalem as a whole.

=== Other biblical names ===
- Mount Moriah (now usually identified with the Temple Mount) was a part of Jebus (Judges 19:10), a city inhabited by the Jebusites. According to the Bible, this land was sold to King David by Ornan the Jebusite for six hundred shekels of gold (1Chr 21:26) in order to build in the threshing floor an altar for sacrifice to stop the plague God had sent upon Israel. Solomon later built the Temple there. The Jebusite stronghold at that time was called Zion which David took by force, and it afterward began to be called The City of David. (2 Sam 5:7–10)
  - Biblical Hebrew מוריה
  - Biblical Greek Μώριας Mōrias
  - Biblical Latin Moria
  - Arabic مُـرِيَّـا (Muriyyā) or مُـرَيَّـا (Murayyā) (?)
  - Hebrew מוֹרִיָּה Môriyyāh
- City of David: The City of David (Hebrew Ir David עיר דוד Tiberian Hebrew עִיר דָּוִד ʿîr Dāwiḏ) is the biblical term for the Iron Age walled fortress; now the name of the corresponding archaeological site just south of the Temple Mount
- Jebus (Jebusite city) in Judges 19:10
- The Lord sees, Hebrew Adonai-jireh, in Vulgate Latin Dominus videt. In the opinion of some Rabbinic commentators, the combination of Yir'eh (יראה) with Shalem (שלם) is the origin of the name Jerusalem (ירושלם).
- Oasis of Justice, Hebrew Neveh Tzedek (נווה צדק), Tiberian Hebrew נְוֵה-צֶדֶק Nəwēh Ṣeḏeq (Jeremiah 31:23).
- Ariel (אֲרִיאֵל) in Isaiah 29:1–8
- City of the Holy Place/Holiness, Hebrew Ir Ha-Kodesh / Ir Ha-Kedosha, (עיר הקודש) in Isa 48:42, Isa 51:1, Dan 9:24 Neh 11:1 and Neh 11:18.
- City of the Great King
  - Hebrew: kiryat melekh rav (קרית מלך רב) as in Psalm 48:2.
  - Koine Greek: polis megalou basileos (πόλις μεγάλου βασιλέως) as in Matthew 5:35.
  - Tiberian Hebrew קִרְיַת מֶלֶךְ רָב Qiryaṯ Meleḵ Rāḇ

== Middle Persian ==
According to "Shahnameh", ancient Iranian used "Kangdezh Hûkht" کَـنْـگ دِژ هُـوْخْـت or "Dezhkang Hûkht" دِژ کَـنْـگ هُـوْخْـت to name Jerusalem. "Kang Diz Huxt" means "holy palace" and was the capital of "Zahhak" and also "Fereydun's" kingdom. Another variant of the name is Kang-e Dozhhûkht (Dozhhûkht-Kang), which is attested in Shahnameh. It means "[the] accursed Kang".

== Greco-Roman ==
Aelia Capitolina was the Roman name given to Jerusalem in the 2nd century, after the destruction of the Second Temple. The name refers to Hadrian's family, the gens Aelia, and to the hill temple of Jupiter built on the remains of the Temple. During the later Roman Era, the city was expanded to the area now known as the Old City of Jerusalem. Population increased during this period, peaking at several hundred thousand, numbers only reached again in the modern city, in the 1960s.

From this name derives Tiberian Hebrew אֵילִיָּה קַפִּיטוֹלִינָה ʼÊliyyāh Qappîṭôlînāh. The Roman name was loaned as Arabic: إِيْـلْـيَـاء, romanized: ʼĪlyāʼ, early in the Middle Ages, and appears in some Hadith (Bukhari 1:6, 4:191; Muwatta 20:26), like Bayt ul-Maqdis.

== Islamic ==
Jerusalem fell to the Muslim conquest of Palestine in 638. The medieval city corresponded to what is now known as the Old City (rebuilt in the 2nd century as Roman Aelia Capitolina).

The modern Arabic name of Jerusalem is اَلْـقُـدْس al-Quds, and its first recorded use can be traced to the 9th century CE, two hundred years after the Muslim conquest of the city. Prior to the use of this name, the names used for Jerusalem were إِيْـلْـيَـاء Īlyā' (from the Roman era name) and بَـيْـت الْـمَـقْـدِس Bayt al-Maqdis (after the Temple), alternatively vocalized as بَـيْـت الْـمُـقَـدَّس Bayt al-Muqaddas.

Al-Quds is the most common Arabic name for Jerusalem and is used by many cultures influenced by Islam. The name may have been shortened from مَـدِيـنَـة الْـقُـدْس Madīnat al-Quds, a calque of the Hebrew name for the city, Ir HaKodesh (עיר הקודש "the Holy City" or "City of the Holy Place"). The variant اَلْـقُـدْس الـشَّـرِيْـف al-Quds aš-Šarīf ("Al-Quds the Noble") has also been used, notably by the Ottomans in the Turkish form Kudüs-i Şerîf.

- Albanian – Jeruzalemi or Kudus
- Azerbaijani – Yerusəlim, Qüds, or Qüdsi-Şərif
- Indonesian – Alkudsi or Al-Quds
- Kazakh – әл-Құдыс (äl-Qudıs)
- Kurdish – قودس/Quds or ئۆرشەلیم/ Orşelîm
- Malay – Al-Quds
- Dhivehi (Maldivian) – ގުދުސް, Quds
- Persian – قدس, Qods
- Swahili – Kudisi or Yerusalemu
- Standard Hebrew – הַקֹּדֶשׁ, HaKodesh
- Tiberian Hebrew – הַקֹּדֶשׁ, HaQodhesh lit. "The Holy"
- Turkish – Kudüs or Yeruşalim
- Urdu – قدس, Quds, قدس شریف, Quds Śarīf or یروشلم, Yaroślam
- Uzbek – Quddus

Bayt al-Maqdis or Bayt al-Muqaddas is a less commonly used Arabic name for Jerusalem though it appeared more commonly in early Islamic sources. It is the base from which nisbas (names based on the origin of the person named) are formed – hence the famous medieval geographer called both al-Maqdisi and al-Muqaddasi (b. 946) This name is of a semantic extension from the Hadiths used in reference to the Temple in Jerusalem, called Beit HaMikdash (בית המקדש "The Holy Temple" or "Temple of the Sanctified Place") in Hebrew.

- Avar – Байтул Макъдис, Baytul Maqdis
- Azerbaijani – Beytül-Müqəddəs
- Indonesian – Baitulmaqdis
- Kurdish – بەیتی موقەددەس/ Beytî Muqeddes
- Malay – Baitulmuqaddis
- Persian – بيت مقدس, Beit-e Moghaddas
- Turkish Beyt-i Mukaddes
- Urdu – بيت المقدس, Bait-ul-Muqaddas

Arabic: اَلْـبَـلَاط al-Balāṭ is a rare poetic name for Jerusalem in Arabic, loaned from the Latin palatium "palace".

Ṣahyūn (Arabic: صهيون, Ṣahyūn or Ṣihyūn) is the word for Zion in Arabic and Syriac. Drawing on biblical tradition, it is one of the names accorded to Jerusalem in Arabic and Islamic tradition.

== Sign languages ==
Jewish and Arab signers of Israeli Sign Language use different signs: the former mimic kissing the Western Wall, the latter gesture to indicate the shape of the Masjid Al-Aqsa (i.e. the Dome of the Rock).

== See also ==
- Names of the Levant
- Shaam
- Timeline of the name "Palestine"
