= Araunah =

Biblical character

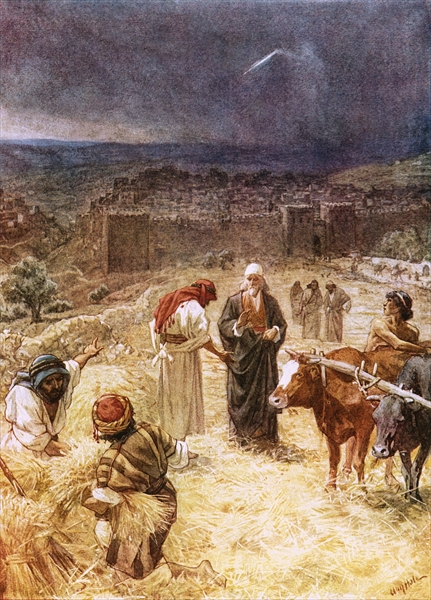
King David purchasing the threshing floor of Araunah the Jebusite (19th/20th century)

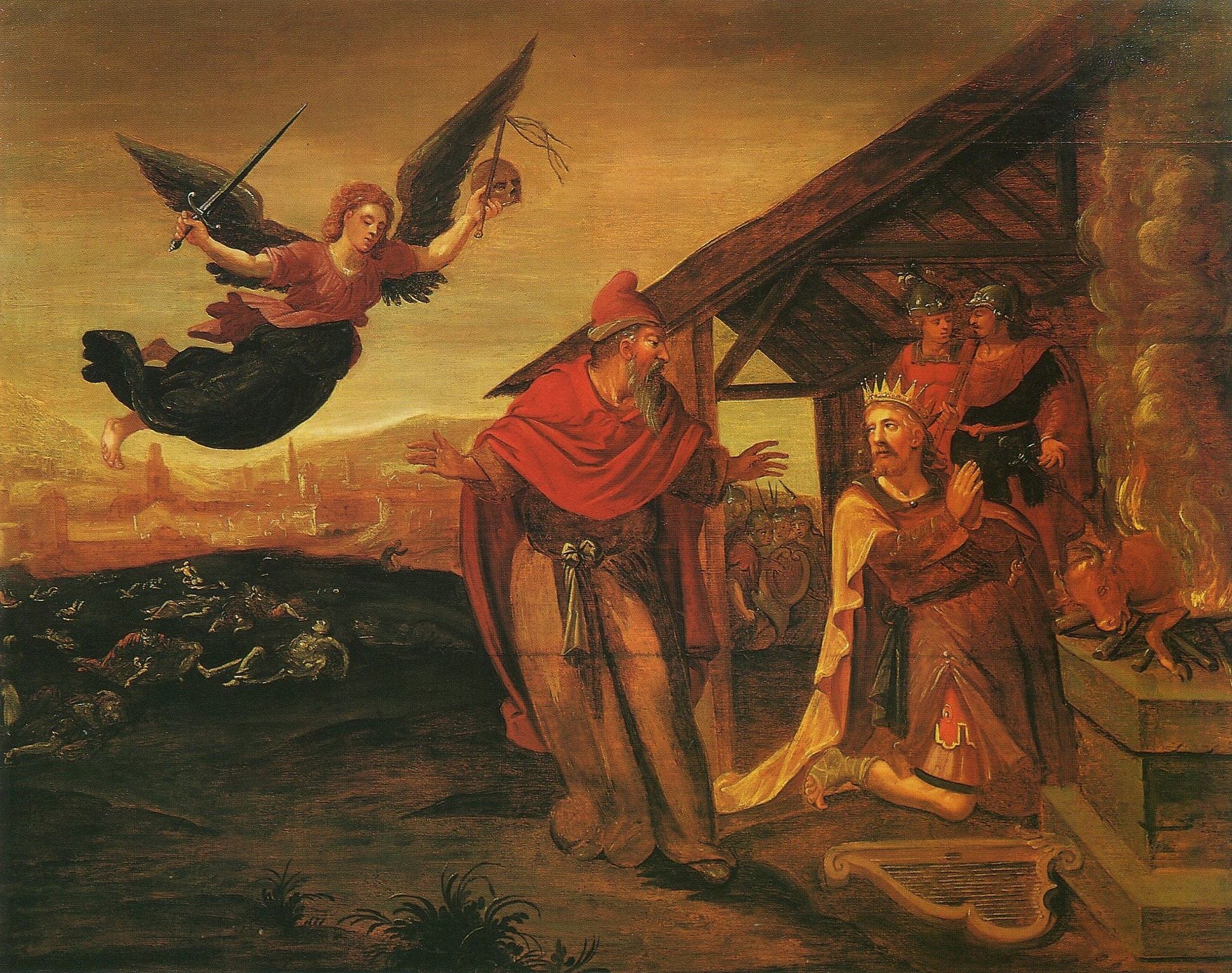
David and Araunah making offerings at the altar (circle of Lambert Jacobsz, 17th century)

Araunah (Hebrew: אֲרַוְנָה ʾǍrawnā) was a Jebusite mentioned in the Second Book of Samuel, who owned the threshing floor on Mount Moriah which David purchased and used as the site for assembling an altar to God. The First Book of Chronicles, a later text, renders his name as Ornan (אָרְנָן ʾOrnān).

== Biblical narrative ==
The narrative concerning Araunah appears in both 2 Samuel 24 and 1 Chronicles 21. The Samuel version is the final member of a group of narratives which together constitute the "appendix" (2 Samuel 21–24) of the Books of Samuel, which do not fit into the chronological ordering of the rest of Samuel. In the Samuel narrative, Yahweh was angry again both with the Israelites and David, King of Israel, who imposed a census on the Israelites, an order Joab reluctantly carried out. According to the version of the narrative presented in the Books of Chronicles, it was Satan who incited David to take the census. Yahweh regarded David's action as a sin, and so punished him, sending Gad the prophet to offer David a choice between three punishments:

- Seven years of famine (which counts the 4 years of famine that already happened before the census was completed per 2 Samuel 21:1), or (put more symmetrically) 3 more years of famine, as in 1 Chronicles 21:12 and in the Septuagint translation of 2 Samuel;
- Three months of fleeing from an invader;
- Three days of plague from the Angel of the Lord.

David indicated that instead of falling into the hands of men, he would rather fall into the hands of God's mercy and discretion. An angel was sent to spread a plague. However, when the angel reached Jerusalem, God ordered the angel to stop; at this point, the angel was at Araunah's threshing floor, which David noticed. God instructed David to build an altar there, so David purchased the location from Araunah for a fair price, even though Araunah offered it to him freely. According to 2 Samuel 24:24, David paid fifty silver shekels for the threshing floor and the oxen; 1 Chronicles 21:25 states that David paid 600 gold shekels for the entire site where the threshing floor was located. Biblical scholar Hans-Peter Mathys noted:

[This incident] is modelled on Abraham's purchase of Machpelah's cave (Genesis 23), even repeating specific details, the most important of which is David's insistence on paying the full price (an expression used only in Genesis 23:9 and 1 Chronicles 21:22, 24). The 600 gold (sic) shekels David pays is more than Abraham's 400 silver shekels [paid] for Machpelah's cave.

== Census ==
In the Books of Samuel, the census is said to indicate that there were 1,300,000 men fit for military service. The Book of Chronicles states that the figure was 1,570,000 men fit for military service.

Joab's reluctance to complete the census is thought by some scholars to have been due to a religious belief that the people belonged to God, and hence that only God should know how many there were. Some scholars believe the motive for the census was pride, that David's numbering of the people was to show his strength as a king; his sin in this was relying on human numbers instead of God. Other scholars believe that a more mundane motive is the reason – that the knowledge gained from a census would enable David to impose more accurate taxes and levies, and thus the census would be unpopular with the people who were at risk of higher taxes or levies.

== Identity of Araunah ==
The Bible identified Araunah as a Jebusite. Some biblical scholars believe that he may have been the local king at the time. The word araunah is not a personal name, but a title meaning "the lord" in Hurrian, which was borrowed into several languages of the ancient Near East.
