= 2 Samuel 24 =

Second Book of Samuel chapter

- ← chapter 23 1 Kings 1 →
- The pages containing the Books of Samuel (1 & 2 Samuel) Leningrad Codex (1008 CE).
- Book: First book of Samuel
- Hebrew Bible part: Nevi'im
- Order in the Hebrew part: 3
- Category: Former Prophets
- Christian Bible part: Old Testament
- Order in the Christian part: 10

2 Samuel 24 is the twenty-fourth (and the final) chapter of the Second Book of Samuel in the Old Testament of the Christian Bible or the second part of Books of Samuel in the Hebrew Bible. According to Jewish tradition the book was attributed to the prophet Samuel, with additions by the prophets Gad and Nathan, but modern scholars view it as a composition of a number of independent texts of various ages from c. 630–540 BCE. This chapter contains the account of David's reign in Jerusalem. This is within a section comprising 2 Samuel 21–24 containing the appendices to the Books of Samuel.

== Text ==
This chapter was originally written in the Hebrew language. It is divided into 25 verses.

=== Textual witnesses ===
Some early manuscripts containing the text of this chapter in Hebrew are of the Masoretic Text tradition, which includes the Codex Cairensis (895), Aleppo Codex (10th century), and Codex Leningradensis (1008). Fragments containing parts of this chapter in Hebrew were found among the Dead Sea Scrolls including 4Q51 (4QSam^{a}; 100–50 BCE) with extant verses 16–22.

Extant ancient manuscripts of a translation into Koine Greek known as the Septuagint (originally was made in the last few centuries BCE) include Codex Vaticanus (B; $\mathfrak{G}$^{B}; 4th century) and Codex Alexandrinus (A; $\mathfrak{G}$^{A}; 5th century). (Note: The whole book of 2 Samuel is missing from the extant Codex Sinaiticus.)

=== Old Testament references ===
- 2 Samuel 24:1–9: Exodus 30:11–16; 1 Chronicles 21:1–6
- 2 Samuel 24:10–25: 1 Chronicles 21:7–30

== Analysis ==
The miscellaneous collection of narratives, lists, and poems in 2 Samuel 21–24 are appendices to the Books of Samuel, arranged not chronologically, but carefully crafted into a concentric three-tiered structure as follows:

A. National crisis (21:1-14) – David's penultimate public act

B. Lists of David's warriors and accounts of heroic deeds (21:15–22) – David's decline and his exit from military affairs

C. Poem (22:1–51) – A penultimate testament: David sings a song
C'. Poem (23:1–7) – David's ultimate testament

B'. Lists of David's warriors and accounts of heroic deeds (23:8–39) – David's decline and his exit from military affairs

A'. National crisis (24:1–25) – David's final public act

These chapters center on two poems: the Psalm of David in 22:2–51, a review of the mighty acts of God, and the oracle in 23:1–7, an assurance that the Davidic dynasty was to endure, with the focal point of the incipit to David's second poem (23:1): "These are the last words of David" as a notice that the 'David Narrative' is drawing to a close. Directly framing the central poems are the warrior exploits in 21:15–22 and again in 23:8–39 (accompanied by a warrior list) and bracketing in the outer circle are a famine story (21:1–14) and a plague story (24:11–25), both were caused by divine anger in response to a transgression by a king (Saul and David, respectively). The episode related to the Gibeonites in 21:1–14 links to the relationship between David and the house of Saul in the preceding chapter. The final section containing the plague story in 2 Samuel 24 links to the building of Solomon's temple, so appropriately placed right before 1 Kings. After these episodes the next story is King Solomon's succession, so then King David can die (1 Kings 1–2).

This chapter has the following structure:

A. The Lord's anger (24:1)

B. David's order, Joab's obedience (24:2–9)

C. David acknowledges his sin (24:10)

D. The penalty (24:11–13)

E. David's choice (24:14)

D'. The penalty exacted (24:15–16)

C'. David acknowledges his sin (24:17)

B'. Gad's order, David's obedience (24:18–25a)

A'. The Lord's anger is appeased (24:25b)

The center of this chapter is David's choice of his punishment as he left it to God's mercy. This is bracketed by the punishment choices and the punishment exacted (D/D' sections). The C/C' sections contain David's double confession. David's order and Joab's obedience (B section) parallels Gad's order and David's obedience (B' section). The inclusion (A/A' sections) is God's anger that raged at the beginning and was appeased at the end.

== David’s military census (24:1–9) ==
Verse 1 suggests that David's census was incited so that God could punish Israel for a sin committed previously—from a theological perspective, whereas the Chronicler states that it was Satan who incited David to count the people (1 Chronicles 21:1) from a human perspective. Joab possibly sensed the danger of moving from 'a charismatic levy to a human organization' (verse 3) as there was a 'religious taboo' on counting people (cf. Exodus 30:11–16). The reference to those 'able to draw the sword' (verse 9, cf. Numbers 1:2–3) indicates an enrollment for military service, which may neglect rules of purity (cf. Joshua 3:5; Deuteronomy 23:9–14).

=== Verse 1 ===
And again the anger of the Lord was kindled against Israel, and he moved David against them to say, Go, number Israel and Judah.

- "Number": "take a census of"

== Judgment for David’s sin (24:10–17) ==
After David realized that he sinned against God, he was given choice through the prophet Gad (verse 11–14) between three possible punishments, varying in length of time from three years to three days, but on a reverse scale of intensity. David left the choice to God's mercy, which came down to pestillence (verse 15).

== David built an altar (24:18–25) ==
This last section contains David's purchase of Araunah's threshing-floor which is an aetiological narrative explaining what would become the site of Solomon's temple (cf. the pillar at Bethel, Genesis 28:11-22, and the altar at Ophrah, Judges 6:11-24). Traditionally a threshing-floor could be a site of theophany (Judges 6:37) and a place for receiving divine messages (2 Kings 22:10) as extrabiblically also the case at Ugarit, but the text does not claim that Araunah's threshing-floor was originally a Jebusite sanctuary. It was the appearance of an angel (verse 16) and the erection of an altar (verses 18, 25) that made it a sanctuary. David's conversation with Araunah for purchasing the place recalls Abraham's conversation with the Hittites for the purchase of the cave of Machpelah (Genesis 23). In both cases the offer of a gift was rejected and a formal purchase was made (1 Chronicles 21:24 states explicitly that a gift from a non-Israelite could not be accepted for a site of the Jerusalem temple). David's response to God's words led to the erection of an altar offering pleasing sacrifice to God, which averted the plague (verse 25). The accounts in this chapter at the end of the Books of Samuel, ending with the erection of a holocaust altar on Araunah's threshing-floor, was to be continued in the next book (Books of Kings) with the accounts of the building of Solomon's temple.

=== Verse 24 ===
Then the king said to Araunah, "No, but I will surely buy it from you for a price; nor will I offer burnt offerings to the LORD my God with that which costs me nothing."
So David bought the threshing floor and the oxen for fifty shekels of silver.

- "Fifty shekels of silver": this was to purchase for the thresing-floor, oxen and wood instruments only, whereas the large sum "six hundred shekels of gold by weight" (1 Chronicles 21:25) was paid later for the whole hill, on which David prepared for the temple to be built by Solomon.

== See also ==
- Angel of the Lord
- Aroer
- Beersheba
- Canaanites
- Dan
- Gilead
- Hivites
- Israelites
- Jazer
- Jebusite
- Jerusalem
- Jordan River
- Kingdom of Israel
- Korban
- Paganism
- Righteousness
- Shekel
- Sidon
- Tyre
- Related Bible parts: 1 Chronicles 21

== Sources ==
=== Commentaries on Samuel ===
- Auld, Graeme (2003). "1 & 2 Samuel". In James D. G. Dunn and John William Rogerson (ed.). Eerdmans Commentary on the Bible. Eerdmans. ISBN 9780802837110.
- Bergen, David T. (1996). 1, 2 Samuel. B&H Publishing Group. ISBN 9780805401073.
- Chapman, Stephen B. (2016). 1 Samuel as Christian Scripture: A Theological Commentary. Wm. B. Eerdmans Publishing Company. ISBN 978-1467445160.
- Collins, John J. (2014). "Chapter 14: 1 Samuel 12 – 2 Samuel 25". Introduction to the Hebrew Scriptures. Fortress Press. pp. 277–296. ISBN 978-1451469233.
- Evans, Paul (2018). Longman, Tremper (ed.). 1-2 Samuel. The Story of God Bible Commentary. Zondervan Academic. ISBN 978-0310490944.
- Gordon, Robert (1986). I & II Samuel, A Commentary. Paternoster Press. ISBN 9780310230229.
- Hertzberg, Hans Wilhelm (1964). I & II Samuel, A Commentary (trans. from German 2nd edition 1960 ed.). Westminster John Knox Press. p. 19. ISBN 978-0664223182.
- Morrison, Craig E. (2013). Berit Olam: 2 Samuel. Liturgical Press. ISBN 978-0814682913.
- Steinmann, Andrew (2017). 2 Samuel. Concordia Commentary: a theological exposition of sacred scripture. Concordia Publishing House. ISBN 9780758650061.

=== General ===
- Breytenbach, Andries (2000). "Who Is Behind The Samuel Narrative?". In Johannes Cornelis de Moor and H.F. Van Rooy (ed.). Past, Present, Future: the Deuteronomistic History and the Prophets. Brill. ISBN 9789004118713.
- Coogan, Michael David (2007). Coogan, Michael David; Brettler, Marc Zvi; Newsom, Carol Ann; Perkins, Pheme (eds.). The New Oxford Annotated Bible with the Apocryphal/Deuterocanonical Books: New Revised Standard Version, Issue 48 (Augmented 3rd ed.). Oxford University Press. ISBN 978-0195288810.
- Fitzmyer, Joseph A. (2008). A Guide to the Dead Sea Scrolls and Related Literature. Grand Rapids, MI: William B. Eerdmans Publishing Company. ISBN 9780802862419.
- Halley, Henry H. (1965). Halley's Bible Handbook: an abbreviated Bible commentary (24th (revised) ed.). Zondervan Publishing House. ISBN 0-310-25720-4.
- Hayes, Christine (2015). Introduction to the Bible. Yale University Press. ISBN 978-0300188271.
- Jones, Gwilym H. (2007). "12. 1 and 2 Samuel". In Barton, John; Muddiman, John (eds.). The Oxford Bible Commentary (first (paperback) ed.). Oxford University Press. pp. 196–232. ISBN 978-0199277186.
- Klein, R.W. (2003). "Samuel, books of". In Bromiley, Geoffrey W (ed.). The International Standard Bible Encyclopedia. Eerdmans. ISBN 9780802837844.
- Knight, Douglas A (1995). "Chapter 4 Deuteronomy and the Deuteronomists". In James Luther Mays, David L. Petersen and Kent Harold Richards (ed.). Old Testament Interpretation. T&T Clark. ISBN 9780567292896.
- McKane, William (1993). "Samuel, Book of". In Metzger, Bruce M; Coogan, Michael D (eds.). The Oxford Companion to the Bible. Oxford University Press. pp. 409–413. ISBN 978-0195046458.
- Ulrich, Eugene, ed. (2010). The Biblical Qumran Scrolls: Transcriptions and Textual Variants. Brill.
- Würthwein, Ernst (1995). The Text of the Old Testament. Translated by Rhodes, Erroll F. Grand Rapids, MI: Wm. B. Eerdmans. ISBN 0-8028-0788-7.
