= Moshe Shem Tov =

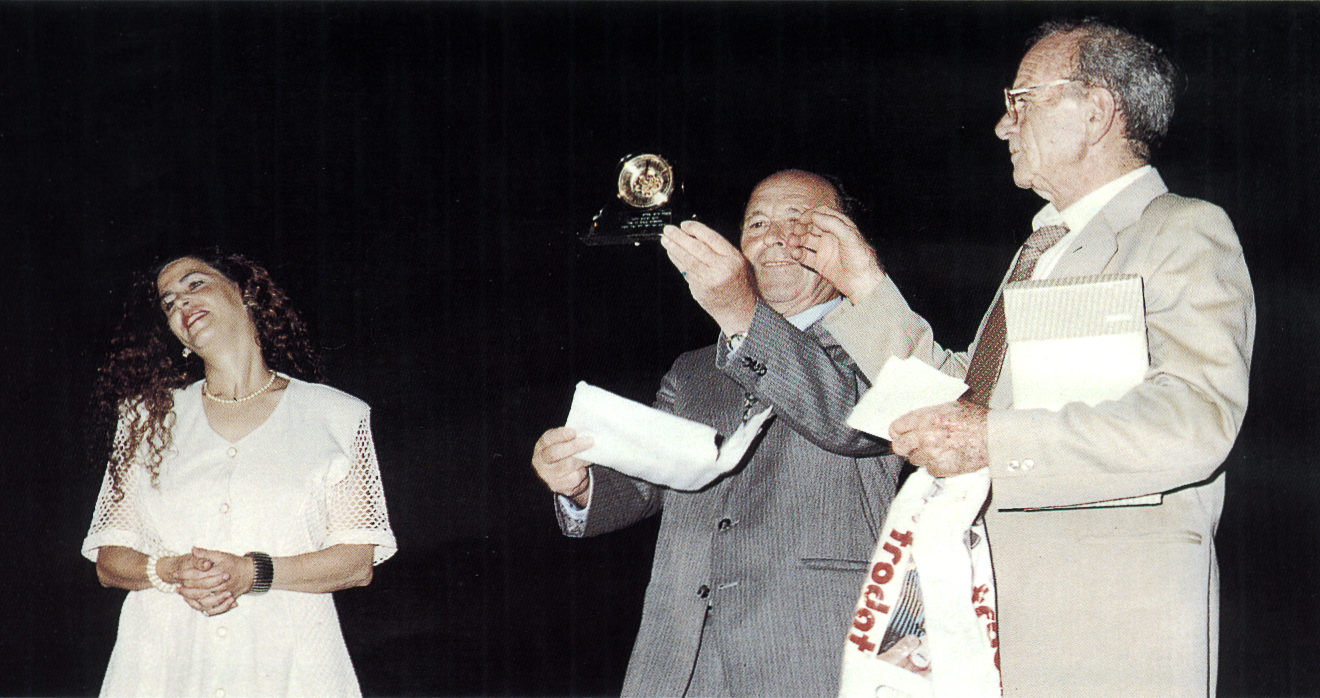
Moshe Shem Tov on the right, Tel Aviv, 1994.

Moshe Shem Tov (Hebrew: משה שם טוב; April 30, 1924 – December 25, 2005) was the chairman of the Central Committee ("the Center") of The Association of the Deaf in Israel (Acha) from 1972 to 1989. Shem Tov was the first chairman of the Acha, who approved the conducting of the leadership courses for young Deaf people without experience, and trained them in collaboration with the Ministry of Labor and Social Welfare in Israel and the Hanns Seidel Foundation, to be the next generation of the leaders in Acha.

Shem Tov was born in Bulgaria and immigrated to Israel on July 31, 1948, when he was 24. His deafness did not prevent him from acquiring the Hebrew language, joining the Deaf community in Israel, marrying his wife, and bring two hearing kids.

Shem Tov lived in Bat Yam, and worked with his brother in Jaffa in an industry of shutters and windows installation. After his retirement from the Acha leadership, Deaf people continued to reach his workplace, and he helped them willingly, even though these were his working hours.

== Shem Tov and the Deaf Community ==
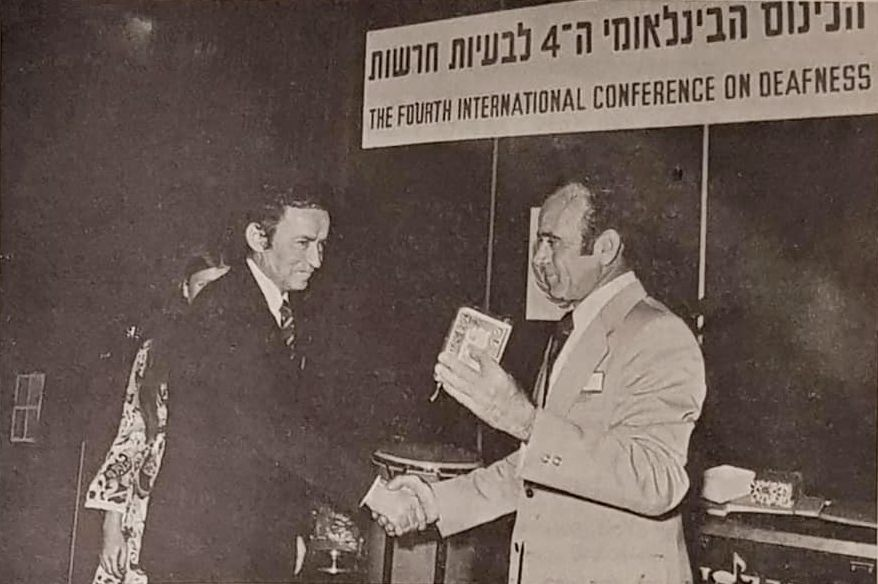
Moshe Shem Tov welcomes Dr. Dragoljub Vukotić, the president of the World Federation of the Deaf, and gives him a tribute at the Fourth International Conference on Deafness in Bat Yam, 1973.

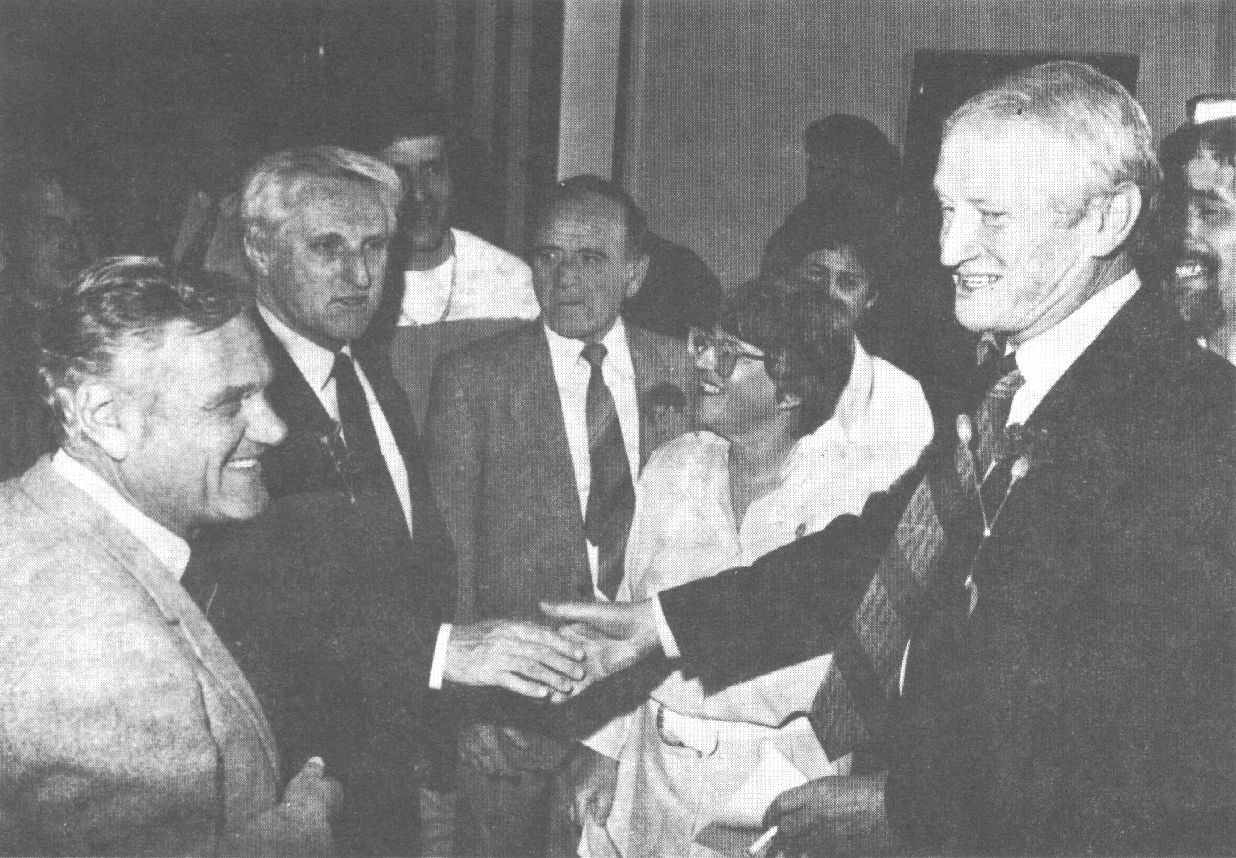
The inauguration ceremony of the Helen Keller House, renovated in Tel Aviv in 1987, after funding for renovations by the philanthropist Leon Moe. Left to right: Chaim Apter, former chairman of Acha and secretary of the World Organization of Jewish Deaf; Mayor of Tel Aviv, Shlomo Lahat; Moshe Shem Tov; Chava Savir CEO of Acha; Leon Moo; Yehuda Zino, director of the Helen Keller House in Tel Aviv.

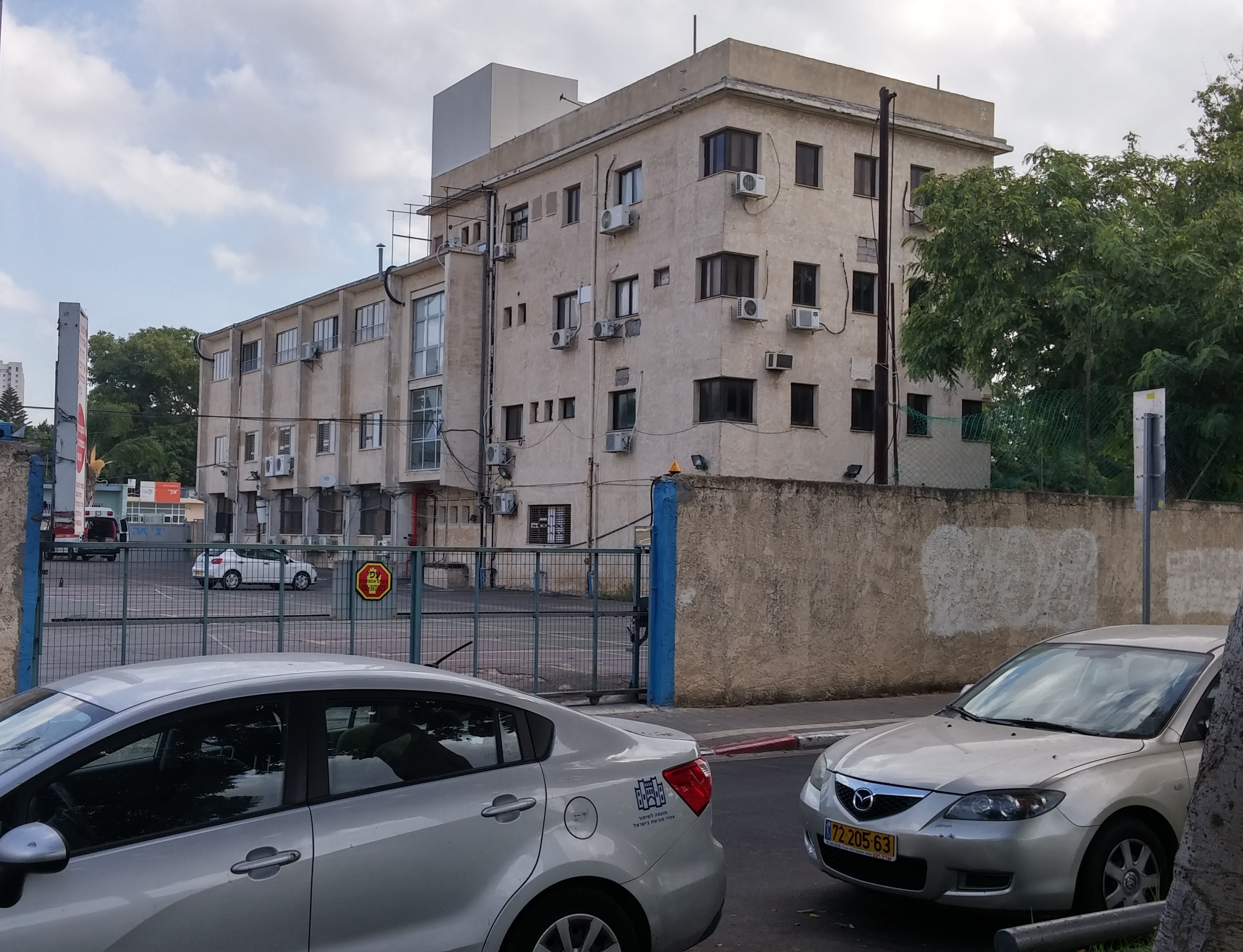
Helen Keller House in Tel Aviv, 2016. On the right: First floor: Tel Aviv branch; Second floor: The Center; Third floor: Asach. On the left: The main hall, for lectures, parties and for the General Meetings.

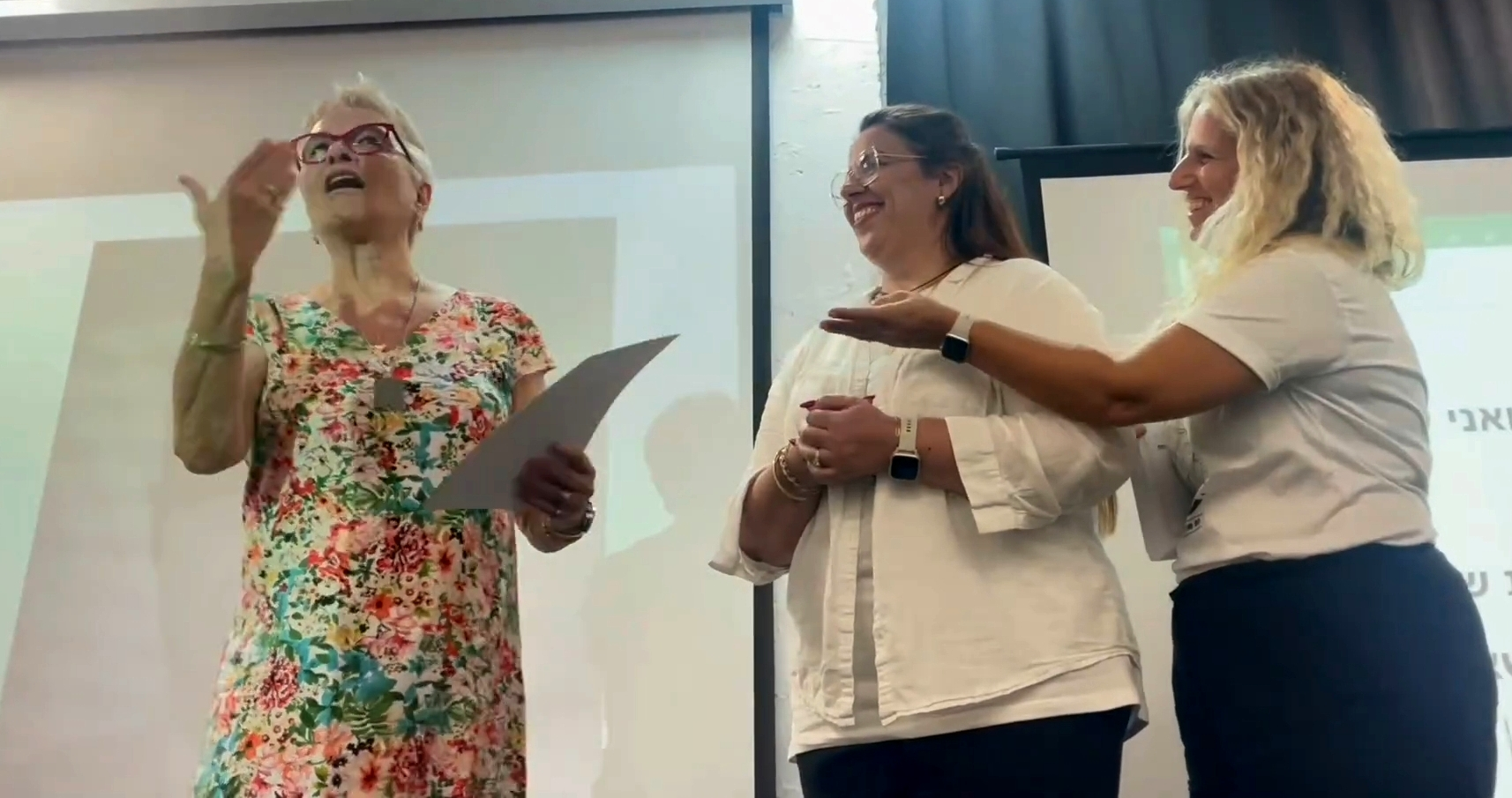
Eti Schwerzberg (in the middle), chairwoman of Acha, and Mirit Eliyahu (right), an Acha board member, grant a certificate of appreciation for Moshe Shem Tov to Ofra (left), his daughter, Helen Keller house, July 2024.

When Shem Tov was the chairman of Acha, the media options were quite limited. There were no closed captions on the television in Israel, which ran a single channel. Fax and internet were not existing, and the documents were written by a typewriter. The lack of communication options did not delay Shem Tov from being in a continuous communication with the World Organization of Jewish Deaf, and he also represented Acha as a member of the World Federation of the Deaf.

Shem Tov had the ability to talk with everyone who was Deaf, hard of hearing or hearing. His personal skill was the ability to communicate theatrically and with a sense of humor even with total strangers.

During March 19–23, 1973, the Pan American Hotel in Bat Yam held the Fourth International Conference on Deafness Problems, which was organized by Acha under the sponsorship of the World Federation of the Deaf. The mayor of Bat-Yam, Menachem Rothschild, attended its opening ceremony. At the conference, Shem Tov gave a gift to Dr. Dragolijub Vukotic, the president of the World Federation who attended the conference as well.

The Center of Acha operated and worked in the Helen Keller House in Tel Aviv, alongside the Tel Aviv branch of Acha, and Shem Tov knew a lot of Acha members, because he was chosen by them every year as a delegate of Tel Aviv branch in democratic elections, and as Acha chairman in the General Meetings of Acha, which were made by the Israeli law of voluntary associations. Shem Tov knew also the Algerian Jewish Sign Language, because there were Deaf people from Algeria in the Tel Aviv branch. In the Helen Keller House there were also the Israel Deaf Sports Organization (Asach) and a dormitory for Deaf pupils. The director of the dormitory was employed by Acha, and Shem Tov knew also the Deaf people from their juvenility. In 1985, during a reorganization of the Helen Keller House, by a request of the Tel Aviv branch, the upper dormitory floor was moved to Asach, which previously made its activity in a small room on the ground floor of the Helen Keller House, next to the dormitory dining room, and the dormitory was moved to Onim.

The delegates of the General Meeting were elected as a delegate per a number of paying members in the branch. A larger number of branch members resulted more delegates, which were elected in secret and equal elections under the supervision of the Acha Audit Committee. The largest branch in Israel was the Tel Aviv branch, where deaf people from Gush Dan were registered. The second branch was the Haifa branch, where Deaf people from Acre and the Krayot were registered. From Ashkelon, Ashdod, Beersheba, Jerusalem and Netanya, there were usually two delegates from each branch. The General Meeting elected a Presidential Committee for the Management of the Meeting, received a summary report for the past year from the Chairman of the Acha, and reviews from the Acha treasurer and the Audit Committee, raised issues on which the chairman responded, approved the annual balance, and elected the chairperson of Acha for the next term. When the chairman was elected, he elected the members of the Center for leading Acha with him. Shem Tov had a liberal approach to the members of the Center, and gave them space in making decisions, while making regular meetings in which the members of the Center presented all their activities and received feedback and control of their actions from all the participants in the meeting. A similar approach was made by Shem Tov with the chairpersons of the branches, and he narrowly intervened in the activities which were carried out at the Acha branches. Once a year, he used to invite the chairpersons of the branches to a meeting in the Center, for getting their assistance with the national fundraising day for the Deaf. The chairpersons of the branches saw these meetings as a chance to improve the conditions in their branches, which some of them were in a bad physical condition, like the Jerusalem branch, which in 2003 received a new place on Ben Yehuda street in Jerusalem, after a decade it had no building and was operated in rented places like Magen David Adom building at Romema.

Alongside his liberalism and his openness to the Deaf, Shem Tov inspected the Acha staff, which most of them were hearing, and replaced CEOs when it was needed. Shem Tov also retained the interests of Acha with government offices and in front of the similar Non-governmental organizations which operated in front to Acha. An Organization whose name was Shema operated clubs for Deaf and hard of hearing pupils, and demanded from the Ministry of Education a part of the annual Fundraising, which was established by Shem Tov. After the Ministry of Education had confirmed the participation of Shema and Micha in revenues of the fundraising, Shem Tov initiated an idea to establish the Association of Youth Silence, a nonprofit subsidiary of Acha, for financing activities under the age of eighteen. This idea was not accepted by the General Meeting of Acha, and eventually sank.

== Leadership courses for the Deaf ==
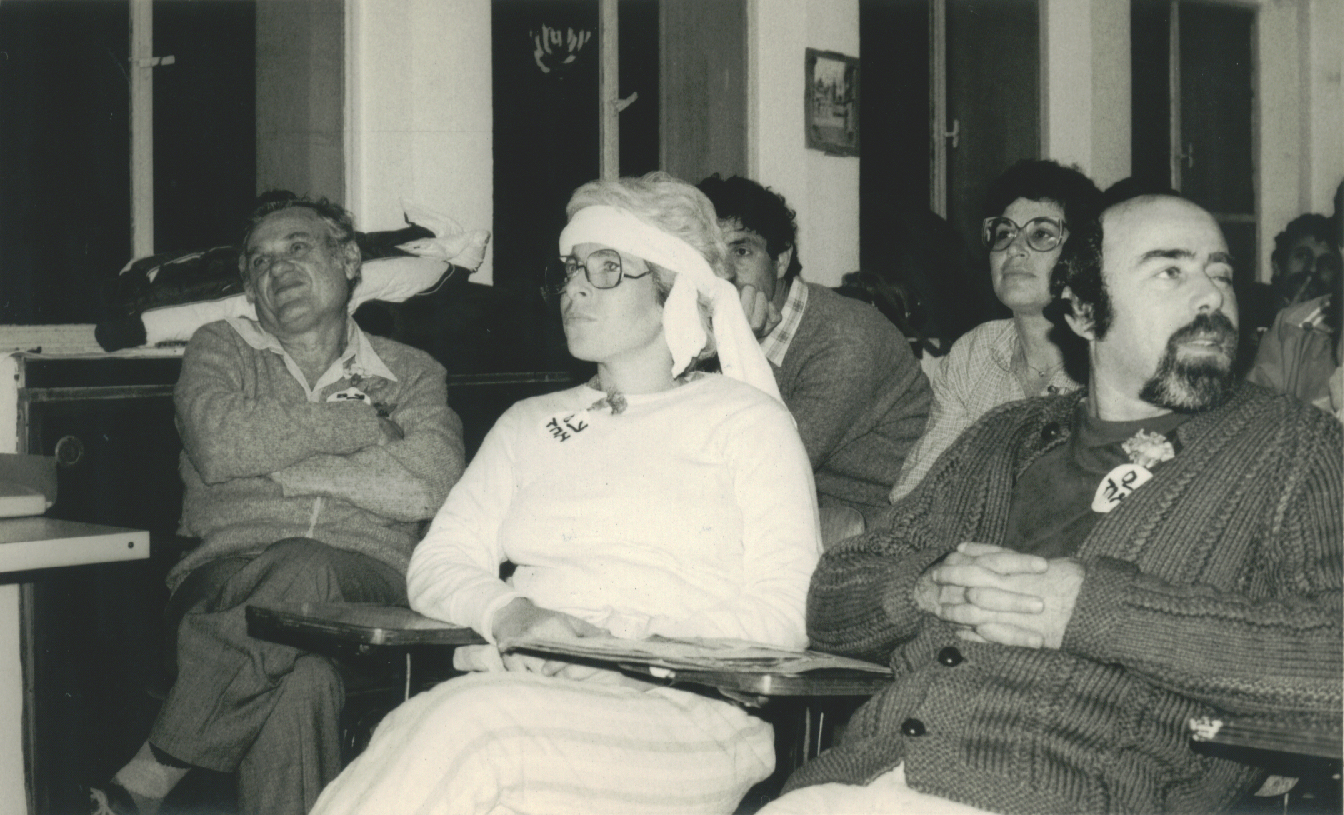
A communities' evening in the leadership course. From the left to the right: Chaim Apter, an Acha employee and coordinator of the course; Ilana Saban, a participant in the course; Shmuel Goldstein (hears), a social worker and the course teacher; Behind Shmuel, Dalia Hopper (hears), a social worker, a teacher in the course and a year later coordinator of social workers in the Acha.

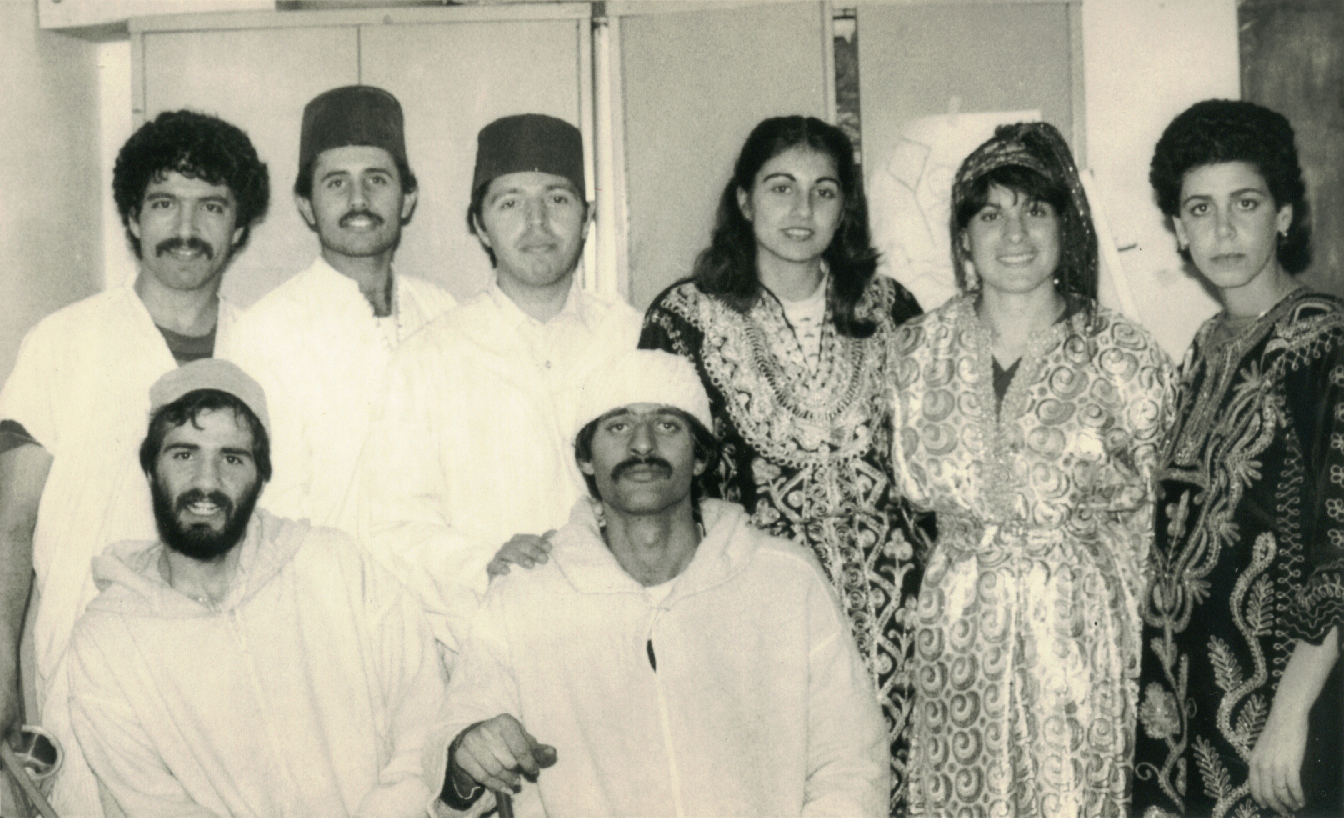
Students of the course in traditional costumes in the evening of the communities. On the right is Suzy, then the chairwoman of the Netanya branch; Third from the right, and first from the left (sitting) – Ilana Abu and Nissim Kakun, who appeared on Channel 1 TV broadcast in the "Listen to Silence" campaign; Second from left (standing) – Avraham Almakias, who was later active in the Acha Haifa branch; third from left (standing) David Ben-David, who was later elected to the Audit Committee of Acha at the General Meeting. Abu married David Cohen, who was also a student of the course, and later was elected as the chairman of Be'er Sheva branch, while Abu served alongside him as the secretary of the branch, and in 1989 Abu was elected to Acha Center.

Shem Tov approved the leadership courses for the Deaf people, which lasted for four consecutive cycles, and each cycle lasted a year. Leadership is the ability of a leader or an elected official to lead a public to a vision or a goal. For being a leader, abilities are needed, and the course provided it. The participants learned these abilities to lead their public to its goal, even if it was a party at the club. The class was attended by Deaf young people from all over the country. They were elected in preliminary sortings conducted by the candidates themselves, when veteran activists of Acha observed them and then took part in the final choice, alongside weighing the results of the young people themselves.

In the leadership courses, the Deaf participants gathered once a week in Tel Aviv, and acquired knowledge of a club leadership by learning civics, teamwork, initiative and creativity, simulation games, communication, conducting a meeting, making decisions and basic concepts in social work. The Seidel Foundation funded the students' participation in several weekends, during which the students received lectures from professionals in the fields of Interpersonal communication, Land of Israel studies and Otorhinolaryngology, with an interpreting of the Israeli sign language. At the end of each course, the Ministry of Labor and Welfare gave to the students the certificates, which were signed by Shem Tov alongside the Ministry of Labor and Welfare. Shem Tov himself came to the leadership course in 1983, passed from a student to a student, talked to everyone, and got to know each one personally. Later, Shem Tov reviewed the activities at Acha and emphasized the need of a "nucleus", which was defined as a teamwork.

These courses were held for four years, until 1986. In the first three years, the students were elected at the beginning of each year. In the fourth year, outstanding students from the previous years participated, and several veteran activists of Acha joined them, including Shem Tov himself, who took a part in the course as a full-time student.

By the request of Acha Jerusalem branch in 1986, Shem Tov approved a leadership course for the members of Jerusalem branch, when they still had a club on Mevo HaMatmid street, before it was destroyed by the Jerusalem Municipality for a road construction. The course was funded by Acha, and taught elected Deaf participants from Jerusalem what a club was, club management, democracy and teamwork with a sign language interpretation. Thanks to the course in Jerusalem, Zamir Levy, who had disputed Shem Tov continuously before the course, was chosen as the chairman of the Jerusalem branch every year.

In the fourth leadership course in Tel Aviv in 1986, Yaakov Arnfeld, who lit a torch on the eve of the Independence Day in 2016, chose his project to find Deaf people who did not come to the Deaf club at Helen Keller House in Tel Aviv. He found out that most of them were in Petah Tikva and lived in Amishav (Hadar Ganim). They claimed that going from Amishav to Yad Eliyahu required them to take three buses in each direction, which was not possible from their point of view. Arnfeld talked with Orna Leshem, a social worker in Acha, and she talked with the Director of the department of the social services in Petach Tikva Municipality. In 1987 they established a club for the Deaf people in Petah Tikva. It puzzled the teacher of the course, who said that Arnfeld, like Saul, searched for stray donkeys and found royalty (a new Deaf club).

=== The reaction of the delegates to the leadership courses ===
Ilana Saban, who graduated successfully the 1983 course, was elected by Shem Tov to the Center in 1984. The delegates of the General Meeting declined it, and conducted a decision in the General Meeting. By this decision, which was put in the regulations of Acha, a candidate who wanted to be elected to the Center, had to gain a practical experience of an activity at the branch for a given period of time before being elected to the Center.

== The band of Sound and Silence ==
Shem Tov, who had a theatrical background, promoted the Kol Ve'Damaa band, which was directed by Moshe Efrati, who danced in Batsheva. After the Sound and Silence band, a theater group of Deaf people was established in Acha, whose name was Ten Fingers and the director was the actor Hemed Schulberg. The liaison between Shem Tov and Schulberg was Ilana Saban, after Shem Tov gave her a full freedom of action in her work with the theater, because her husband Shmuel was a dancer in the group of Sound and Silence. One of the plays which was presented by Ten Fingers was The House of Bernarda Alba, which was entirely presented by the Deaf actors without a single word of speech in the 1988 summer while the World Congress of the Deaf was held in Tel Aviv. In July 1987, Ten Fingers went with Saban to Denmark for appearing also there.

in the 21st century the dancer Amnon Damti continues to perform with Jill, a dancer who hears.

== Deaf and Hard of Hearing people ==
In 1974, Shema addressed Acha and asked to remove the word "mute" from the name of Acha. Shem Tov accepted the request, and the association's name was established as the Association of Deaf People in Israel, instead of the Association of the Deaf-mute People in Israel.

In the summer of 1981, the World Congress of the Jewish Deaf people was held at the International Convention Center (Jerusalem), where Deaf Jews from the world arrived. The congress lasted four days, during which Edna Cohen collected Deaf people to a new association which was called "Keshev: The hard-of-hearing people in Israel". Every deaf person who could talk fluently, joined.

The establishment of Keshev made a resentment in the Acha, and Shem Tov constantly tried to speak with Cohen, suggesting her a leadership inside Acha. Keshev's bureau was in a shelter in Tel Aviv, and Shem Tov promised a better place at the Helen Keller house for the hard of hearing people, with a separate day and a dedicated budget. Cohen replied Shem Tov that the hard of hearing people could not observe sign language, because it was a cultural change for them. Hence their need for an organization which was not a part of the Acha. Eventually Keshev was closed when it spent an extra finance upon the international congress for the hearing impaired in the Jerusalem International Convention Center in 1992.

In the summer of 1983, a professional conference was held at the Astoria Hotel in Tel Aviv, near the Dolphinarium. The conference was upon professional subjects, but during the meeting, words were said between Deaf and hard of hearing participants. At that time, the Ministry of Education decided to close the Niv school in Haifa, and the school principal came to the conference to tell the closure. The news staff of Channel 1 arrived at the hotel to broadcast the closure of the school. When the staff arrived, a hearing participant made a speech about her hearing-impaired daughter as it was determined on the agenda of the conference, and asked the audience to applaud for the sake of the school in Haifa. The news staff did not understand the situation, and left the conference mainly due to noise and difficulties in recording. It made resentment among the Deaf people from Haifa, until Shem Tov went on the stage and shook hands with Mrs. Ahuva Magen, the CEO of Shema, in order to chill out the atmosphere at the conference, which was a professional conference in every aspect.

== The first demonstration of the Deaf people ==
On February 16, 1984, Shem Tov organized the first demonstration of Deaf people opposite to the Knesset in Jerusalem, when the CEO of Acha was Oded Hon. The members of the Acha Jerusalem branch prepared food and drink for the 500 deaf demonstrators which got gathered from Israel. During the demonstration, Shem Tov requested recognition for the Deaf people as disabled people in all aspects, with all the accompanying rights, such as exemption from taxes on hearing aids, Simultaneous translation into sign language in the television, and appropriate professional training which would make it easier for deaf people to integrate into work. Shem Tov requested also discounts in income tax according to the disability percentage which was determined for each disabled person.

== TTY Committee ==
During 1984, Omer Zak, an electrical engineer from the Technion, promoted a project of the TTY in Israel. Zak made a Hebrew software for the VIC-20 and then for the Commodore 64. The Acha was neutral, and Shema made barriers in Zack's project due to the professional considerations of its representative David Rubner, who worked at ECI Telecom.

As a result, in 1985 the General Meeting of Acha approved establishment of a committee of TTY members to promote the issue. An application was made to the TTY manufacturers for presenting their items to the Deaf public, and an exhibition was held in the large hall at the Helen Keller House, attended by four manufacturers: Tadiran, which introduced the Commodore computers; MicroBee, which introduced a personal computer whose software was Basic; RadioShack, which presented a TTY configuration of a laptop, and Yossi Ofir, which presented a TTY with one line of a Hebrew text and two sockets for the handset.

Most of the committee members chose MicroBee because the screen went on by itself when a phone call was received. Commodore did not have an answering machine. Then Zak made an answering machine software for the Commodore by a Cassette tape, when the TTY software was operated by a cartridge, but the committee has already voted MicroBee.

Shem Tov approved the distribution of the MicroBee computers to the Acha branches. Some members of Acha borrowed MicroBee by depositing guarantees for the sake of Acha. After distributing the MicroBees, malfunctions were detected when they were activated. MicroBee distributors did everything to fix the malfunctions, but were unsuccessful due to the model's structural weakness.

At the same time there was an increase in the IBM Personal Computers, but after Microbee there was little motivation of the Deaf people to use a TTY, even though Zak made a software in Hebrew for the IBM-PC and distributed it on a 5.25 inch disk. Telecommunications relay service had not been exist in Israel due to the lack of legislation, and began only in July 2009.

Ezer Levy, who was also a member of the TTY committee, was elected in 1989 as the chairman of Acha, after Shem Tov chose to resign voluntarily. After Levi's election as chairman, Levy decided to replace the TTY with fax, due to his will to communicate with the government and with the public services, and the TTY project collapsed.

== Haifa Branch ==
The Haifa branch of Acha fought for years to obtain a sport playground like in the Helen Keller house. In 1983, the chairman of the Haifa branch consulted with Shem Tov, and got his approval to make the Burla house, the building of the Haifa branch in HaTzionut Avenue, for renting to a banquet hall, which was called "Nof HaCarmel", in order to collect funds for the construction of the playground. When the Burla house was under rent, the entrepreneur made a neon illuminated sign on the outer wall of the Burla house. Two Haifa delegates, Ron Giladi and David Suissa, raised the issue at the General Meeting of Acha in the early 1984. Due to the firm tone of their arguments, Shem-Tov informed the General Meeting that during his visit in the Burla house at Hanukkah party, which was held before the General Meeting, he got the impression that the illuminated sign was inappropriate, and ordered to remove it. After the cancellation of the contract, the entrepreneur sued the chairman of the Haifa branch by a civil lawsuit, the Haifa chairman filed a third-party notice against Shem Tov and Acha, and the suit ended with a compromise. Following the lack of confidence in the Acha General Meeting, the Haifa chairman resigned, and during the four years the Haifa branch ran without a chairman, until a new chairman was elected.
