= The Institute for the Advancement of Deaf Persons in Israel =

Israeli non-profit organization

- Formation: 1993
- Legal status: non-profit
- Purpose: initiate, develop and implement programs for the empowerment & independence of the Israeli deaf and hard-of-hearing community
- Location: Tel Aviv, Israel
- Website: Official website (in Hebrew)

The Institute for the Advancement of Deaf Persons in Israel (Hebrew: המכון לקידום החרש בישראל, Arabic: معهد النهوض بالصم في اسرائيل) was founded in 1993 to provide services and programming to the Israeli deaf community. This includes employment assistance, creation of an electronic Israeli Sign Language dictionary, and organization of a national Deaf Day in 2009 to increase public awareness about the Israeli deaf community and Israeli Sign Language.

The institute is also the coordinator for government-provided interpreting services to deaf Israelis, including providing ISL interpreters, note takers, technology lending, and other support services for deaf university students. These services are handled through the institute's Sela Center. The institute also organizes an annual Student Day (יום הסטודנטים) for deaf and hard-of-hearing university students throughout Israel. In addition, the institute also works with Arab-Israeli deaf communities in Israel, providing Arabic-language materials and professional training to deaf Arab-Israelis and the professionals who work with them, as well as works in conjunction with deaf communities outside of Israel.

== See also ==
- Israeli Sign Language
- Al-Sayyid Bedouin Sign Language
