= Israeli Sign Language =

Sign language used predominantly in Israel

- Shassi, ISL
- שפת הסימנים הישראלית s'fàt ha-simaním ha-yisre'elít שס"י shássi [abbr.]
- Native to: Israel
- Native speakers: 10,000 (2003)
- Language family: German Sign Language family: Israeli Sign Language

Language codes
- ISO 639-3: isr
- Glottolog: isra1236

Israeli Sign Language (Hebrew: שפת הסימנים הישראלית), also known as Shassi or ISL, is the most commonly used sign language by the Deaf community of Israel. Some other sign languages are also used in Israel, among them Al-Sayyid Bedouin Sign Language.

== History ==
The history of ISL goes back to 1873 in Germany, where Marcus Reich, a German Jew, opened a special school for Jewish deaf children. At the time, it was considered one of the best of its kind, which made it popular with Jewish deaf children from all over the world as well as non-Jews. In 1932, several teachers from this school opened the first school for Jewish deaf children in Jerusalem. The sign language used in the Jerusalemite school was influenced by the German Sign Language (DGS), but other sign languages or signing systems brought by immigrants also contributed to the emerging language, which started out as a pidgin. A local creole gradually emerged, which became ISL.

Shassi still shares many features and vocabulary items with DGS, although it is too far apart today to be considered a dialect of the latter.

During the 1940s, Shassi became the language of a well-established community of Jewish deaf people in Jerusalem and Tel Aviv. Today ISL is the most used and taught sign language in Israel, and serves as the main mode of communication for most deaf people in Israel, including Jewish, Muslim and Christian Arabs, Druze, and Bedouins. Some Arab, Druze, and Bedouin towns and villages have sign languages of their own.

In addition to ISL, there is also signed Hebrew used as a tool for teaching deaf children the Hebrew language, and for communication between deaf and hearing people.

On November 29, 2020, the Israeli government decided to establish a unit at the Hebrew Language Academy that will work to preserve and develop Israeli Sign Language.

On June 8, 2026, a bill initiated by Members of Knesset Chili Tropper and Avihai Boaron passed its second and third readings in the Knesset plenum (23 Sivan 5786), and was officially entered into the state's statute book. An official announcement was published on the Knesset website (spokesperson's statements) under the headline "Final Approval: State Recognition of Israeli Sign Language". The report explained that the law authorized the Academy of the Hebrew Language to preserve, develop, and promote Israeli Sign Language (ISL) as the natural language of Deaf people in Israel, with the Minister of Culture and Sports appointed to oversee its implementation. MK Tropper noted: "These are difficult days for the people of Israel, but there are moments of grace, and this is one of them".

Shavim website published an article on the final approval, and Hidabroot website covered the legislation and quoted former MK Shirly Pinto, one of the prominent leaders of this struggle in the past, who welcomed the move and defined it as a "historic day for the State of Israel". After Pinto, Boaz Ahad Ha'am continued the legislation by submitting a work paper at the Knesset on January 28, 2026.

Following the completion of the legislation, the Association of the Deaf in Israel (Acha) designated June 8th as the official annual day to celebrate the recognition of Israeli Sign Language. The date was chosen to create a permanent awareness day on the national calendar dedicated to accessibility, community pride, and Deaf culture in Israel.

== Deaf community ==
The beginnings of an established Deaf community in Israel started with the 1936 Tel Aviv Purim parade, when groups from Jerusalem, Tel Aviv and Haifa met for the first time. This led to the creation of the Association of the Deaf in Israel. The first official board was elected in 1944, with Moshe Bamberger as its first president. The association organized lectures, trips, and holiday celebrations. The community grew as refugees from World War Two fled to Israel, and the association helped new arrivals integrate into the Israeli community by helping them learn Israeli Sign Language and helping them find work. The association completed their Tel Aviv headquarters, Helen Keller House, in 1958.

== Education ==
The first school for the deaf was established in 1932, a strict boarding school in Jerusalem that taught oralism. Two other oralist schools were established in Tel Aviv in 1941 and Haifa in 1949. The emphasis on oralism began to change in the 1970s, when Yitzhak Schlesinger began to research ISL, and with Israel hosting the Fourth International Conference on Deafness in 1973.

== Manual alphabet ==
The manual alphabet is quite similar to that of American Sign Language. The correspondences are as follows:

- א ʽ as ASL 'A', but with thumb extended
- ב b as ASL 'B'
- ג g as ASL 'G'
- ד d as ASL 'D', but with fingers 3, 4, 5 flat and tips touching tip of thumb
- ה h as ASL 'H'
- ו v as ASL '1'
- ז z as ASL 'Z'
- ח ch as ASL '8', but with only index and pinkie extended
- ט t as ASL 'F'
- י j as ASL 'I'
- כ k as ASL 'C'
- ל l as ASL 'L'
- מ m as ASL 'M'
- נ n as ASL 'N'
- ס s as ASL 'S'
- ע ʽ as bent ASL 'V' (like 'X', but with two bent fingers)
- פ p as ASL 'P'
- צ ts as ASL '3'
- ק q as ASL 'K'
- ר r as ASL 'R'
- ש sh as ASL 'W'
- ת t as ASL 'T'

Unexpected correspondences are ASL 'F' for Hebrew ט tet (analogous to Greek theta becoming Cyrillic fita), '1' rather than 'U' or 'V' for ו vav, old-fashioned 'C' and 'K' rather than 'K' and 'Q' for כ kaf and ק qof (both are pronounced like an English 'k' or hard 'c'), '3' for צ tsade (its cursive form quite resembles the Arabic numeral 3), and 'W' for ש shin (reflecting its shape).

If needed, one may indicate the final forms of letters, ך ם ן ף ץ, by moving the hand downward. To specify שׂ sin, the hand is turned to face the signer (showing the back of the hand).

== See also ==
- Moshe Shem Tov
- The Institute for the Advancement of Deaf Persons in Israel
