= Jebusites =

Tribal group described in the Bible

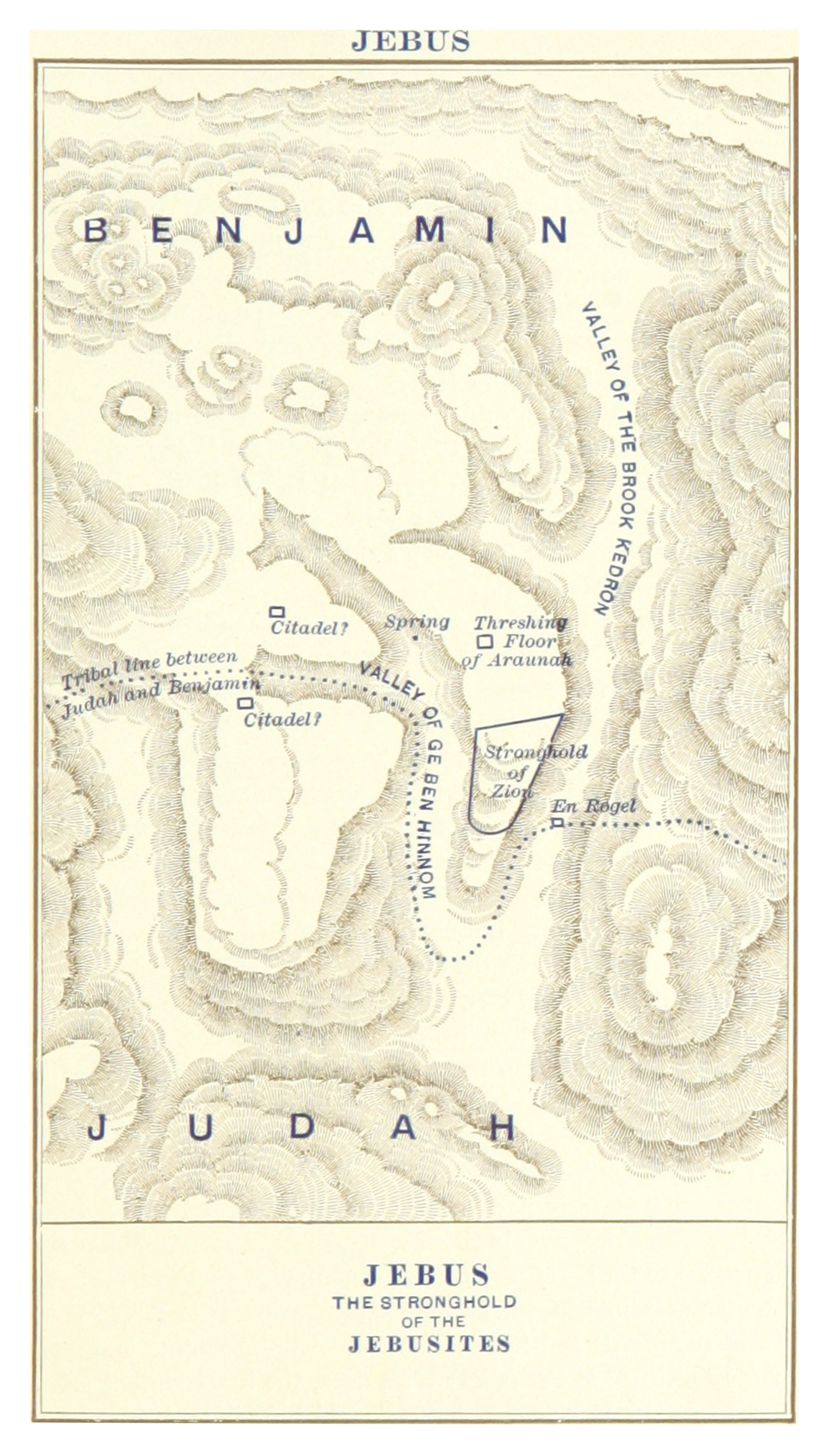
Map of Jebus based on the Biblical account: visible is the Valley of Hinnom (Gehenna), Kidron Valley, Ein Rogel, Araunah's threshing-floor and the Citadel of Zion. (Townsend MacCoun, 1899)

The Jebusites (/ˈdʒɛbjəˌsaɪts/; Hebrew: יְבוּסִי, romanized: Yəḇusi) were, according to the Book of Joshua and Books of Samuel from the Hebrew Bible, a Canaanite tribe that inhabited Jerusalem, called Jebus (Hebrew: יְבוּס, romanized: Yəḇus, lit. 'trampled place') before the conquest initiated by Joshua (Joshua 11:3, Joshua 12:10) and completed by David (2 Samuel 5:6–10). According to some biblical chronologies, it was conquered in 1003 BC.

A majority of scholars agree that the Book of Joshua holds little historical value for the beginnings of the settlement of Hebrew tribes in Canaan, and reflects a much later period.

1 Chronicles 11:4 states that Jerusalem was known as Jebus before this event. Scholars sometimes dispute the identification of Jebus with Jerusalem.

== Identification of Jebus ==
The identification of Jebus with Jerusalem has been disputed, principally by Niels Peter Lemche. Supporting his case, every non-biblical mention of Jerusalem found in the ancient Near East refers to the city as "Jerusalem". An example of these records are the Amarna letters, several of which were written by the chieftain of Jerusalem Abdi-Heba and call Jerusalem either Urusalim (URU ú-ru-sa-lim) or Urušalim (URU ú-ru-ša_{10}-lim) (1330s BC). Also in the Amarna letters, it is called Beth-Shalem, the house of Shalem.

The Sumero-Akkadian name for Jerusalem, uru-salim, is variously etymologised to mean "foundation of [or: by] the god Shalim": from Semitic yry, "to found, to lay a cornerstone", and Shalim, the Canaanite god of the setting sun and the nether world, as well as of health and perfection.

Lemche states:

There is no evidence of Jebus and the Jebusites outside of the Old Testament. Some scholars reckon Jebus to be a different place from Jerusalem; other scholars prefer to see the name of Jebus as a kind of pseudo-ethnic name.

Theophilus G. Pinches has noted a reference to "Yabusu", which he interprets as an old form of Jebus, on a contract tablet that dates from 2200 BC.

== Ethnic origin ==
The Hebrew Bible contains the only surviving ancient text known to use the term Jebusite to describe the inhabitants of Jerusalem; according to the Generations of Noah (Genesis 10), the Jebusites are identified as Canaanites, listed in third place among the Canaanite groups between the biblical Hittites and the Amorites.

Before modern archaeological studies, most biblical scholars held the opinion that the Jebusites were identical to the Hittites, which continues to be the case, though less so. However, an increasingly popular view, first put forward by Edward Lipiński, professor of Oriental and Slavonic studies at KU Leuven, is that the Jebusites were most likely an Amorite tribe; Lipiński identifies them with the group referred to as Yabusi'um in a cuneiform letter found in the archive of Mari, Syria. Lipinski also suggests that more than one clan or tribe bore similar names and thus the Jebusites and Yabusi'um may have been separate people altogether.

In the Amarna letters, mention is made that the contemporaneous king of Jerusalem was named Abdi-Heba, which is a theophoric name invoking a Hurrian goddess named Ḫepat. This implies that the Jebusites were either Hurrians, were heavily influenced by Hurrian culture, or were dominated by the maryannu (a warrior-class elite). Moreover, the last Jebusite king, Araunah, mentioned in 1 Chronicles 21:15, bore a name generally understood as based on the Hurrian honorific ewir-ne.

Richard Hess shows four Hurrian names in the Bible's conquest narrative: Piram, king of Jarmuth and Hoham, king of Hebron (Joshua 10:3), and Sheshai and Talmai, sons of Anak (Joshua 15:14) with Hurrian-based names. Zev Farber believes that the Jebusites were unrecognized Israelites. According to Farber, it explains why the Judahites were confident in delivering the corpse of Adoni-Bezek, a foreign enemy king, to Jebus in Judges 1:7. A similar incident occurred in 1 Samuel 17:54, where David delivers Goliath's head to Jebus, which occurs before the city's conquest. In addition, the Jebusites are portrayed in a more positive light than the residents of Gibeah in the Levite's concubine narrative. Farber believes this was anti-Saul propaganda, with Gibeah being the city of Saul and Jebus being the city of David.

== Biblical narrative ==
The Hebrew Bible describes the Jebusites as dwelling in the mountains beside Jerusalem in Numbers 13:29 and Joshua 11:3. In the narration of the burning bush in Exodus 3:18, the "good and large land, flowing with milk and honey" that was promised to Moses as the future home of the oppressed Hebrews included the land of the Jebusites. According to Joshua 10, Adonizedek led a confederation of Jebusites and the tribes from the neighbouring cities of Jarmuth, Lachish, Eglon and Hebron against Joshua but was soundly defeated and killed. However, Joshua 15:63 states the Judahites could not dislodge the Jebusites, who were living in Jerusalem ("to this day the Jebusites live there with the people of Judah"). Judges 1:21 portrays the Jebusites as continuing to dwell at Jerusalem, within the territory otherwise occupied by the Tribe of Benjamin.

According to 2 Samuel, the Jebusites still controlled Jerusalem at the time of King David, but David wished to take control of the city. Understandably, the Jebusites contest his attempt to do this, and since Jebus was the strongest fortress in Canaan, they gloat that even the "blind and lame" could withstand David's siege.

According to the version of the story in the Masoretic Text, David manages to conquer the city by a surprise attack, led by Joab, through the water supply tunnels (Jerusalem has no natural water supply except for the Gihon Spring). Ever since its discovery in the 19th century, Warren's Shaft, part of a system which connects the spring to the city, has been cited as evidence for the plausibility of such a line of attack. The account in 1 Chronicles 11:5 mentions the advantage of a speedy attack but does not mention use of the water shafts, and the claim could be a scribal error; the Septuagint version of the passage states that the Israelites had to attack the Jebusites "with their dagger[s]" rather than "through the water shaft". 1 Chronicles states that the inhabitants of Jebus forbade King David from entering Jerusalem shortly after he was crowned king. Joab went up first and took the city and became chief and captain of David's armed forces. 1 Kings 9:20-21 states that Solomon forced the surviving Jebusites to become serfs.

Another Jebusite, Araunah (referred to as Ornan by the Books of Chronicles) is described by the Books of Samuel as having sold his threshing floor to King David, which David then constructed an altar on, the implication being that the altar became the core of the Solomon's Temple. Araunah means "the lord" in Hurrian and was loaned into Hittite, and so most scholars, since they consider the Jebusites to have been Hittites, have argued that Araunah may have been another king of Jerusalem; some scholars additionally believe that Adonijah is a disguised reference to Araunah, the ר (r) having been corrupted to ד (d). At many periods the letters are virtually indistinguishable. The argument originated from Cheyne, who proposed the reverse. The narrative is considered by some scholars to be aetiological and of dubious historicity.

It is unknown what ultimately became of these Jebusites. According to the "Jebusite hypothesis", however, the Jebusites persisted as inhabitants of Jerusalem and comprised an important faction in the Kingdom of Judah, including such notables as Zadok the priest, Nathan the prophet, and Bathsheba, queen and mother of the next monarch, Solomon. According to this hypothesis, after the disgrace of a rival Elide faction of priests in the struggle for succession to David, the Zadokites became the sole authorized priests, so a Jebusite family monopolized the Jerusalem clergy for many centuries before becoming sufficiently attenuated to be indistinguishable from other Judeans or Judahites.

Elsewhere in the Bible, the Jebusites are described in a manner that suggests that they worshipped the same god, Elyon, as the Israelites (e.g., Melchizedek). Further support for this theory comes from the fact that other Jebusites resident in pre-Israelite Jerusalem bore names invoking the principle or god Zedek (Tzedek) (e.g., Melchizedek and Adonizedek). Under this theory the Aaronic lineage ascribed to Zadok is a later, anachronistic interpolation. A Jebusite is mentioned in the Acts of Barnabas as accompanying his martyrdom.

== Classical rabbinical perspectives ==
According to classical rabbinical literature, the Jebusites derived their name from the city of Jebus, the ancient Jerusalem, which they inhabited. These rabbinical sources also argue that as part of the price of Abraham's purchase of the Cave of the Patriarchs (Cave of Machpelah), which lay in the territory of the Jebusites, the Jebusites made Abraham grant them a covenant that his descendants would not take control of Jebus against the will of the Jebusites, and then the Jebusites engraved the covenant into bronze; the sources state that the presence of the bronze statues was why the Israelites were not able to conquer the city during Joshua's campaign.

The rabbis of the classical era go on to state that King David was prevented from entering the city of Jebus for the same reason, and so he promised the reward of captaincy to anyone who destroyed the bronzes – Joab performing the task and so gained the prize. The covenant is dismissed by the rabbis as having been invalidated due to the war the Jebusites fought against Joshua, but nevertheless David (according to the rabbis) paid the Jebusites the full value of the city, collecting the money from among all the Israelite tribes, so that the city became their common property.

In reference to 2 Samuel 5:6, which refers to a saying about the blind and the lame, Rashi quotes a midrash which argues that the Jebusites had two statues in their city, with their mouths containing the words of the covenant between Abraham and the Jebusites; one figure, depicting a blind person, represented Isaac, and the other, depicting a lame person, representing Jacob.

== Modern usage ==
The politicians Yasser Arafat and Faisal Husseini, among others, have claimed that Palestinian Arabs are descended from the Jebusites, arguing that Palestinians have a historic claim to Jerusalem that precedes the Jewish one. Professor Eric H. Cline of the George Washington University Anthropology Department asserts that a general consensus exists among historians and archeologists that modern Palestinians are "more closely related to the Arabs of Saudi Arabia, Yemen, Jordan, and other countries" than to the Jebusites, and that they lack any significant connection to them. Johns Hopkins University Professor William F. Albright questioned "the surprising tenacity" of "the myth of the unchanging East" and rejected any assertion of continuity between the "folk beliefs and practices of the modern peasants and nomads" and "pre-Arab times".

== See also ==
- Names of Jerusalem
- Proselyte
- Zion
