= Isaiah 48 =

Book of Isaiah, chapter 48

- ← chapter 47 chapter 49 →
- The Great Isaiah Scroll, the best preserved of the biblical scrolls found at Qumran from the second century BC, contains all the verses in this chapter.
- Book: Book of Isaiah
- Hebrew Bible part: Nevi'im
- Order in the Hebrew part: 5
- Category: Latter Prophets
- Christian Bible part: Old Testament
- Order in the Christian part: 23

Isaiah 48 is the forty-eighth chapter of the Book of Isaiah in the Hebrew Bible or the Old Testament of the Christian Bible. This book contains the prophecies attributed to the prophet Isaiah, and is one of the Books of the Prophets. Chapters 40-55 are known as "Deutero-Isaiah" and date from the time of the Israelites' exile in Babylon. According to John Skinner, this chapter, which is "largely a recapitulation of certain outstanding themes of the prophecy", consists of "exhortations addressed to the exiles in the near prospect of deliverance".

== Text ==
The original text was written in Hebrew language. This chapter is divided into 22 verses.

=== Textual witnesses ===
Some early manuscripts containing the text of this chapter in Hebrew are of the Masoretic Text tradition, which includes the Codex Cairensis (895), the Petersburg Codex of the Prophets (916), Aleppo Codex (10th century), Codex Leningradensis (1008).

Fragments containing parts of this chapter were found among the Dead Sea Scrolls (3rd century BC or later):

- 1QIsa^{a}: complete
- 1QIsa^{b}: extant verses 17‑22
- 4QIsa^{c} (4Q57): extant verses 10‑13, 17‑19
- 4QIsa^{d} (4Q58): extant verses 8‑22

There is also a translation into Koine Greek known as the Septuagint, made in the last few centuries BCE. Extant ancient manuscripts of the Septuagint version include Codex Vaticanus (B; $\mathfrak{G}$^{B}; 4th century), Codex Sinaiticus (S; BHK: $\mathfrak{G}$^{S}; 4th century), Codex Alexandrinus (A; $\mathfrak{G}$^{A}; 5th century) and Codex Marchalianus (Q; $\mathfrak{G}$^{Q}; 6th century).

== Parashot ==
The parashah sections listed here are based on the Aleppo Codex. Isaiah 48 is a part of the Consolations (Isaiah 40–66). {P}: open parashah; {S}: closed parashah.

{S} 48:1-2 {S} 48:3-11 {P} 48:12-16 {P} 48:17-19 {S} 48:20-22 {P}

== Israel's Stubbornness (48:1–11) ==
=== Verse 1 ===
Hear ye this, O house of Jacob,
which are called by the name of Israel,
and are come forth out of the waters of Judah,
which swear by the name of the Lord,
and make mention of the God of Israel,
but not in truth, nor in righteousness.

The community of Israel is accused of falsity in their commitment to YHWH and appears to be the cause of complaint in this passage.

== Deliverance Promised to Israel {48:12–22) ==
=== Verses 20–21 ===
The Lord has redeemed his servant Jacob!
They did not thirst when he led them through the deserts;
he made water flow for them from the rock;
he split open the rock and the water gushed out.

A "closing hymn of praise".

== See also ==
- Babylon
- Chaldean
- Israel
- Jacob
- Judah
- Related Bible parts: Matthew 15, Matthew 23, 2 Timothy 3

== Sources ==
- Coggins, R (2007). "22. Isaiah". In Barton, John; Muddiman, John (eds.). The Oxford Bible Commentary (first (paperback) ed.). Oxford University Press. pp. 433–486. ISBN 978-0199277186.
- Würthwein, Ernst (1995). The Text of the Old Testament. Translated by Rhodes, Erroll F. Grand Rapids, MI: Wm. B. Eerdmans. ISBN 0-8028-0788-7.
