= Moriah =

Location in the Book of Genesis

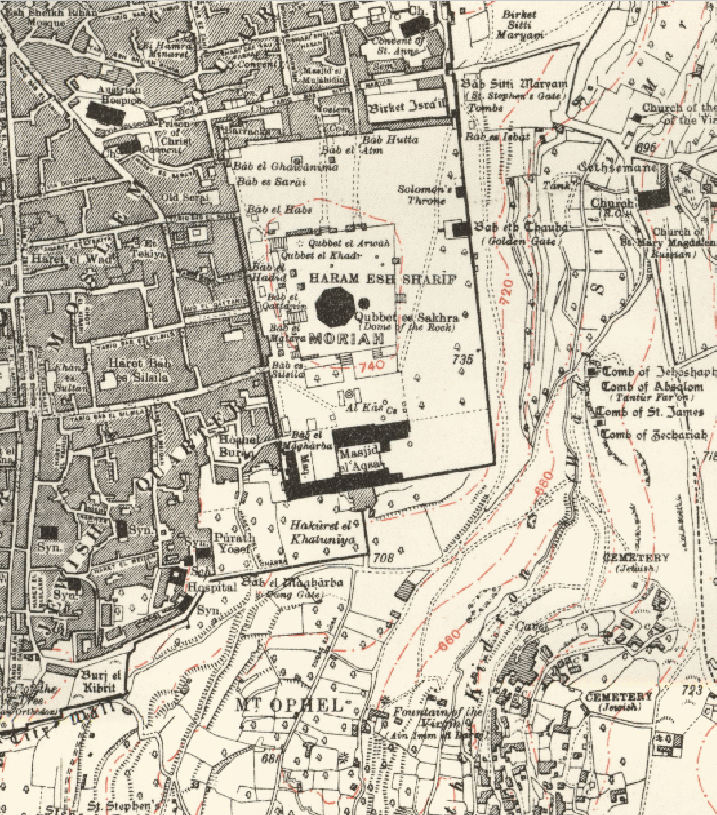
Map of Jerusalem in 1925, showing the location of Mount Moriah according to Jewish sources

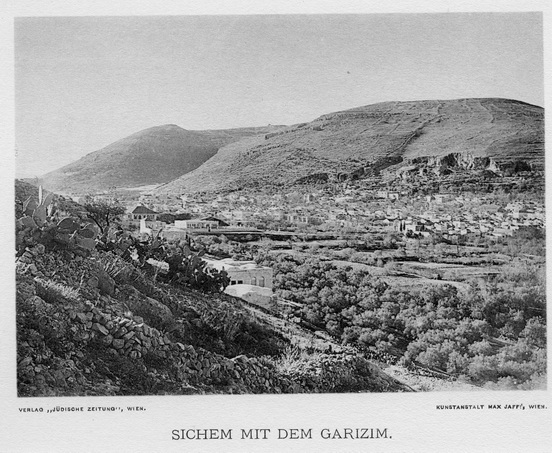
The area around Mount Gerizim is identified by the Samaritans as the "land of Moriah", or "Moreh".

Moriah /mɒˈraɪə/ (Hebrew: מוֹרִיָּה) is the name given in the Book of Genesis to the region where the binding of Isaac by Abraham is said to have taken place. Jews identify the region mentioned in Genesis and the specific mountain in which the event is said to have occurred with "Mount Moriah", mentioned in the Book of Chronicles as the place where Solomon's Temple is said to have been built, and both these locations are also identified with the current Temple Mount in Jerusalem. The Samaritan Torah, on the other hand, transliterates the place mentioned for the binding of Isaac as Moreh, a name for the region near modern-day Nablus. It is believed by the Samaritans that the near-sacrifice actually took place on Mount Gerizim, near Nablus in the West Bank.

Many Muslims, in turn, believe the place mentioned in the first book of the Bible, rendered as Marwa in Arabic in the Quran, is actually located close to the Kaaba in Mecca, Saudi Arabia. There has been a historical account of rams' horns preserved in the Kaaba until the year 683, which are believed to be the remains of the sacrifice of Ishmael – the first son of Abraham, who most Muslims believe was the son Abraham tied down and almost sacrificed, and not Isaac.

== Biblical references ==
In an Jewish Bible, Moriyya and/or Moriah (Hebrew: מוֹרִיָּה) occur twice, with differences of spelling between different manuscripts. Tradition has interpreted these two as the same place:

- Genesis: "Then God said, 'Take your son, your only son, whom you love—Isaac—and go to the region of Moriyya. Sacrifice him there as a burnt offering on a mountain I will show you.'"
- 2 Chronicles: "Then Solomon began to build the temple of the LORD in Jerusalem, on Mount Moriah, where the LORD had appeared to his father David. It was on the threshing floor of Araunah the Jebusite, the place provided by David."

== Speculation and debate ==
Whereas the mention of Moriah in Genesis could be referring to any mountainous region, the Book of Chronicles says that the location of Araunah's threshing floor is on "Mount Moriah" and that the Temple of Solomon was built over Araunah's threshing floor. This has led to the classical rabbinical supposition that the Moriah region mentioned in Genesis as the place where Abraham almost sacrificed Isaac was in Jerusalem.

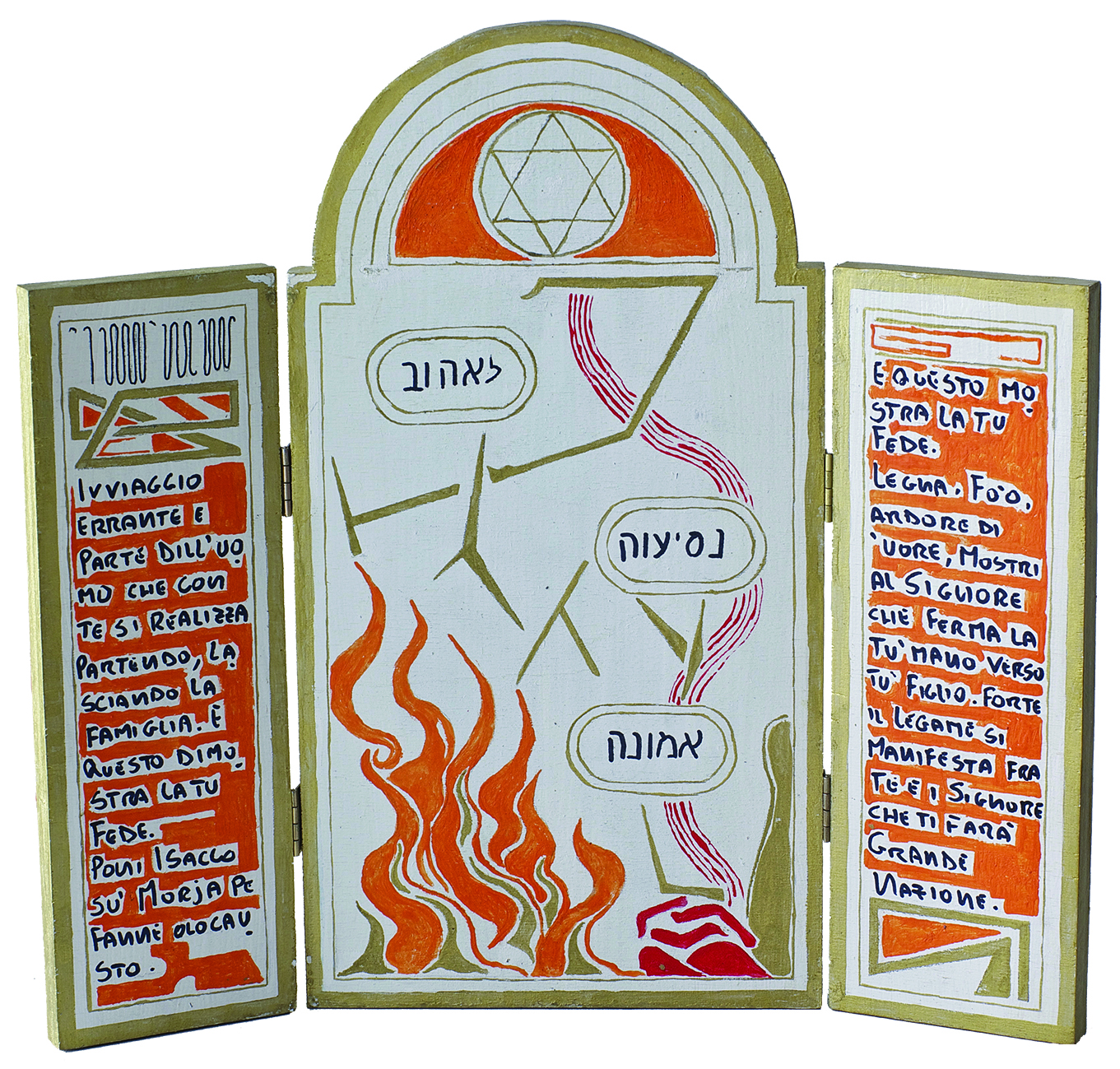
Jewish Golden Books by Filippo Biagioli, dedicated to Mount Moriah and Abraham

In consequence of these traditions, classical rabbinical literature theorised that the name was a (linguistically corrupted) reference to the Temple, suggesting translations like the teaching-place (referring to the Sanhedrin that met there), the place of fear (referring to the supposed fear that non-Israelites would have at the Temple), the place of myrrh (referring to the spices burnt as incense). On the other hand, some interpretations of a biblical passage concerning Melchizedek, king of Salem, would indicate Jerusalem was already a city with a priest at the time of Abraham, and thus is unlikely to have been founded on the lonely spot where Abraham tried to sacrifice Isaac.

There is also debate as to whether the two references to Moriyya/Moriah (Genesis 22:2 and 2 Chronicles 3:1) are correctly understood as the same name. Ancient translators seem to have interpreted them differently: whereas all ancient translations simply transliterated the name in Chronicles, in Genesis they tended to try to understand the literal meaning of the name and to translate it. For example, in the Greek Septuagint translation, these verses are translated as:

- Genesis 22:2: "And he said, Take thy son, the beloved one, whom thou hast loved—Isaac, and go into the high land (Koine Greek: εἰς τὴν γῆν τὴν ὑψηλὴν), and offer him there for a whole-burnt-offering on one of the mountains which I will tell thee of."
- 2 Chronicles 3:1: "And Solomon began to build the house of the Lord in Jerusalem in the mount of Amoria, where the Lord appeared to his father David, in the place which David had prepared in the threshing-floor of Ornan the Jebusite."

Moreover, other ancient translations interpret the instance in Genesis in different ways from the Septuagint:

- The Samaritan Pentateuch spells the name differently from the Hebrew-alphabet text, giving "’ereṣ hammôrā’āh", which seems to interpret the name as coming from the root rā’āh ("to see"), and accordingly means "the land of vision". Correspondingly, Symmachus's Greek translation renders the Genesis place-name as "tês optasías" ("into the land of appearance/manifestation") and Jerome's Latin Vulgate similarly says "in terram Visionis" ("into the land of Vision"). Forming a religion closely related to Judaism, Samaritans disagree with the Jewish view that the binding of Isaac took place in the Temple Mount in Jerusalem, claiming instead that it happened in Mount Gerizim in the West Bank.
- Targum Pseudo-Jonathan interprets the name as land of worship.

Some modern biblical scholars, however, regard the name as a reference to the Amorites, having lost the initial a via aphesis; the name is thus interpreted as meaning land of the Amorites. This agrees with the Septuagint, where, for example, 2 Chronicles 3:1 refers to the location as Ἀμωρία. Some scholars also identify it with Moreh, the location near Shechem at which Abraham built an altar, according to Genesis 12:6. Hence a number of scholars believe that the "מוריה" mentioned in Genesis actually refers to a hill near Shechem, supporting the Samaritan belief that the near-sacrifice of Isaac occurred on Mount Gerizim – a location near Shechem.

Using the two full days' travel referred to in Genesis 22:3-4, where "on the third day", the place determined by God was visible "afar off", H. E. Ryle assumes that "'the third day' indicates a journey of 30 or 40 miles. The journey from Beer-sheba to Jerusalem is computed to take less than 24 hours." Genesis 21:31-33 and 22:19 refer to Abraham living at Beersheba.

== See also ==
- Mount Zion
