= 1 Chronicles 21 =

First Book of Chronicles, chapter 21

- ← chapter 20 chapter 22 →
- The complete Hebrew text of the Books of Chronicles (1 and 2 Chronicles) in the Leningrad Codex (1008 CE).
- Book: Books of Chronicles
- Category: Ketuvim
- Christian Bible part: Old Testament
- Order in the Christian part: 13

1 Chronicles 21 is the twenty-first chapter of the Books of Chronicles in the Hebrew Bible or the First Book of Chronicles in the Old Testament of the Christian Bible. The book is compiled from older sources by an unknown person or group, designated by modern scholars as "the Chronicler", and had the final shape established in late fifth or fourth century BCE. This chapter records the account of David's census, its consequences and the purchase of a site for the temple. The whole chapter belongs to the section focusing on the kingship of David (1 Chronicles 9:35 to 29:30).

== Text ==
This chapter was originally written in the Hebrew language. It is divided into 30 verses.

=== Textual witnesses ===
Some early manuscripts containing the text of this chapter in Hebrew are of the Masoretic Text tradition, which includes the Aleppo Codex (10th century), and Codex Leningradensis (1008).

Extant manuscripts of a Koine Greek translation known as the Septuagint, made in the last few centuries BCE, include Codex Vaticanus (B; $\mathfrak{G}$^{B}; 4th century), Codex Alexandrinus (A; $\mathfrak{G}$^{A}; 5th century) and Codex Marchalianus (Q; $\mathfrak{G}$^{Q}; 6th century). (Note: The extant Codex Sinaiticus only contains 1 Chronicles 9:27–19:17.)

=== Old Testament references ===
- 1 Chronicles 21:1–6: Exodus 30:11–16; 2 Samuel 24:1–9
- 1 Chronicles 21:7–13:2 Samuel 24:10–14
- 1 Chronicles 21:14–17:2 Samuel 24:15–17
- 1 Chronicles 21:18–30:2 Samuel 24:18–25

== David’s military census (21:1–6) ==
The Chronicler reinterprets and supplements the account in 2 Samuel 24, taking the perspective of Job chapter 1. Instead of "the anger of the LORD" (2 Samuel 24:1), the one who persuaded David to carry out a census is "Satan", a Hebrew word which should be translated as "an adversary" rather than a personal name, more likely is the same figure mentioned in Job 1:6ff and Zechariah 3:1ff. David's guilt is pronounced strongly by Joab (more than in 2 Samuel 24) as the word 'trespass' (verse 3; NRSV, 'guilt') is used to emphasize David's responsibility. The Chronicler simply documents the result of the census, excluding the individual stages (due to its insignificance or incomprehensibility) recorded in 2 Samuel 24.

=== Verse 5 ===
And Joab gave the sum of the numbering of the people to David. In all Israel there were 1,100,000 men who drew the sword, and in Judah 470,000 who drew the sword.

- "1,100,000": the number of able men in the united kingdom of Israel and Judah, of whom 800,000 is reported in 2 Samuel 24:9, with the addition of twelve special armies each consisting of 24,000 men, for a total of 288,000, and 12,000 horsemen in chariot cities as well as at Jerusalem (2 Chronicles 1:14).
- "470,000": the total of the Judeans. 2 Samuel 24:9 has 500,000; apparently including 30,000 David's chosen warriors in 2 Samuel 6:1.

=== Verse 6 ===
But he did not count Levi and Benjamin among them, for the king’s word was abominable to Joab.

Numbers 1:49 forbids to take a military census among the Levites, whereas the tribe of Benjamin was probably excluded because 'the tabernacle resided upon its territory'.

== Judgment for David’s sin (21:7–13) ==
The passage emphasizes on YHWH's disapproval, not David's remorse (as in 2 Samuel 24) because David was persuaded by Satan, so it has the statement 'he struck Israel' forecasting the events reported in verse 14.

== A plague on Israel (21:14–17) ==
The sin of David resulted in the death of Israelites (verse 14; cf. 2 Samuel 11:17–26; 12:15–19; 24:15).

=== Verse 14 ===
So the Lord sent a plague throughout Israel, and seventy thousand men of Israel fell.

This sentence is followed in 2 Samuel 24:15 by "from the morning even to the time appointed," so if "the time appointed" means 'the time of the evening sacrifice', then God shortened the three days to a short one day.

=== Verse 16 ===
David lifted up his eyes and saw the angel of the Lord standing between earth and heaven with his sword drawn in his hand stretched out over Jerusalem. So David and the elders, covered in sackcloth, fell on their faces.

The Chronicler describes the angel hanging in the air, recalling the descriptions in Numbers 22:31 and Joshua 5:13-15 (cf. also verse 18); furthermore cf. Daniel 8:15; 12:6.

== David builds an altar (21:18–30) ==
In verses 21–25, the purchase of Ornan's threshingfloor is patterned after Abraham's purchase of Machpelah's cave (Genesis 23), including the insistence on paying the full price (an expression used only in Genesis 23:9 and verses 22, 24). The 600 silver shekels David pays is more than Abraham's 400 silver shekels for Machpelah's cave, alluding the higher value of temple site than Sarah's burial site (600 is also a multiple of 12, an important number in various ways in the Chronicles). Verses 29–30 explain that because an angel obstructed his way, David had to make sacrifices on Ornan's threshing-floor, instead of at the high place at Gibeon.

=== Verse 18 ===
Then the angel of the Lord commanded Gad to tell David that David should go up and raise an altar to the Lord on the threshing floor of Ornan the Jebusite.

The command to erect an altar on the threshing-floor of Ornan (the later name for Araunah) was given only by Gad in 2 Samuel 24, is clarified in Chronicles as originated from the angel of YHWH.

== See also ==
- David's Mighty Warriors
- House of David
- Jerusalem
- Zeruiah
- Related Bible parts: Genesis 23, Exodus 30, Numbers 23, 2 Samuel 11, 2 Samuel 11, 2 Samuel 23, 2 Samuel 24, Job 1, Zechariah 3

== Sources ==
- Ackroyd, Peter R (1993). "Chronicles, Books of". In Metzger, Bruce M; Coogan, Michael D (eds.). The Oxford Companion to the Bible. Oxford University Press. pp. 113–116. ISBN 978-0195046458.
- Bennett, William (2018). The Expositor's Bible: The Books of Chronicles. Litres. ISBN 978-5040825196.
- Coogan, Michael David (2007). Coogan, Michael David; Brettler, Marc Zvi; Newsom, Carol Ann; Perkins, Pheme (eds.). The New Oxford Annotated Bible with the Apocryphal/Deuterocanonical Books: New Revised Standard Version, Issue 48 (Augmented 3rd ed.). Oxford University Press. ISBN 9780195288810.
- Endres, John C. (2012). First and Second Chronicles. Liturgical Press. ISBN 9780814628447.
- Hill, Andrew E. (2003). First and Second Chronicles. Zondervan. ISBN 9780310206101.
- Mabie, Frederick (2017). "I. The Chronicler's Genealogical Survey of All Israel". In Longman III, Tremper; Garland, David E (eds.). 1 and 2 Chronicles. The Expositor's Bible Commentary. Zondervan. pp. 267–308. ISBN 978-0310531814.
- Mathys, H. P. (2007). "14. 1 and 2 Chronicles". In Barton, John; Muddiman, John (eds.). The Oxford Bible Commentary (first (paperback) ed.). Oxford University Press. pp. 267–308. ISBN 978-0199277186.
- Selman, Martin J. (1994). 1 Chronicles: An Introduction and Commentary. Tyndale Old Testament commentaries. Inter-Varsity Press. ISBN 978-0851118475.
- Tuell, Steven S. (2012). First and Second Chronicles. Westminster John Knox Press. ISBN 978-0664238650.
- Walvoord, John F.; Zuck, Roy B. (2002). The Bible Knowledge Commentary: Old Testament and New Testament. David C. Cook. ISBN 9780896938007.
- Würthwein, Ernst (1995). The Text of the Old Testament. Translated by Rhodes, Erroll F. Grand Rapids, MI: William B. Eerdmans. ISBN 0-8028-0788-7.
