= Demographics of Cambodia =

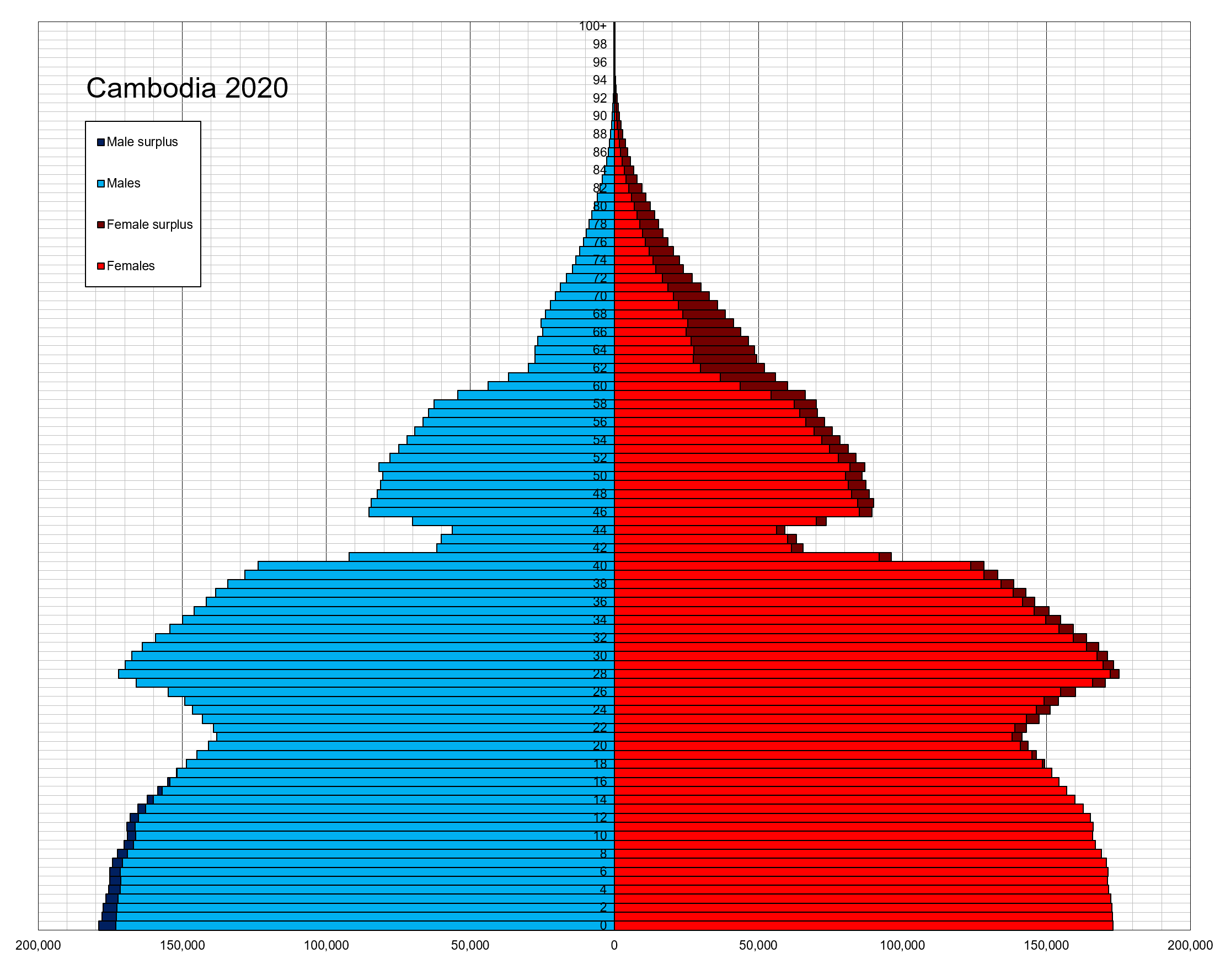
- Cambodia population pyramid in 2020
- Population: 17,280,543 (2024 Survey)
- Growth rate: ▲1.63% (2014)
- Birth rate: 19.3 births/1,000 population (2021 est.)
- Death rate: 6.8 deaths/1,000 population (2021 est.)
- Life expectancy: 69.6 years (2018 est.)
  - male: 67.3 years
  - female: 71.6 years
- Fertility rate: 2.34 children born/woman (2021 est.)
- Infant mortality: 24 deaths/1,000 live births (2018 est.)
- Net migration rate: ▼0.32 migrant(s)/1,000 population (2014 est.)

Age structure
- 0–14 years: 26.8%
- 15–64 years: 63.1%
- 65 and over: 10.1%

Sex ratio
- Total: 0.95 male(s)/female (2024)
- At birth: 1.04 male(s)/female
- 65 and over: 0.68 male(s)/female

Nationality
- Nationality: noun: Cambodian(s), Khmer(s); Kampuchean(s) (historical) adjective: Cambodian, Khmer; Kampuchean (historical)
- Major ethnic: Khmer
- Minor ethnic: Chinese, Vietnamese, Cham, and others

Language
- Official: Khmer

Demographic features of the population of Cambodia include population density, ethnicity, education level, health of the populace, economic status, religious affiliations and other aspects of the population.

== Population size and structure ==
Historical populations
Year	Pop.	±% p.a.
1876	890,000	—
1901	1,103,000	+0.86%
1911	1,487,900	+3.04%
1921	2,402,600	+4.91%
1931	2,806,000	+1.56%
1947	3,296,000	+1.01%
1951	4,261,000	+6.63%
1961	5,510,000	+2.60%
1971	7,270,000	+2.81%
1981	6,682,000	−0.84%
1991	8,810,000	+2.80%
2001	12,353,000	+3.44%
2011	14,701,717	+1.76%
2019	15,552,211	+0.71%
Source: CIA World Factbook

Population development

Between 1874 and 1921, the total population of Cambodia increased from about 946,000 to 2.4 million. By 1950, it had increased to between 3,710,107 and 4,073,967, and in 1962 it had reached 5.7 million. From the 1960s until 1975, the population of Cambodia increased by about 2.2% yearly, the lowest increase in Southeast Asia.

By 1975 when the Khmer Rouge took power, the population was estimated at 7.3 million. Of this total an estimated one to two million reportedly died between 1975 and 1978. In 1981, the PRK gave the official population figure as nearly 6.7 million, although approximately 6.3 million to 6.4 million is probably more accurate.

The average annual rate of population growth from 1978 to 1985 was 2.3% (see table 2, Appendix A). A post-Khmer Rouge baby boom pushed the population above 10 million, although growth has slowed in recent years.

In 1959, about 45% of the population was under 15 years of age. By 1962, this had increased slightly to 46%. In 1962, an estimated 52% of the population was between 15 and 64 years of age, while 2% were older than 65. The percentage of males and females in the three groups was almost the same. According to Inter-Censal Survey TFR of Cambodia was 2.5 in 2024.

=== Age distribution ===
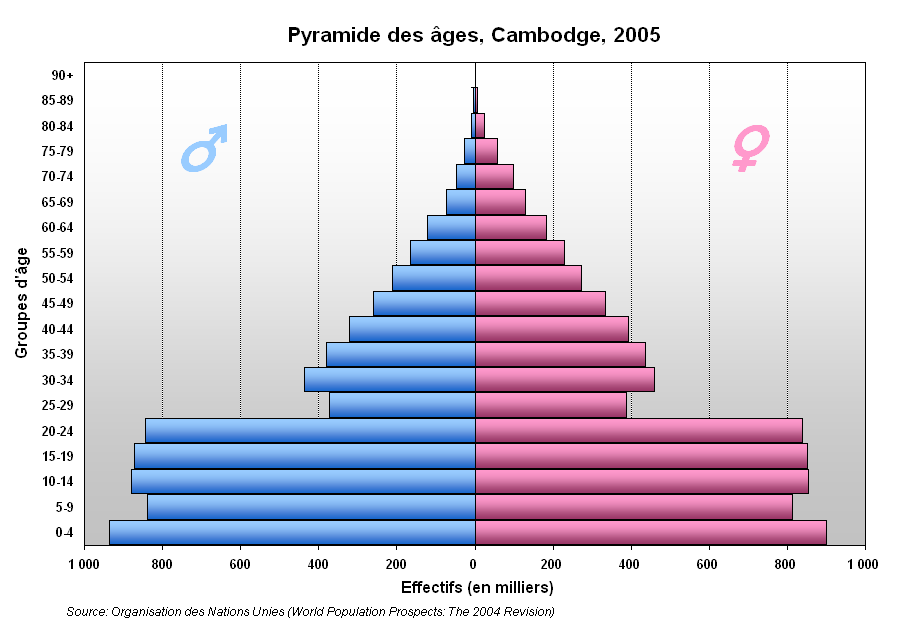
Cambodian Population Pyramid-2005

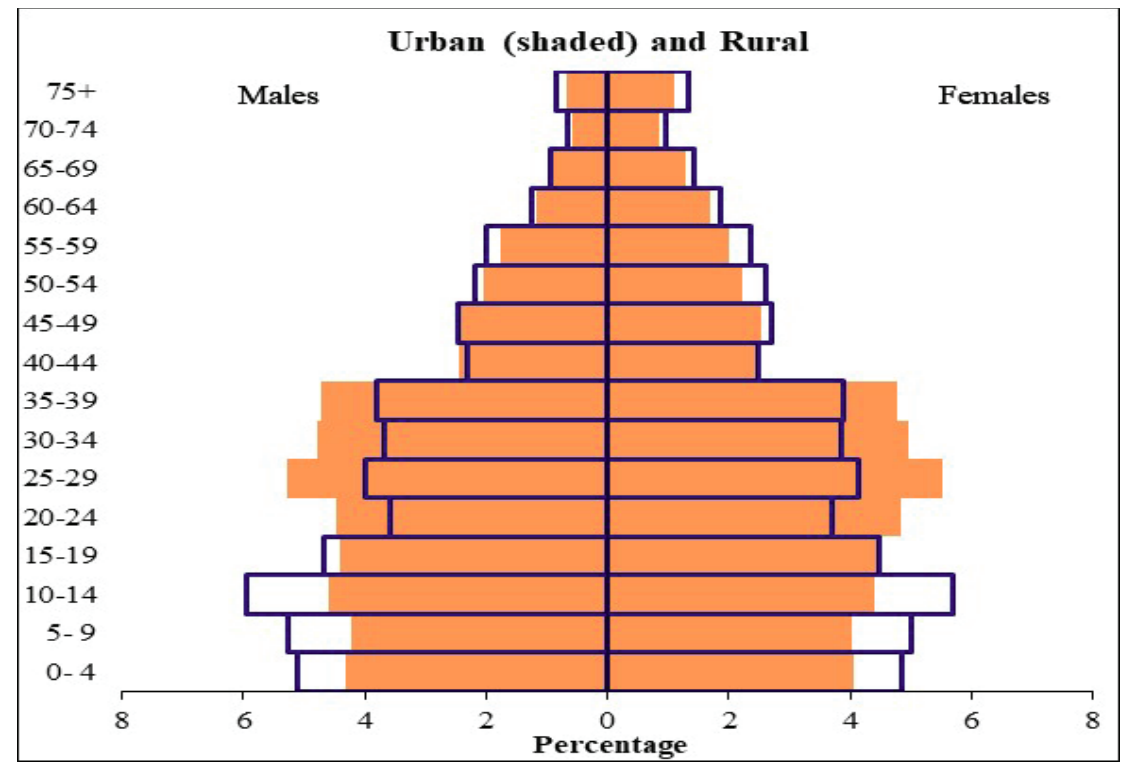
Population pyramid, urban-rural, Cambodia, 2019

Year	Total population (thousands)	Population percentage		
Year	Total population (thousands)	aged 0–14	aged 15–64	aged 65+
1950	4 346	42.2%	55.1%	2.7%
1955	4 840	42.3%	55.0%	2.7%
1960	5 433	42.5%	54.8%	2.7%
1965	6 141	42.8%	54.4%	2.7%
1970	6 938	43.2%	54.0%	2.8%
1975	7 308	42.3%	54.9%	2.8%
1980	6 306	39.0%	58.1%	2.9%
1985	7 920	42.1%	55.0%	2.9%
1990	9 532	43.8%	53.4%	2.8%
1995	11 169	47.5%	49.7%	2.8%
2000	12 447	41.6%	55.4%	3.0%
2005	13 358	36.4%	60.3%	3.3%
2010	14 138	31.9%	64.3%	3.8%
2015	15 521	31.6%	64.3%	4.1%
2020	16 719	30.9%	64.2%	4.9%

Population Estimates by Sex and Age Group (01.VII.2013) (Excluding foreign diplomatic personnel and their dependents. Data based on the 2008 Population Census):

Age group	Male	Female	Total	%
Total	7 320 112	7 642 479	14 962 591	100
0–4	806 531	777 854	1 584 385	10.59
5–9	721 480	693 339	1 414 819	9.46
10–14	768 899	735 963	1 504 862	10.06
15–19	878 612	830 980	1 709 592	11.43
20–24	848 931	800 737	1 649 668	11.03
25–29	678 825	712 044	1 390 869	9.30
30–34	613 674	637 973	1 251 647	8.37
35–39	338 735	363 397	702 132	4.69
40–44	411 072	441 415	852 487	5.70
45–49	344 372	395 214	739 586	4.94
50–54	295 645	352 214	648 347	4.33
55–59	190 528	288 806	479 334	3.20
60–64	153 721	218 867	372 588	2.49
65–69	105 605	147 502	253 107	1.69
70–74	76 017	108 069	184 086	1.23
75–79	47 601	72 558	120 159	0.80
80+	39 864	65 059	104 923	0.70
Age group	Male	Female	Total	Percent
0–14	2 296 910	2 207 156	4 504 066	30.10
15–64	4 754 115	5 042 135	9 796 250	65.47
65+	269 087	393 188	662 275	4.43

Population Estimates by Sex and Age Group (01.VII.2021) (Data based on the 2019 Population Census.):

Age group	Male	Female	Total	%
Total	8 093 453	8 498 636	16 592 089	100
0–4	791 593	755 468	1 547 061	9.32
5–9	792 080	756 481	1 548 561	9.33
10–14	843 604	804 317	1 647 921	9.93
15–19	799 876	773 934	1 573 810	9.49
20–24	647 446	666 588	1 314 034	7.92
25–29	684 545	720 947	1 405 492	8.47
30–34	682 783	713 536	1 396 319	8.42
35–39	684 224	703 803	1 388 027	8.37
40–44	483 437	500 719	984 156	5.93
45–49	369 988	393 527	763 515	4.60
50–54	360 130	409 250	769 380	4.64
55–59	319 093	370 486	689 579	4.16
60–64	232 929	310 156	543 085	3.27
65–69	157 661	240 966	398 627	2.40
70–74	112 069	169 150	281 219	1.69
75–79	71 156	105 568	176 724	1.07
80+	60 839	103 740	164 579	0.99
Age group	Male	Female	Total	Percent
0–14	2 427 277	2 316 266	4 743 543	28.59
15–64	5 264 451	5 562 946	10 827 397	65.26
65+	401 725	619 424	1 021 149	6.15

=== Urbanization ===
Urban population: 39.4% of total population (2019)
Rate of urbanization: 7.8% annual rate of change (2008—2019)

View source data.

== Vital statistics ==
View source data.
View source data.
View source data.

=== UN estimates ===
Period	Population	Live births	Deaths	Natural change	CBR^{1}	CDR^{1}	NC^{1}	TFR^{1}	IMR^{1}	Life expectancy (years)
1950	4,380,000	209,000	107,000	102,000	47.7	24.4	23.3	6.63	172.5	38.94
1951	4,485,000	213,000	108,000	105,000	47.5	24.1	23.4	6.62	170.9	39.25
1952	4,593,000	218,000	110,000	109,000	47.5	23.9	23.6	6.63	168.9	39.51
1953	4,702,000	224,000	112,000	112,000	47.6	23.7	23.9	6.66	167.5	39.74
1954	4,814,000	230,000	112,000	117,000	47.7	23.3	24.4	6.69	165.1	40.22
1955	4,931,000	236,000	114,000	122,000	47.8	23.1	24.7	6.73	163.4	40.45
1956	5,052,000	241,000	115,000	126,000	47.8	22.8	24.9	6.75	160.8	40.77
1957	5,176,000	247,000	116,000	130,000	47.6	22.5	25.1	6.75	158.2	41.19
1958	5,298,000	245,000	117,000	128,000	46.2	22.0	24.2	6.57	155.6	41.52
1959	5,419,000	244,000	117,000	127,000	45.0	21.6	23.3	6.42	152.5	41.79
1960	5,542,000	242,000	116,000	126,000	43.7	21.0	22.7	6.25	149.5	42.36
1961	5,665,000	242,000	116,000	127,000	42.8	20.4	22.3	6.12	147.0	42.79
1962	5,789,000	242,000	115,000	127,000	41.9	19.9	22.0	6.00	144.3	43.32
1963	5,914,000	242,000	114,000	128,000	40.9	19.3	21.6	5.85	141.7	43.90
1964	6,041,000	248,000	114,000	134,000	41.0	18.9	22.1	5.86	139.2	44.40
1965	6,171,000	252,000	115,000	137,000	40.8	18.5	22.2	5.82	136.9	44.79
1966	6,299,000	255,000	114,000	141,000	40.5	18.1	22.4	5.77	134.6	45.36
1967	6,426,000	258,000	115,000	143,000	40.1	17.9	22.2	5.71	132.3	45.51
1968	6,553,000	261,000	116,000	145,000	39.8	17.7	22.1	5.65	130.1	45.79
1969	6,680,000	263,000	116,000	147,000	39.4	17.4	22.0	5.56	128.0	46.24
1970	6,709,000	277,000	154,000	123,000	40.7	22.6	18.1	5.72	126.3	39.13
1971	6,696,000	276,000	150,000	125,000	40.9	22.3	18.6	5.87	124.7	39.51
1972	6,766,000	283,000	148,000	136,000	41.7	21.7	20.0	5.99	121.9	40.22
1973	6,852,000	269,000	150,000	119,000	39.2	21.8	17.4	5.56	125.0	40.02
1974	6,913,000	240,000	150,000	90,000	34.6	21.6	13.0	4.80	126.9	39.80
1975	6,728,000	210,000	578,000	−368,000	31.2	85.7	−54.6	4.10	265.4	12.00
1976	6,307,000	175,000	548,000	−373,000	27.6	86.6	−58.9	3.41	173.1	12.01
1977	6,040,000	140,000	192,000	−52,000	23.1	31.7	−8.7	2.72	134.2	28.91
1978	5,961,000	171,000	136,000	35,000	28.4	22.6	5.8	3.34	131.2	36.98
1979	6,052,000	227,000	114,000	113,000	37.9	19.1	18.8	4.56	117.9	42.28
1980	6,199,000	301,000	104,000	198,000	48.0	16.5	31.5	5.77	115.8	47.57
1981	6,364,000	311,000	106,000	205,000	49.1	16.7	32.4	6.04	112.8	48.18
1982	6,620,000	333,000	109,000	224,000	50.3	16.5	33.9	6.19	109.4	48.74
1983	6,882,000	350,000	111,000	239,000	51.0	16.1	34.8	6.30	106.1	49.49
1984	7,134,000	367,000	113,000	254,000	51.3	15.7	35.6	6.34	102.7	50.24
1985	7,376,000	374,000	113,000	261,000	50.6	15.3	35.4	6.31	99.6	51.04
1986	7,661,000	380,000	114,000	266,000	49.7	14.9	34.8	6.23	96.7	51.51
1987	7,976,000	387,000	109,000	278,000	48.7	13.7	35.0	6.10	94.1	53.45
1988	8,270,000	393,000	109,000	284,000	47.5	13.2	34.3	5.94	91.2	54.28
1989	8,571,000	390,000	109,000	281,000	45.6	12.7	32.9	5.72	88.6	54.80
1990	8,911,000	398,000	109,000	289,000	44.8	12.2	32.5	5.64	86.2	55.43
1991	9,259,000	404,000	111,000	294,000	43.8	12.0	31.8	5.57	86.4	55.79
1992	9,718,000	406,000	113,000	294,000	42.4	11.8	30.6	5.45	86.4	56.02
1993	10,244,000	414,000	117,000	297,000	40.8	11.5	29.3	5.27	87.0	56.08
1994	10,636,000	411,000	121,000	290,000	38.6	11.4	27.3	5.05	88.3	56.04
1995	10,920,000	395,000	121,000	274,000	36.2	10.9	25.1	4.82	88.6	56.31
1996	11,183,000	377,000	121,000	256,000	33.7	10.4	22.9	4.87	89.0	56.35
1997	11,432,000	362,000	120,000	242,000	31.7	9.9	21.2	4.39	88.5	56.74
1998	11,669,000	343,000	118,000	225,000	30.4	9.5	20.8	4.13	87.2	57.03
1999	11,899,000	341,000	116,000	225,000	29.1	9.1	20.0	3.93	84.4	57.69
2000	12,119,000	334,000	112,000	222,000	28.5	8.7	19.8	3.79	79.9	58.63
2001	12,338,000	332,000	107,000	225,000	28.1	8.3	19.8	3.69	73.2	59.97
2002	12,562,000	332,000	102,000	230,000	27.5	7.9	19.6	3.57	66.4	61.23
2003	12,788,000	331,000	98,000	233,000	26.9	7.6	19.3	3.43	60.4	62.52
2004	13,016,000	332,000	95,000	237,000	26.3	7.3	19.0	3.31	55.3	63.55
2005	13,247,000	334,000	93,000	241,000	26.1	7.0	19.1	3.24	51.0	64.29
2006	13,478,000	336,000	92,000	244,000	26.1	6.8	19.3	3.17	47.4	65.06
2007	13,715,000	342,000	91,000	251,000	26.2	6.6	19.6	3.13	44.3	65.73
2008	13,944,000	341,000	90,000	252,000	25.9	6.5	19.4	3.05	41.3	66.47
2009	14,156,000	342,000	87,000	255,000	25.6	6.4	19.2	2.97	38.4	67.44
2010	14,364,000	340,000	88,000	252,000	25.0	6.3	18.8	2.86	35.7	67.71
2011	14,574,000	341,000	87,000	254,000	24.6	6.1	18.5	2.78	33.4	68.42
2012	14,787,000	345,000	87,000	258,000	24.6	6.1	18.5	2.75	31.0	68.92
2013	15,000,000	346,000	87,000	259,000	24.6	6.0	18.5	2.74	29.3	69.30
2014	15,211,000	347,000	88,000	259,000	24.4	6.0	18.4	2.59	27.8	69.74
2015	15,418,000	345,000	90,000	255,000	24.2	6.0	18.2	2.73	26.4	69.87
2016	15,625,000	342,000	90,000	252,000	24.0	6.0	17.9	2.72	25.3	70.22
2017	15,831,000	338,000	92,000	247,000	23.7	6.1	17.6	2.72	24.2	70.52
2018	16,025,000	334,000	94,000	240,000	23.4	6.1	17.2	2.72	23.3	70.56
2019	15,552,211(C)	329,000	97,000	233,000	23.0	6.2	16.8	2.72	22.4	70.69
2020	16,397,000	326,000	102,000	223,000	22.4	6.3	16.1	2.70	21.6	70.42
2021	16,589,000	321,000	114,000	207,000	21.9	6.8	15.1	2.66	20.8	69.58
2022					21.3	6.3	15.0	2.62		
2023					20.8	6.4	14.4	2.58		
2024					20.3	6.5	13.9	2.55		
2025					19.9	6.5	13.4	2.51		
^{1} CBR = crude birth rate (per 1000); CDR = crude death rate (per 1000); NC = natural change (per 1000); TFR = total fertility rate (number of children per woman); IMR = infant mortality rate per 1000 births

=== Fertility ===
The total fertility rate in Cambodia was 3.0 children per woman in 2010. The fertility rate was 4.0 children in 2000. Women in urban areas have 2.2 children on average, compared with 3.3 children per woman in rural areas. Fertility is highest in Mondol Kiri and Rattanak Kiri Provinces, where women have an average of 4.5 children, and lowest in Phnom Penh where women have an average of 2.0 children.

=== Demographic and Health Surveys ===
Total Fertility Rate (TFR) (Wanted Fertility Rate) and Crude Birth Rate (CBR):

Year	Total		Urban		Rural	
Year	CBR	TFR	CBR	TFR	CBR	TFR
1995–1998	29.0	4.11	25.0	3.31	29.0	4.25
2000	27.7	4.0 (3.1)	23.9	3.1 (2.5)	28.3	4.2 (3.2)
2005	25.6	3.4 (2.8)	23.8	2.8 (2.3)	25.9	3.5 (2.9)
2010	24.2	3.0 (2.6)	21.0	2.2 (2.0)	25.0	3.3 (2.8)
2014	22.0	2.7 (2.4)	20.2	2.1 (1.9)	22.4	2.9 (2.6)
2021–22	20.2	2.7 (2.4)	20.5	2.4 (2.2)	20.1	3.0 (2.7)

Total fertility rate per province in Cambodia in 2014

Total fertility rate and other related statistics by province, as of 2014:

Province	Total fertility rate	Percentage of women age 15-49 currently pregnant	Completed fertility rate (Average number of children born per woman in her lifetime)
Banteay Meanchey	2.8	5.2	4.0
Kampong Cham	3.3	3.5	3.9
Kampong Chhnang	2.4	5.4	4.2
Kampong Speu	2.4	6.3	4.1
Kampong Thom	2.9	5.8	4.4
Kandal	2.5	5.7	3.9
Kratié	3.6	7.3	4.5
Phnom Penh	2.0	4.6	2.8
Prey Veng	3.0	4.9	3.5
Pursat	3.1	5.9	4.0
Siem Reap	2.7	5.2	3.9
Svay Rieng	2.5	5.7	3.4
Takéo	2.4	3.9	3.7
Oddar Meanchey	3.0	8.5	4.6
Battambang/Pailin	2.9	5.5	3.8
Kampot/Kep	2.5	4.9	3.9
Sihanoukville/Koh Kong	2.7	5.8	4.1
Preah Vihear/Stung Treng	3.6	9.5	5.2
Mondulkiri/Ratanakiri	3.3	6.9	4.8

=== Infant and childhood mortality ===
Childhood mortality rates are decreasing in Cambodia. Currently, the infant mortality rate is 45 deaths per 1,000 live births for the five-year period before the survey compared with 66 deaths reported in the 2005 CDHS and 95 in the 2000 CDHS. Under-five mortality rates have also decreased from 124 deaths per 1,000 live births in 2000, 83 deaths in 2005 to 54 deaths per 1,000 in 2010.

Childhood mortality decreases markedly with mother's education and wealth. Infant mortality, for example, is twice as high among children whose mothers have no schooling compared to those with secondary or higher education (72 versus 31). The association with wealth is even stronger. There are 77 deaths per 1,000 live births among infants from the poorest households compared to only 23 deaths per 1,000 live births among infants from the richest households.

Mortality rates are much higher in rural than urban areas. Infant mortality, for example, is 64 deaths per 1,000 live births in rural areas compared to only 22 in urban areas. Mortality also differs by province. Infant mortality ranges from only 13 deaths per 1,000 live births in Phnom Penh to 78 deaths per 1,000 live births in Kampong Chhnang and Svay Rieng.

=== Life expectancy ===
Life expectancy in Cambodia

In 1959, life expectancy at birth was 44.2 years for males and 43.3 years for females. By 1970, life expectancy had increased by about 2.5 years since 1945. The greater longevity for females apparently reflected improved health practices during maternity and childbirth.

Period	Life expectancy in Years	Period	Life expectancy in Years
1950–1955	40.3	1985–1990	52.0
1955–1960	41.1	1990–1995	54.3
1960–1965	41.4	1995–2000	56.4
1965–1970	42.0	2000–2005	60.8
1970–1975	37.8	2005–2010	65.1
1975–1980	14.5	2010–2015	67.6
1980–1985	52.0		

Source: UN World Population Prospects

== Ethnic groups ==
An ethnic map of Cambodia from 1972.

The largest of the ethnic groups in Cambodia are the Khmer, who comprise 95.8% of the total population in 2019 and primarily inhabit the lowland Mekong sub region and the central plains.

The Khmer historically have lived near the lower Mekong River in a contiguous arc that runs from the southern Khorat Plateau where modern-day Thailand, Laos and Cambodia meet in the northeast, stretching southwest through the lands surrounding Tonle Sap lake to the Cardamom Mountains, then continues back southeast to the mouth of the Mekong River in southeastern Vietnam.

Ethnic groups in Cambodia other than the politically and socially dominant Khmer are classified as either "indigenous ethnic minorities" or "non-indigenous ethnic minorities". The indigenous ethnic minorities, more commonly collectively referred to as the Khmer Loeu ("upland Khmer"), constitute the majority in the remote mountainous provinces of Ratanakiri, Mondulkiri and Stung Treng and are present in substantial numbers in Kratie Province.

Approximately 17-21 separate ethnic groups, most of whom speak Austroasiatic languages related to Khmer, are included in the Khmer Loeu designation, including the Kuy and Tampuan people. These peoples are considered by the Khmer to be the aboriginal inhabitants of the land. Two of these highland groups, the Rade and the Jarai, are Chamic peoples who speak Austronesian languages descended from ancient Cham. These indigenous ethnic minorities haven't integrated into Khmer culture and follow their traditional animist beliefs.

Population of Cambodia according to ethnic group
Ethnic group	Census 1998		Census 2008		Census 2019	
Ethnic group	Number	%	Number	%	Number	%
Khmer	10,942,066	96.7	12,901,447	96.3	14,893,134	95.8
Indigenous ethnic minorities	276,081	2.4	383,273	2.9	448,282	2.9
Cham			179,193	1.52	272,217	1.77
Bunong			37,507	0.28	36,585	0.24
Tampuan			31,013	0.23	36,373	0.23
Kuy			28,612	0.21	16,762	0.11
Jarai			26,335	0.20	26,922	0.17
Kreung			19,988	0.15	21,453	0.14
Brao			9,025	0.07	10,086	0.06
Stieng			6,541	0.05	4,908	0.03
Kavet			6,218	0.05	7,569	0.05
Kraol			4,202	0.03	5,630	0.04
Pear			1,827	0.01	944	0.01
Ro Ong			1,831	0.01	573	0.00
Mel			1,697	0.01	984	0.01
Thmoon			865	0.01	1,164	0.01
Suoy			857	0.01	775	0.00
Khogn			743	0.01	109	0.00
Klueng			702	0.00	413	0.00
Kchruk			408	0.00	266	0.00
Sa'och			445	0.00	209	0.00
Ta Mun			400	0.00		
Lon			327	0.00	1,033	0.01
K'nuh			56	0.00		
Mon			19	0.00	27	0.00
Rade			21	0.00	179	0.00
Kchak			10	0.00	16	0.00
K'jah			5	0.00		
Chinese	26,721	0.2	6,530	0.05	94,450	0.6
Vietnamese	140,328	1.2	72,775	0.5	78,090	0.5
Lao	28,854	0.2	18,515	0.1	13,636	0.1
Thai	2,482	0.02	2,458	0.02	6,650	0.04
Other	25,124	0.2	10,684	0.1	17,769	0.1
Total	11,437,656		13,395,682		15,552,211	

The non-indigenous ethnic minorities include immigrants and their descendants who live among the Khmer and have adopted, at least nominally, Khmer culture and language. The three groups most often included are the Chinese Cambodians, Vietnamese and Cham peoples. The Chinese have immigrated to Cambodia from different regions of China throughout Cambodia's history, integrating into Cambodian society and today Chinese Cambodians or Cambodians of mixed Sino-Khmer ancestry dominate the business community, politics and the media. The Cham are descendants of refugees from the various wars of the historical kingdom of Champa. The Cham live amongst the Khmer in the central plains but in contrast to the Khmer who are Theravada Buddhists, the vast majority of Cham follow Islam.

There are also small numbers of other minority groups. Tai peoples in Cambodia include the Lao along the Mekong at the northeast border, Thai (urban and rural), and the culturally Burmese Kola, who have visibly influenced the culture of Pailin Province. Even smaller numbers of recent Hmong immigrants reside along the Lao border and various Burmese peoples have immigrated to the capital, Phnom Penh.

== Languages ==
Languages of Cambodia
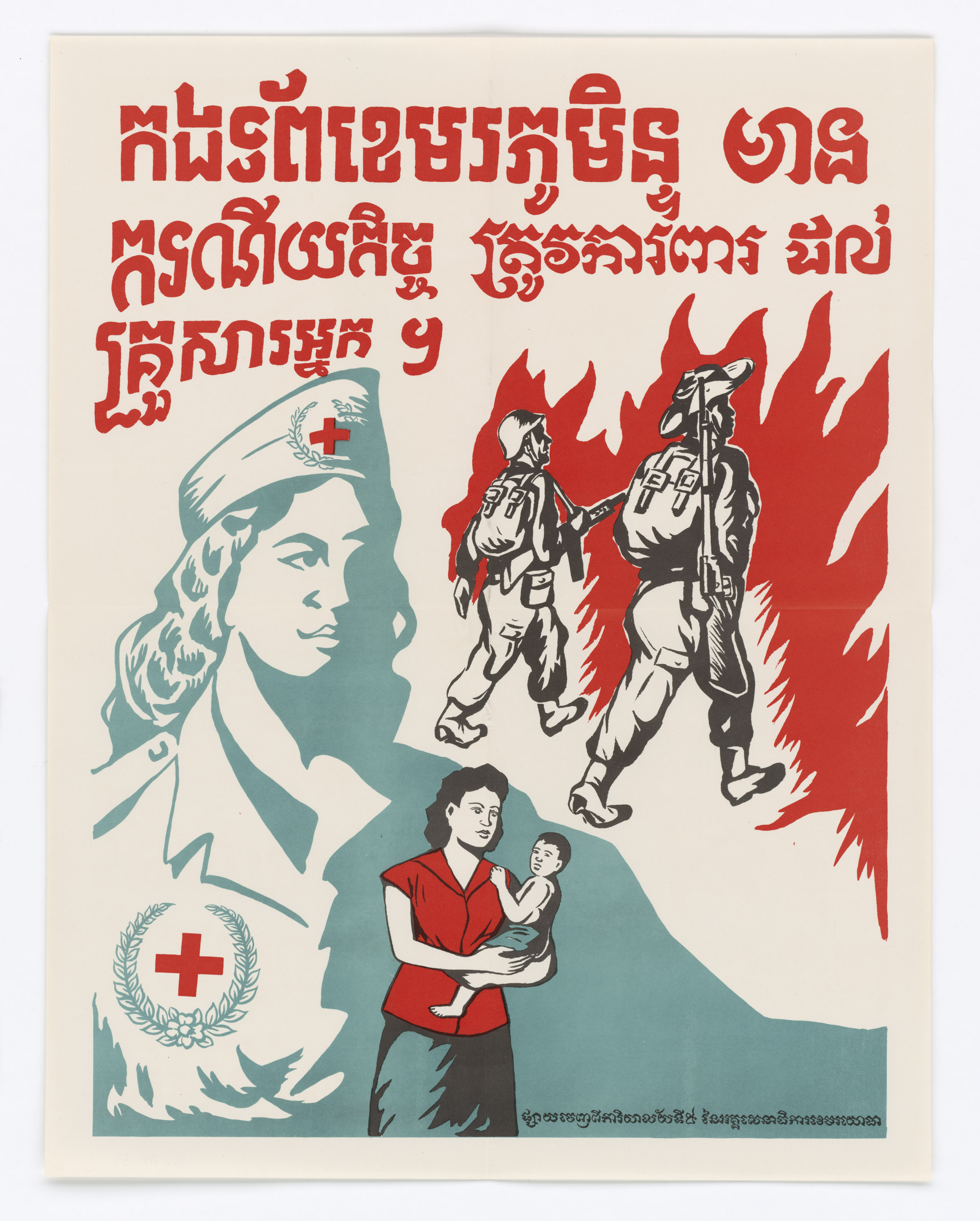
- Poster in Khmer, 1954
- Official: Khmer
- Main: Khmer
- Minority: Kuy; Por; Somray; Chong; Suoy; Sa'och; Tampuan; Kaco'; Stieng; Mnong; Brao; Krung; Sou
- Foreign: English; French
- Signed: Cambodian Sign Language
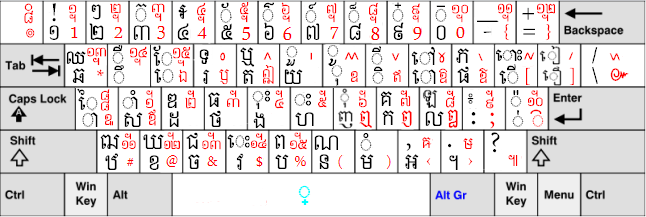
- Keyboard layout: Khmer keyboard

Official language

Khmer is an Austroasiatic language spoken by over 90% of the Cambodian population. The vast majority of Khmer speakers use the Central Khmer dialect. Central Khmer is the variety spoken in the central plain where the ethnic Khmers most heavily concentrate. Other Khmer dialects include the Phnom Penh variety, as well as Northern Khmer (Surin Khmer), Western Khmer (Cardamom Khmer), Southern Khmer (Khmer Krom), and the Khmer Khe dialect in Stung Treng province.

The Northern Khmer dialect is also spoken by over a million Khmers in the southern regions of Northeast Thailand. Western Khmer displays features of the Middle Khmer language, and is considered a conservative dialect. Southern Khmer is the first language of the Khmer Krom people in the Mekong Delta region in Vietnam.

Minority languages

According to Glottolog, 22 languages other than Khmer are spoken in Cambodia, most of which are also Austroasiatic languages. Other Austroasiatic languages of Cambodia include Kuy, Por (Pear), Somray, Chong, Suoy, Sa'och, Tampuan, Kaco', Stieng, Mnong, Brao, Krung (Rade), and Sou (Laven).

Many of these languages are also spoken in Vietnam. Vietnamese itself is also spoken in parts of Cambodia. Non-Austroasiatic minority languages of Cambodia include Cham, and Jarai, (Austronesian) as well as Thai and Lao (Tai-Kadai).

Languages of education

English and French are used to different extents in education.

Sign language

- Cambodian Sign Language

== Religions ==
Religion in Cambodia
Religion	percent
Theravada Buddhism	95.5%
Mahayana Buddhism	1.6%
Islam	2.0%
Christianity	0.3%
Others	0.5%

Buddhism: 97.1%, Islam: 2.0%, Christianity: 0.3%, Others: 0.5%

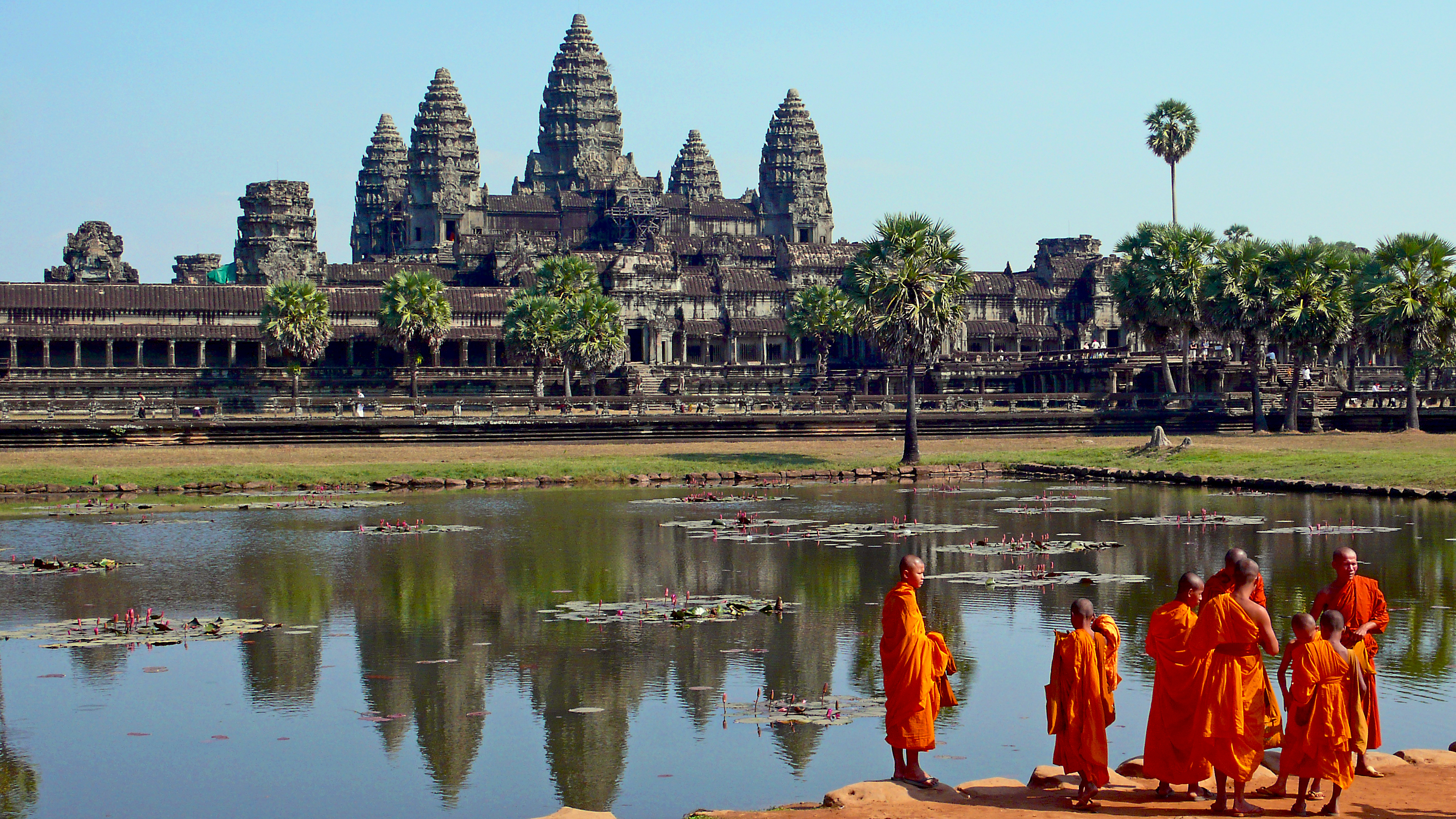
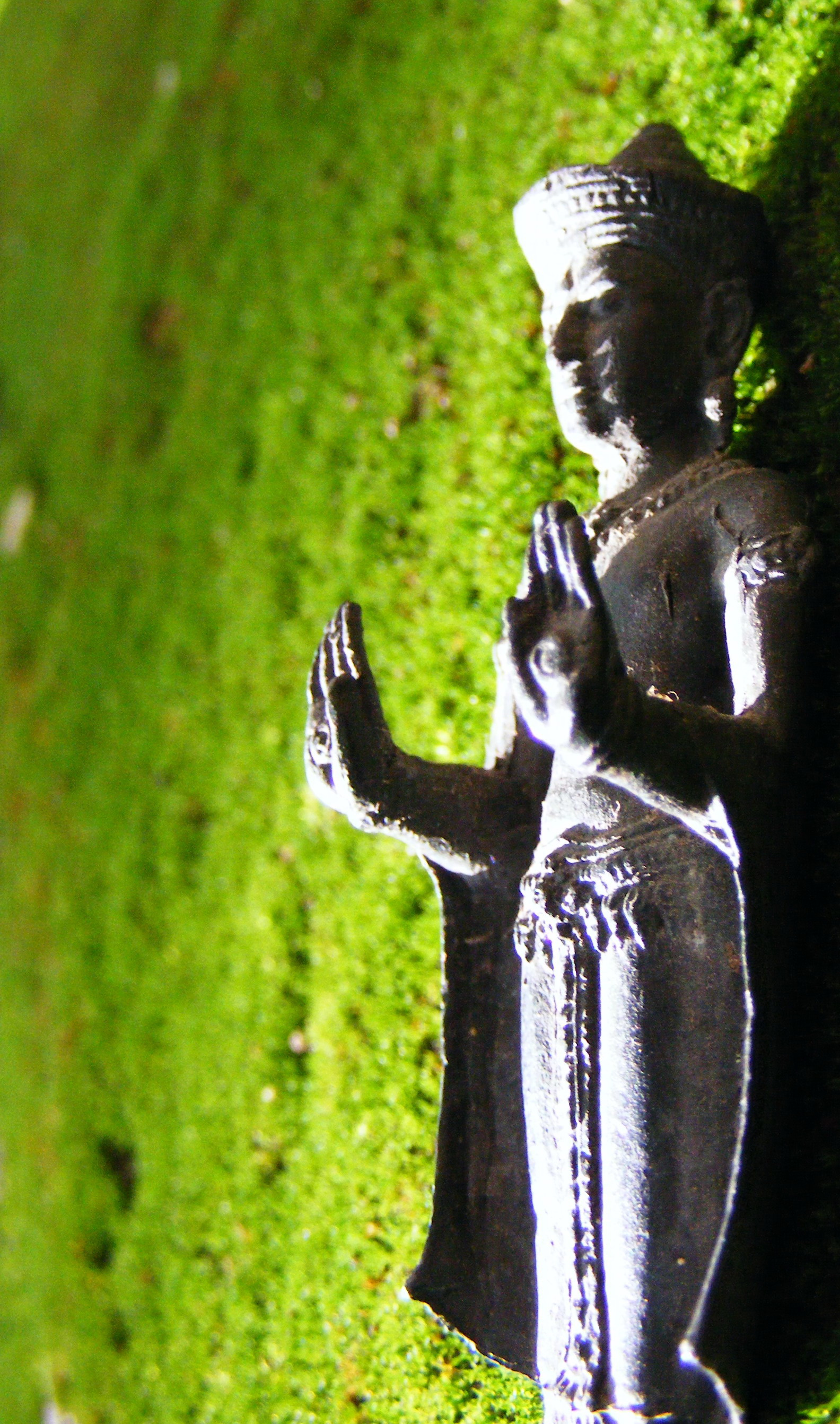

== Emigration ==
Countries with notable populations of Cambodians are:

- Thailand
- Vietnam
- United States
- France
- Malaysia
- Australia
- Canada
- New Zealand
- China
- Hong Kong
- United Kingdom
- Laos
- Singapore
- Switzerland
- South Korea
- Japan
