= Languages of Thailand =

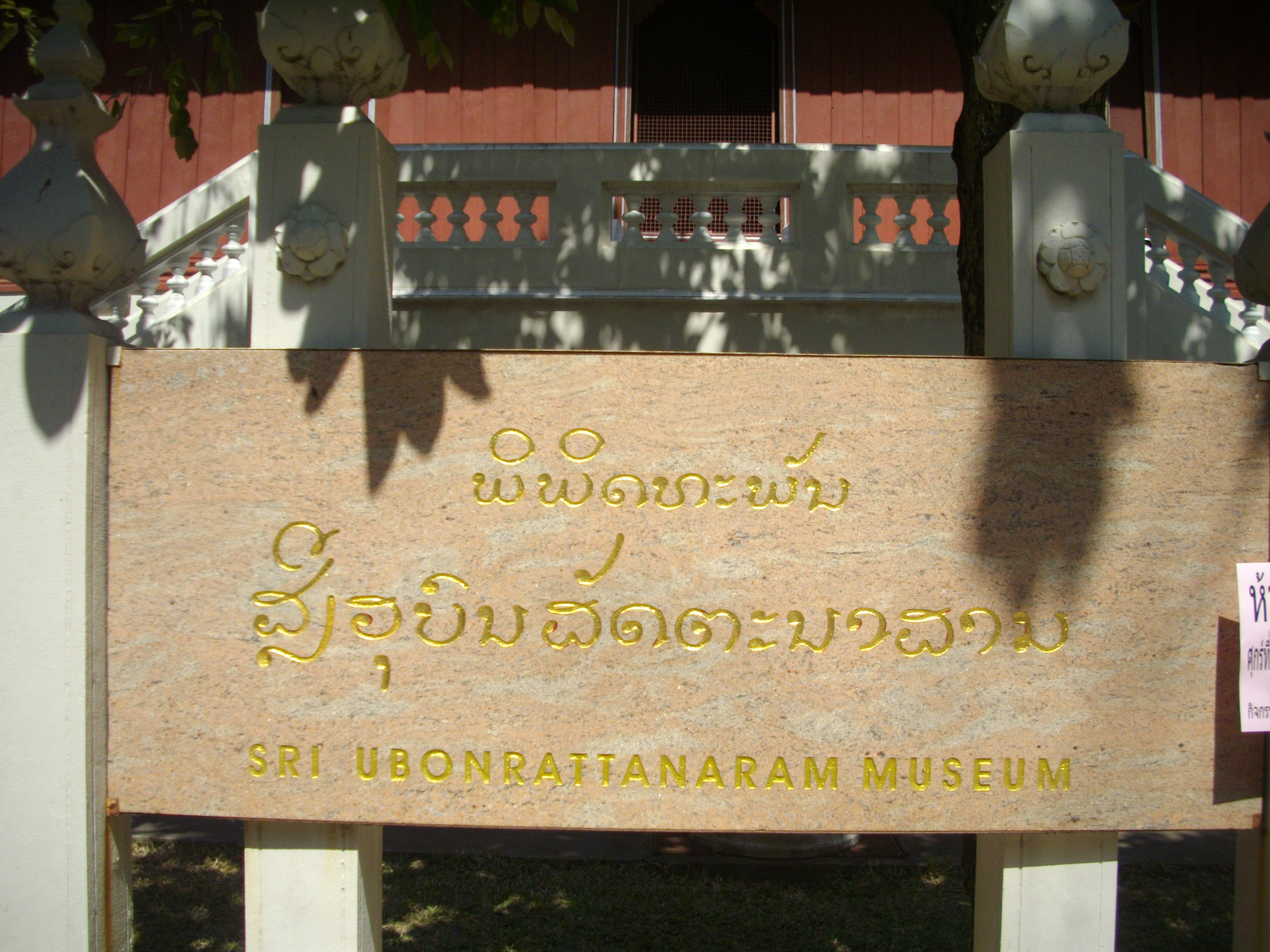
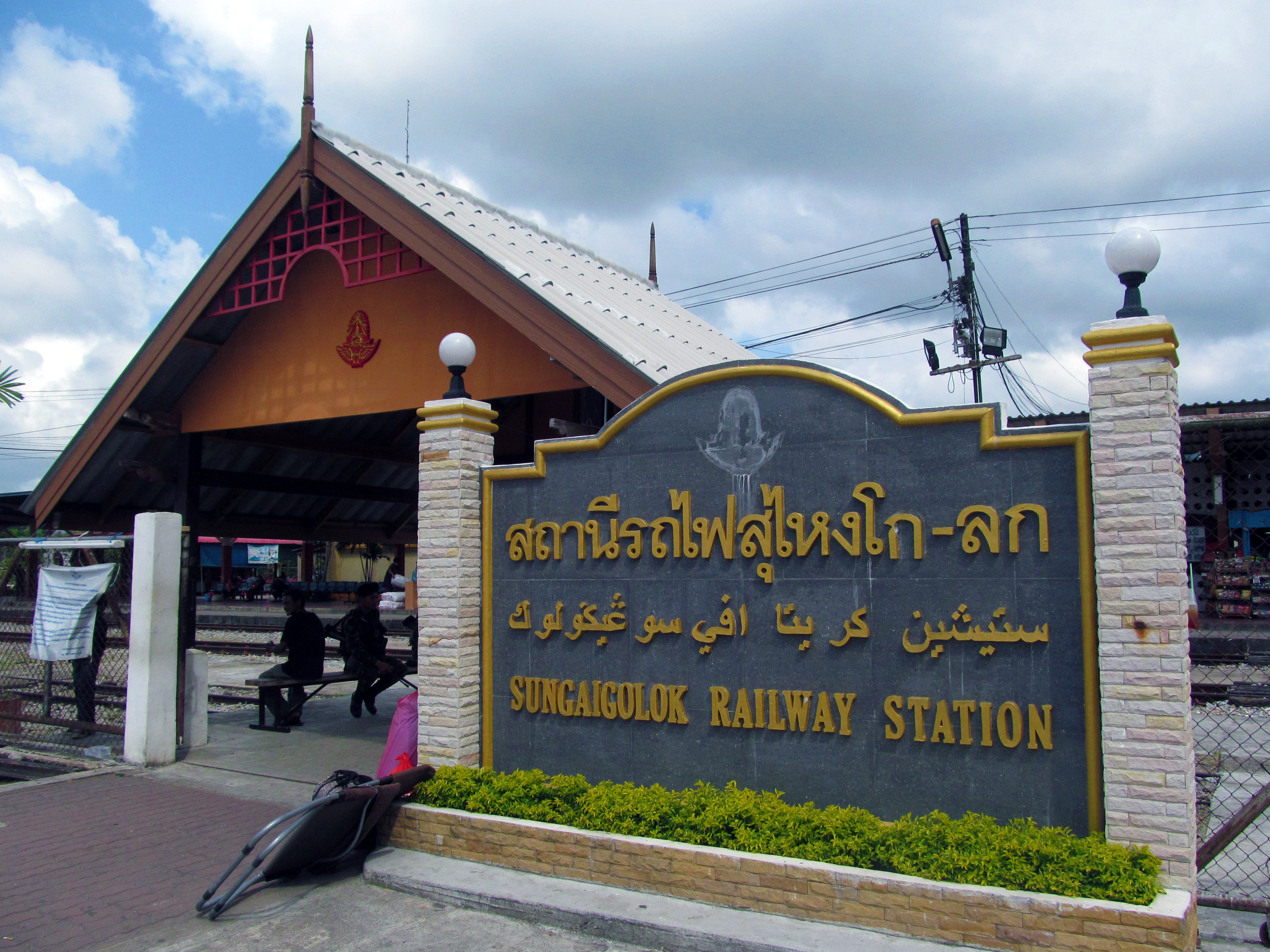
- At Wat Phra Kaew, Chiang Rai At Wat Si Ubon, Ubon Ratchathani At Sungai Kolok Station, Narathiwat At Ganesha Shrine in Huai Khwang, Bangkok Various signs in Thailand with different languages (left to right and top to bottom) Northern Thai (in Tai Tham), Thai, and English; Isan (in Tai Noi) and English; Thai, Malay (in Jawi), and English; Thai, English, and Chinese
- Official: Central Thai (96% L1+L2)
- Vernacular: Central Thai (40% L1), Isan (33% L1), Northern Thai (11% L1), Southern Thai (9% L1)
- Minority: Akha; Chong; Hakka; Hmong; Iu Mien; Kaloeng; Karenics (Red Karen (Eastern Kayah) * S'gaw Karen); Kensiu; Khmer (Northern * Western); Khmu; Kuy; Lahu; Lisu; Mal; Malay (Pattani Malay * Satun Malay * Bangkok Malay * Songkhla Malay); Mandarin (Southwestern); Min (Teochew * Hokkien * Hainanese * Hokchew); Mon; Nyah Kur; Phu Thai; Phuan; Pwos (Eastern * Northern * Phrae); Shan; Tai Lue; Thai Song; Urak Lawoi’; Vietnamese; Yoy; Bisu; Blang; Bru; Cham; Gong; Hani; Jahai; Jingpho; Kasong; Khün; Kintaq; Lamet; Lao Nyo; Lawa; Mlabri; Mok; Moklenic (Moken * Moklen); Mpi; Nuosu; Palaung; Phunoi; Prai; Saek; Samre; Sa'och; Tai Dam; Tai Nuea; Tai Ya; Tai Yo; Ten'edn; Thavung; Wa; Yong; Yue Chinese (Cantonese * Goulou Yue)
- Immigrant: Burmese; English; Russian
- Foreign: Arabic; Burmese; Standard Chinese; English; Hindi; Japanese; Khmer; Lao; Malay (Indonesian * Malaysian); Vietnamese
- Signed: Ban Khor Sign Language, Chiangmai Sign Language, Old Bangkok Sign Language, Thai Sign Language
- Keyboard layout: Kedmanee layout

Thailand is home to 51 living indigenous languages and 24 living non-indigenous languages, with the majority of people speaking languages of the Southwestern Tai family, and the national language being Central Thai. Lao is spoken along the border with the Lao PDR; Karen languages are spoken along the border with Myanmar; Khmer is spoken near Cambodia; and Malay is spoken in the south near Malaysia. Sixty-two 'domestic' languages are officially recognized, and international languages spoken in Thailand, primarily by international workers, expatriates and businesspeople, include Burmese, Karen, English, Chinese, Japanese, and Vietnamese, among others.

== Officially recognized languages ==
=== National breakdown ===
The following table comprises all 62 ethnolinguistic groups recognized by the Royal Thai Government in the 2011 Country Report to the UN Committee responsible for the International Convention on the Elimination of All Forms of Racial Discrimination, available from the Department of Rights and Liberties Promotion of the Thai Ministry of Justice.

Five language families of Thailand recognized by the Royal Thai Government
Kra–Dai	Austroasiatic	Sino-Tibetan	Austronesian	Hmong-Mien
24 Groups	22 Groups	11 Groups	3 Groups	2 Groups
Kaloeng	Kasong	Guong (Ugong)	Malay (Malayu / Nayu / Yawi)	Hmong (Meo)
Northern Thai	Kuy / Kuay	Karen (7 subfamilies)	Moken / Moklen	Mien (Yao)
Tai Dam	Khmu	S'gaw Karen	Urak Lawoi'	
Nyaw	Thailand Khmer, Northern Khmer	Pwo Karen		
Khün	Chong	Kaya Karen		
Central Thai	Sa'och	Bwe Karen		
Thai Korat	Kensiu	Pa'O		
Thai Takbai	Samre	Padaung Karen		
Thai Loei	Thavung	Kayo Karen		
Tai Lue	So	Jingpaw / Kachin		
Tai Ya	Nyah Kur (Chaobon)	Chinese		
Shan	Nyeu	Yunnanese Chinese		
Southern Thai	Bru (Kha)	Bisu		
Phu Thai	Blang (Samtao)	Burmese		
Phuan	Palaung (Dala-ang)	Lahu (Muzur)		
Yong	Mon	Lisu		
Yoy	Lawa	Akha		
Lao Khrang	Mlabri (Tongluang)	Mpi		
Lao Ngaew	Lamet (Lua)			
Lao Ti	Lavua (Lawa / Lua)			
Lao Wiang/Lao Klang	Wa			
Lao Lom	Vietnamese			
Isan				
Saek				

=== Regional breakdown ===
Regional language data is limited. The following table shows all the language families of Northeast Thailand, as recognized in the report which is the source for the national breakdown.

Language families of Northeast Thailand
Tai Language Family	Persons	Austroasiatic Language Family	Persons
Lao Esan / Thai Lao	13,000,000	Thailand Khmer / Northern Khmer	1,400,000
Central Thai	800,000	Kuy / Kuay (Suay)	400,000
Thai Khorat / Tai Beung / Tai Deung	600,000	So	70,000
Thai-Loei	500,000	Bru	combined
Phu Thai	500,000	Vietnamese	20,000
Ngaw	500,000	Nyeu	10,000
Kaleung	200,000 for	Nyah Kur / Chao Bon / Khon Dong	7,000
Yoy	Kaleung, Yoy and Phuan	So (Thavaung)	1,500
Phuan	combined	Mon	1,000
Tai-dam (Song)	(not specified)		
Total:	16,103,000	Total:	1,909,000
Cannot specify ethnicity and amount:			3,288,000
			21,300,000

Note that numbers of speakers are for the Northeast region only. Languages may have additional speakers outside the Northeast.

=== Provincial breakdown ===
Provincial-level language data is limited; those interested are directed to the Ethnolinguistic Maps of Thailand resource, or to the Ethnologue Thailand country report.

Khmer speakers as a percentage of the total population in various provinces of Thailand
Province	Khmer % in 1990	Khmer % in 2000
Buriram	0.3%	27.6%
Chanthaburi	0.6%	1.6%
Maha Sarakham	0.2%	0.3%
Roi Et	0.4%	0.5%
Sa Kaew	—N/a	1.9%
Sisaket	30.2%	26.2%
Surin	63.4%	47.2%
Trat	0.4%	2.1%
Ubon Ratchathani	0.8%	0.3%

== Topolects ==
The sole official language of Thailand is Central Thai (Siamese), a vernacular language in Central (including the Bangkok Metropolitan Region), Southwestern, and Eastern Thailand, along with Thai Chinese ethnic enclaves in outer parts of the country such as Hatyai, Bandon, Betong, Nangrong, Mueang Buriram, Mueang Khonkaen, Mueang Udonthani, and recently luxury housing estates in Hangdong. Central Thai is a Kra–Dai language closely related to Lao, Shan, and numerous indigenous languages of Southern China and Northern Vietnam. It is the sole language of government and education (however, international schools use English, and Yunnanese schools in Maesai use Mandarin). Technically, although almost all Thai nationals are Central Thai native speakers, the Krungthep dialect is usually used as a courtesy when speaking to strangers, even if all parties share a same (non-Central Thai) primary language; however, less than half of the population claim to use Central Thai as their vernacular language. Standard Thai is written in the Thai alphabet, an abugida that evolved from the Khmer script.

Thai has several topolects (variations). Central Thai and Southern Thai are successors of the Sukhothai language, which divided during the 17th century, and are mutually intelligible (like English and Scots). Northern Thai is spoken in the northern provinces that were formerly part of the independent kingdom of Lan Na, while Isan (a Thai variant of Lao) and Phu Thai are native languages of the northeast. These languages are partially mutually intelligible with Central Thai, with the degree depending on standard sociolinguistic factors, Central Thai and the Isan have limited mutual intelligibility, much like English and German. Although most linguists classify all these as separate languages, the Thai government has historically treated them as dialects of Thai to build Thai national identity. In the 2010 national census, no declared language option was given besides Thai.

Since the Thai government and Royal Society treat the topolects as dialects, the varieties of Central Thai itself are downplay and disregarded; however, local Central Thai accent discrimination still occurs and is called a ner (Thai: เหน่อ). Central Thai itself technically has six varieties, as follows:

1. Krungthep accent – Traditionally, this accent has been associated with the Teochews settlers (Krungthepians, Padreewian, Chonburian, Photaramian-Banpongs, Hatyais, Mueang Khonkaens etcs.), who experienced language purge in the early 20th century to Central Thai through the Thai education system. Due to insufficient contact with the Rattanakosin speakers, this led to the uniqueness of both its pronunciation and its colloquial form. However, at present the situation has reversed (Thaification) and the dialect now carries the highest social prestige and cultural imperialism as of the late 20th century.
  Same stereotype to the Received Pronunciation in United Kingdom, the accent was formed by sociolinguistics rather than dialect continuum, is the sole accent found scattered and hegemony throughout the country, the claim that the Krungthep accent is non-regional is still disputed, since the term Krungthep refers absolutely to Bangkok CBD, the homeland of Teochews, however, sub-varieties in Bandon and Hatyai districts, which incorporate many Southern Thai features, the dialect are known as Laeng Kha Luang (Southern Thai: แหลงข้าหลวง, literally: Official Pronunciation).
  An estimated 10% of Thais speak with this accent. Notable speakers with a proper Krungthep accent who are not Thai Chinese include Theerathon Bunmathan, Teerasil Dangda, Siwarak Tedsungnoen, Kiatisuk Senamuang (however, they all grew up in Thai Chinese communities). Due to the low number of internal migrats, Mueang Chon is known as the district with the highest percentage of its population speaking the Krungthep accent.
2. Rattanakosin accent – An authentic accent of the Bangkok periphery that was used in mainstream media, however, the situation has reversed in late 20th century when this accent was downgraded to lower prestige, and is now referred to as 'fresh market' or 'janitor' accent, and the prestige accent was replaced by Krungthep accent. The term Rattanakosin here refers to the Rattanakosin era, during which this accent was prevalent, not to the Rattanakosin Island. The Royal Society registers phonology on this accent.
  The Rattanakosin accent was once part of the Ayutthaya dialect, as evident in the standard Thai media during the era of Field Marshal Plaek Phibunsongkhram's government (mid-20th century). As Bangkok expanded rapidly after the 1980s, Krungthepians migrated to the surrounding areas, which influence the locals into their dialect. Today, the Krungthep and Rattanakosin accents are concerned only with matters of pronunciation; in other aspects of Central Thai, such as vocabulary, grammar, and style, both follow the Krungthepian features. Despite these two matters of pronunciation have big differences, the Royal Society looking further downplay as the same dialect called Krungthep dialect, mainly for nation harmony). (Note: Of the nine primary vowels, only /i/ is pronounced the same way, the remaining eight vowel sounds (/a/ is [ɐ]~[a], /e/ is [ɪ]~[e], /ɛ/ is [æ]~[ɛ], /o/ is [o̞ʊ]~[o], /ɔ/ is [ʌ]~[ɔ], /u/ is [ʊ]~[u], /ɯ/ is [ɨ]~[ɯ] and /ɤ/ [ə]~[ɤ]) are allophone of the same phonemes, left is Krungthep accent, right is Rattanakosin accent. In syllable-final consonants, the semivowel of [j] is shift to [ɪ], and [w] is shift to [ʊ] in Krungthep accent. Rattanakosin accent have 21 initial consonants phonemes, while Krungthep accent have 28 phonemes)
  Recently, the only Thai Prime Minister to speak with a Rattanakosin accent is Surayud Chulanont. With the other exception of Yingluck Shinawatra, who speaks with a Chiang Mai accent (Northern Thai language), all other Prime Ministers are Thai Chinese and have spoken with a Krungthep accent. Notable Rattanakosin speakers such as Panadda Wongphudee, Pongsuk Hiranprueck, or Suchadee Maneewong
3. Ayutthaya era dialect (remnant) – This dialect is spoken in most part of lower Central Thailand, Kanchanaburi, Rayong, Chanthaburi, and Trat provinces. The city of Ayutthaya was rebuilt during the reign of King Mongkut, and today the Rattanakosin accent is primarily used. The Suphanburi accent has most preserved its identity from the Ayutthaya era.
4. Northern Cities dialect – A dialect continuum with the Northern Thai language, spoken in upper Central Thailand (Northern Cities) and part of Uttaradit province.
5. Southwestern dialect – A dialect continuum with the Southern Thai language, spoken from Mueang Prachuap district to most parts of Ratchaburi province.
6. Khorat dialect – A mixed form of speech in which Central Thai and Laotian elements and structures are combined arbitrarily.

The Krungthep, Rattanakosin, and Suphanburi accents can be compared to the English accents of Received Pronunciation, Cockney and Scouse.

== Minority languages ==
The position of all minority languages, including the largest (e.g. Isan in the Northeast and Kham Muang in the North), is precarious given that they are not well-supported in Thailand's language education policy. In the far south, Kelantan-Pattani Malay, also known as Yawi, is the primary community language of the Malay Muslims. Khmer is spoken by older Northern Khmer. Varieties of Chinese are also spoken by the older Thai Chinese population, with the Teochew dialect being best represented. However, the younger Thai Chinese and Northern Khmer trend toward speaking Central Thai. The Peranakan in Southern Thailand speak Southern Thai at home.

== Sign languages ==
Several village sign languages are reported among the mountain peoples ('hill tribes'), though it is not clear whether these are independent languages, as only Ban Khor Sign Language has been described. Two related deaf-community sign languages developed in Chiangmai and Bangkok; the national Thai Sign Language developed from these under the influence of American Sign Language.

== Endangerment status of languages ==
The 2014 Ethnologue country report for Thailand, which uses the EGIDS language endangerment assessment scale, lists one national language (Central Thai), one educational language (Isan), 27 developing languages, 18 vigorous languages, 17 threatened languages, and 7 dying languages.

== Most widely spoken languages ==
=== ICERD 2011 country report data ===
The following table shows ethnolinguistic groups in Thailand with equal to or more than 400,000 speakers according to the Royal Thai Government's 2011 Country Report to the Committee Responsible for the International Convention on the Elimination of All Forms of Racial Discrimination (ICERD).^{:99} and the Ethnolinguistic Maps of Thailand project. Note that the degree to which language speakers will have shifted in their idiolects towards Central Thai will depend on standard sociolinguistic factors, like age, education, gender, and proximity to an urban center.

Ethnolinguistic groups of Thailand with equal to or more than 400,000 speakers^{:99}

Language	Speakers	Language Family
Central Thai	20.0 million	Tai-Kadai
Isan	15.2 million	Tai-Kadai
Kham Muang (Northern Thai)	6.0 million	Tai-Kadai
Pak Tai (Southern Thai)	4.5 million	Tai-Kadai
Northern Khmer	1.4 million	Austroasiatic
Yawi (Pattani Malay)	1.4 million	Austronesian
Ngaw	0.5 million	Tai-Kadai
Phu Thai	0.5 million	Tai-Kadai
Karen	0.4 million	Sino-Tibetan
Kuy	0.4 million	Austroasiatic

=== Ethnologue data ===
The figures in the following table are for first language speakers, following Ethnologue. Note that Ethnologue describes 'Isan' as 'Northeastern Thai', following Thai government practice until the 2011 Country Report.

Languages by number of speakers in Thailand with more than 400,000 speakers (with Expanded Graded Intergenerational Disruption Scale)

Family	Language	ISO	Speakers	Status (EGIDS)^{[a]}	Notes
Tai-Kadai	Central Thai	th	20.2 million	1 (National)	
Tai-Kadai	Northeastern Thai	tts	15.0 million	3 (Wider Communication)	
Tai-Kadai	Northern Thai	nod	6.0 million	4 (Educational)	
Tai-Kadai	Southern Thai	sou	4.5 million	5 (Developing)	
Tai-Kadai	Phu Thai	pht	0.5 million	6a (Vigorous)	
Austroasiatic	Northern Khmer	kmx	1.4 million	5 (Developing)	
Austronesian	Yawi	mfa	1.1 million	5 (Developing)	
Sino-Tibetan	Burmese	my	0.8 million		Non-indigenous

aExpanded Graded Intergenerational Disruption Scale (EGIDS) of Ethnologue:
0 (International): "The language is widely used between nations in trade, knowledge exchange, and international policy."
1 (National): "The language is used in education, work, mass media, and government at the national level."
2 (Provincial): "The language is used in education, work, mass media, and government within major administrative subdivisions of a nation."
3 (Wider Communication): "The language is used in work and mass media without official status to transcend language differences across a region."
4 (Educational): "The language is in vigorous use, with standardization and literature being sustained through a widespread system of institutionally supported education."
5 (Developing): "The language is in vigorous use, with literature in a standardized form being used by some though this is not yet widespread or sustainable."
6a (Vigorous): "The language is used for face-to-face communication by all generations and the situation is sustainable."
6b (Threatened): "The language is used for face-to-face communication within all generations, but it is losing users."
7 (Shifting): "The child-bearing generation can use the language among themselves, but it is not being transmitted to children."
8a (Moribund): "The only remaining active users of the language are members of the grandparent generation and older."
8b (Nearly Extinct): "The only remaining users of the language are members of the grandparent generation or older who have little opportunity to use the language."
9 (Dormant): "The language serves as a reminder of heritage identity for an ethnic community, but no one has more than symbolic proficiency."
10 (Extinct): "The language is no longer used and no one retains a sense of ethnic identity associated with the language."

=== Census data ===
The following table employs 2000 census data and includes international languages. Caution should be exercised with Thai census data on first language. In Thai censuses, the four largest Tai-Kadai languages of Thailand (in order, Central Thai, Isan (majority Lao), Kam Mueang, Pak Tai) are not provided as options for language or ethnic group. People stating such a language as a first language, including Lao, are allocated to 'Thai'. This explains the disparity between the three tables in this section. For instance, self-reporting as Lao has been prohibited, due to the prohibition of the Lao ethnonym in the context of describing Thai citizens, for approximately one hundred years. The 2011 Country Report data is therefore more comprehensive in that it differentiates between the four largest Tai-Kadai languages of Thailand and between languages described as 'local languages' and 'dialects and others' in the census.

Population of Thailand by language
Language	Language family	No. of speakers (2000)*	No. of speakers (2010)
Thai	Tai-Kadai	52,325,037	59,866,190
Khmer	Austroasiatic	1,291,024	180,533
Malay	Austronesian	1,202,911	1,467,369
Karen	Sino-Tibetan	317,968	441,114
Chinese	Sino-Tibetan	231,350	111,866
Miao	Hmong-Mien	112,686	149,090
Lahu	Sino-Tibetan	70,058	-
Burmese	Sino-Tibetan	67,061	827,713
Akha	Sino-Tibetan	54,241	-
English	Indo-European	48,202	323,779
Tai	Tai-Kadai	44,004	787,696
Japanese	Japonic	38,565	70,667
Lawa	Austroasiatic	31,583	-
Lisu	Sino-Tibetan	25,037	-
Vietnamese	Austroasiatic	24,476	8,281
Yao	Hmong-Mien	21,238	-
Khmu	Austroasiatic	6,246	-
Indian	Indo-European	5,598	22,938
Haw Yunnanese	Sino-Tibetan	3,247	-
Htin	Austroasiatic	2,317	-
Local languages		-	958,251
Dialect and others in Thailand		33,481	318,012
Others		33,481	448,160
Unknown		325,134	-
Total:		56,281,538	65,981,659

* Above the age of five

== Language education policy ==
Thai is the language of education. The curriculum introduced by the 1999 National Education Act, which introduced 12 years of free education, emphasized Thai as being the national language. The 2008 Basic Education Core Curriculum prioritises Thai, although it also mentions 'dialects' and 'local languages', i.e., ethnic minority languages. The monolingual education system is generally seen as ineffective, with one-third of teenagers functionally illiterate. Illiteracy in Thai is particularly widespread in Thailand's three southernmost provinces as the Patani dialect of Malay is the mother tongue for the majority Malay community. International programs and schools which teach, for example, English or Chinese alongside Thai exist, as do a small number of pilot projects to teach ethnic minority languages alongside Thai in Thai schools.

== See also ==
- Demographics of Thailand
- Ethnic minorities of Thailand
- Kra–Dai languages
- Nationality, religion, and language data for the provinces of Thailand
- Southwestern Tai languages
- Thai language
