= Pearic =

Pearic may refer to:

- Pearic languages, Austroasiatic languages of Cambodia and Thailand
- Pearic peoples, people speaking these languages
