= Pear people =

Ethnic group indigenous to western Cambodia

Pear
Samre

Regions with significant populations
- Cambodia: 1,830

Languages
- Pear, Khmer

Religion
- Animist, Theravada Buddhism

Related ethnic groups
- Sa'och, Chong

The Pear or Por (Khmer: ព័រ), also known as the Samre, are an ethnic group indigenous to western Cambodia. They reside in Preah Vihear province (Rovieng District), and Battambang province (Samlout District), with the majority living in Pursat province, specifically in Phnum Kravanh district and Veal Veng district. In Phnum Kravanh, their population totals approximately 1,024 individuals, while Veal Veng is home to around 224 Pear people.

Within Pursat, this community refers to themselves as "Samre". Originally living in mountainous regions, the Pear people gradually migrated to the foothills near water sources, primarily for cultivating cardamom plants.

== See also ==
- Pearic peoples
