= PWW =

PWW may refer to:

- Pollokshaws West railway station, in Glasgow, Scotland, National Rail station code PWW
- Pro Wrestling Worldwide, a professional wrestling promoter in the United States
- Northern Pwo language, ISO 639-3 language code pww
