= SCQ =

SCQ may refer to

- Special composition question, in philosophy
- Santiago de Compostela Airport, Spain
- Star Circle Quest, a Filipino TV series
- Sa'och language, ISO 639-3 code
