= Deafness in Cambodia =

== Sign language ==
=== Khmer and Cambodian sign language ===
Khmer is the native language to Cambodia. With this name, the sign language used is occasionally referred to as Khmer Sign Language, KSL. However, Khmer is the spoken language in Cambodia. Driving distinction between the Deaf and hearing populations, the sign language of Cambodia is more often referred to as Cambodian Sign Language, or CSL—CBDSL to avoid sign languages of similar abbreviations.

As a result of Pol Pot's rise with the coming up of the political faction known as Khmer Rouge, many texts from the National Library of Cambodia were burned. An estimated 80 percent of books were burned, erasing much of Cambodia's preserved history. These texts may have documented aspects of Cambodia's Deaf or hard of hearing population, such as possible sign languages before Pol Pot's rule. After the end of Khmer Rouge's influence, the Deaf Development Programme was founded (1979), forming what is now known as a dialect of Cambodian Sign Language with the help of outside organizations, such as the Finnish Association of the Deaf.

In beginning the deaf schooling, parts of American Sign Language (ASL) were used as a basis of signing. This is distinct from the indigenous Cambodian Sign language, creating what is known as Krousar Thmey Sign Language. However outside of the creation of formal deaf schooling, the indigenous language of Cambodian Sign Language was found to have a 42% similarity to Modern Thai Sign Language (TSL), showing possible interaction between the Deaf populations in Cambodia and Thailand. Because of the basis of ASL used in the Krousar Thmey school, it can be seen as a Deaf-community sign language.

Cambodian Sign Language shows an Expanded Graded Intergenerational Disruption Scale (EGIDS) score of five, described as being a developing language. The Deaf or hard of hearing population of Cambodia has an estimated 60,000 people, with an estimate of 300 people using the indigenous CBDSL while the rest use Krousar Thmey Sign Language. However, Cambodian Sign Language has not been nationally recognized by the Cambodian Government.

== Newborn hearing screenings ==
Cambodia's state of newborn hearing screenings is limited. A study found that in 2013, Cambodia implemented a sporadic assessment for screening newborns—newborns with major risks. All of the screenings use otoacoustic emissions (OAE). Also, all screenings were performed by mid-level primary ear and hearing care clinicians. Moreover, charities have since come to aid in this deficiency of newborn hearing screenings. Angus Lawson Memorial Trust (ALMT) and All Ears Cambodia (AEC) are two non-governmental organizations that have made it their goals to reduce the congenital hearing loss. Further providing aid to the vastly rural parts of Cambodia that otherwise have no access to mainstream healthcare.

== Early intervention ==
Much of Cambodia's population live in rural areas, making access to healthcare, nonetheless disease detection, much harder for the population, especially at younger ages. As well, there are few areas in Cambodia that provide means of hearing care, ENT departments, with the majority of facilities located in Phnom Penh, the capital. This shortage for the broad majority of Cambodians allow for many diseases, such as ear infections, to be negligible, often overlooked.

Many non-governmental agencies have taken strides in Cambodia to reduce these instances of long-term detriment. Groups, such as All Ears Cambodia and Impact Cambodia, have taken part in collaboration with hospitals in Cambodia, that contain ENT departments, to provide early intervention care. This care consists of providing users with cochlear implants, at which users pay for the implementation, speech therapy, and some places offering rehabilitation services. Despite this being offered, there are still many Cambodians that have not had the opportunity to learn a sign language, leaving many to be language deprived and with little support. As well, these services (hearing aids and cochlear implants) are often far too expensive for the majority of Deaf or hard of hearing Cambodians, limiting the amount of care for the Deaf population.

== Human and civil rights ==
Cambodia passed the Law on The Protection and Promotion of the Rights of Persons with Disabilities in 2009. Under this law, the Disability Action Council (DAC) was established under Chapter 2. Despite this effort to advocate for persons with disabilities, there has been little work to put this play into action. Disabilities and diseases are often overlooked, whether it be due to a large population already possessing the disability/disease or a lack of expertise.

Cambodia signed and ratified the Convention of the Rights of Persons with Disabilities on October 1, 2007, and December 12, 2012, respectfully.

== Language endangerment and revitalization ==
Whilst Khmer Rouge was in power under the direction of Pol Pot, CBDSL was not used in educational or governmental spaces, as the Deaf, or minority groups, were targeted by Khmer Rouge. With the country's population size of approximately 17,281,000, it has been hard to find accurate sources that depict the Deaf population. These numbers have ranged from 3,000 signers to 60,000 signers, with much more to be unknown, as these numbers signify signers and leave out those who are potentially language deprived or hard of hearing. Cambodian Sign Language (CBDSL) has an EGIDS score of 5. However, most of signers live in Phnom Penh, leaving many rural Deaf individuals left without much resources. Many signers reside in Phnom Penh due to the Krousar Thmey schools that were made with the help of the DDP.

With the help of Krousar Thmey, a form of sign language was made to be introduced to the people of Cambodia, following Khmer Rouge's rule. The first Krousar Thmey school was opened in Phnom Penh. With the need of a language, Krousar Thmey used parts of ASL as a guideline for possible future alterations to the language. This dialect, Krousar Thmey Sign Language, was taught in Krousar Thmey Schools, meant for children so they have a language. Distinctly, the DDP gathered signs from the community, forming an indigenous form on Cambodian Sign Language. However, this formed a barrier between the Deaf, dividing Deaf or hard of hearing Cambodians by signs that derived from ASL and signs that were collected by the signers of Cambodia. Because of this divide, in 2013, the two organizations decided to form one unified sign language, which is what we now refer to as Cambodian Sign Language (CBDSL). However, because the largely Deaf population is not able to access this language due to regional restrictions, possibly relying on home signs. The focus of Deaf schools in Phnom Penh create distinction between rural and urban regions of Cambodia.

There have been efforts made in documenting CBDSL, acting to preserve the language before events, such as the Cambodian Genocide, seem to take play.
