= Areng Valley =

Region of Koh Kong, Cambodia

Coordinates: 11°37′53″N 103°31′52″E

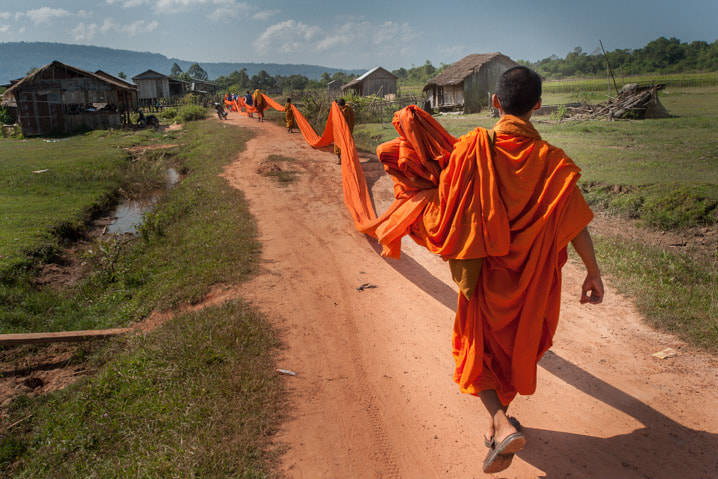
Buddhist monks in the Areng Valley

The Areng Valley, or Steung Areng, is a region of Koh Kong province in the Cardamom Mountains of Cambodia. The valley overlaps Central Cardamom Mountains National Park. The area possesses intact tropical forest and provides habitat for rare species such as Siamese crocodiles, Asian elephants and Asian arowana. It has been inhabited by the Indigenous Chong people for over 600 years. In 2013 and 2014, the environmental and social impact of the proposed Cheay Areng hydropower dam, which would have flooded the valley, led to a local protest movement and opposition from a coalition of NGOs. This led to the ultimate cancellation of the project.
