= Nationality, religion, and language data for the provinces of Thailand =

A 1974 ethnolinguistic map of Thailand, showing Khmers (in green) near the Cambodian border and Malays (in purple) near the Malaysian border.

In its 1970 and 2000 censuses, Thailand collected nationality data by province, whereas in its 1990 and 2000 census, Thailand collected both religion and language data by province. In both 1970 and 2000, almost every Thai province's population was 95.0% or more Thai nationals. Bangkok was the only exception to this rule in 1970, and just barely, whereas Chiang Rai, Tak, Ranong, and Mae Hong Son (but not Bangkok) were the only exceptions to this rule in 2000. In both 1970 and 2000, almost every Thai province's population was Buddhist-majority (indeed, many Thai provinces in both 1990 and 2000 even had Buddhist percentages of 99.0% or more), with the only exceptions being Narathiwat, Pattani, Satun, and Yala, all of which are both Muslim-majority and located in southern Thailand–specifically near Thailand's border with Malaysia. Indeed, both Narathiwat and Pattani were over 80.0% Muslim in 2000, albeit (barely) not in 1990. Meanwhile, Krabi had a Buddhist majority in both 1990 and 2000 but nevertheless had a huge Muslim minority of over one-third of its total population in both of these years. Other than Chiang Mai, no Thai province had a Christian population of 2.0% or more in either 1990 or 2000, with Chiang Mai's Christian percentage almost doubling from 3.3% to 6.0% between 1990 and 2000.

Mae Hong Son's population was composed of a majority of hill tribe language speakers in both 1990 and 2000 whereas hill tribe language speakers also made up 10.0% or more of the population in Tak in 1990 and in Tak along with Nan, Chiang Rai, and Chiang Mai in 2000. Yala, Pattani, and Narathiwat all had Malay-speaking majorities of over 60.0% in both 1990 and 2000 but no other Thai province actually had anything close to a Malay-speaking majority in either of these two Thai census years. In fact, no other Thai province even had a Malay-speaking percentage in the double-digits in either of these two census years, though Satun did come extremely close in 2000, with it being 9.9% Malay in that year–an absolutely gigantic increase from 1990, when it was only 2.8% Malay. Both Sisaket and Surin had Khmer-speaking percentages of over 25.0% in both 1990 and 2000, with Surin even having a Khmer-speaking majority of over 60.0% in 1990, albeit with it falling just short of a Khmer-speaking majority in 2000. Meanwhile, Buriram had almost no Khmer speakers in 1990 but saw its Khmer percentage explode and increase to over 25.0% of its total population by 2000. Some Thai provinces also had Vietnamese-speaking, Laotian-speaking, Burmese-speaking, Peguan-speaking, Chinese-speaking, and/or Japanese-speaking minorities in 1990 and/or 2000, but these minorities were always a single-digit percentage or less of these provinces' total population in both of these years. For instance, no Thai province had a Burmese- and Peguan-speaking minority of 5.0% or more in 1990, though Ranong–located on the southern edge of Thailand's border with Burma–did have a Burmese- and Peguan-speaking minority of 7.0% in 2000, higher than any other Thai province for that year and also a huge increase from 1990, when the size of its Burmese- and Peguan-speaking minority was just 2.43%. Similarly, no Thai province had a Chinese-speaking minority of 5.0% or more in either 1990 or more, though Yala came close in 1990, being 4.4% Chinese-speaking that year (Yala was less close to 5.0% in 2000, with it being just 3.0% Chinese-speaking in 2000).

1970 data does not exist for several Thai provinces, often because they were only made provinces in their own right–as a result of them being separated from other Thai provinces–after 1970. For instance, Yasothon was only separated from Ubon Ratchathani in 1972, two years after the 1970 Thai census. There is also the possibility of there being no published data for certain groups (whether Muslims, Christians, et cetera) in certain Thai census years if the size of the groups in question in certain Thai provinces was too small (as in, <0.1%) in those specific years.

== Data ==
Nationality data by Thai province for 1970 and 2000 and religion and language data by Thai province for 1990 and 2000
province name	% Thai nationals in 1970	% Thai nationals in 2000	Buddhist % in 1990	Buddhist % in 2000	Muslim % in 1990	Muslim % in 2000	Christian % in 1990	Christian % in 2000	Linguistic minorities in 1990	Linguistic minorities in 2000
Amnat Charoen	N/A	99.8%	N/A	98.8%	N/A	0.1%	N/A	N/A	N/A	N/A
Ang Thong	99.4%	99.8%	99.0%	98.1%	1.0%	1.4%	N/A	N/A	N/A	N/A
Phra Nakhon Si Ayutthaya	99.4%	99.8%	94.9%	94.3%	4.8%	4.8%	N/A	N/A	Malay-Yawi (0.1%), Laotian and Vietnamese (0.3%), Japanese (<0.1%), Khmer (<0.1%)	Malay-Yawi (<0.1%), Laotian and Vietnamese (<0.1%), Japanese (0.02%), Khmer (0.02%)
Bangkok	94.8%	99.0%	95.1%	94.5%	4.0%	4.1%	0.7%	1.0%	English (0.1%), Indian languages (0.1%), Japanese (<0.1%)	English (0.7%), Indian languages (0.1%), Japanese (0.1%)
Buriram	99.7%	99.8%	99.7%	99.4%	0.1%	0.1%	N/A	N/A	Khmer (0.3%), Laotian and Vietnamese (0.8%)	Khmer (27.6%), Laotian and Vietnamese (0.1%)
Chachoengsao	98.9%	99.8%	93.6%	92.7%	5.9%	6.4%	0.5%	0.6%	N/A	N/A
Chai Nat	99.2%	99.8%	99.8%	99.5%	0.1%	0.3%	N/A	N/A	N/A	N/A
Chaiyaphum	99.8%	99.9%	99.8%	99.4%	0.1%	0.1%	N/A	N/A	N/A	N/A
Chanthaburi	99.2%	99.8%	98.4%	97.9%	0.1%	0.2%	1.5%	1.8%	Khmer (0.6%)	Khmer (1.6%)
Chiang Mai	99.4%	96.6%	95.7%	92.2%	N/A	N/A	3.3%	6.0%	Hill tribe languages (9.7%)	Hill tribe languages (13.4%)
Chiang Rai	99.5%	92.0%	95.1%	90.6%	0.3%	0.3%	N/A	N/A	Hill tribe languages (3.4%)	Hill tribe languages (12.5%)
Chonburi	98.2%	99.4%	98.5%	96.9%	1.0%	1.6%	0.5%	0.9%	N/A	N/A
Chumpon	99.1%	99.2%	99.5%	98.9%	0.3%	0.7%	N/A	N/A	N/A	N/A
Kalasin	99.7%	99.8%	99.8%	99.5	0.1%	0.1%	N/A	N/A	N/A	N/A
Kamphaeng Phet	99.6%	99.8%	99.5%	99.0%	N/A	N/A	0.3%	0.3	Hill tribe languages (1.1%)	Hill tribe languages (<0.1%)
Kanchanaburi	98.0%	96.0%	99.6%	99.0%	0.1%	0.3%	0.2%	0.6%	Burmese and Peguan (1.4%), Hill tribe languages (1.4%)	Burmese and Peguan (2.9%), Hill tribe languages (2.1%)
Khon Kaen	99.6%	99.8%	99.7%	99.4%	0.1%	0.1%	N/A	N/A	N/A	N/A
Krabi	99.6%	99.8%	64.2%	65.2%	35.6%	34.7%	N/A	N/A	Malay (0.2%)	Malay (0.2%)
Lampang	99.6%	99.8%	99.0%	98.7%	N/A	N/A	0.6%	0.9%	Hill tribe languages (0.8%)	Hill tribe languages (1.0%)
Lamphun	99.8%	99.8%	99.7%	99.5	0.1%	0.2%	N/A	N/A	Hill tribe languages (4.7%)	Hill tribe languages (6.0%)
Loei	99.7%	99.4%	99.5%	99.4%	0.1%	0.1%	0.3%	0.4%	N/A	N/A
Lopburi	99.6%	99.8%	99.8%	99.5%	0.1%	0.2%	N/A	N/A	N/A	N/A
Mae Hong Son	99.6%	94.0%	83.1%	74.9%	0.4%	0.6%	N/A	N/A	Hill tribe languages (51.1%)	Hill tribe languages (63.0%)
Maha Sarakham	99.8%	99.9%	99.8%	99.8%	0.1%	0.1%	N/A	N/A	Khmer (0.2%)	Khmer (0.3%)
Mukdahan	N/A	99.2%	98.9%	98.8%	0.1%	0.2%	N/A	N/A	Laotian and Vietnamese (0.7%)	Laotian and Vietnamese (0.7%)
Nakhon Nayok	99.2%	99.8%	94.8%	93.5%	4.9%	5.9%	N/A	N/A	N/A	N/A
Nakhon Pathom	98.5%	99.8%	98.8%	98.8%	0.1%	0.2%	1.1%	0.8%	N/A	N/A
Nakhon Phanom	99.0%	99.5%	99.1%	98.9%	0.1%	0.1%	N/A	N/A	Laotian and Vietnamese (0.5%)	Laotian and Vietnamese (0.2%)
Nakhon Ratchasima	99.5%	99.8%	99.6%	99.1%	0.1%	0.1%	N/A	N/A	Khmer (0.1%)	Khmer (0.2%)
Nakhon Sawan	99.2%	99.4%	99.6%	99.2%	0.1%	0.5%	N/A	N/A	N/A	N/A
Nakhon Si Thamarrat	99.4%	99.9%	94.3%	93.1%	5.6%	6.2%	N/A	N/A	Malay (1.4%), Chinese (1.4%)	Malay (2.9%), Chinese (2.1%)
Nan	99.7%	99.7%	98.4%	95.8%	N/A	N/A	0.5%	1.0%	Hill tribe languages (3.1%)	Hill tribe languages (10.5%)
Narathiwat	99.0%	99.8%	20.5%	17.9%	79.2%	82.0%	N/A	N/A	Malay (77.9%), Chinese (0.7%)	Malay (80.4%), Chinese (0.3%)
Nonthaburi	98.8%	99.6%	95.1%	95.2%	4.4%	4.0%	N/A	N/A	Burmese and Peguan (0.1%), Malay (0.1%)	Burmese and Peguan (0.2%), Malay (<0.1%)
Nong Bau Lam Phu	N/A	99.9%	N/A	99.9%	N/A	N/A	N/A	N/A	N/A	N/A
Nong Khai	98.0%	99.5%	99.5%	99.1%	0.1%	0.1%	N/A	N/A	N/A	N/A
Pathum Thani	98.8%	99.7%	96.8%	96.3%	2.8%	2.9%	N/A	N/A	Malay (1.1%)	Malay (0.1%)
Pattani	99.4%	99.9%	21.4%	19.2%	78.4%	80.7%	N/A	N/A	Malay (70.5%), Chinese (0.3%)	Malay (76.6%), Chinese (1.0%)
Phayao	N/A	99.6%	98.6%	97.9%	N/A	N/A	0.7%	0.8%	Hill tribe languages (1.5%)	Hill tribe languages (2.6%)
Phangnga	99.3%	97.8%	77.0%	76.3%	22.8%	23.2%	N/A	N/A	Burmese and Peguan (0.1%)	Burmese and Peguan (1.7%)
Phatthalung	99.6%	99.9%	91.3%	88.3%	8.6%	11.1%	N/A	N/A	Malay (0.2%)	Malay (0.1%)
Phetchabun	99.6%	99.8%	99.3%	99.1%	N/A	N/A	0.4%	0.3%	Hill tribe languages (0.9%)	Hill tribe languages (1.0%)
Phetchaburi	99.2%	99.7%	97.8%	97.1%	2.2%	2.5%	N/A	N/A	Hill tribe languages (0.1%)	Hill tribe languages (0.1%)
Phichit	99.4%	99.9%	99.7%	99.2%	0.1%	0.1%	N/A	N/A	N/A	N/A
Phitsanulok	99.4%	99.8%	99.4%	99.3%	0.1%	0.1%	0.2%	0.3%	Hill tribe languages (0.4%)	Hill tribe languages (0.7%)
Phrae	99.7%	99.9%	99.6%	99.0%	0.1%	0.1%	N/A	N/A	Hill tribe languages (1.0%)	Hill tribe languages (1.9%)
Phuket	98.7%	98.5%	82.8%	81.6%	16.9%	17.1%	N/A	N/A	Malay (0.5%)	Malay (0.7%)
Prachuap Khiri Khan	99.0%	99.3%	98.9%	98.3%	0.1%	1.0%	N/A	N/A	Hill tribe languages (0.2%), Burmese and Peguan (0.1%)	Hill tribe languages (0.1%), Burmese and Peguan (<0.1%)
Prachin Buri	99.4%	99.8%	99.6%	98.8%	0.1%	0.2%	0.3%	0.5%	Khmer (1.8%)	Khmer (0.1%)
Ranong	98.7%	93.4%	88.5%	88.5%	11.0%	10.9%	N/A	N/A	Malay (1.1%), Burmese and Peguan (2.43%)	Malay (0.5%), Burmese and Peguan (7.0%)
Ratchaburi	98.8%	99.3%	98.9%	98.3%	N/A	N/A	0.9%	1.2%	Hill tribe languages (0.5%), Burmese and Peguan (0.4%), Laotian and Vietnamese (0.5%)	Hill tribe languages (1.1%), Burmese and Peguan (0.6%), Laotian and Vietnamese (0.5%)
Rayong	99.1%	99.7%	98.8%	98.4%	1.1%	1.1%	N/A	N/A	Japanese (<0.1%)	Japanese (0.1%)
Roi Et	99.8%	99.9%	99.7%	99.4%	0.1%	0.1%	N/A	N/A	Khmer (0.4%)	Khmer (0.5%)
Sa Kaeo	N/A	99.7%	N/A	99.4%	N/A	0.2%	N/A	0.3%	N/A	Khmer (1.9%)
Sakon Nakhon	99.4%	99.8%	96.8%	96.8%	0.1%	0.1%	N/A	N/A	Laotian and Vietnamese (0.3%)	Laotian and Vietnamese (0.1%)
Samutprakan	98.4%	99.8%	98.0%	97.7%	1.3%	1.5%	N/A	N/A	Chinese (0.4%)	Chinese (0.5%)
Samut Sakhon	98.6%	99.0%	99.7%	98.9%	0.1%	0.3%	0.2%	0.2%	Burmese and Peguan (1.9%)	Burmese and Peguan (0.6%)
Samut Songkhram	98.8%	99.6%	99.1%	98.3%	0.2%	0.4%	N/A	N/A	N/A	N/A
Saraburi	99.2%	99.6%	99.6%	97.7%	0.4%	0.3%	N/A	N/A	Laotian and Vietnamese (0.2%), Hill tribe languages (<0.1%)	Laotian and Vietnamese (<0.1%), Hill tribe languages (1.8%)
Sing Buri	99.3%	99.8%	99.4%	99.2%	0.2%	0.4%	N/A	N/A	N/A	N/A
Sisaket	99.8%	99.9%	99.6%	99.4%	0.1%	0.1%	N/A	N/A	Khmer (30.2%)	Khmer (26.2%)
Songkhla	98.3%	99.8%	78.8%	76.6%	21.0%	23.2%	N/A	N/A	Malay (5.5%)	Malay (4.6%)
Satun	99.5%	99.9%	32.7%	31.9%	67.1%	67.8%	N/A	N/A	Malay (2.8%)	Malay (9.9%)
Sukhothai	99.5%	99.6%	99.5%	99.8%	0.1%	0.1%	N/A	N/A	Hill tribe languages (0.5%)	Hill tribe languages (0.2%)
Suphan Buri	99.0%	99.8%	99.9%	99.2%	0.1%	0.1%	0.1%	0.2%	Laotian and Vietnamese (0.3%)	Laotian and Vietnamese (0.8%)
Surat Thani	99.1%	99.7%	98.2%	97.3%	1.6%	2.0%	0.1%	0.2%	Chinese (0.1%)	Chinese (0.1%)
Surin	99.7%	99.5%	99.8%	99.3%	0.1%	0.1%	N/A	N/A	Khmer (63.4%)	Khmer (47.2%)
Tak	99.5%	93.3%	96.6%	95.1%	0.4%	1.2%	N/A	N/A	Burmese and Peguan (0.3%), Hill tribe languages (18.1%)	Burmese and Peguan (2.6%), Hill tribe languages (24.3%)
Trat	99.5%	97.0%	97.3%	97.0%	2.5%	2.8%	N/A	N/A	Burmese and Peguan (0.1%), Khmer (0.4%)	Burmese and Peguan (0.3%), Khmer (2.1%)
Trang	99.1%	99.8%	86.7%	86.0%	13.1%	13.7%	N/A	N/A	N/A	N/A
Ubon Ratchathani	99.4%	99.7%	99.3%	99.4%	0.1%	0.1%	N/A	N/A	Khmer (0.8%)	Khmer (0.3%)
Udon Thani	99.5%	99.8%	99.4%	99.4%	0.1%	0.1%	N/A	N/A	N/A	N/A
Uthai Thani	99.6%	99.9%	99.8%	99.6%	0.1%	0.2%	N/A	N/A	Hill tribe languages (0.8%)	Hill tribe languages (0.5%)
Uttaradit	99.5%	99.7%	99.6%	99.2%	0.1%	0.1%	0.1%	0.3%	Laotian and Vietnamese (0.1%)	Laotian and Vietnamese (0.3%)
Yala	97.3%	99.8%	35.9%	31.0%	63.8%	68.9%	N/A	N/A	Malay (62.4%), Chinese (4.4%)	Malay (66.1%), Chinese (3.0%)
Yasothon	N/A	99.9%	99.1%	98.7%	0.1%	0.1%	N/A	N/A	N/A	N/A

== See also ==
- Demographics of Thailand
- Ethnic groups in Thailand
- Languages of Thailand
- Provinces of Thailand
- Religion in Thailand
