= Cheay Areng Dam =

Proposed hydroelectric dam in Cambodia

Cheay Areng Dam was a proposed 108 MW hydroelectric dam on Areng river in Koh Kong Province in the southwest part of Cambodia (coordinate: 11°37′11″N 103°30′46″E).

China Guodian Corporation once intended to build the dam. Sinohydro Resources Ltd, a holding company for Sinohydro Group, was granted approval in February 2014 for six months of extensive drilling, geological mapping and prospecting in the dam concession.

The project was shelved in 2017 by Prime Minister Hun Sen due to a strong local opposition to the dam. A new coal plant will be constructed in Preah Sihanouk as a compensation.

== Environmental and social concerns ==
Cheay Areng Dam was to be built in the Central Cardamom Protected Forest (CCPF), largest unbroken tract of woodland in Southeast Asia, covering 4,013 km^{2}. This area, made up of a series of adjoining national parks, hosts a high biodiversity including 31 endangered animal species, among which the world’s second-largest population of wild Siamese crocodile.

Furthermore, the dam would flow a 20 km^{2} area from which 1500 Chong people indigenous people would have to be relocated. Buddhist monks and villagers are against the project. As of 2014, local residents continue to oppose construction of the dam, which would provide power principally to neighboring countries.
