= Chong language =

Endangered language spoken in Thailand

Chong
- Samre
- ภาษาชอง
- Native to: Thailand
- Region: Pursat Province, Chantaburi
- Ethnicity: 2,000 Chong (2007)
- Native speakers: 500 (2007)
- Language family: Austroasiatic: Pearic; Chong languages; Chong
- Dialects: Kasong; Samre of Pursat; etc.
- Writing system: Thai, Chong (invented in 2010)

Language codes
- ISO 639-3: cog
- Glottolog: chon1284 Western cent2314 Central
- ELP: Chong; Samre

Chong (Thai: ภาษาชอง, also spelled Chawng, Shong, Xong) is an endangered language spoken in eastern Thailand and formerly in Cambodia by the Chong. It is a Western Pearic language in the Mon–Khmer language family. Chong is currently the focus of a language revitalization project in Thailand.

The Chong language is marked by its unusual four-way contrast in register. Its grammar has not been extensively studied, but it is unrelated to the Thai language which is in the Tai–Kadai language family. Chong had no written form until 2000, when researchers at Mahidol University used a simplified version of standard Thai characters to create a Chong writing system, after which the first teaching materials in the language appeared. Chong is currently considered to be at stage 7 in Joshua Fishman's Graded Intergenerational Disruption Scale (GIDS), where stage 8 is the closest to extinction.

Chong is actually two languages, Western Chong, and Central Chong or Samre. The Western Chong community in Thailand is primarily located in and around Chanthaburi.

Central Chong includes the Kasong dialect of Trat. (See that article for details.)

While the language spoken in Thailand has been studied recently, the Chong language in Cambodia has not been investigated yet. David Bradley (2007) reports no remaining speakers.

== Classification ==
A number of Pearic languages are called "Chong", and they all do not constitute a single language. Chong proper consists of the majority of varieties which Sidwell (2009) labeled "Western Chong". This includes the main dialect around Chanthaburi Province (mostly in southern Khao Khitchakut District and western Pong Nam Ron District). on the Thai–Cambodian border. These should not be confused with the variety called "Chong" in Trat Province of eastern Thailand, nor with "Kasong" Chong, both of which were classified as "Central Chong" along with Samre, and so should perhaps be considered dialects of Samre rather than of Chong. Similarly, the languages called "Chung" in Kanchanaburi Province and in Cambodia are dialects of Sa'och, and were classified as "Southern Chong" along with Suoi.

- Western Chong dialects (Chong proper)
  - Chong of Chantaburi (Baradat ms.)
    - Chong həəp (Martin 1974)
    - Khlong Phlu Chong (Siripen Ungsitibonporn 2001)
    - Chong lɔɔ (Martin 1974)
    - Wang Kraphrae Chong (Siripen Ungsitibonporn 2001)
    - Chong (Huffman 1983)

Isara Choosri (2002) lists the following dialects of Chong spoken in Chanthaburi Province.

- Takhian Thong ตะเคียนทอง (Northern Chong): in Ban Khlong Phlu คลองพลู (northernmost location); Ban Nam Khun, Ban Takhian Thong ตะเคียนทอง, Ban Cham Khloh. This is the northernmost dialect; in the past, Chong speakers used to settle as far north as Ban Chankhlem จันทเขลม. A few thousand speakers. Formerly grouped as part of the western dialect also known as Chong lɔɔ.
- Phluang พลวง (Southern Chong): in Ban Krathing, Ban Thung Saphan, Ban Thung Ta-In, Ban Phang Kalaeng. Hundreds of speakers. Formerly grouped as part of the western dialect also known as Chong lɔɔ.
- Pong Nam Ron โป่งน้ำร้อน (Eastern Chong): in Ban Wang Kraphrae. A few dozen speakers left. Eastern dialect also known as Chong həəp.

The Central Chong dialects are,

- Samre of Pursat
- Samre (Pornsawan Ploykaew 2001)
- Chong (Baradat ms.)
- Kasong (Noppawan Thongkham 2003), historically called Chong of Trat (Pannetier ms., Isarangura 1935)

== Phonology ==
=== Consonants ===
Consonant phonemes of Chong
	Labial	Alveolar	Palatal	Velar	Glottal
Nasal	m	n	ɲ	ŋ	
Stop	p pʰ b	t tʰ d	c cʰ	k kʰ	ʔ
Fricative	(f)	s			h
Trill		r			
Lateral		l			
Approximant	w		j		

=== Vowels ===
Vowel phonemes of Chong
	Front	Central	Back
Close	i,iː	ɨ,ɨː	u,uː
Close-Mid	e,eː	ə,əː	o,oː
Open-mid	ɛ,ɛː		ɔ,ɔː
Open		a,aː	
