= Samre language of Pursat =

Pearic language of Thailand

Samre
- Native to: Thailand, Cambodia
- Region: Trat Province formerly Pursat Province
- Ethnicity: 200 (2000)
- Native speakers: (20–30 cited 1998)
- Language family: Austroasiatic: Pearic; Chong; Central Chong; Samre

Language codes
- ISO 639-3: sxm
- Glottolog: None
- ELP: Samre

Samre (Samre pronunciation: [samɣeː]), is a nearly extinct Pearic language of Thailand and, formerly, Cambodia. The language is evidently extinct in Cambodia, but a 1998 survey found 20–30 speakers in Nonsi Subdistrict, Bo Rai District, Trat Province, Thailand and estimated the total number of people able to speak the language to be 200.

== Phonology ==
The phonemic inventory is typical of modern Mon-Khmer languages and, along with the other Pearic languages, shows some phonological influences from the late Middle Khmer of the 17th century. Samre also shows influence from Thai in that it has a developing tonal system. Like many other Austroasiatic languages in general, and the Pearic languages in particular, Samre vowels may differ in voice quality, a system known as "register", or "phonation". However, the breathy voice versus clear voice distinction is no longer contrastive and is secondary to a word's tone.

=== Consonants ===
Samre has 21 consonant phonemes with [ɹ] and [ɰ] occurring as allophones of /ɣ/. They are listed in table form below.

		Labial	Alveolar		Palatal	Velar	Glottal
Plosive	Aspirated	pʰ	tʰ		cʰ	kʰ	
Plosive	Voiceless	p	t		c	k	ʔ
Plosive	Voiced	b	d				
Nasal	Voiced	m	n		ɲ	ŋ	
Fricative	Voiceless		s				h
Fricative	Voiced					ɣ	
Approximant	Voiced	w	l	[ɹ]	j	[ɰ]	

The Samre recognize [ɣ] as a sound unique to their language in comparison to Thai and other surrounding indigenous languages. This voiced velar fricative occurs in free variation with the voiced alveolar approximant, [ɹ], except when following /a/ or /aː/ word-finally, in which case it is pronounced as [ɰ], the voiced velar approximant. The pronunciation [ɣ] is mostly heard among the older generation who consider it to be the "correct" pronunciation. It can be considered a "harsh" sound and [ɹ] is sometimes used when the speaker wishes to sound "softer" or "soothing". The [ɣ] sound is not often heard among younger or less fluent speakers who use [ɹ] or replace the sound with a tapped or trilled /r/ due to influence from Thai.

=== Vowels ===
Samre contrasts nine vowel qualities which can be either short or long, yielding a total of 18 vowel phonemes. There are three diphthongs: /iə/, /ɨə/, and /uə/. The vowels of Samre are:

	Front		Central		Back	
	short	long	short	long	short	long
Close	/i/	/iː/	/ɨ/	/ɨː/	/u/	/uː/
Close-mid	/e/	/eː/	/ə/	/əː/	/o/	/oː/
Open-mid	/ɛ/	/ɛː/			/ɔ/	/ɔː/
Open			/a/	/aː/		
