= Kasong dialect =

Pearic language of Thailand

Kasong
- Chong of Trat
- Native to: Thailand
- Region: Trat Province
- Native speakers: 50 (2008)
- Language family: Austroasiatic: Pearic; Chong; Central Chong; Kasong
- Writing system: none

Language codes
- ISO 639-3: None (mis)
- Glottolog: None
- ELP: Kasong
- Kasong is classified as Critically Endangered by the UNESCO Atlas of the World's Languages in Danger

Kasong, also previously known as "Chong of Trat", is an endangered Pearic language of the Austroasiatic family spoken in Bo Rai District, Trat Province of Thailand. On the basis of lexical similarity determined with a relatively short word list, Kasong has been classified as a dialect of Central Chong. However, further study and longer word lists point to Kasong being a separate language closely related to Chong and Samre. Kasong is nearly extinct; there are no monolinguals and all speakers use Thai as their primary language.

Of the vocabulary tested, a study found 55.38 percent of the language to consist of Thai loanwords. These loanwords are grouped into two subtypes: direct from Thai or a Thai word added to an existing Kasong word. This high percentage is indicative of the language's route to potential extinction as Thai displaces it.

More than 50 years ago, all Kasong people were forbidden to use the Kasong language in their families and with others as a result of governors believing that speaking Kasong interfered with speaking Thai. Thus, Kasong speakers taught their descendants Thai instead of Kasong. Thai nationalism led to the Kasong people becoming ashamed of their language and not being concerned with its preservation. The Kasong language and its people is representative of Thailand's many ethnolinguistic minorities.
