= Pwo Karen languages =

Sino-Tibetan language group of Burma

Pwo
- Geographic distribution: Karen State, Burma and across the border into Thailand
- Ethnicity: Karen
- Linguistic classification: Sino-Tibetan: Tibeto-Burman; Karenic; Pwo

Language codes
- ISO 639-3: pwo
- Glottolog: pwoo1239

The Pwo Karen language is one of the main groups of the Karen languages, alongside the S'gaw Karen language and Pa'O. The Pwo Karen language contains four different dialects, which are at best marginally mutually intelligible:

- Eastern Pwo (code: kjp)
- Western Pwo (code: pwo)
- Northern Pwo (code: pww)
- Phrae Pwo (code: kjt)

The people who speak the language are referred to by many names, notably "Pwo Karen" or simply "Karen". The people call themselves Ploan Sho. The Pwo Karen people have lived in the eastern part of Burma for centuries, and in the western and northern parts of Thailand for at least seven or eight centuries. The population of “Pwo karen” is 1,525,300 in Myanmar.

The endonym is Phlou [pʰlou̯] or Ka Phlou [ka pʰlou̯], meaning "human beings".
