= Somray language =

Austroasiatic language of Cambodia

Somray
- Northern Chong
- Native to: Cambodia
- Region: Pursat Province
- Native speakers: 4,100 (2005)
- Language family: Austroasiatic: Pearic; Chong languages; Somray
- Writing system: Khmer script

Language codes
- ISO 639-3: smu – inclusive code Individual code: sxm – Somre of Siem Reap
- Glottolog: somr1240
- ELP: Somray
- Somray is classified as Critically Endangered by the UNESCO Atlas of the World's Languages in Danger

Somray, or Northern Chong, is a Pearic language of Cambodia.

== Geographical distribution ==
Somray is spoken in the following areas of Cambodia.

- Battambang province: Phumi Chhak Rokar area (Baradat ms.)
- Koh Kong province: far north
- Pursat province: 2 areas, north, east, and west of Phum Tasanh, and Tanyong river around Phum Pra Moi

The extinct Somre of Siem Reap (Moura 1883) was a dialect of the same language.

== Phonology ==
=== Consonants ===
		Labial	Alveolar	Palatal	Velar	Glottal
Nasal		m	n	(ɲ)	ŋ	
Stop	voiceless	p	t	c	k	ʔ
Stop	aspirated	pʰ	tʰ	cʰ	kʰ	
Stop	voiced	b	d			
Fricative		v	s			h
Trill			r			
Approximant			l	j		

- An initial [ɲ] mainly exists from Khmer word-borrowings.
- The voiced stops /b, d/ in word-initial position are heard as glottalized [ˀb, ˀd].

Final consonants
	Labial	Alveolar	Palatal	Velar	Glottal
Nasal	m	n	ɲ*	ŋ	
Stop	p	t	c	k	ʔ
Fricative	v				h
Trill		r			
Approximant		l	j		

*- only in a few cases in final position.

=== Vowels ===
	Front	Central	Back
Close	i, iː	ɯ, ɯː	u, uː
Close-Mid	e, eː	ə, əː	o, oː
Open-mid	ɛ, ɛː		ɔ, ɔː
Open		a, aː	

- Vowels may also occur as glottalized [Vˀ].
- Vowels /ɯ, ɯː/ can be heard as either back [ɯ, ɯː] or central [ɨ, ɨː].
- /a/ can also be heard as [ɤ, ə] when preceding /n, t/.
