= Pearic languages =

Subgroup of the Austroasiatic language family

Pearic
- Chongic
- Geographic distribution: Indochina
- Linguistic classification: Austroasiatic: Pearic
- Proto-language: Proto-Pearic
- Subdivisions: Pear; Chong

Language codes
- Glottolog: pear1246
- Pearic

The Pearic languages (alternatively called the Chongic languages) are a group of endangered languages of the Eastern Mon–Khmer branch of the Austroasiatic language family, spoken by Pear people (the Por, the Samré, the Samray, the Suoy, and the Chong) living in western Cambodia and eastern Thailand.

Pearic languages are remnants of the aboriginal languages of much of Cambodia, but have dwindled in numbers due to assimilation. "Pear" is a pejorative term meaning 'slave' or 'caste'.

== Classification ==
Paul Sidwell proposed the following classification of the Pearic languages in Sidwell (2009:137), synthesizing analyses from Headley (1985), Choosri (2002), Martin (1974), and Peiros (2004) He divides Pearic into two primary branches (Pear and Chong), with Chong being further divided into four groups.

- Pearic
  - Pear of Kompong Thom (Baradat ms.)
  - Chong
    - Southern
      - Suoi of Kampong Speu (Pannetier ms., Baradat ms.)
      - Saoch, two dialects:
        - Chung of Cambodia - Phum Veal Renh, Prey Nob District in Kampong Som (Isara Chooseri 2007), (Pannetier ms.)
        - Chung of Thailand - Kanchanaburi (Isara Chooseri 2007)
    - Western
      - Chong of Chantaburi (Baradat ms.)
        - Chong həəp (Martin 1974)
        - Khlong Phlu Chong (Siripen Ungsitibonporn 2001)
        - Chong lɔɔ (Martin 1974)
        - Wang Kraphrae Chong (Siripen Ungsitibonporn 2001)
        - Chong (Huffman 1983)
    - Central
      - Samre of Pursat
      - Samre (Pornsawan Ploykaew 2001)
      - Chong (Baradat ms.)
      - Kasong (Noppawan Thongkham 2003), historically called, Chong of Trat (Pannetier ms., Isarangura 1935)
    - Northern (Somray)
      - Somray of Battambang (Baradat ms.)
      - Somre of Siem Reap [nearly extinct] (Moura 1883)

Pearic lexical innovations include 'fish', 'moon', 'water leech', 'chicken', and 'fire'.

== Reconstruction ==
=== Headley (1985) ===
The Proto-Pearic language, the reconstructed ancestor of the Pearic languages, has been reconstructed by Robert Headley (1985). The 149 Proto-Pearic forms below are from Headley (1985).

- *peːm 'angry'
- *pe(ː)ʔ 'three'
- *taːɲ 'to weave'
- *kam 'arrow'
- *keːv 'to call'
- *caː 'to eat'
- *ciʔ 'louse'
- *ʔic 'excrement'
- *ʔan 'here'
- *Pa(ː)ŋ 'flower'
- *Poːt 'to cut, hack'
- *Tɔːŋ 'to fear'
- *Teːv 'right (dexter)'
- *Cak 'to hunt'
- *Ceːv 'to go'
- *Kaːŋ 'month'
- *Kɔːj 'long(time)'
- *Kic 'small'
- *buːl 'drunk'
- *beːt(?) 'knife'
- *baːŋ 'morning'
- *dɔːn 'must'
- *deːv 'to buy'
- *daːk 'water'
- *ɟuːm 'vine'
- *ɟeːv 'soup'
- *ɟɔːr 'sap'
- *graːɲ 'alcohol'
- *gɨl 'to sit'
- *guːm 'to winnow'
- *suk 'hair'
- *saŋ 'to hear'
- *sɔːŋ 'to dance'
- *huːm 'to bathe'
- *hɔː 'not'
- *h(ɨː)r 'to fly'
- *hjɔk 'breast'
- *hmɔːk 'bat'
- *hmaːr 'field'
- *hnoːk 'to stretch oneself'
- *hŋɔːn 'thatch'
- *hrɔːk 'to hide'
- *hlɔːŋ 'banana'
- *hluk 'salt'
- *v(ɛː)ŋ 'raw, uncooked'
- *rəvaːj 'tiger'
- *jaːv 'scorpion'
- *j(i)p 'to come'
- *m(a)t 'eye'
- *nɔːŋ 'mountain'
- *nɨm 'year'
- *ŋ(əː)r 'red'
- *reːs 'root'
- *rɔːj 'fly'
- *raːj 'ten'
- *loːm 'to ask'
- *laːc 'lightning'
- *_liɲ 'elder sibling'
- *Pac 'to break'
- *hoːc 'dead'
- *hoːc 'dead'
- *pah 'to slap'
- *c(u)h 'to spit'
- *tak 'broken apart'
- *lɨk 'bran'
- *-haːm 'blood'
- *tɨm 'to cook'
- *k(eː)n 'child'
- *kɨn 'female'
- *hlɨŋ 'deep'
- *ɟiɲ 'foot'
- *ʔɔːɲ 'to keep, put'
- *Təp 'to bury'
- *h(ɔː)p 'to eat'
- *veːt 'blue'
- *klaːv 'skink'
- *knaːj 'elephant'
- *Tɔːj 'before'
- *sɨl 'sharp-edged'
- *taːl 'to stand'
- *coːl 'to plant'
- *meːl 'fish'
- *Peːr 'water leech'
- *Keːr 'to bark'
- *h(oː)r 'to blow'
- *Ceːs 'kind of deer'
- *loːs 'kind of deer'
- *coːs 'hundred'
- *cɨs 'old'
- *pa(ː)s 'tail'
- *c(ɔ)ʔ 'dog'
- *rəgiʔ 'thin'
- *tŋiʔ 'day'
- *poʔ 'dream'
- *teˀ 'earth'
- *(c)kaː 'mouth'
- *(c)mɨː 'civet'
- *(c)ŋ(ɨ)n 'wife'
- *(c)rɛːŋ 'ring'
- *ɟrəlaʔ 'thorn'
- *kdɔːŋ 'six'
- *kleˀ 'ashamed'
- *klɔːŋ 'bone'
- *kmaːs 'smoke'
- *kmɔk 'cough'
- *gmaʔ 'rain'
- *knɔːk 'to flail'
- *gnuːl 'seven'
- *grɨk 'to awaken'
- *ks(ɨ)m 'star'
- *kvak 'to hook'
- *kjoŋ 'kind of lizard'
- *gjaːŋ 'turtle'
- *ml(ɔː)ŋ 'eel'
- *pliː 'fruit'
- *bluː 'thigh'
- *pnaːk 'basket'
- *bnaːm 'ugly'
- *(p)ŋaːm 'bee'
- *brɔːŋ 'Khmer'
- *braːj 'cotton thread'
- *psiː 'snake'
- *skɛːŋ 'wing'
- *smaɲ 'cramp'
- *snɛːŋ 'after'
- *sŋal 'to know'
- *sriː 'to ask'
- *tmoˀ 'stone'
- *tpɔʔ 'winnowing basket'
- *trɔːj 'wild cow'
- *ʔiːn 'to get'
- *briː 'forest'
- *kriɲ 'drum'
- *ksuː 'red ant'
- *bleːv 'fire'
- *ləkheːt 'to slide'
- *ʔoːc 'to take'
- *Coːj 'sore, wound'
- *Toːs 'head'
- *koːj 'tooth'
- *(m)oːt 'younger sibling'
- *b(oː) 'you'
- *koj 'kind of lizard'
- *hlɛːk 'chicken'
- *Tɛːŋ 'left'
- *bɛːk 'to laugh'
- *tɛ(h) 'lightning'
- *gɔŋ 'long'
- *tɔŋ 'house'

=== Sidwell & Rau (2015) ===
The following Proto-Pearic lexical proto-forms have been reconstructed by Sidwell & Rau (2015: 303, 340-363).

- *ʔɨːs 'all'
- *bɔh 'ashes'
- *ker 'to bark'
- *tkɔːˀ 'bark (of tree)'
- *guŋ 'belly'
- *tak 'big'
- *ciːˀm 'bird'
- *tap 'to bite'
- *caˀŋ 'black'
- *pNhaːm 'blood'
- *klɔːŋ 'bone'
- *j̊ɔk, *tuh 'breast'
- *pɔːs, *tuːt 'to burn (vt.)'
- *ktraːˀs 'claw/nail'
- *juːr 'cloud'
- *saˀc 'cold'
- *jip 'to come/arrive'
- *hoːc 'die (of a person)'
- *cɔː 'dog'
- *taːˀl 'to drink (water)'
- *bah, *jeːˀs 'dry (adj./stat.)'
- *prlaːŋ 'ear'
- *teːˀ 'earth/soil'
- *caː 'to eat'
- *tuŋ 'egg'
- *mat 'eye'
- *pɨːs 'fat/grease/oil'
- *suk 'feather'
- *pliːw 'fire'
- *meːˀl 'fish (n.)'
- *hɨːr 'fly (v.)'
- *ɟɨŋ 'foot'
- *briː 'forest'
- *bɔːŋ 'full (vessel)'
- *ʔɨs 'give'
- *ceːw 'to go'
- toːˀn 'good'
- *weːt 'green'
- *suk 'hair (of head)'
- *tiː 'hand'
- *saŋ 'to hear/listen'
- *soːc, *sroːc 'horn'
- *ʔiɲ 'I'
- *pNhoːc 'to kill'
- *-nuːl, *mkuːr 'knee'
- *kah 'know'
- *-laːˀ 'leaf'
- *bic 'to lie (down)'
- *lɔːm 'liver'
- *goŋ 'long'
- *ciː 'louse (head)'
- *(c/k)lɔːŋ 'man/husband'
- *lɔː 'many'
- *pɔːm, *ɟuːc 'meat/flesh'
- *kaːŋ 'moon'
- *nɔːŋ 'mountain/hill'
- *(c)kaː 'mouth'
- *kɔːk 'neck'
- *blaː 'new'
- *klɛːˀŋ 'night'
- *-toːt, *mu(ː)s 'nose'
- *ʔih 'not'
- *moːˀj 'one'
- *kɟɨm 'person/human'
- *kɔːˀn 'rat'
- *gmaːˀ 'rain'
- *ŋar 'red'
- *ɟar 'resin'
- *kraː 'road, path'
- *reːs 'root (of a tree)'
- *moːl 'round (object)'
- *(g)laːŋ 'sand'
- *daŋ 'see'
- *kɨl 'sit'
- *-loːˀ 'skin'
- *bic 'sleep'
- *kic 'small'
- *kmaː⁽ˀ⁾s 'smoke (n.)'
- *ɲaːj 'to speak, say'
- *taːl 'to stand'
- *ksɨm 'star'
- *tmoːˀ 'stone'
- *(t/s)ŋiːˀ 'sun'
- *heːl 'to swim'
- *paːs 'tail'
- *dan 'that (dist.)'
- *ʔan 'this (prox.)'
- *boː 'thou/you'
- *ɟrlaʔ 'thorn'
- *ktaːˀk 'tongue'
- *koːj 'tooth'
- *neːˀm 'tree'
- *baːˀr 'two'
- *ceːw 'to walk, go'
- *tuːˀ 'warm/hot'
- *daːk 'water'
- *hɛːŋ 'we (excl.)'
- *taːɲ 'to weave'
- *cmpiːˀj 'what?'
- *broːŋ, *pruːs 'white'
- *ʔmih 'who?'
- *kɨn 'woman/wife'
- *joːˀs 'yellow'

== Lexical innovations ==
Paul Sidwell (2015:203) lists the following Pearic lexical innovations that had replaced original Proto-Austroasiatic forms.

Gloss	Proto-Pearic	Proto-Austroasiatic
fish	*meːˀl	*kaʔ
fire	*pliːw	*ʔus
bone	*klɔːŋ	*cʔaːŋ
chicken	*hlɛːk	*ʔiər

Sidwell (2021) subsequently revised the list of Pearic lexical innovations as follows.

Gloss	Proto-Austroasiatic	Proto-Pearic	Kasong	Chong	Samre	Pear of Kompong Thom
‘fish’	*kaʔ	*meːˀw	me̤ː⁴⁵³	me̤ːˀw	miːɹ	miəl
‘fire’	*ʔuːs	*pleːw	ple̤ːw²¹	ple̤ːw	pliːw	phlou
‘bone’	*cʔaːŋ	*klɔːŋ	klɔːŋ³³	klɑːŋ	kluəŋ	–
‘chicken’	*ʔiər	*hlɛːk	lɛːk⁴⁵	læːk	liək	lék
‘banana’	–	*hlɔːŋ	lɔːŋ³³	lɑːŋ	luəŋ	lâng
