= Kaloeng language =

Southwestern Tai language of Thailand and Laos

Kaloeng
- Native to: Thailand, Laos
- Language family: Kra–Dai: Tai; Southwestern (Thai); Lao – Phuthai; Kaloeng
- Writing system: Thai alphabet

Language codes
- ISO 639-3: –

Kaloeng (Kalerng, Kaleung) is a Southwestern Tai language of Thailand and Laos.

== Distribution ==
In Thailand, Kaloeng is spoken in Sakon Nakhon Province, Nakhon Phanom Province, and Mukdahan Province (Trongdee 2016). In Laos, it is spoken in Khammouan Province.

== External classification ==
Mudjalin Luksanawong classifies the Kaloeng language as part of the Sakon Nakhon subbranch of the Southwestern Tai.

- Nakhon Phanom
  - Nakhon Phanom
- Sakon Nakhon
  - Yoy-Yooy-Kalööng
    - Yoy
    - Yooy
    - Kalööng

In the Sakon Nakhon languages, Proto-Tai *hw- and *w- (Pittayaporn 2009:134-135) became /ph/- (Trongdee 2016:55). Also, the Sakon Nakhon languages display the uncommon labiovelar initial clusters thw-, cw-, sw-, hw-, ŋw-, lw-, ʔw- (Trongdee 2016:56).

== Internal classification ==
Thananan Trongdee classifies the Kaloeng dialects as follows according to the evolution of the Proto-Kaloeng diphthong *-aɯ.

- Group 1: *-aɯ > -aɯ (all spoken in Laos)
  - Hinboun District: Pha Wang; Nong Hoi
  - Yommalath District: Phon Bok
  - Nong Bok District: Nong Bok
  - Boualapha District: Kha Yu
  - Kounkham District: Kong Lo
- (branch)
  - Group 2: *-aɯ > -əi
    - Mueang Sakon Nakhon District: Muanglai ม่วงลาย
    - Kut Bak District: Ban Bua บ้านบัว
    - Kusuman District: Saen Phan แสนพัน
    - Khamcha-i District: Non Sang Si
  - Group 3: *-aɯ > -ai
    - Mueang Sakon Nakhon District: Na Yo นายอ; Dong Mafai ดงมะไฟ
    - Phanna Nikhom District: Choeng Chum เชิงชุม
    - Mueang Nakhon Phanom District: Kurukhu กุรุคุ; Khamtoei คำเตย
    - Phon Sawan District: Phon Bok โพนบก
    - Tha Uthen District: Na Sok นาโสก
    - Pla Pak District: Kutakai ปลาปาก
    - Na Kae District: Phra Song พระซอง
    - Yommalath District, Laos: Don Pueai
    - Nong Bok District, Laos: Dong Phak Pue
