= Phrae Pwo language =

Karen language spoken in Thailand

Phrae Pwo
- Northeastern Pwo
- Native to: Thailand
- Ethnicity: Kayah people
- Native speakers: 6,000 (2009)
- Language family: Sino-Tibetan: Tibeto-Burman; Karenic; Pwo; Phrae Pwo
- Writing system: Thai script

Language codes
- ISO 639-3: kjt
- Glottolog: phra1235

Phrae Pwo, or Northeastern Pwo, is a Karen language spoken in Phrae, Lampang, and Chiang Rai provinces of Thailand. It is not intelligible with other varieties of Pwo, though it is close to Northern Pwo.
