= Sa'och language =

Endangered Pearic language of Southeast Asia

Sa'och
- Chung
- Pronunciation: IPA [t͡ɕʰṳˀŋ]
- Native to: Cambodia, Thailand
- Region: Preah Sihanouk, Kanchanaburi
- Ethnicity: 450 (2009)
- Native speakers: 20 in Cambodia (2008); 10 in Thailand
- Language family: Austroasiatic: Pearic; Chong languages; Southern; Sa'och
- Dialects: Chung Yul (Cambodia); Chung Yuy (Thailand)

Language codes
- ISO 639-3: scq
- Glottolog: saoc1239
- ELP: Chu-ng

Sa'och (Khmer pronunciation: [sa ʔoc], also, "Sauch") is an endangered, nearly extinct Pearic language of Cambodia and Thailand spoken only occasionally by a decreasing number of older adults. There are two dialects, one spoken in Veal Renh Village, Prey Nob District, Sihanoukville Province (formerly known as Kampong Som Province), Cambodia and the other in Kanchanaburi Province, Thailand. "Sa'och" is the Khmer exonym for the people and the language. The Sa'och, however, consider this label, which means "scarlet fever" or "pimply" in Khmer, pejorative and use the autonym "Chung" (Sa'och: [t͡ɕʰṳˀŋ]) to refer to themselves and their language.

== Classification ==
Sa'och is an Austroasiatic language. Within the Austroasiatic family, Sa'och is a member of the Pearic languages, a subgroup consisting of a handful of dying languages, including Suoy, Pear, Chong and Samre, spoken by small numbers of ethnic minorities living mostly in far western Cambodia and adjacent areas of Thailand. In traditional classifications, the Pearic languages are most closely related to Khmer dialects, but more conservative schemes place the Pearic subfamily on a level equally distant from all the branches of Austroasiatic.

== History and geographical range ==
After the breakup of the Khmer Empire, the Cambodian central government was weak and neighboring Thailand and Vietnam vied for Cambodian territory. During this time, the Sa'och maintained a semi-autonomous territory centered on Veal Renh in Kampong Saom (modern-day Sihanoukville). According to Sa'och oral history, they prospered along the coast protected by their fortified settlement of Banteay Prey. However, in the 1830s, during the Siamese-Vietnamese War for Cambodia, the Thai army defeated the Sa'och and took many prisoners of war back to Thailand where they were forced to resettle in Kanchanaburi Province along the Thai-Burmese border. This resulted in two disparate communities of Sa'och speakers separated by some 800 km.

The defeat and dispersal of the Sa'och led to a drastic decline in the use of the language. The Sa'och in Cambodia remained along the coast of Kampong Saom, living in their own villages such as Long Leh. The dialect that continued to evolve in Cambodia survived because the Sa'och were able to stay isolated from Cambodians, even through the colonial era, until the Khmer Rouge rule of Cambodia when the vast majority were either killed or relocated and forced to live among Khmers.

The Sa'och in Thailand were first resettled in the Si Sawat District of Kanchanaburi Province in their own villages along the Khwae Yai River. Their dialect evolved in relative isolation in the fertile valley for almost 140 years until construction of the Si Nakharin Dam which, completed in 1980, permanently inundated the valley. In making preparations for the dam, the Thai government again forced the Sa'och to relocate, this time to the gravelly hills above the new reservoir. In their new villages, which were now mixed with Karen, Khmu and Thai, the Sa'och suddenly became minorities resulting in declining language use in favor of Thai. Additionally, young Sa'och are leaving the relatively barren isolated region to find work, causing an additional decline in language use. A paper published in 2009 reported that use of the Chung language in Thailand was only found among older generations remaining in the village and a few small children left in their care.

Both groups of Sa'och call their language simply chung. To differentiate the two dialects, researches have arbitrarily designated the dialect found in Cambodia "Chung Yul" and that of Thailand "Chung Yuy", yul and yuy being their respective words for "sky".

== Phonology ==
Sa'och employs a phonemic inventory typical of modern Mon-Khmer languages and, along with the other Pearic languages, shows some phonological influences from the late Middle Khmer of the 17th century. Like most of the other Austroasiatic languages (outside of Viet-Muong) Sa'och is not a tonal language. However, also similar to the other Pearic languages, Sa'och is marked by an unusual four-way contrast of vocal register, or phonation, in its vowel system.

=== Consonants ===
Sa'och has 21 consonant phonemes. They are listed in table form below.

| | | Labial | Alveolar | | Palatal | Velar | Glottal |
|---|---|---|---|---|---|---|---|
| Plosive | Aspirated | pʰ | tʰ | | cʰ | kʰ | |
| Plosive | Voiceless | p | t | | c | k | ʔ |
| Plosive | Voiced | b | d | | | | |
| Nasal | Voiced | m | n | | ɲ | ŋ | |
| Fricative | Voiceless | | s | | | | h |
| Approximant | Voiced | w | l | ɹ | j | | |

=== Vowels ===
Sa'och contrasts nine vowel qualities which can be either short or long, yielding a total of 18 vowel phonemes. Diphthongs do not occur in native Sa'och words, but the diphthongs /iə/, /ɯə/, and /uə/ may be found in loan words from Thai and Khmer. The vowels of Sa'och are:

| | Front | | Central | | Back | |
| | short | long | short | long | short | long |
|---|---|---|---|---|---|---|
| Close | /i/ | /iː/ | /ɯ/ | /ɯː/ | /u/ | /uː/ |
| Close-mid | /e/ | /eː/ | /ɤ/ | /ɤː/ | /o/ | /oː/ |
| Open-mid | /ɛ/ | /ɛː/ | | | /ɔ/ | /ɔː/ |
| Open | | | /a/ | /aː/ | | |

=== Phonation ===
Similar to other modern and historical Austroasiatic languages such as Middle Khmer, western dialects of Khmu, and the Monic and Katuic languages, Sa'och employs a system of phonemic register in which words contrast according to their phonation, or voice quality. However, unlike these languages, which mostly display a two-way contrast (e.g. between clear and breathy voice), Sa'och and other Pearic languages contrast four different voice qualities.

In a tonal language, an entire syllable carries the tone but in "register" languages, phonation is manifested only on the vowels. The four voice qualities in Sa'och and their transcriptions, using the base vowel /aː/ as an example, are clear voice (/a/), creaky voice (/aːˀ/), breathy voice (/a̤ː/) and breathy-creaky voice (a̤ːˀ).
