= Northern Pwo language =

Karen language of Thailand

Northern Pwo
- Native to: Thailand
- Ethnicity: Kayah people
- Native speakers: (60,000 cited 1983)
- Language family: Sino-Tibetan: (Tibeto-Burman); Karen languages; Pwo; Northern Pwo
- Writing system: Thai script

Language codes
- ISO 639-3: pww
- Glottolog: pwon1235

Northern Pwo, or Phlong, is a Karen language of Thailand. It is not intelligible with other varieties of Pwo, though it is close to Phrae Pwo. Northern Pwo consists of the mutually intelligible dialects of Mae Ping, Omkoi (Hod), and Mae Sarieng.

== Writing system ==
Consonant
ป	ต	จ	ก	อ	บ	ด	พ	ท	ช	ค	ฟ	ซ	ซย	ฆ	ฮ	ณ	ม	น	นย	ง	ย	ว	ล	ร
p	t	ȶ	k	ʔ	b	d	pʰ	tʰ	ȶʰ	kʰ	f	s	ɕ	x	h	ɰ	m	n	ȵ	ŋ	j	w	l	r

Vowel
ี	เ-	แ-	ืฮ	เ-อ	-า	ู	โ-	-อ	ไ-	ีง	เ-ง	ืง	เิง	-าง	ูง	-อง	ิ	เ-ะ	แ-ะ	-ะ	ุ	โ-ะ	เ-าะ	ไ-ะ	ึ	เ-า
i	e	ɛ	ɨ	ə	a	u	o	ɔ	ai	ĩ	ẽ	ɨ̃	ə̃	ã	ũ	ɔ̃	i'	e'	ɛ'	a'	u'	o'	ɔ'	ai'	aɨ'	au'

Tones: ่, ้, ๊.

== Distribution ==
- Chiang Mai, Lamphun, and Tak provinces
- Mae Hong Son province (15–25 villages): Mae Sarieng town, Mae Ngaw along Salween river, from Hot to Mae Sarieng.

== Sources ==
- Phillips, Audra. 2009. Lexical Similarity in Pwo Karen. In PYU Working Papers in Linguistics 5, Audra Phillips (ed.). Chiang Mai, Thailand: Payap University Linguistics Department.
