= Cambodian Sign Language =

Deaf sign language of Cambodia

- Native to: Cambodia
- Region: Phnom Penh
- Native speakers: 7,500 (2015)
- Language family: Deaf-community sign language, connection to Thai Sign Language

Language codes
- ISO 639-3: csx
- Glottolog: camb1244
- ELP: Cambodian Sign Language

Cambodian Sign Language (CBDSL) is an indigenous deaf sign language of Cambodia.

== History ==
Little is known of the language situation prior to the first Cambodian school for the deaf being established in the capital of Phnom Penh in 1997. Although the language of education is American Sign Language, modified to follow Khmer word order, the Deaf community of Phnom Penh has developed their language with the support of the Maryknoll Deaf Development Programme.

== Classification ==
CBDSL shares about 40% of basic vocabulary with Modern Thai Sign Language (MTSL). What intelligibility there is with American Sign Language, apart from iconic elements, is due to vocabulary that is shared among CBDSL, MTSL and ASL. No connection with other languages of neighboring countries has been noted.

== Relevant publications ==
- Harrelson, Erin Moriarty (2019). "Deaf people with 'no language': Mobility and flexible accumulation in languaging practices of deaf people in Cambodia". Applied Linguistics Review. 10 (1): 55–72. doi:10.1515/applirev-2017-0081.
- Murray, Joseph J, Erin Moriarty, Mara Green, Kristin Snoddon, and Annelies Kusters. “Ideology, Authority, and Power.” In Sign Language Ideologies in Practice, 12:333–52. Germany: De Gruyter, Inc, 2020. https://doi.org/10.1515/9781501510090-017.
- Woodward, James; Bradford, Anastasia; Sokchea, Chea; Samath, Heang (2015). "Cambodian Sign Language". Sign Languages of the World. De Gruyter Mouton. pp. 159–176. doi:10.1515/9781614518174-011.
