= Suoy language =

Endangered Pearic language of Cambodia

Suoy
- Su'ung
- Native to: Cambodia
- Region: Kampong Speu
- Native speakers: 860 (2007)
- Language family: Austroasiatic: Pearic; Chong languages; Southern; Suoy

Language codes
- ISO 639-3: syo
- Glottolog: suoy1242
- ELP: Suoy
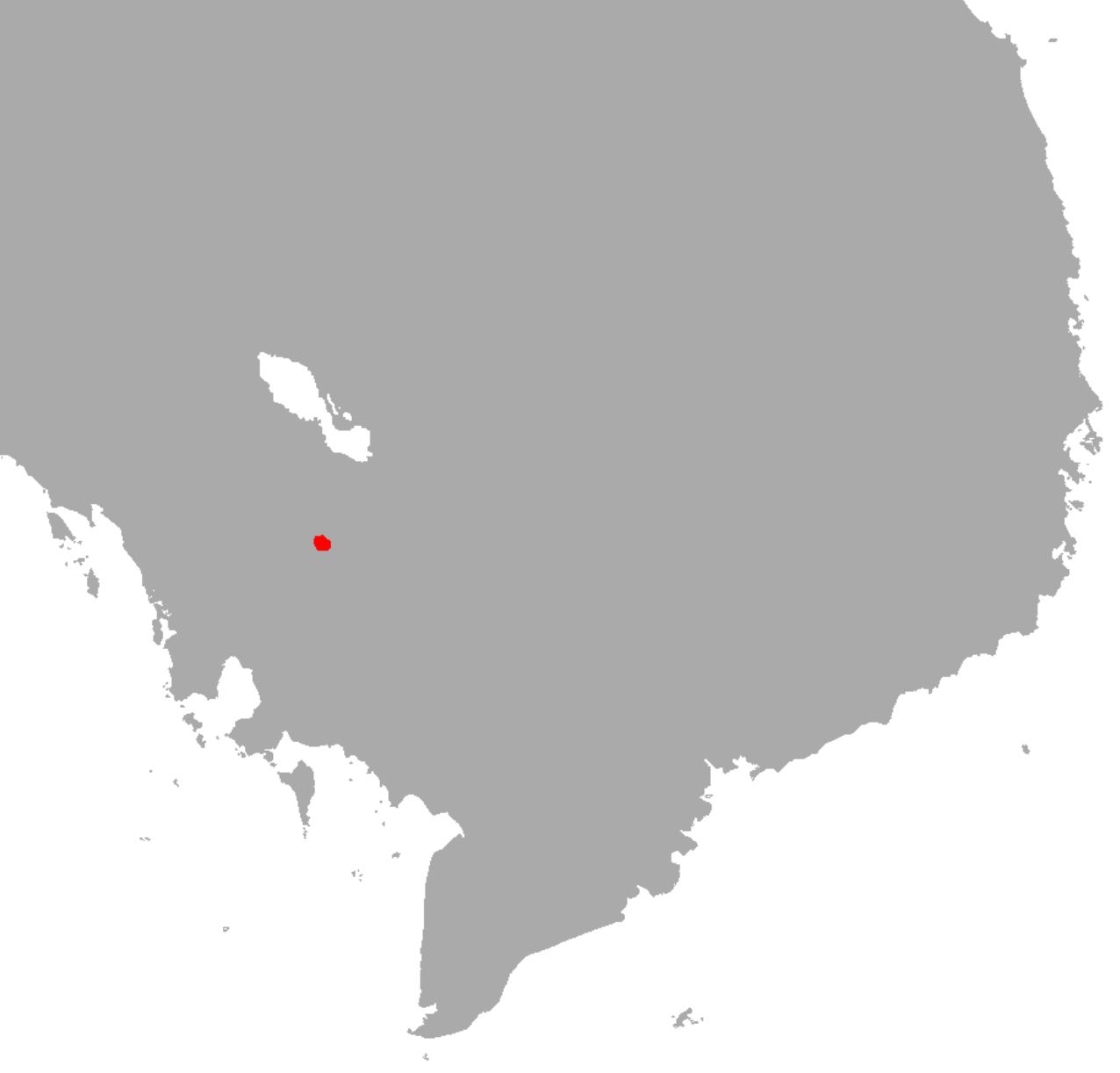

Suoy is an endangered Pearic language of Cambodia spoken by a decreasing number of people, mainly older adults. It is spoken in Kampong Speu Province and Pursat Province, in the Phumi Krang Trachak area (Ethnologue).
