= Pear language =

Austroasiatic language of Cambodia

Pear
- Por
- Pronunciation: [peər]
- Native to: Cambodia
- Region: Preah Vihea (formerly part of Kampong Thom)
- Native speakers: 1,670 (2011)
- Language family: Austroasiatic: Pearic; Pear

Language codes
- ISO 639-3: pcb
- Glottolog: pear1247
- ELP: Pear
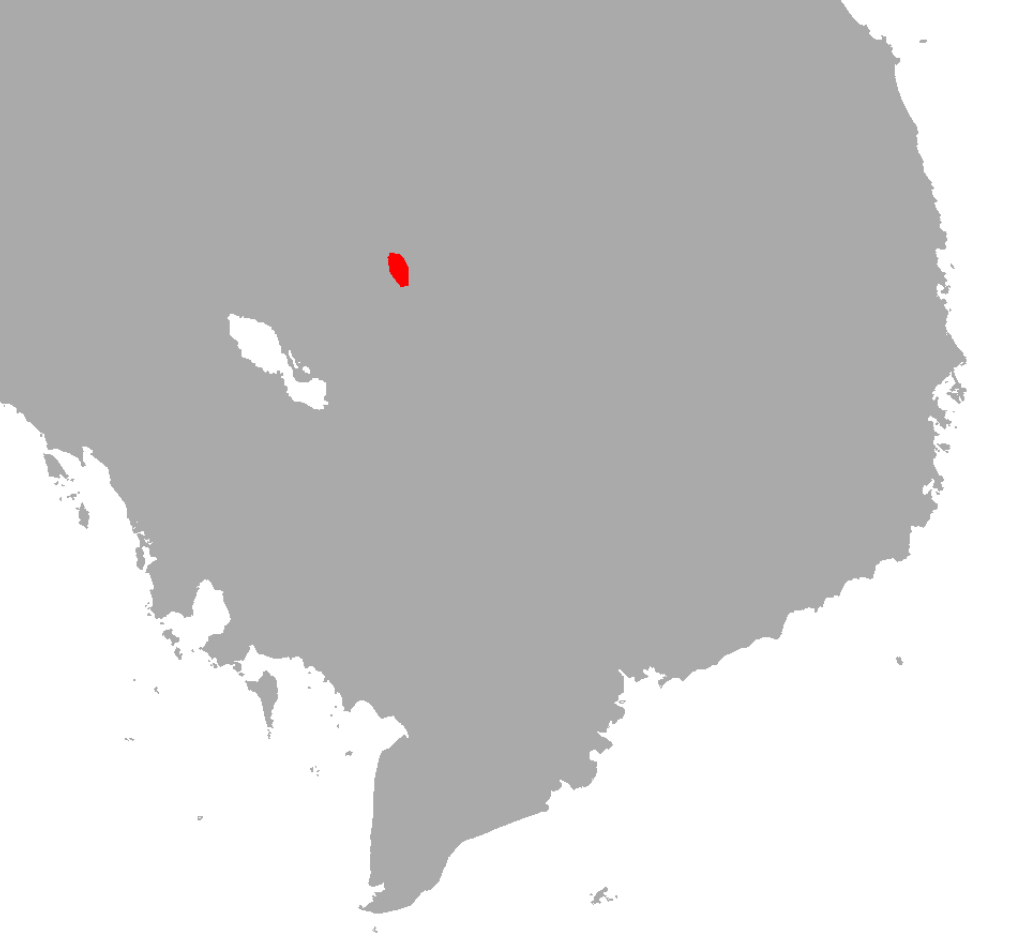

Pear is an endangered Austroasiatic language of Cambodia. "Pear" (French Péâr) is a pejorative term for the historical slave caste of the Khmer, but nonetheless is the usual term in the literature. Pear is spoken in 3–4 villages of Rovieng District, Preah Vihear Province, Cambodia according to Ethnologue.

Sidwell (2009), citing Baradat (ms), considers Pear of Kompong Thom to be the most divergent Pearic language.
