= Pearic peoples =

Total population
- 9,280

Regions with significant populations
- Cambodia: 8,780
- Thailand: 500

Languages
- Pearic languages

Religion
- Animist, Theravada Buddhism

Pearic peoples (/ˈpɛər/; from [ˈpɛə]; also Por) refers to indigenous groups, including the Pear (also known as the Samre), Chong, Samray, Suoy and Sa'och, which speak one of the Pearic languages and live a sparse existence after years of conflict in Cambodia and Thailand. Pearic groups speak different, but closely related, languages and share many cultural traits that differ markedly from the dominant Khmer and Thai cultures.

== History ==
Before their contact with the Khmer rulers, oral tradition provides us with the following outline of the Pearic peoples’ life: in the past, Pearic peoples did not cultivate the land and lived a nomadic and collecting life in the forests; they subsisted on tubers, leaves, flowers, and fruits, as well as palm hearts provided by various palm trees. Using crossbows and arrows poisoned with the sap of the chueh tree (Antiaris toxicaria Lesch.) or various traps, they hunted animals such as deer, elephants, and birds; they also caught small game by hand. Sun-dried or smoked meat, along with fish caught in mountain rivers, provided their protein intake. Condiments and spices came from sour fruits, wild pepper and cardamom seeds. They chewed wild betel leaves and the nuts of the wild areca palm. At that time, the Pear moved in groups whose number could not be accurately estimated, and they built shelters wherever they pleased. It is unknown whether these were small groups limited to kinship and under the authority of a family chief, or larger hordes under the leadership of a designated authority.

A comparison can be made with the information provided by the account of the Chinese traveler Zhou Daguan during his trip to Cambodia in 1296; regarding the Chouang (Chong), he writes: "... this species (of savages) does not dwell in houses; accompanied by their families, they wander in the mountains carrying a clay jar on their heads. If they encounter a wild animal, they kill it with a bow or a spear, make fire from a stone, cook the beast, and eat it communally, then they continue on their way". The Pear, at least those of the Kulen massif — because the author primarily described the Angkor region — would have initially practiced a nomadic lifestyle based on gathering and hunting. This is not dissimilar to the oral tradition of the Pear in the Cardamom Mountains, some of whom are said to have originated from Angkor. It was the establishment of a new state by foreigners to the region, the Khmers from the north, that would have changed their way of life.

The status of Pol Kravanh or "cardamom slaves" probably dates back to the end of the first millennium. Zhou Daguan adds: "In the nearest regions, there are also those who devote themselves to the cultivation of cardamom and cotton trees and who weave fabrics". The author is likely referring to the Sâmré of Mount Kulen who had to pay a cotton tax. At most, the chronicles of the Cambodian kings mention the participation of inhabitants of the Pursat province in military expeditions against Khmers or Siamese. The establishment of the condition of cardamom slaves brought about significant changes in the lives of the Pear of the mountain. They had to, they say, spend two to three months a year gathering cardamom flowers and fruits, and during this period, their food quest became more difficult. But in return, the state provided them with rice; a responsible person was then tasked with collecting the tribute and transmitting it to the provincial mandarin. This led to the grouping of a larger number of individuals under the authority, at least seasonally, of a leader apparently chosen by themselves. It seems that women, children, and the elderly did not participate in the gathering; settled in a base camp, they would have waited for the men to return. This was the beginning of sedentarization. When the work was done, the groups resumed their march through the forest. It was not possible to determine whether the groups formed for cardamom picking remained intact throughout the year or whether they broke up into smaller units to return to nomadism.

It is impossible to pinpoint the beginnings of agriculture among the Pear, however, linking this phenomenon to political transformations in their living conditions seems easier. Several factors come into play simultaneously: seasonal sedentarization; the development, through cultivation, of cardamom plants; contact with the Cambodians. It is likely, as it generally the case, that women, grouped in temporary "villages" with children and the elderly, began to cultivate the land. Tubers, which the Pear consumed heavily, must have first appeared around the houses along with some spices and aromatic plants, some of which were introduced later. As for rice, it is doubtful that it was planted then: it could only have been mountain rice sown in fields obtained by clearing the forest, a predominantly male task that men busy with gathering could not ensure. Unless women brought back from the plains the technique of using marshes for rice growth. Some old Samre claim that in the past, cardamom grew wild in rare places in the massif which, was once called "the land of the nine mountains". According to them, the spread of cardamom was done through cultivation. Among the Samray, the cardamom encountered on the surrounding hills would have been planted; the places where it grows are called “Soun Kravanh” or "Cardamom Gardens", unlike the “Prey Kravanh” or "Cardamom Forests" of the Samre. Among the Chong of Chanthaburi province, the plant was also cultivated. The name Cardamom Mountains may also account for the spread of cardamom by humans and for the importance attached to this wild plant.

== Ethnography ==
Pearic peoples include: Samré in Pursat Province; Samray in Battambang; Chong and Chong-Samré in Trat Province of eastern Thailand; and Chong la and Chong heap, in Chanthaburi Province, Thailand.

In the Pear communities in Preah Vihear Province, the Pear population was estimated to be 299 households (1,674 persons) in 2002.

According to the Pear Samray people of Kranhung, the Kulen hill region's Samray survived because of emigration in the days of the Angkor kingdom. After the 1967 revolt of Samlaut, Pear of the Stung Kranhung area moved to Ta Sanh.

While some Sa'och live in Cambodia's coastal area, many Sa'och from the Kampong Som area were taken captive by the Thais in the 1830s and resettled in Kanchanaburi Province, Thailand.

The Chong (or Chhong) are Pearic peoples who live in both Thailand and Cambodia, In Thailand, Chong inhabit Trat Province and Chanthaburi Province. As of 2014, the Chong in Koh Kong Province, Cambodia are seeking to prevent construction of the Cheay Areng Dam, which would displace local residents. Chong people in Southern Cardamom National Park were displaced by a REDD+ carbon offset project between 2018 and 2023.

Pearic peoples traditionally cultivate upland rice by the swidden method.

They follow traditional religions.

== Language ==
The people speak the endangered group of Pearic languages. Gérard Diffloth (1992) states that the language and customs of the Pear are radically different from other social groups in Cambodia.
