= Neidi =

Neidi (內地) is a Chinese term which can refer to:

- China proper
- Mainland China

== See also ==
- Names of China
