= 中国 (disambiguation) =

中国 or 中國 (lit. 'middle kingdom' or 'middle country') most commonly refers to China. It may also refer to:

- Chūgoku region, an area of Japan
- Zhongyuan, the Central Plain of China

== See also ==
- Names of China
