= Four-goat Square Zun =

Ancient Chinese zun

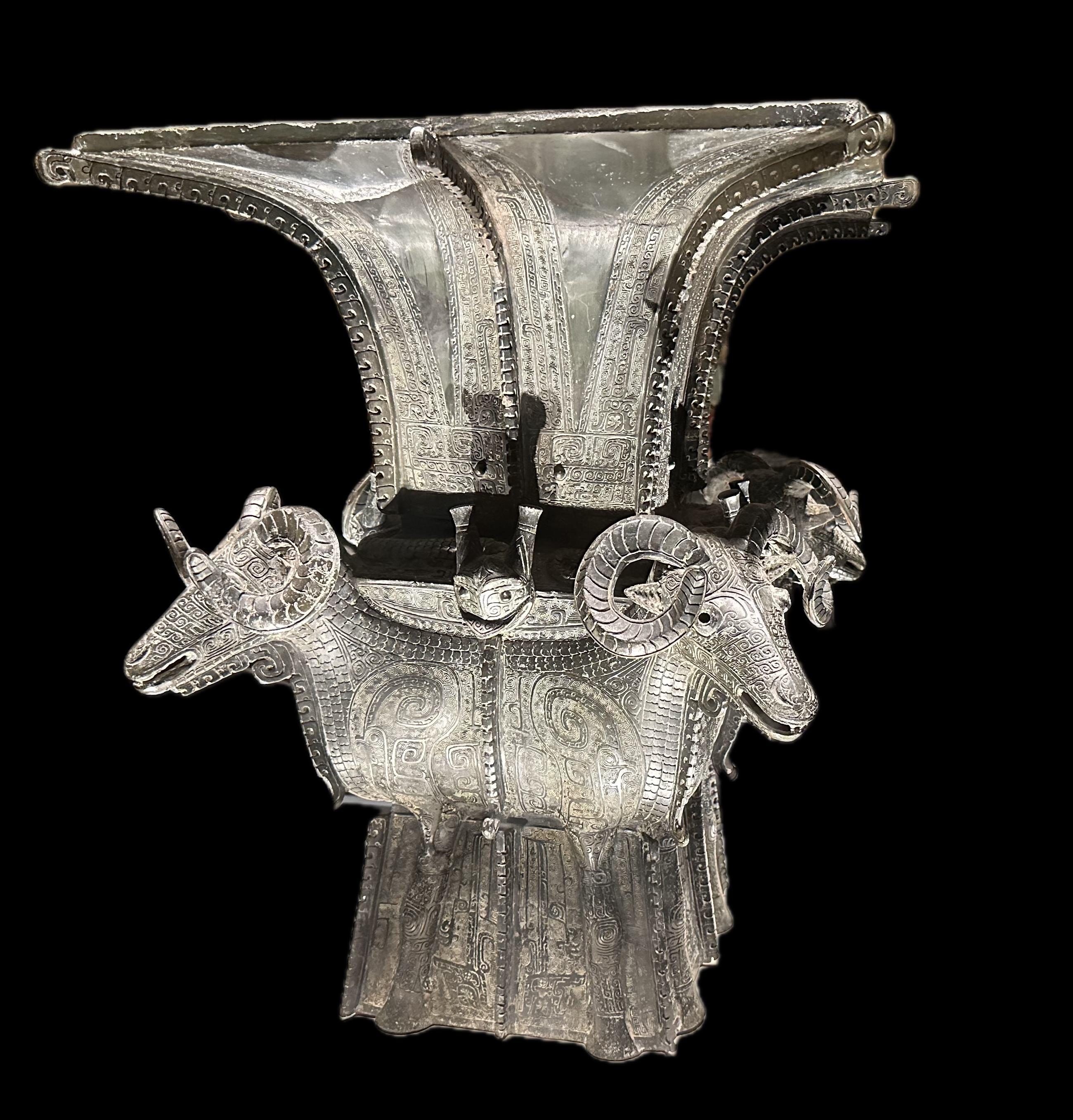
- Material: Bronze
- Height: 58.3 cm
- Created: c. 1000 BC
- Discovered: April 1938; Changsha, Hunan, China
- Discovered by: Jiang Jingshu
- Present location: Beijing, China

The Four-goat Square Zun (Chinese: 四羊方尊; pinyin: Sì Yáng Fāng Zūn) is an ancient Chinese ritual bronze zun vessel. It is more than 3,000 years old from the era of late Shang dynasty (11th – 10th century BC), and famous for its shape, each of the four sides of the belly has a big horn-curled goat. It was unearthed in Huangcai Town, Ningxiang County in Hunan Province, and is exhibited at the National Museum of China.

== Dimension and significance ==
The Four-goat Square Zun is 58.3-centimetre (23.0 in) high and weighs 34.5-kilogram (76 lb), the biggest square zun from the Shang dynasty (c. 1600–1046 BC) so far. The mouth of its vessel extends outwards forming an extremely big square mouth. The bottom is supported by ring feet (圈足支座) and the middle part was skillfully engraved with four goats with big curly horns. The four goats stand facing in four directions, looking serene and calm. Four high relief entwining dragons are on the shoulders of the square zun. A pair of horns and heads of the dragons respectively extends out of the surface of the square zun.

== Discovery ==
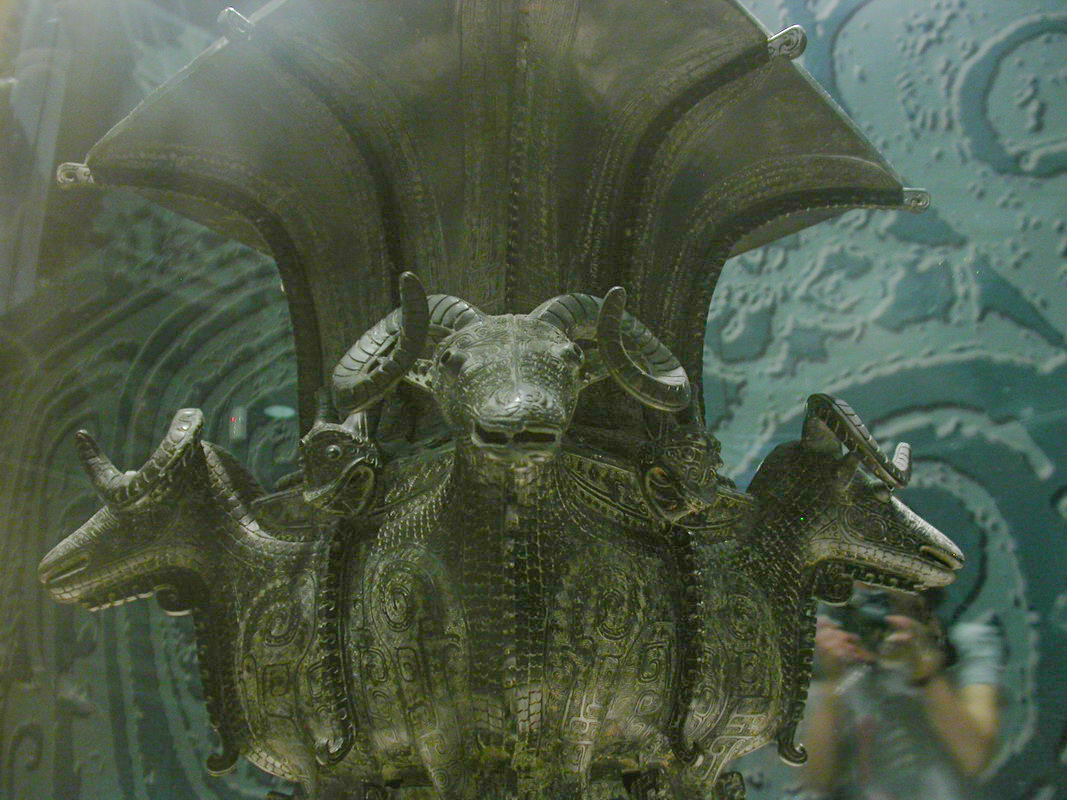
Detail

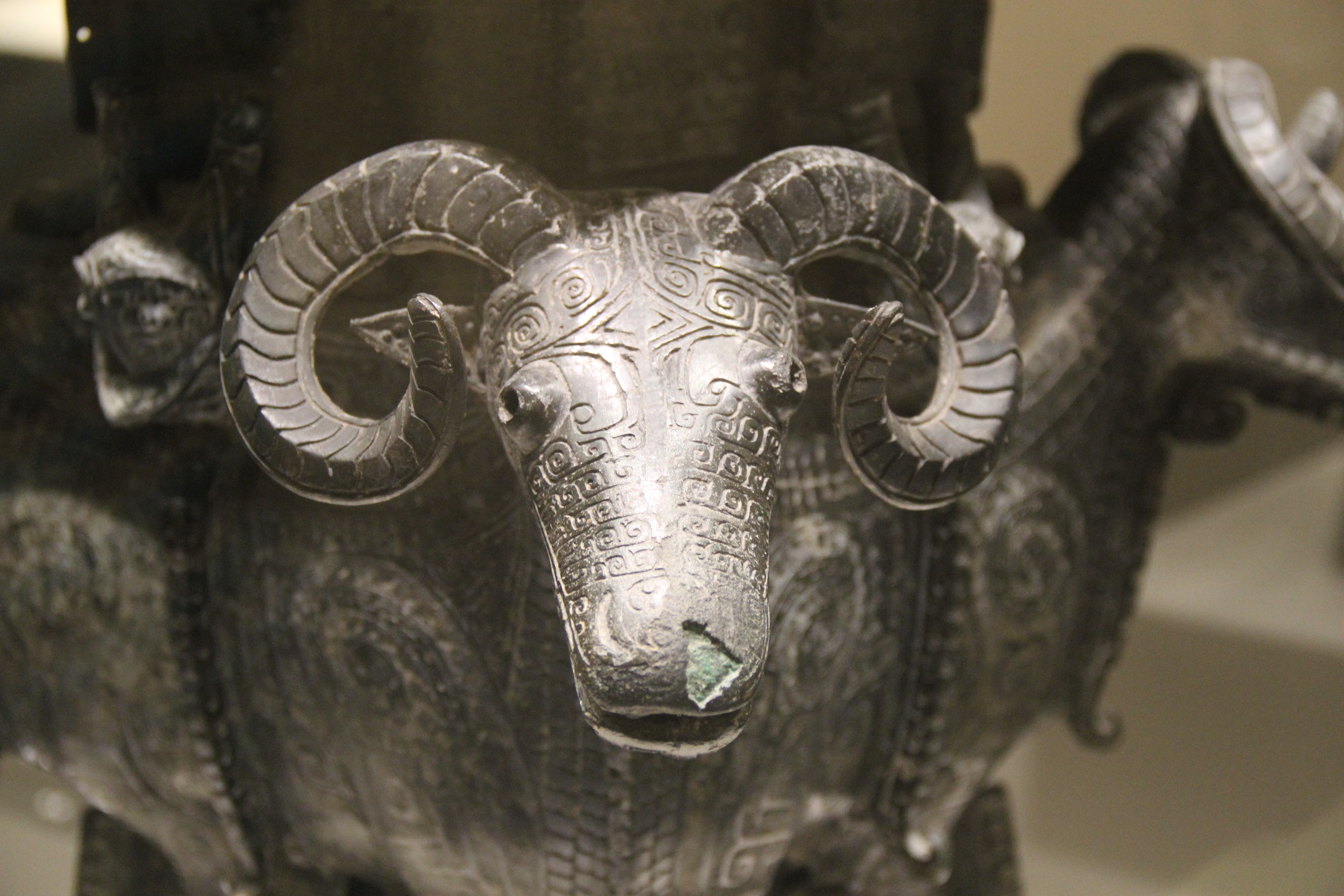
Detail of a ram's head

In April 1938, when Jiang Jingshu (姜景舒) and his brothers Jiang Jingqiao (姜景桥) and Jiang Xiqiao (姜喜桥) living in Yueshanpu (月山铺), Huangcai Town, Ningxiang County, Hunan Province were digging to plant sweet potatoes on the mountain, they felt something hard with their hoes. It occurred to them that they also felt something hard here last year. At that time, they ignored it as they thought it might be a stone. Unexpectedly, they felt it with their hoes again that day. Therefore, they decided to move away the stones in the way. When they first hoed it, they heard a crash, then a sheet of rusty copper about 10-centimetre (3.9 in) long and 8-centimetre (3.1 in) wide flew out of the soil. One side of it was fresh, while the other side was rusty with some dim lines and patterns on its surface. They continued digging and a national treasure that had been sleeping soundly underground for more than 3,000 years gradually showed its magnificent appearance. The object was later named "Four-goat Square Zun". After Jiang Jingshu and his brothers unearthed the square zun, they didn't take it home until it was dark in order not to be found by others. However, although it was dark then, the big and heavy square zun still drew people's attention all the way through the night.

The news spread and before long, many antique dealers cast covetous eyes on it. The owner of Wanlishan Shop (万利山货号) in Huangcai Town was one of them. When he heard the news, then he quickly took silver dollars and came to see the square zun with his servants that very night. He bought it with 400 silver dollars immediately and transferred it to his home. After the owner of Wanlishan Shop got the square zun, he secretly sent one of his servants to go to Changsha at once to contact Zhao Youxiang (赵佑湘), the owner of Yifengxiang Cow Leather Shop (怡丰祥牛皮商号) in Xipailou Street of Changsha city. Zhao opened a cow leather shop on the surface but he secretly engaged in reselling antiques at a profit. He invited Zhao to have a look. After he saw the square zun, he decided to buy it instantly. The owner of Wanlishan Shop offered a low price for such a valuable piece of art: 10,000 silver dollars. However, Zhao couldn't get so much money in such a short period. So he consulted with the owner of Wanlishan Shop whether he could leave the square zun for him and he would go back to raise money at once. The owner of Wanlishan Shop agreed with him, but the period was only three days.

When Zhao returned to Changsha, exactly three people came round, they were all connoisseurs of antiques and were in the antique industry of Changsha. When he saw the three people, a good idea suddenly struck him, he could buy the square zun with their help. So he showed the square zun to them in detail. The four came to an agreement to buy the square zun together. It was said that soon after they sent the square zun back to Changsha, they secretly spread the news that they planned to resell the square zun with the starting price of 200,000 silver dollars though cultural relic vending channels. The Changsha County Government soon learned the news. In order to prevent the national treasure from being lost overseas and possibly destroyed, the government immediately sent police to investigate the matter and finally impounded the square zun. Soon after that the square zun was submitted to Hunan Provincial Government and was transferred to Hunan Provincial Bank for safe keeping.

In November 1938, the Imperial Japanese Army attacked Changsha, the Hunan Provincial Government and Hunan Provincial Bank were moved to Yuanling County. Before long, in a Japanese air attack, the bank was bombed by the aircraft. The building was razed to the ground. After the victory of the Second Sino-Japanese War, the bank was moved back to Changsha. Due to the haste, the square zun was transferred to the warehouse of waste products and was left there. Over time, the matter was forgotten.

After the founding of the Communist State, Premier Zhou Enlai gave an instruction to look for the square zun, but no information about it was found. One day in 1952, the Cultural Relics Management Committee of Hunan received a report that some cultural relics had been found in the Hunan Branch of People's Bank of China. The Cultural Relics Management Committee of Hunan sent expert Cai Jixiang (蔡季襄) and others to the scene. Cai checked and accepted the cultural relics found hidden in the waste products. Suddenly, he noticed a big wooden box in the corner of a wall. When he opened the wooden box carefully with the help of several people, he saw a big bronze goat head. Cai contacted expert Zhang Xinru (张欣如), a leading master of cultural relics restoration in China to restore the square zun to its original appearance.

In 1959, the Four-goat Square Zun was transferred to National Museum of Chinese History for exhibition to celebrate the 10th year of the National Day. Later, the National Museum of Chinese History gave the relic to the National Museum of China. The Four-goat Square Zun has been kept there since that time.
