= He zun =

Ancient Chinese artefact

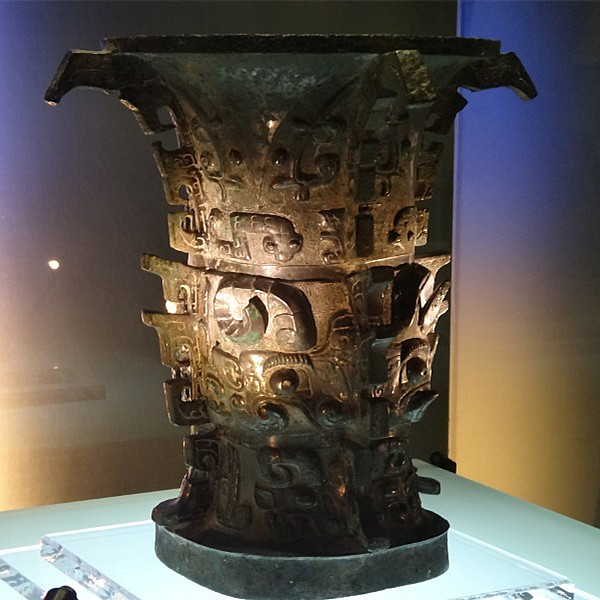
- Material: Bronze
- Size: 38.8 cm tall, 28.8 cm in diameter
- Weight: 14.6 kg
- Created: 1038 BCE – c. 1000 BCE
- Discovered: 1963; Baoji, Shaanxi, China; 34.363°N 107.238°E

Location
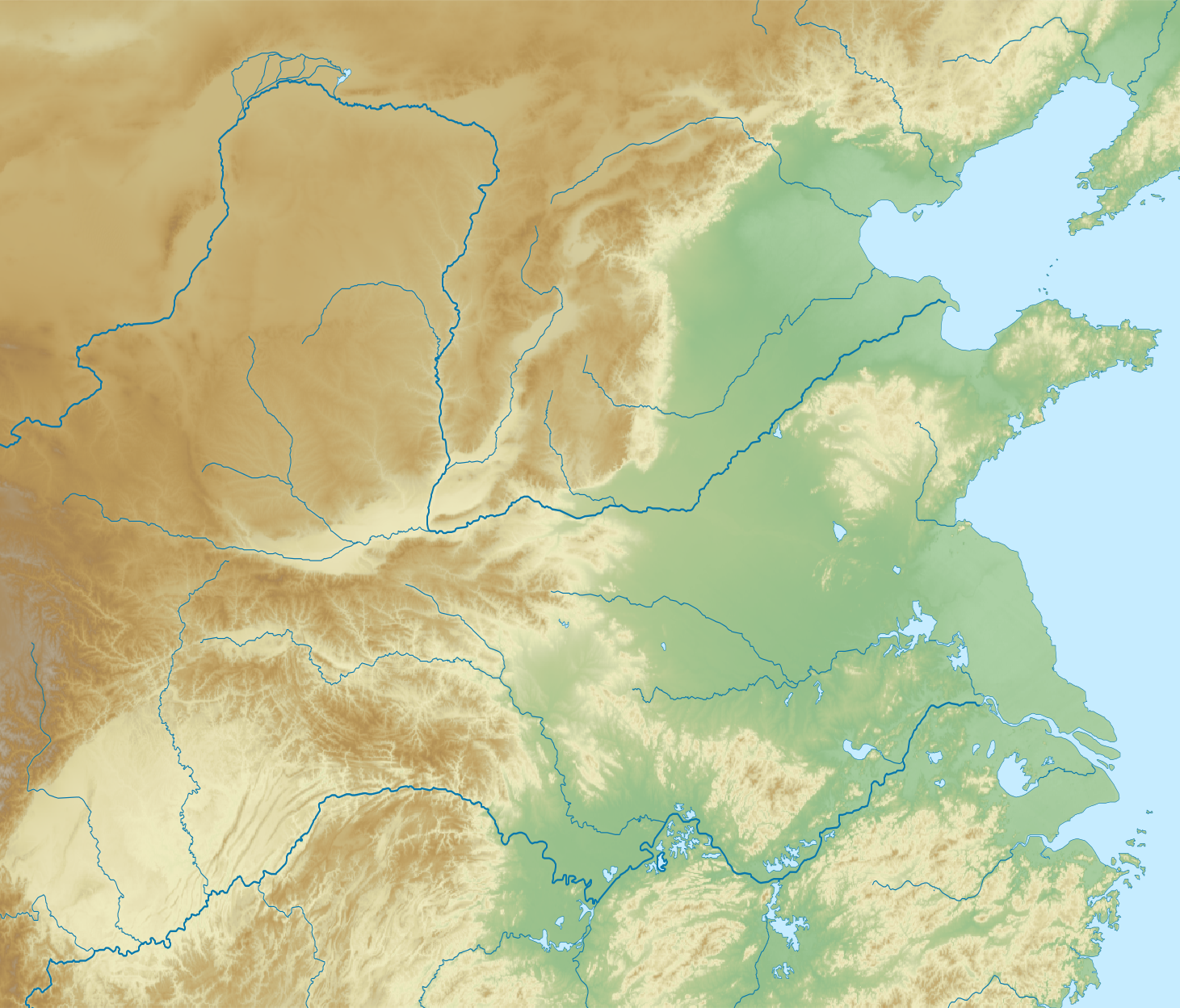

The He zun (Chinese: 何尊) is an ancient Chinese ritual bronze vessel of the zun shape. It dates from the era of Western Zhou (1046–771 BC), specifically the early years of the dynasty, and is famous as the oldest artifact with the written characters meaning "Middle Kingdom" or "Central State" — 中國: "China" — in a bronze inscription on the container. Today it is in the Baoji Bronzeware Museum in Shaanxi.

== Dimension and significance ==
The vessel, dating to the 5th year of the reign of King Cheng of Zhou, is 38.8 cm (15.3 in) tall, 28.8 cm (11.3 in) in diameter and weighs 14.6kg. Inside the container, at the base, it contains 12 rows of 122 inscribed Chinese characters. Of the 122 characters, 119 are identified while 3 are unknown. The inscription contains the words <宅𢆶𠁩或> inscribed in early Zhou script. The character (𠁩) is a variation of 中 meaning central, as defined by the Shuowen Jiezi: "The Supreme Ultimate is the Great Center (大中). It is curved but does not lose the center"; (或) carries the meaning of a territory (疆域) or a state. The phrase can be transcribed in modern form as 宅茲中國; zhái zī zhōngguó, referring to the "central region" of the newly expanded Zhou dynasty political domain. It can be viewed as the earliest occurrence in the Chinese corpus of the word 中國, which gradually expanded in its meaning over the next millennium. The He zun is also the earliest known vessel bearing the character de (德, "virtue"), and one of only 64 historical artifacts that can never leave Chinese soil.

== History ==
The construction of the city of Luoyi (洛邑 or 雒邑) is documented in two chapters of the Classic of History. The inscription of this vessel supports the textual claim. The record shows King Cheng of Zhou established his residence in Chengzhou (成周) in his 5th year. Most scholars consider this was the 5th year after Duke of Zhou handed over the government.

The inscription is (in liding characters and with modern punctuation added):

隹王初𨟦宅于成周，復爯武王豊，祼自天，才亖月丙戌，王𫌲宗小子于亰室，曰：「昔才爾考公氏，克𬩂玟王，𢑩玟王受𢆶大命。隹珷王既克大邑商，𠟭廷吿于天，曰：『余𠀠宅𢆶𠁩或，自之辥民。』烏虖，爾有唯小子亡戠，𧠟于公氏，有𫤼于天，𬴲令，茍亯𢦒。叀王龏徳谷天，順我不每。」王咸𫌲。𣄰易貝卅朋，用乍𫭌公寶𱀵彝，隹王五祀。

The inscription has been translated as follows:

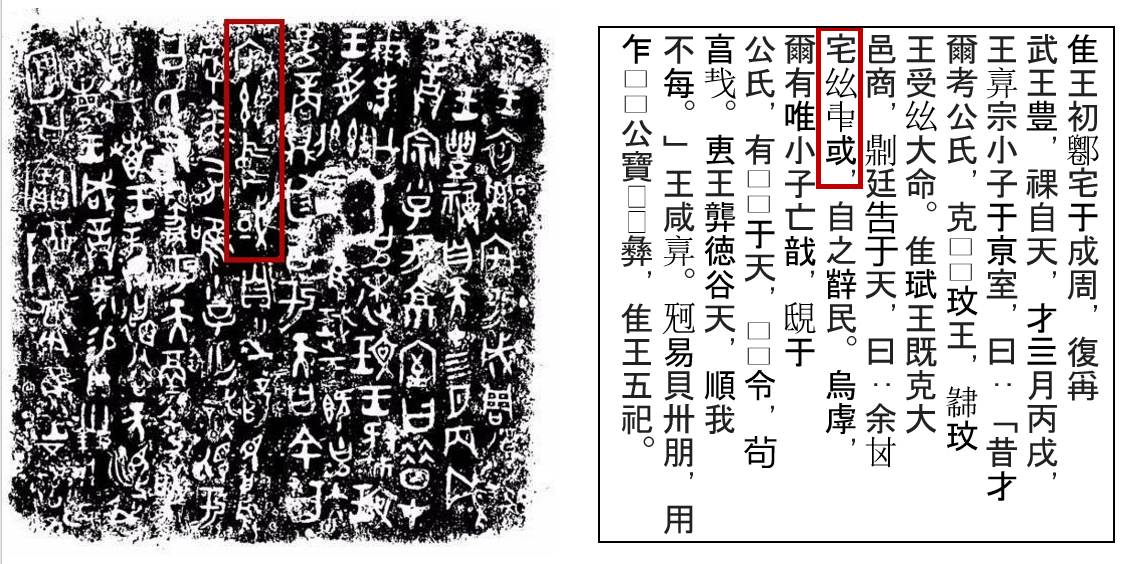
He Zun rubbing and transcription; framed is the phrase 宅𢆶𠁩或 zhái zī zhōngguó "living in the centre of the realm"

It was when the King began laying out his seat at Chengzhou. [The King] returned from extolling King Wu in the Feng sacrifice, with sacrificial meat from the [Hall of] Heaven. In the fourth month, on day bingxu, the king exhorted the scions of the royal clan in the ancestral temple, saying: "In the past, your fathers were able to aid King Wen, whereupon King Wen received this [Great Command]. When King Wu conquered the great city Shang, he then made reverent declarations to Heaven, saying: "Let me dwell in this, the central region, and from here govern the people." Hark! While you are still minors lacking understanding, look to your fathers' scrupulous respect for Heaven. Comprehend my commands and respectfully follow orders! [Your] sovereign's reverential virtue finds favour with Heaven, which guides me in my slow-wittedness." The King's exhortation having finished, [vessel maker] He was presented with the thirty strings of cowries used to make this treasured sacrificial vessel for [his father] Sire [X]. It was the King's fifth year."

— Translation by David W. Pankenier.

== Discovery ==
The lost artifact was discovered by a Chen family of Jia Village, northeast of Baoji. Behind their house in Baoji was a 3 metre tall cliff. One cubic metre of the piece was sticking out from the soil. In 1963, the second son of the family dug out the piece thinking that someone might be hurt by the protruding part. The piece revealed a taotie design. The family did not grasp the value of the vessel, using it as a food storage container at home. On August 8, 1965, the family struggled with financial difficulties and sold the piece as scrap metal in Baoji for 30 yuan.

In September 1965, a worker in the waste center informed an expert about the bronze piece. The expert recognised it as a Zhou dynasty artifact and brought it back to a museum. In 1975, near the end of the Cultural revolution, the State Administration of Cultural Heritage sent the piece to the Shaanxi relic bureau. Ma Chengyuan, a bronze expert at the Shanghai Museum, recognised its significance.

In 1976, the PRC cultural bureau organised an art exhibition to the United States. The US requested this piece join the exhibit and offered a US$30 million protection coverage.

== See also ==
- Names of China
