= Zun =

Type of Chinese ritual bronze or ceramic wine vessel

- zun in oracle bone script
- Chinese: 尊
Transcriptions
Standard Mandarin
- Hanyu Pinyin: zūn
- Wade–Giles: tsun^{1}
- IPA: [tswə́n]
Yue: Cantonese
- Yale Romanization: jyūn
- Jyutping: zyun1
- IPA: [tsyn˥]
Middle Chinese
- Middle Chinese: t͡suən
Old Chinese
- Zhengzhang: *ʔsuːn

Alternative Chinese name
- Chinese: 彝
Transcriptions
Standard Mandarin
- Hanyu Pinyin: yí
- Wade–Giles: i^{2}
- IPA: [ǐ]
Yue: Cantonese
- Yale Romanization: yìh
- Jyutping: ji4
- IPA: [ji˩]
Middle Chinese
- Middle Chinese: yij
Old Chinese
- Zhengzhang: *li

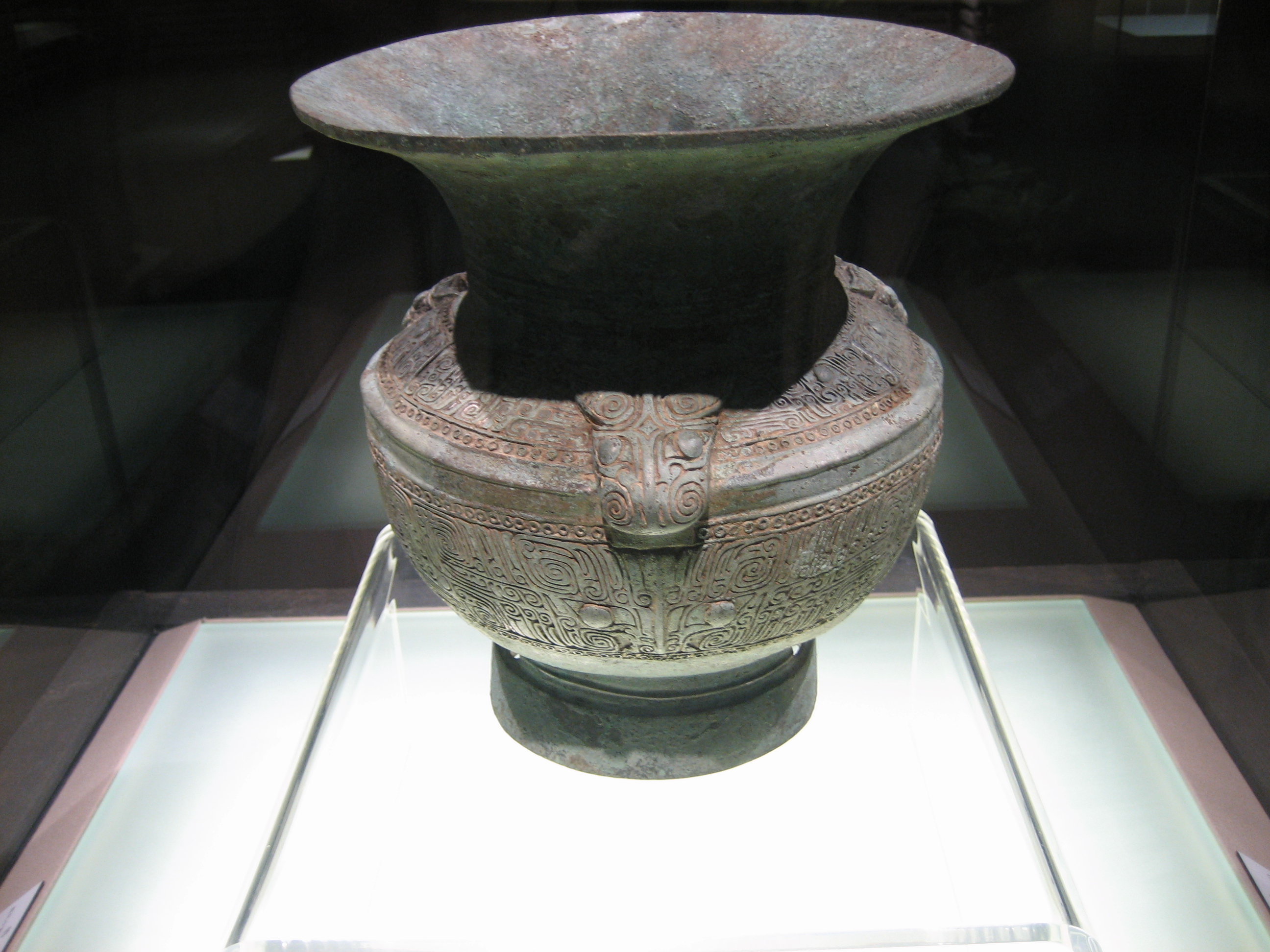
A zun with taotie dating to the Shang dynasty

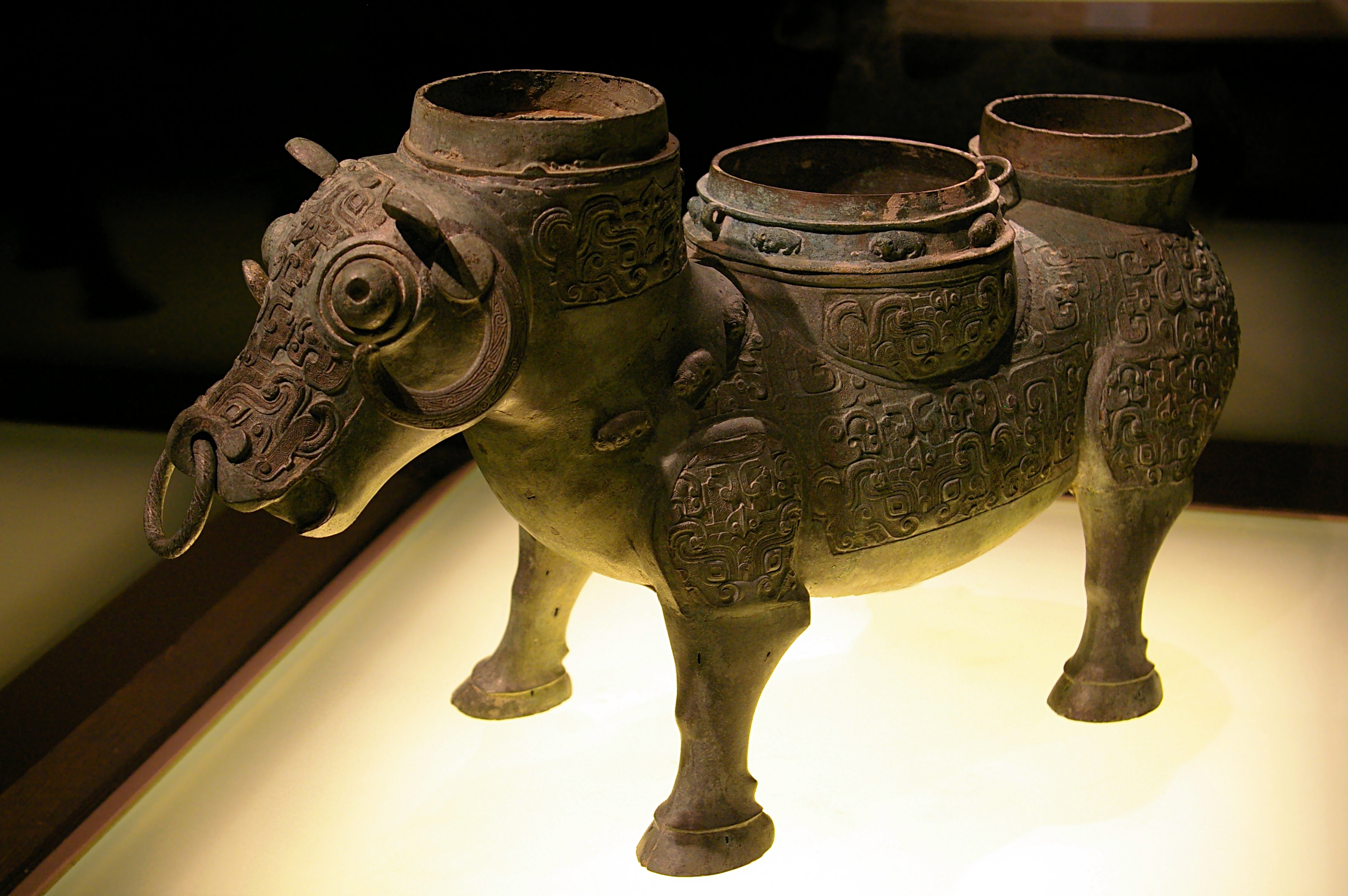
A rare Xi zun in the shape of an ox

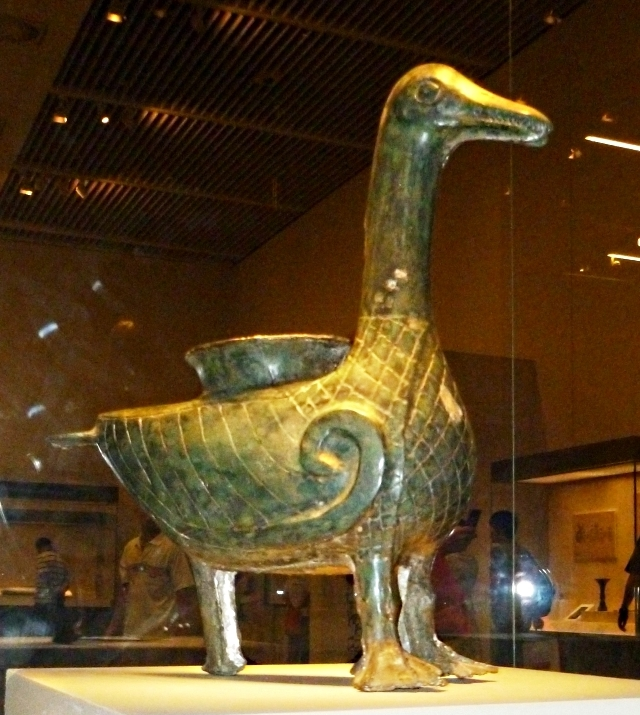
Western Zhou goose-shaped bronze zun. National Museum of China

The zun or yi, used until the Northern Song (960–1126) is a type of Chinese ritual bronze or ceramic wine vessel with a round or square vase-like form, sometimes in the shape of an animal, first appearing in the Shang dynasty. Used in religious ceremonies to hold wine, the zun has a wide lip to facilitate pouring. Vessels have been found in the shape of a dragon, an ox, a goose, and more. One notable zun is the He zun (Chinese: 何尊) from the Western Zhou.

== Function and use ==
The zun is a vessel used as a ritual container to hold wine in ancient Chinese. It is a tall wine cup, with no handles or legs. The mouth of the vessel is normally seen as broader than the rest of the body. As a ritual container, its function is to provide the offering of wine to the deceased through ceremonial practices. Depending on the type of zun vessel, for example the Xi zun (犧尊 or 獻尊), not only was it used to store wine but also used to keep the wine warm. This is the only bronze piece discovered known to combine the two functions.

== Symbolism ==
The zun comes in various shapes, notably as a round or square vase-like form. Through these forms they appear in unique shapes varying different animals. Often, these vessels are found with distinctive and defined decor with unique symbolism. The most noticeable symbol through the decor is the taotie, known as the demon-face or the face of a sacrificial animal in early Chinese art. This type of face is a common motif found in Chinese ritual bronzes during the Shang dynasty. It has also been defined as a mask, vividly shown as two symmetrical bodies that are joined together. The most visible feature of the mask on the vessel is the protruding animal eyes projecting from the bronze surface in which stares at the viewer. These protruding eyes has also been defined as the eyes of a predator. These animal designs are also iconographically meaningful as the images of the various animals that served as the helpers of shamans and shamanesses (who were believed to have mythical powers) in the tasks of Heaven-Earth, and with the dead-living communication.

== Ceramic forms ==
The zun can be seen in a variety of different vessel forms from a limited amount of decoration to detailed. Some are square, some cylindrical while others are modeled after animals. Some of the animals they are modeled after are an elephant, ox, sheep, horse, rhinoceros and a bird. The basic shape used throughout many is cylindrical and the shape itself is repeated but with modifications. Some Zuns are tall and slender while others may be short and round. The decoration used on the vessels varies not only in content but the relief height. The height of the relief may give off the impression of texture or it may emphasize the form of the vessel by being smooth and round like the vessel. The taller vessel forms may have flanges on the sides that start at the upper lip and follow down to the foot of the vessel.

== Historical and cultural references ==
Some characteristics of early Shang zuns consisted of a flaring mouth, high neck and a large body. Shang zuns also had wide shoulders and a foot ring. During the early Western Zhou, there was a zun modeled after a gu but was thicker, larger and the body portion is swelled more than that of a gu. Flanges appear on the vessels body and neck while the same decoration is used. The shoulders consist of small animal heads. Late Shang to Early Zhou Zuns are slim. The flanges start from the mouth of the vessel and down the body ending before the foot ring. The flanges are identical showing symmetry. Early Western Zhou zun are shorter, rounder and smoother. The relief of the vessel emphasizes the form removing the flanges. The bird motif is more prominent now than in the previous vessels.

== Important examples ==
=== Four-goat Square Zun ===
Period: Shang dynasty
Overall Height: 58.3 cm
Weight: 34 kg
Location: National Museum of China, Beijing

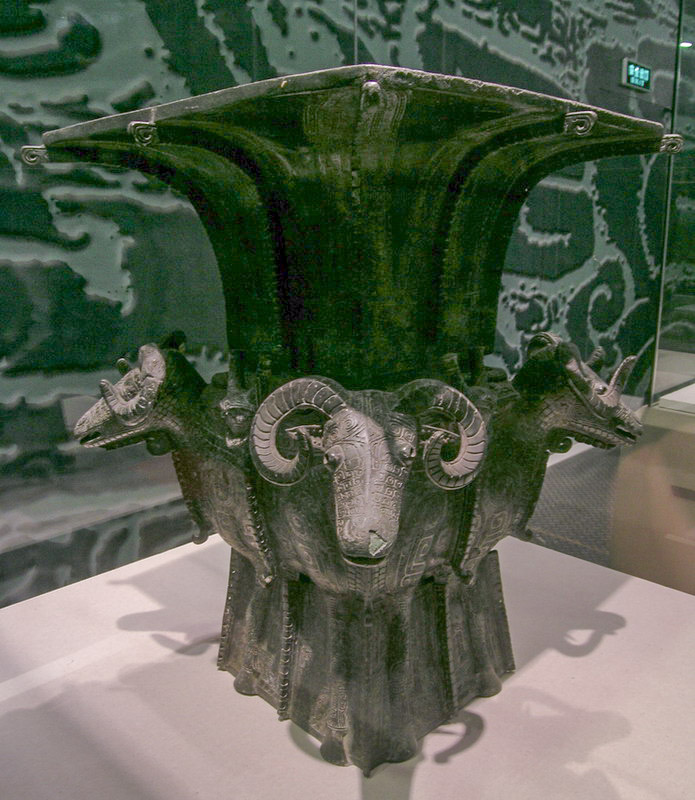

The square zun was excavated in 1938 from Yueshanpu, Ningxiang, Hunan Province. It has a generous mouth with a flared flat lip, a long neck, projecting shoulder, shallow belly and high ring foot. There are flanges on the four corners and in the middle of all four sides. The neck has a design of triangular one-legged dragons and the flanges become the noses of the animal face designs below, with curly horns, round protruding eyes and a scrolled tail. On the shoulder are high-relief designs of dragons with their three-dimensional heads on the centre and their bodies wriggling along the sides. On the four corners of the shoulder are four protruding rams’ heads with curly horns, the belly of the vessel forming their chests and their legs extending down the ring foot. Their heads have engraved thunder patterns while there are scales on their chests and backs. Both sides are decorated with an elegant design of a bird with a high crest. The ring foot also carries a design of one-legged dragons. This vessel combines the techniques of engraving, high relief and three-dimensional relief in a dignified and refined form with intricately worked designs. It is a perfect fusion of moulding and artistic design representing the very best of bronze-making by the traditional clay mould technique.

=== Fu Hao owl-shaped Zun ===
Period: Late Shang dynasty
Overall Height: 46.3 cm
Mouth Wide: 16.1 cm
Location: National Museum of China, Beijing

It was excavated in 1976 from the tomb of Fu Hao, Anyang, Henan Province. This bronze wine vessel with the design of owl, a ferocious bird, belongs to those with bird and beast designs. The whole vessel uses thunder pattern as the background, the beak and breast carry cicada pattern, the two sides of the neck carry the Kui pattern (Kui is a legendary dragon with one horn and one foot), the wings carry snake pattern and the tail has the design of a flying owl. The whole piece has rich, delicate and diverse patterns. In appearance, this owl looks solemn and powerful with its two legs and tail form a triangle support the vessel. The shape is firm and lifelike. It is a perfect combination of plane and three-dimensional designs. Inside the vessel's mouth are two inscribed characters “Fuhao”, the name of a woman. The oracle inscriptions during the reign of the King Wuding of the Shang Dynasty have many records about this woman. Being the wife of the king, Fuhao involved herself in major state affairs, participated in wars, and presided over sacrificial ceremonies. She led troops to conquer many parts of the country, thus enjoying an illustrious status and being a legendary figure.

=== Dragon and tiger Zun ===
Period: Late Shang dynasty
Overall Height: 50.5 cm
Diameter at mouth: 44.7cm, Diameter at foot: 24 cm

It was excavated in 1957 from Yueyahe, Funan, Anhui Province. This is a tall and large zun, with a trumpet-shaped mouth, girded neck, broad sloping shoulder, belly which narrows at the bottom, and a high ring foot. The neck is decorated with three narrow bands, the shoulder with three protruding wriggling dragons with upright conical horns, open mouths, extended bodies and coiled tail. Behind their tails is another small dragon design. The belly has a design of a tiger, with raised head in high relief and bodies in shallower relief, extending on both sides of the head. Below the tiger's head is a squatting man with arms raised above his shoulders, his head inside the jaw of the tiger. Below both designs is an animal face design with the corner flange of the vessel forming its nose, T-shaped horns and a scrolled tail. The ring foot has three cross-shaped piercings and, on the lower part, animal face designs. The mixture of the techniques of engraving, high relief and three-dimensional relief on the shoulder and belly combined with the delicate and beautiful designs make this a masterpiece of Shang bronze work. In ancient times, non-Chinese peoples lived in Huaiyi Region, where this piece was excavated, and it shows the influence of Shang bronzes combined with local features.

=== Ritual wine container (zun) with masks, dragons, and birds ===
Period: Late Shang dynasty, Middle Anyang period, ca. 12th century B.C.E.
Overall Height: 36.6 cm
Wide: 37.4 cm
Weight: 34 kg
Location: Freer Gallery of Art F1951.19

This example probably excavated from Anyang, Henan province, China. And it used to belong to C.T. Loo & Co., New York, from at least May 11, 1949. Then Freer Gallery of Art purchased it from C. T. Loo on November 28, 1951.

=== Zun with dragons ===
Period: Western Zhou dynasty
Overall Height: 20.5 cm
Wide: 17.5 cm
Location: Freer Gallery of Art F1911.40, purchased from C.T. Loo on December 8, 1943

=== Zun Pan Set ===
Period: Early Warring Period
Height of Zun: 33.1cm
Wide of Zun: 62cm
Height of Pan: 24cm
Wide of Pan: 57.6cm
Depth of Pan: 12cm
Weight: 28.2 kg
Location: Hubei Museum, Hubei

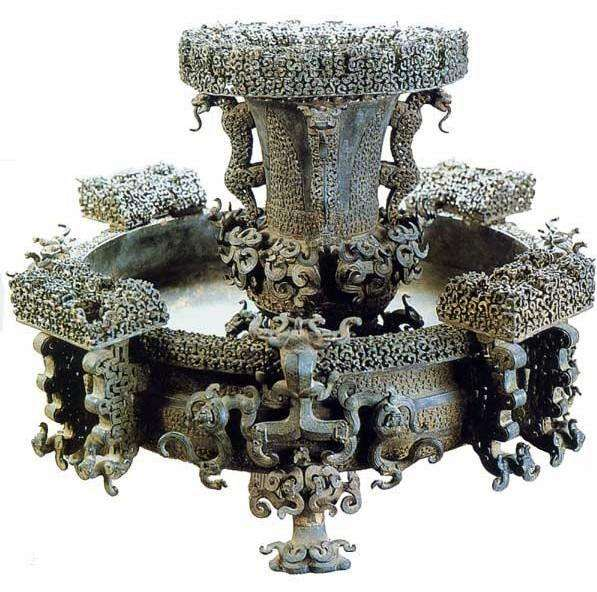
bronze zun-pan set from the tomb of Marquis Yi of Zeng

The bronze zun-pan set from the tomb of Marquis Yi of Zeng (433 BC) unearthed in Suizhou, Hubei in 1978. This is the most exquisite and complex bronze ever found. The set was probably created for an earlier marquis whose name has been erased and replaced by the Marquis of Yi. The Zun Pan set has various decorations on the plate. The bronze Zun is made of 34 parts, which are cast and welded in 56 places. A total of 56 Panlong and 48 Panchi are decorated on the body of the Pan, and a seven-character inscription is engraved on the bottom of the neck of Zun and the bottom of Pan.

=== He zun ===
Period: Western Zhou
Overall Height: 38.8 cm
Weight: 14.6 kg
Location: Baoji Museum, Shaanxi

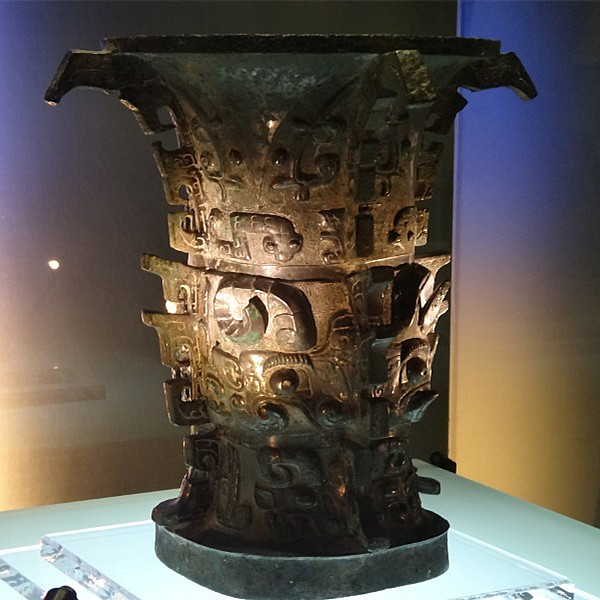

He Zun, renowned for the written characters meaning "Middle Kingdom", that is, "China" (中國) in a bronze inscription on the bottom, is one of the most important and well-known Chinese bronze vessels of the Western Zhou. It was discovered by chance and its value hadn't been recognized for a long time after it was unearthed. Now He Zun is one of the precious cultural relics which can never be exhibited overseas as expressly provided by Chinese government. This vessel describes the establishment of a royal residence at the new capital five years after King Cheng assumed the throne. The inscription, which is unclear in parts, was composed by He, who received a speech and gifts from the King. We do not know who his father was nor what role he played in the Zhou conquest, but it is possible that He and his lineage were originally not members of the Zhou tribe. The inscription is particularly interesting in that it demonstrates that the primacy of the deity Tian was already established. “Tian” is a Zhou term for the highest divine force; Shang oracle texts employed the term “Di” in a similar sense.

It was when the King first removed his residence to Cheng-Zhou that, carrying on anew the rites of King Wu, he performed fu-sacrifices beginning from the altar of Heaven. In the fourth month on the day bing-xu the King addressed the junior members of [our] lineage in the Great Hall of the Jing Palace saying, “Formerly your late father assisted King Wen and aided King Wen in receiving this [great mandate]. When King Wu had newly conquered the Great City of Shang he made an announcement in the courtyard at the altar of Heaven saying, ‘I shall reside in this central country and from it rule the people.’ Pay attention, inexperienced youths! Attend to the example of your forebear, whose sacrificial vessels stand on the altar of Heaven. Carryon his mandate and sacrifice to him with care. May the great virtue of the former Kings bathe the altar of Heaven and guide us in our ignorance.

When the King had completed his address, he bestowed upon He thirty strings of cowries, wherefore has been cast this precious sacrificial vessel for X Gong.

=== Lidded ritual wine container (zun) in the form of a bird ===
Period： Middle Eastern Zhou dynasty
Overall height：26.5 cm
Wide: 13.5 cm
Deep: 20 cm
Location: Freer Gallery of Art F1961.30a-b

This example was reportedly excavated near Taiyuan, Shanxi province, China. To 1915:Marcel Bing (1875–1920), Paris, to 1915. From 1915 to 1961: Eugene (1875–1959) and Agnes E. (1887–1970) Meyer, Washington, D.C., and Mt. Kisco, New York, purchased jointly with Charles L. Freer (1854–1919) from Marcel Bing through C.T. Loo, Lai Yuan & Co., New York, in December 1915. From 1961: Freer Gallery of Art, gift of Eugene and Agnes E. Meyer, 1961.

=== Xi Zun [One] ===
Period: Late Spring and Autumn
Overall Height: 33.7cm
Length: 58.7cm
Weight: 10.76kg
Location: Shanghai Museum, Shanghai

Xi (犧) in ancient Chinese means solid coloured animals used as sacrifice, although it may have originally been written with the different character 獻 (suō). This vessel is shaped like a vivid ox, which is strong and steady. There are three holes on the ox's back. The middle hole can hold a small wine pot so hot water can be poured into the hollow belly from other two holes. On this basis, researcher infer that Xi Zun might be used to warm wine. Xi Zun is extremely unusual because of its distinctive style and design. This example is the most famous one but not the only one.

=== Xi Zun [Two] ===
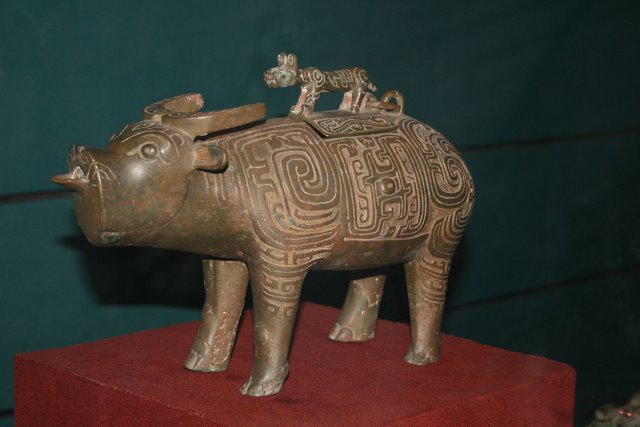
A zun in the shape of an ox, dating from the Western Zhou dynasty

Period: Middle Western Zhou dynasty
Overall Height: 24 cm
Length: 38 cm
Depth of Belly: 10.7 cm
Location: Shaanxi History Museum, Xi'an

This example was excavated in 1967 from Hejiacun, Qishan County, Shaanxi. It is a wine container shaped like an ox as well, but with a square hole on its back and a tiger-shaped lid. The tail of the ox is the handle. The exaggerated mould is very magnificent.

=== Gold and silver inlay cloud-patterned rhinoceros Zun ===
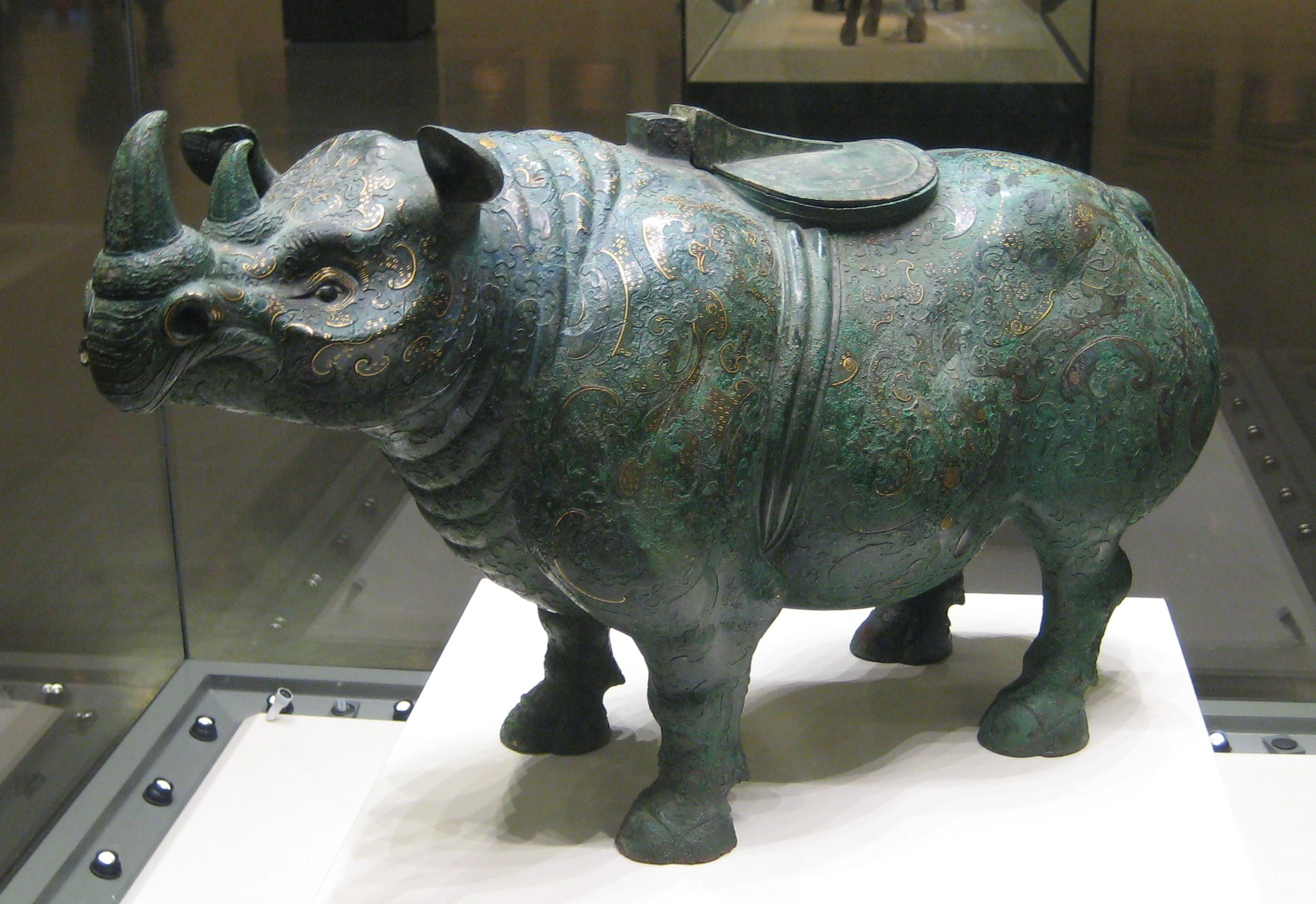
A zun in the shape of a rhinoceros, dating from the Western Han dynasty

Period: Western Han (206 BC – AD 8)
Overall Height: 34.4 cm
Length: 58.1 cm
Location: National Museum of China, Beijing

It was excavated in 1963 from Doumacun, Xingping, Shaanxi Province. This vessel is in the form of a powerful standing rhinoceros with a raised head with pricked ears and sharp tusks. Its eyes are bright black glass beads, giving it a graceful expression. The lid on its back is hinged at the front allowing it to be opened. Cloud decorations cover the entire body with spirals in between, all inlaid with gold and silver, suggesting the fine hairs of the rhinoceros. This is a realistic piece with flowing and lively decoration, and deserves to be considered a masterpiece of Western Han gold and silver inlay.

== See also ==
- Baijiu
- Huangjiu
- Rhyton
- Wine in China
- Yi

== General references ==
- Chang, K.C. (1976). "Changing Relationship of Man and Animal in Shang and Chou Myths and Art". Early Chinese Civilization: Anthropological Perspectives. Cambridge: Harvard University Press. p. 175.
- Ma, Chengyuan (1986). Ancient Chinese Bronzes. Hong Kong: Oxford University Press.
- Erdberg, Eleanor Von (1993). Ancient Chinese Bronzes: Terminology and Iconology.
- Leohr, Max (1968). Ritual Vessels of Bronze Age China. New York: Asia Society.
- Rawson, Jessica (1987). Chinese Bronzes: Art and Ritual. London: British Museum.
- Kesner, Ladislav (1991). "The Taotie Reconsidered: Meanings and Functions of the Shang Theriomorphic Imagery". Artibus Asiae. 51 (1/2): 30. doi:10.2307/3249675. JSTOR 3249675.
