= Names of China =

China
- "China" in simplified (top) and traditional (bottom) character forms

Chinese name
- Traditional Chinese: 中國
- Simplified Chinese: 中国
- Hanyu Pinyin: Zhōngguó
- Literal meaning: Middle or Central State
Transcriptions
Standard Mandarin
- Hanyu Pinyin: Zhōngguó
- Bopomofo: ㄓㄨㄥ ㄍㄨㄛˊ
- Gwoyeu Romatzyh: Jonggwo
- Wade–Giles: Chung¹-kuo²
- Tongyong Pinyin: Jhongguó
- Yale Romanization: Jūnggwó
- MPS2: Jūngguó
- IPA: [ʈʂʊ́ŋ.kwǒ]
other Mandarin
- Xiao'erjing: جْو قُوَ
- Dungan: Җунгуй
- Sichuanese Pinyin: Zong^{1} gwe^{2}
Wu
- Wugniu: tson^{1} koq^{7}
- IPA: Shanghainese: [tsoŋ˥ koʔ˨˩]
Gan
- Romanization: Tung-koe̍t; Chungkoet
Xiang
- IPA: Tan^{33}-kwɛ^{24}
Hakka
- Romanization: Dung^{24}-gued^{2}
- Pha̍k-fa-sṳ: Chûng-koet
Yue: Cantonese
- Yale Romanization: Jùnggwok or Jūnggwok
- Jyutping: zung^{1} gwok^{3}
- IPA: [tsʊŋ˥˧.kʷɔk̚˧] or [tsʊŋ˥.kʷɔk̚˧]
Southern Min
- Hokkien POJ: Tiong-kok
- Tâi-lô: Tiong-kok
Eastern Min
- Fuzhou BUC: Dṳ̆ng-guók
Pu-Xian Min
- Hinghwa BUC: De̤ng-go̤h
Northern Min
- Jian'ou Romanized: Dô̤ng-gŏ

Common name
- Traditional Chinese: 中華
- Simplified Chinese: 中华
- Hanyu Pinyin: Zhōnghuá
Transcriptions
Standard Mandarin
- Hanyu Pinyin: Zhōnghuá
- Bopomofo: ㄓㄨㄥ ㄏㄨㄚˊ
- Gwoyeu Romatzyh: Jonghwa
- Wade–Giles: Chung¹-hua²
- Tongyong Pinyin: Jhonghuá
- Yale Romanization: Jūnghwá
- MPS2: Jūnghuá
- IPA: [ʈʂʊ́ŋ.xwǎ]
other Mandarin
- Xiao'erjing: ﺟْﻮ ﺧُﻮَا
Wu
- Wugniu: tson^{1} gho^{2}
- IPA: Shanghainese: [tsoŋ˥ ɦo˨˩] Suzhounese: [tsoŋ˦ ɦo]
Gan
- Romanization: tung^{1} fa^{4} or Chungfa
Hakka
- Romanization: dung^{24} fa^{11}
- Pha̍k-fa-sṳ: Chûng-fà
Yue: Cantonese
- Yale Romanization: Jùng'wàh or Jūng'wàh
- Jyutping: zung^{1} waa^{4}
- IPA: [tsʊŋ˥˧.wa˩] or [tsʊŋ˥.wa˩]
Southern Min
- Hokkien POJ: Tiong-hôa
- Tâi-lô: Tiong-huâ
Eastern Min
- Fuzhou BUC: Dṳ̆ng-huà

Tibetan name
- Tibetan: ཀྲུང་གོ
Transcriptions
- Wylie: Krung-go
- Tibetan Pinyin: Zhung-go

Zhuang name
- Zhuang: Cungguek
- Sawndip: 中国

Mongolian name
- Mongolian Cyrillic: Дундад улс
- Mongolian script: ᠳᠤᠮᠳᠠᠳᠤ ᠤᠯᠤᠰ
Transcriptions
- SASM/GNC: Dumdadu ulus

Uyghur name
- Uyghur: جۇڭگو
Transcriptions
- Latin Yëziqi: Junggo
- Siril Yëziqi: Җуңго

Manchu name
- Manchu script: ᡩᡠᠯᡳᠮᠪᠠᡳ ᡤᡠᡵᡠᠨ
- Romanization: Dulimbai gurun

Kazakh name
- Kazakh: جۇڭگو (قىتاي); Jūñgö (Qytai); Жұңгө (Қытай)

Kyrgyz name
- Kyrgyz: جۇڭگو (قىتاي); Жуңго (Кытай); Cuñğo (Qytaj)

China has many contemporary and historical designations given in various languages for the East Asian country known as 中国; 中國; Zhōngguó ('Central State' or 'Middle Kingdom') in Standard Chinese, a form based on the Beijing dialect of Mandarin.

The English name "China" was borrowed from Portuguese during the 16th century, and its direct cognates became common in the subsequent centuries in the West. It is believed to be a borrowing from Middle Persian, and some have traced it further back to the Sanskrit word चीन (cīna) for the nation. It is also thought that the ultimate source of the name China is the Chinese word Qín (秦), the name of the Qin dynasty that ultimately unified China after existing as a state within the Zhou dynasty for many centuries prior. However, there are alternative suggestions for the etymology of this word.

Chinese names for China, aside from Zhongguo, include Zhōnghuá (中华; 中華; 'Central Hua'), Huáxià (华夏; 華夏), Shénzhōu (神州; 'divine state') and Jiǔzhōu (九州; 'nine states'). While official notions of Chinese nationality do not make any particular reference to ethnicity, common names for the largest ethnic group in China are Hàn (汉; 漢) and Táng (唐). The People's Republic of China (Zhōnghuá Rénmín Gònghéguó) and the Republic of China (Zhōnghuá Mínguó) are the official names of the two governments presently claiming sovereignty over "China". The term "mainland China" refers to areas under the PRC's jurisdiction, either including or excluding Hong Kong and Macau.

There are also names for China used around the world that are derived from the languages of ethnic groups other than Han Chinese: examples include "Cathay" from the Khitan language, and Tabgach from Tuoba. The realm ruled by the Emperor of China is also referred to as the Chinese Empire.

== Sinitic names ==
=== Zhongguo ===
==== Pre-Qing ====
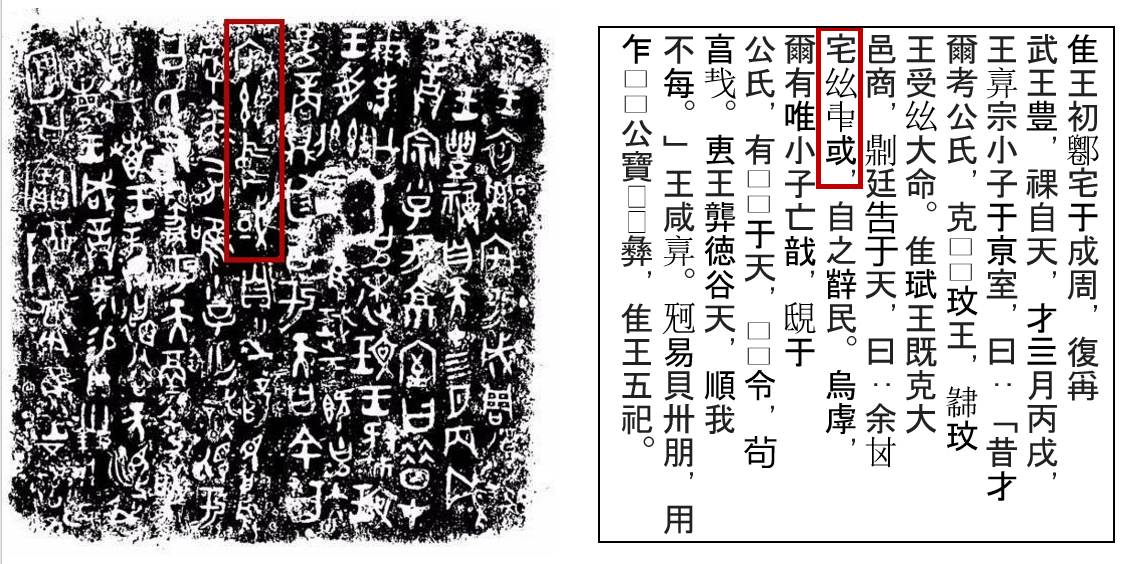
He zun rubbing and transcription; framed is the phrase 宅𢆶𠁩或 (宅茲中國); zhái zī zhōng yù; 'inhabit this central state'.

Zhongguo (中國; 中国; Zhōngguó) is the name for China most commonly used in Chinese in modern times. The name has ancient origin: the earliest appearance of this two-character term is on the He zun, a bronze vessel dating to 1038–c. 1000 BCE, during the early Western Zhou period. The phrase "zhong guo" came into common usage in the Warring States period (475–221 BCE), when it referred to the "Central States", the states of the Yellow River Valley of the Zhou era, as distinguished from the tribal periphery. In later periods, however, Zhongguo was not used in this sense. Dynastic names were used for the state in Imperial China, and concepts of the state aside from the ruling dynasty were little understood. Rather, the country was called by the name of the dynasty, such as "Han", "Tang", "Great Ming", "Great Qing", etc. Until the 19th century, when the globalizing world began to require a common legal language, there was no need for a fixed or unique name.

As early as the Spring and Autumn period, Zhongguo could be understood as either the domain of the capital or used to refer to the Chinese civilization zhūxià (諸夏; 'the various Xia') or zhūhuá (諸華; 'various Hua'), and the political and geographical domain that contained it, but Tianxia was the more common word for this idea. This developed into the usage of the Warring States period, when, other than the cultural community, it could be the geopolitical area of Chinese civilization as well, equivalent to Jiuzhou. In a more limited sense, it could also refer to the Central Plain or the states of Zhao, Wei, and Han, etc., geographically central among the Warring States. Although Zhongguo could be used before the Song dynasty period to mean the trans-dynastic Chinese culture or civilization to which Chinese people belonged, it was in the Song dynasty that writers used Zhongguo as a term to describe the trans-dynastic entity with different dynastic names over time but having a set territory and defined by common ancestry, culture, and language.

The term Zhongguo was used differently in every period. It could refer to the capital of the emperor to distinguish it from the capitals of his vassals, as in Western Zhou. It could refer to the states of the Central Plain to distinguish them from states in the outer regions. The Shi Jing defines Zhongguo as the capital region, setting it in opposition to the capital city. During the Han dynasty, three usages of Zhongguo were common. The Records of the Grand Historian use Zhongguo to denote the capital and also use the concepts zhong ("center, central") and zhongguo to indicate the center of civilization: "There are eight famous mountains in the world: three in Man and Yi (the barbarian wilds), five in Zhōngguó" (天下名山八，而三在蠻夷，五在中國). In this sense, the term Zhongguo is synonymous with Huáxià (华夏; 華夏) and Zhōnghuá (中华; 中華), names of China that were first authentically attested in the Warring States period and Eastern Jin period, respectively.

From the Qin to the Ming dynasty, literati discussed Zhongguo as both a historical place or territory and as a culture. Writers of the Ming period in particular used the term as a political tool to express opposition to expansionist policies that incorporated foreigners into the empire. In contrast, foreign conquerors typically avoided discussions of Zhongguo and instead defined membership in their empires to include both Han and non-Han peoples.

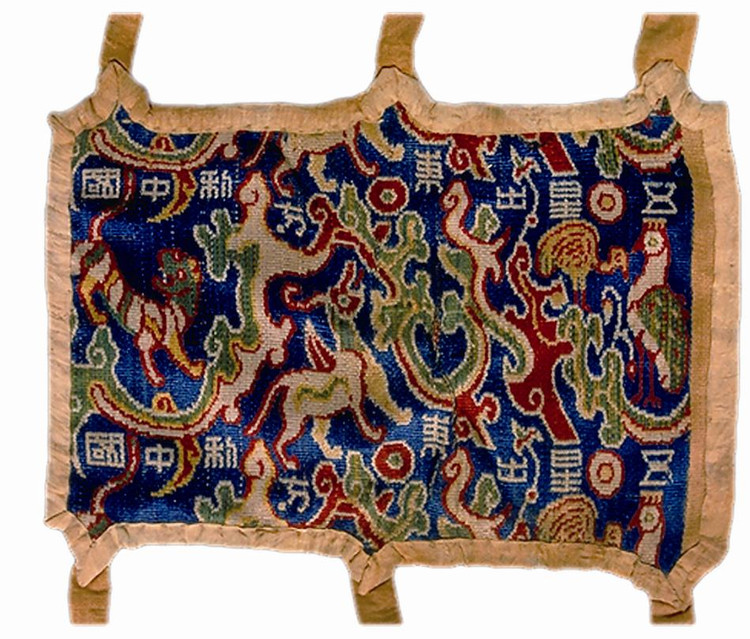
The brocade armband with the words "Five stars rising in the east, being a propitious sign for Zhongguo (中國)", made during the Han dynasty

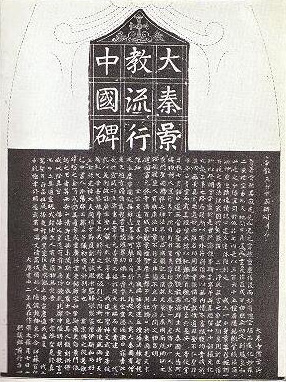
The Nestorian Stele 大秦景教流行中國碑 entitled "Stele to the propagation in China of the luminous religion of Daqin", was erected in 781, during the Tang dynasty

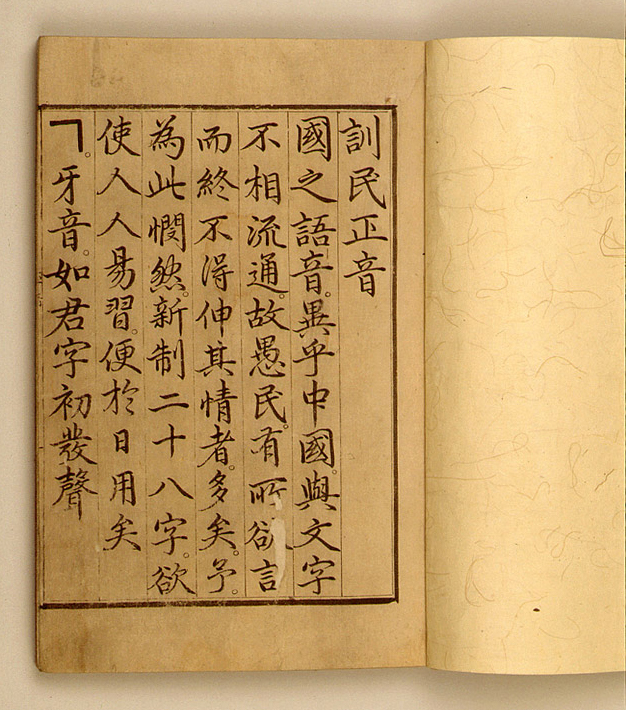
The 1446 Korean document, Hunminjeongeum, compares Joseon's speech to that of Zhongguo (Middle Kingdom), at the time the Ming dynasty. Korean and other neighbouring societies referred to various Chinese regimes and dynasties as "Middle Kingdom"

==== Qing ====
Zhongguo appeared in a formal international legal document for the first time during the Qing dynasty in the Treaty of Nerchinsk, 1689. The term was then used in communications with other states and in treaties. The Manchu rulers incorporated Inner Asian polities into their empire, and Wei Yuan, a statecraft scholar, distinguished the new territories from Zhongguo, which he defined as the 17 provinces of "China proper" plus the Manchu homelands in the Northeast. By the late 19th century, the term had emerged as a common name for the whole country. The empire was sometimes referred to as Great Qing but increasingly as Zhongguo.

Dulimbai Gurun is the Manchu name for China, with "Dulimbai" meaning "central" or "middle" and "Gurun" meaning "nation" or "state". The historian Zhao Gang writes that "not long after the collapse of the Ming, China became the equivalent of Great Qing (Da Qing)—another official title of the Qing state," and "Qing and China became interchangeable official titles, and the latter often appeared as a substitute for the former in official documents." The Qing dynasty referred to their realm as "Dulimbai Gurun" in Manchu. The Qing equated the lands of the Qing realm (including present-day Manchuria, Xinjiang, Mongolia, Tibet, and other areas) with "China" in both the Chinese and Manchu languages, defining China as a multi-ethnic state, rejecting the idea that China only meant Han areas; both Han and non-Han peoples were part of "China". Officials used "China" (though not exclusively) in official documents, international treaties, and foreign affairs, and the "Chinese language" Dulimbai gurun i bithe referred to Chinese, Manchu, and Mongol languages, and the term "Chinese people" (中國人; Zhōngguórén; Dulimbai gurun i niyalma) referred to all Han, Manchus, and Mongol subjects of the Qing. Ming loyalist Han literati held to defining the old Ming borders as China and using "foreigner" to describe minorities under Qing rule such as the Mongols and Tibetans, as part of their anti-Qing ideology.

When the Qing conquered Dzungaria in 1759, they proclaimed that the new land was absorbed into Dulimbai Gurun in a Manchu language memorial. The Qing expounded on their ideology that they were bringing together the "outer" non-Han Chinese, like the Tibetans, Inner, Eastern, and Oirat Mongols, together with the "inner" Han Chinese, into "one family", united in the Qing state, showing that the diverse subjects of the Qing were all part of one family. The Qing used the phrase "Zhōngwài yījiā" (中外一家; 'China and other [countries] as one family') or "Nèiwài yījiā" (內外一家; 'Interior and exterior as one family'), to convey this idea of "unification" of the different peoples. A Manchu-language version of a treaty with the Russian Empire concerning criminal jurisdiction over bandits called people from the Qing "people of the Central Kingdom (Dulimbai Gurun)". In the Manchu official Tulisen's Manchu language account of his meeting with the Torghut Mongol leader Ayuki Khan, it was mentioned that while the Torghuts were unlike the Russians, the "people of the Central Kingdom" (dulimba-i gurun/中國; Zhōngguó) were like the Torghut Mongols, and the "people of the Central Kingdom" referred to the Manchus.

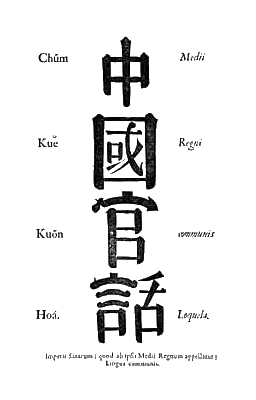
"Middle Kingdom's Common Speech" (Medii Regni Communis Loquela, 中國官話; Zhongguo Guanhua), the frontispiece of an early Chinese grammar published by Étienne Fourmont in 1742

The geography textbooks published in the late Qing period gave detailed descriptions of China's regional position and territorial space. They generally emphasized that China was a large country in Asia but not the center of the world. For example, the "Elementary Chinese Geography Textbook" (蒙學中國地理教科書) published in 1905 described the boundaries of China's territory and neighboring countries as follows: "The western border of China is located in the center of Asia, bordering the (overseas) territories of Britain and Russia. The terrain is humped, like a hat. So all mountains and rivers originate from here. To the east, it faces Japan across the East China Sea. To the south, it is adjacent to the South China Sea, and borders French Annam and British Burma. To the southwest, it is separated from British India by mountains. From the west to the north and the northeast, the three sides of China are all Russian territories. Only the southern border of the northeast is connected to Korea across the Yalu River." It further stated that "There are about a dozen countries in Asia, but only China has a vast territory, a prosperous population, and dominates East Asia. It is a great and world-famous country."

The Qing enacted the first Chinese nationality law in 1909, which defined a Chinese national (Chinese: 中國國籍; pinyin: Zhōngguó Guójí) as any person born to a Chinese father. Children born to a Chinese mother inherited her nationality only if the father was stateless or had unknown nationality status. These regulations were enacted in response to a 1907 statute passed in The Netherlands that retroactively treated all Chinese born in the Dutch East Indies as Dutch citizens. Jus sanguinis was chosen to define Chinese nationality so that the Qing could counter foreign claims on overseas Chinese populations and maintain the perpetual allegiance of its subjects living abroad through paternal lineage. A Chinese word called xuètǒng (血統), which means "bloodline" as a literal translation, is used to explain the descent relationship that would characterize someone as being of Chinese descent and therefore eligible under the Qing laws and beyond, for Chinese citizenship.

Mark Elliott noted that it was under the Qing that "China" transformed into a definition of referring to lands where the "state claimed sovereignty" rather than only the Central Plains area and its people by the end of the 18th century.

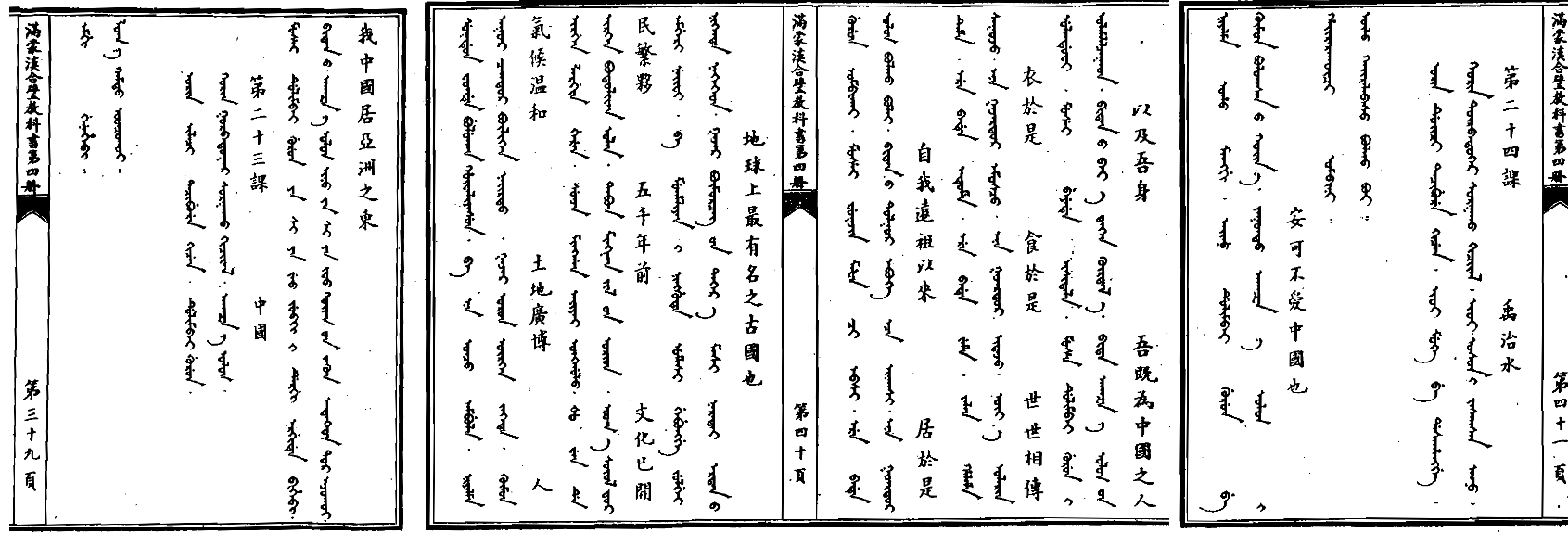
Chapter China (中國) of "The Manchurian, Mongolian and Han Chinese Trilingual Textbook" (滿蒙漢三語合璧教科書) published during the Qing dynasty: "Our country China is located in East Asia... For 5000 years, culture flourished (in the land of China)... Since we are Chinese, how can we not love China."

Elena Barabantseva also noted that the Manchu referred to all subjects of the Qing empire regardless of ethnicity as "Chinese" (中國之人; Zhōngguó zhī rén; 'people of China'), and used the term (中國; Zhōngguó) as a synonym for the entire Qing empire while using Hànrén (漢人) to refer only to the core area of the empire, with the entire empire viewed as multiethnic.

William T. Rowe wrote that the name "China" (中華; 中國) was apparently understood to refer to the political realm of the Han Chinese during the Ming dynasty, that this understanding persisted among the Han Chinese into the early Qing dynasty, and that the understanding was also shared by Aisin Gioro rulers before the Ming–Qing transition. The Qing, however, "came to refer to their more expansive empire not only as the Great Qing but also, nearly interchangeably, as China" within a few decades of this development. Instead of the earlier (Ming) idea of an ethnic Han Chinese state, this new Qing China was a "self-consciously multi-ethnic state". Han Chinese scholars had some time to adapt this, but by the 19th century, the notion of China as a multinational state with new, significantly extended borders had become the standard terminology for Han Chinese writers. Rowe noted that "these were the origins of the China we know today.". He added that while the early Qing rulers viewed themselves as multi-hatted emperors who ruled several nationalities "separately but simultaneously", by the mid-19th century, the Qing Empire had become part of a European-style community of sovereign states and entered into a series of treaties with the West, and such treaties and documents consistently referred to Qing rulers as the "Emperor of China" and his administration as the "Government of China".

Joseph W. Esherick noted that while the Qing Emperors governed frontier non-Han areas in a different, separate system under the Lifanyuan and kept them separate from Han areas and administration, it was the Manchu Qing Emperors who expanded the definition of Zhongguo and made it "flexible" by using that term to refer to the entire Empire and using that term to other countries in diplomatic correspondence, while some Han Chinese subjects criticized their usage of the term and the Han literati Wei Yuan used Zhongguo only to refer to the seventeen provinces of China and three manchurian provinces of the east, excluding other frontier areas. Due to the Qing usage of treaties clarifying the international borders of the Qing state, they were able to inculcate in the Chinese people a sense that China included areas such as Mongolia and Tibet by education reforms in geography, which made it clear where the borders of the Qing state were, even if the populace didn't understand how the Chinese identity included Tibetans and Mongolians or what the connotations of being Chinese were. The English version of the 1842 Treaty of Nanking refers to "His Majesty the Emperor of China" while the Chinese refers both to "The Great Qing Emperor" (Da Qing Huangdi) and to Zhongguo as well. The 1858 Treaty of Tientsin contains similar language.

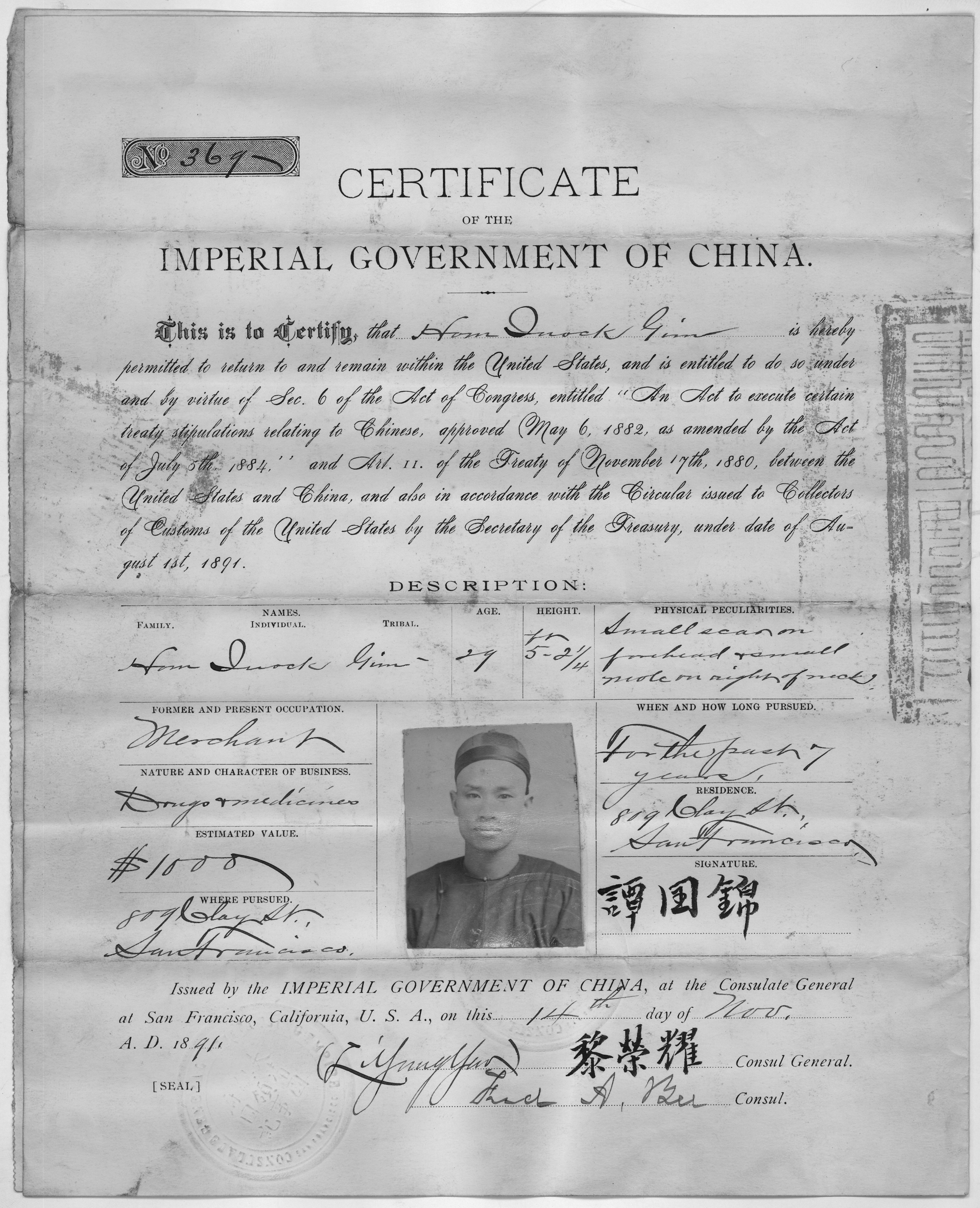
Certificate of the Imperial Government of China issued by the Consulate General of Qing China at San Francisco in 1891

In the late 19th century, the reformer Liang Qichao argued in a famous passage that "our greatest shame is that our country has no name. The names that people ordinarily think of, such as Xia, Han, or Tang, are all the titles of bygone dynasties." He argued that the other countries of the world "all boast of their own state names, such as England and France, the only exception being the Central States", and that the concept of tianxia had to be abandoned in favor of guojia, that is, "nation", for which he accepted the term Zhongguo. On the other hand, American Protestant missionary John Livingstone Nevius, who had been in China for 40 years, wrote in his 1868 book that the most common name which the Chinese used in speaking of their country was Zhongguo, followed by Zhonghuaguo (中華國) and other names such as Tianchao (天朝) and the particular title of the reigning dynasty. Also, the Chinese geography textbook published in 1907 stated that "Chinese citizens call their country Zhongguo or Zhonghua", and noted that China (Zhongguo) was one of the few independent monarchical countries in the whole Asia at that time, along with countries like Japan. The Japanese term "Shina" was once proposed by some as a basically neutral Western-influenced equivalent for "China". But after the founding of the Republic of China in 1912, Zhongguo was also adopted as the abbreviation of Zhonghua minguo, and most Chinese considered Shina foreign and demanded that even the Japanese replace it with Zhonghua minguo, or simply Zhongguo.

Before the signing of the Sino-Japanese Friendship and Trade Treaty in 1871, the first treaty between Qing China and the Empire of Japan, Japanese representatives once raised objections to China's use of the term Zhongguo in the treaty, partly in response to China's earlier objections for the term Tennō or Emperor of Japan to be used in the treaty, declaring that the term Zhongguo was "meant to compare with the frontier areas of the country" and insisted that only "Great Qing" be used for the Qing in the Chinese version of the treaty. However, this was firmly rejected by the Qing representatives: "Our country China has been called Zhongguo for a long time since ancient times. We have signed treaties with various countries, and while Great Qing did appear in the first lines of such treaties, in the body of the treaties Zhongguo was always being used. There has never been a precedent for changing the country name" (我中華之稱中國，自上古迄今，由來已久。即與各國立約，首書寫大清國字樣，其條款內皆稱中國，從無寫改國號之例). The Chinese representatives believed that Zhongguo as a country name equivalent to "Great Qing" could naturally be used internationally, which could not be changed. In the end, both sides agreed that while in the first lines "Great Qing" would be used, whether the Chinese text in the body of the treaty would use the term Zhongguo in the same manner as "Great Qing" would be up to China's discretion.

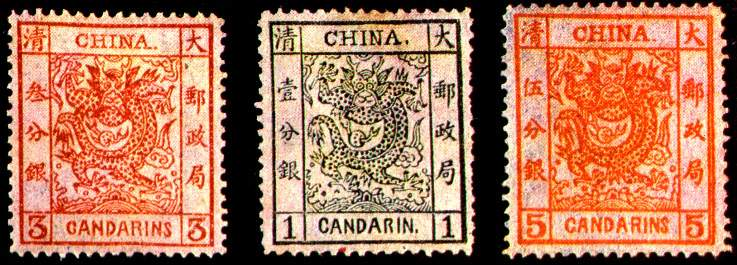
Qing postal stamps released in 1878

Qing official Zhang Deyi once objected to the western European name "China" and said that China referred to itself as Zhonghua. However, the Qing established legations and consulates known as the "Chinese Legation", "Imperial Consulate of China", "Imperial Chinese Consulate (General)" or similar names in various countries with diplomatic relations, such as the United Kingdom and United States. Both English and Chinese terms, such as "China" and "Zhongguo", were frequently used by Qing legations and consulates there to refer to the Qing state during their diplomatic correspondences with foreign states. Chinese diplomat Zeng Jize's 1887 profile, "China: the Sleep, and the Awakening", originally published in the Asiatic Quarterly Review, was widely noticed in the West. Since the late 19th century, the Qing joined various international conventions in the name of "China", including (but not limited to) the First Geneva Convention, Hague Conventions of 1899 and 1907, and the Hague Convention on Hospital Ships. Moreover, the English name "China" was also used domestically by the Qing, such as in its officially released stamps since Qing set up a modern postal system in 1878. The postage stamps (known as 大龍郵票 in Chinese) had a design of a large dragon in the centre, surrounded by a boxed frame with a bilingual inscription of "CHINA" (corresponding to the Great Qing Empire in Chinese) and the local denomination "CANDARINS".

During the late Qing dynasty, various textbooks with the name "Chinese history" (中國歷史) had emerged by the early 20th century. For example, the late Qing textbook "Chinese History of the Present Dynasty" published in 1910 stated that "the history of our present dynasty is part of the history of China, that is, the most recent history in its whole history. China was founded as a country 5,000 years ago and has the longest history in the world. And its culture is the best among all the Eastern countries since ancient times. Its territory covers about 90% of East Asia, and its rise and fall can affect the general trend of the countries in Asia...". After the May Fourth Movement in 1919, educated students began to spread the concept of Zhonghua, which represented the people, including 55 minority ethnic groups and the Han Chinese, with a single culture identifying themselves as "Chinese". The Republic of China and the People's Republic of China both used Zhonghua in their official names. Thus, Zhongguo became the common name for both governments and Zhōngguó rén (中国人; 中國人) for their citizens. Overseas Chinese are referred to as huáqiáo (华侨; 華僑; 'Chinese overseas'), or huáyì (华裔; 華裔; 'Chinese descendants'), i.e. Chinese children born overseas.

==== Middle Kingdom ====
The English translation of Zhongyuan as the "Middle Kingdom" entered European languages through the Portuguese in the 16th century and became popular in the mid-19th century. By the 20th century, the term was thoroughly entrenched in the English language, reflecting the Western view of China as the inward-looking Middle Kingdom, or more accurately, the "Central Kingdom" or "Central State". Endymion Wilkinson points out that the Chinese were not unique in thinking of their country as central, although China was the only culture to use the concept for its name. However, the term Zhongguo was not initially used as a name for China. It did not have the same meaning throughout the course of history, (see above).

During the 19th century, China was alternatively, although less commonly, referred to in the west as the "Middle Flowery Kingdom", "Central Flowery Kingdom", or "Central Flowery State", translated from Zhōnghuáguó (中华国; 中華國), or simply the "Flowery Kingdom", translated from Huáguó (华国; 華國). However, some have since argued that such a translation (fairly commonly seen at that time) was perhaps caused by misunderstanding the Huá (华; 華) that means "China" (or "magnificent, splendid") for the Huā (花) that means "flower".

=== Huaxia ===
The name Huáxià (华夏; 華夏) is generally used as a sobriquet in Chinese text. Under traditional interpretations, it is the combination of two words that originally referred to the elegance of traditional Han attire and the Confucian concept of rites.

- Hua, which means "flowery beauty" (i.e., having beauty of dress and personal adornment 有服章之美，謂之華).
- Xia, which means greatness or grandeur (i.e., having greatness in social customs, courtesy, polite manners and rites/ceremony 有禮儀之大，故稱夏).

In the original sense, Huaxia refers to a confederation of tribes—living along the Yellow River—who were the ancestors of what later became the Han ethnic group in China. During the Warring States (475–221 BCE), the self-awareness of the Huaxia identity developed and took hold in ancient China.

=== Zhonghua minzu ===
Zhonghua minzu is a term meaning "Chinese nation" in the sense of a multi-ethnic national identity. Though originally rejected by the PRC, it has been used officially since the 1980s for nationalist politics.

=== Tianchao and Tianxia ===
Tianchao (天朝; pinyin: Tiāncháo), translated as 'heavenly dynasty' or 'Celestial Empire', and Tianxia (天下; pinyin: Tiānxià) translated as 'All under heaven', have both been used to refer to China. These terms were usually used in the context of civil wars or periods of division, with the term Tianchao evoking the idea that the realm's ruling dynasty was appointed by heaven, or that whoever ends up reunifying China is said to have ruled Tianxia, or everything under heaven. This fits with the traditional Chinese theory of rulership, in which the emperor was nominally the political leader of the entire world and not merely the leader of a nation-state within the world. Historically, the term was connected to the later Zhou dynasty (c. 1046–256 BCE), especially the Spring and Autumn period (eighth to fourth century BCE) and the Warring States period (from there to 221 BCE, when China was reunified by Qin). The phrase Tianchao continues to see use on Chinese internet discussion boards, in reference to China.

The phrase Tianchao was first translated into English and French in the early 19th century, appearing in foreign publications and diplomatic correspondences, with the translated phrase "Celestial Empire" occasionally used to refer to China. During this period, the term celestial was used by some to refer to the subjects of the Qing in a non-prejudicial manner, derived from the term "Celestial Empire". However, the term celestial was also used in a pejorative manner during the 19th century, in reference to Chinese immigrants in Australasia and North America. The translated phrase largely fell into disuse in the 20th century.

=== Jiangshan and Shanhe ===
The two names Jiāngshān (江山) and Shānhé (山河), both literally 'rivers and mountains', quite similar in usage to Tianxia, simply referring to the entire world, the most prominent features of which being rivers and mountains. The use of this term is also common as part of the idiom Jiāngshān shèjì (江山社稷; 'rivers and mountains', 'soil and grain'), in a suggestion of the need to implement good governance.

=== Jiuzhou ===
The name jiǔ zhōu (九州) means 'nine provinces'. Widely used in pre-modern Chinese text, the word originated during the middle of the Warring States period. During that time, the Yellow River region was divided into nine geographical regions. Some people also attribute this word to the mythical hero and king Yu the Great, who, in the legend, divided China into nine provinces during his reign.

=== Han ===
Han

Chinese name
- Traditional Chinese: 漢
- Simplified Chinese: 汉
- Hanyu Pinyin: Hàn
Transcriptions
Standard Mandarin
- Hanyu Pinyin: Hàn
- Bopomofo: ㄏㄢˋ
- Gwoyeu Romatzyh: Hann
- Wade–Giles: Han⁴
- IPA: [xân]
Wu
- Wugniu: hoe^{5}
- IPA: Shanghainese: [hø˧˧˦] Suzhounese: [hø˥˨˧] Changzhounese: [hɤ˧˨˦] Hangzhounese: [hẽ˦˦˥] Shaoxingese: [hẽ˧] Ningbonese: [he˦]
Gan
- Romanization: Hon^{5}
Hakka
- Romanization: Hon^{55}
Yue: Cantonese
- Yale Romanization: Hon
- Jyutping: hon^{3}
- IPA: [hɔn˧]
Southern Min
- Hokkien POJ: Hàn
- Tâi-lô: Hàn
- Teochew Peng'im: Hang^{3}
Eastern Min
- Fuzhou BUC: Háng
Middle Chinese
- Middle Chinese: xan^{C}

Vietnamese name
- Vietnamese alphabet: Hán
- Chữ Hán: 漢

Korean name
- Hangul: 한
- Hanja: 漢
Transcriptions
- Revised Romanization: han

Japanese name
- Kanji: 漢
- Kana: かん
Transcriptions
- Romanization: kan

The name Han (汉; 漢; Hàn) derives from the Han dynasty (206 BC–AD 220), which presided over China's first "golden age".. The Han dynasty collapsed in 220 and was followed by a long period of disorder, including the Three Kingdoms, Sixteen Kingdoms, and Southern and Northern dynasties. During these periods, various non-Han ethnic groups established various dynasties in northern China. People began to use the term Han to refer to the natives of North China, who, unlike the minorities, were the descendants of the subjects of the Han dynasty.

During the Yuan dynasty, subjects of the empire were divided into four classes: Mongols, Semu, Han, and "Southerners". Northern Chinese were called Han, which was considered to be the highest class of Chinese. This class, Han, includes all ethnic groups in northern China, including Khitan and Jurchen who have, for the most part, sinicized during the last two hundreds years. The name Han became popularly accepted during this time.

During the Qing, the Manchu rulers also used the name Han to distinguish the natives of the Central Plains from the Manchus. After the fall of the Qing government, the Han became the name of a nationality within China. Today, the term "Han persons", often rendered in English as "Han Chinese", is used by the People's Republic of China to refer to the most populous of the 56 officially recognized ethnic groups in China.

=== Tang ===
Tang

Chinese name
- Chinese: 唐
- Hanyu Pinyin: Táng
Transcriptions
Standard Mandarin
- Hanyu Pinyin: Táng
- Bopomofo: ㄊㄤˊ
- Gwoyeu Romatzyh: Tarng
- Wade–Giles: Tʻang²
- IPA: [tʰǎŋ]
Wu
- Romanization: Daon^{平}
Gan
- Romanization: Tong
Hakka
- Romanization: Tong^{11}
Yue: Cantonese
- Yale Romanization: Tòhng
- Jyutping: Tong4
- IPA: [tʰɔŋ˩]
Southern Min
- Hokkien POJ: Tông/Tn̂g
- Tâi-lô: Tông/Tn̂g

Vietnamese name
- Vietnamese alphabet: Đường
- Chữ Hán: 唐

Korean name
- Hangul: 당
- Hanja: 唐
Transcriptions
- Revised Romanization: dang

Japanese name
- Kanji: 唐
- Kana: とう (On), から (Kun)
Transcriptions
- Romanization: tō (On), kara (Kun)

The name Tang (唐; Táng) comes from the Tang dynasty (618–907) that presided over China's second golden age. It was during the Tang dynasty that South China was finally and fully sinicized. Tang would become synonymous with China in Southern China, and it is usually Southern Chinese who refer to themselves as "People of Tang" (唐人, pinyin: Tángrén). For example, the sinicization and rapid development of Guangdong during the Tang period would lead the Cantonese to refer to themselves as Tong-yan (唐人) in Cantonese, while China is called Tong-saan (唐山; pinyin: Tángshān; lit. 'Tang Mountain'). Chinatowns worldwide, often dominated by Southern Chinese, also became referred to as Tang People's Street (唐人街, Cantonese: Tong-yan-gaai; pinyin: Tángrénjiē). The Cantonese term Tongsan (Tang mountain) is recorded in Old Malay as one of the local terms for China, along with the Sanskrit-derived Cina. It is still used in Malaysia and Indonesia today, at times in a derogatory sense.

Among Taiwanese, Tang mountain (Min-Nan: Tng-soa) has been used, for example, in the saying, "has Tangshan father, no Tangshan mother" (有唐山公，無唐山媽; Pe̍h-ōe-jī: Ū Tn̂g-soaⁿ kong, bô Tn̂g-soaⁿ má). This refers to how the Han people crossing the Taiwan Strait in the 17th and 18th centuries were mostly men, and that many of their offspring would be through intermarriage with Taiwanese aborigine women.

In Ryukyuan, karate was originally called tii (手, hand) or karatii (唐手, Tang hand) because 唐ぬ國 too-nu-kuku or kara-nu-kuku (唐ぬ國) was a common Ryukyuan name for China; it was changed to karate (空手, open hand) to appeal to Japanese people after the First Sino-Japanese War.

Zhu Yu, who wrote during the Northern Song dynasty, noted that the name "Han" was first used by the northwestern 'barbarians' to refer to China, while the name "Tang" was first used by the southeastern 'barbarians' to refer to China, and these terms subsequently influenced the local Chinese terminology. During the Mongol invasions of Japan, the Japanese distinguished between the "Han" of northern China, who, like the Mongols and Koreans, were not to be taken prisoner, and the Newly Submitted Army of southern China, whom they called "Tang", who would be enslaved instead.

=== Dalu and Neidi ===
Dàlù (大陸/大陆; pinyin: dàlù), literally "big continent" or "mainland" in this context, is used as a short form of Zhōnggúo Dàlù (中國大陸/中国大陆, mainland China), excluding (depending on the context) Hong Kong, Macau, or Taiwan. This term is used in official contexts on both the mainland and Taiwan when referring to the mainland as opposed to Taiwan. In certain contexts, it is equivalent to the term Neidi (内地; pinyin: nèidì, literally "the inner land"). While Neidi generally refers to the interior as opposed to a particular coastal or border location, or the coastal or border regions generally, it is used in Hong Kong specifically to mean mainland China, excluding Hong Kong, Macau, and Taiwan. Increasingly, it is also being used in an official context within mainland China, for example, in reference to the separate judicial and customs jurisdictions of mainland China on the one hand and Hong Kong, Macau and Taiwan on the other.

The term Neidi is also often used in Xinjiang and Tibet to distinguish the eastern provinces of China from the minority-populated, autonomous regions of the west.

== Official names ==
=== People's Republic of China ===
People's Republic of China
- "People's Republic of China" in simplified (top) and traditional (bottom) Chinese characters

Chinese name
- Simplified Chinese: 中华人民共和国
- Traditional Chinese: 中華人民共和國
- Hanyu Pinyin: Zhōnghuá Rénmín Gònghéguó
Transcriptions
Standard Mandarin
- Hanyu Pinyin: Zhōnghuá Rénmín Gònghéguó
- Bopomofo: ㄓㄨㄥ ㄏㄨㄚˊ ㄖㄣˊ ㄇㄧㄣˊ ㄍㄨㄥˋ ㄏㄜˊ ㄍㄨㄛˊ
- Gwoyeu Romatzyh: Jonghwa Renmin Gonqhergwo
- Wade–Giles: Chung¹-hua² Jên²-min²; Kung⁴-ho²-kuo²
- Tongyong Pinyin: Jhonghuá Rénmín Gònghéguó
- Yale Romanization: Jūnghwá Rénmín Gùnghégwó
- MPS2: Jūnghuá Rénmín Gùnghéguó
- IPA: [ʈʂʊ́ŋ.xwǎ ɻə̌n.mǐn kʊ̂ŋ.xɤ̌.kwǒ]
other Mandarin
- Xiao'erjing: ﺟْﻮﺧُﻮَ ژٌمٍ ﻗْﻮحْقُوَع
- Dungan: Җунхуа Жынмин Гунхәгуй
- Sichuanese Pinyin: Zong^{1} hua^{2} Zen^{2} min^{2} Gong^{4} hwe^{2} gwe^{2}
Wu
- Romanization: tson^{平} gho^{平} zin^{平} min^{平} gon^{去} ghu^{平} koh^{入}
Gan
- Romanization: Chungfa Ninmin Khungfokoet
Xiang
- IPA: /tan^{33} go^{13} ŋin^{13} min^{13} gan^{45} gu^{13} kwɛ^{24}/
Hakka
- Romanization: dung^{24} fa^{11} ngin^{11} min^{11} kiung^{55} fo^{11} gued^{2}
- Pha̍k-fa-sṳ: Chûng-fà Ngìn-mìn; Khiung-fò-koet
Yue: Cantonese
- Yale Romanization: Jùng'wàh Yàhnmàhn Guhng'wòhgwok or Jūng'wàh Yàhnmàhn Guhng'wòhgwok
- Jyutping: Zung1waa4 Jan4man4 Gung6wo4gwok3
- IPA: [tsʊŋ˥˧.wa˩ jɐn˩.mɐn˩ kʊŋ˨.wɔ˩.kʷɔk̚˧] or [tsʊŋ˥.wa˩ jɐn˩.mɐn˩ kʊŋ˨.wɔ˩.kʷɔk̚˧]
Southern Min
- Hokkien POJ: Tiong-hôa Jîn-bîn Kiōng-hô-kok
- Tâi-lô: Tiong-huâ Jîn-bîn Kiōng-hô-kok
Eastern Min
- Fuzhou BUC: Dṳ̆ng-huà Ìng-mìng; Gê̤ṳng-huò-guók
Pu-Xian Min
- Hinghwa BUC: De̤ng-huá Cíng-míng; Gē̤ng-hó̤-go̤h
Northern Min
- Jian'ou Romanized: Dô̤ng-uǎ Nêng-měng; Gō̤ng-uǎ-gŏ

Tibetan name
- Tibetan: ཀྲུང་ཧྭ་མི་དམངས་སྤྱི མཐུན་རྒྱལ་ཁབ
Transcriptions
- Wylie: krung hwa mi dmangs spyi mthun rgyal khab
- Tibetan Pinyin: Zhunghua Mimang Jitun Gyalkab

Vietnamese name
- Vietnamese alphabet: Cộng hoà Nhân dân Trung Hoa
- Chữ Hán: 共和人民中華 / 中華人民共和國

Thai name
- Thai: สาธารณรัฐประชาชนจีน

Zhuang name
- Zhuang: Cunghvaz Yinzminz Gunghozgoz

Korean name
- Hangul: 중화 인민 공화국
- Hanja: 中華人民共和國
Transcriptions
- Revised Romanization: junghwa inmin gonghwagug

Mongolian name
- Mongolian Cyrillic: Бүгд Найрамдах Дундад Ард Улс
- Mongolian script: ᠪᠦᠭᠦᠳᠡ ᠨᠠᠶᠢᠷᠠᠮᠳᠠᠬᠤ ᠳᠤᠮᠳᠠᠳᠤ ᠠᠷᠠᠳ ᠤᠯᠤᠰ
Transcriptions
- SASM/GNC: Bügüde Nayiramdaqu Dumdadu Arad Ulus

Japanese name
- Kanji: 中華人民共和国
Transcriptions
- Romanization: Chūkajinminkyōwakoku

Uyghur name
- Uyghur: جۇڭخۇا خەلق جۇمھۇرىيىتى
Transcriptions
- Latin Yëziqi: Jungxua Xelq Jumhuriyiti
- Yengi Yeziⱪ: Junghua Həlⱪ Jumⱨuriyiti
- SASM/GNC: Junghua Hälk̂ Jumĥuriyiti
- Siril Yëziqi: Җуңхуа Хәлқ Җумһурийити

Manchu name
- Manchu script: ᡩᡠᠯᡳᠮᠪᠠᡳ ᠨᡳᠶᠠᠯᠮᠠᡳᡵᡤᡝᠨ ᡤᡠᠨᡥᡝ ᡤᡠᡵᡠᠨ
- Romanization: Dulimbai niyalmairgen gunghe' gurun

In 1949, China adopted its official name, Zhōnghuá Rénmín Gònghéguó (in the older postal romanization, Chunghwa Jenmin Konghokuo), or the "People's Republic of China" in English, which was adapted from the Chinese Communist Party's short-lived Chinese Soviet Republic in 1931. While originally, it was proposed at the Preparatory Committee of the New Political Consultative Conference to called the newly established state as the "People's Democratic Republic of China" (中华人民民主共和国), this was later shortened to just the "People's Republic of China". The possessive adjective harkens to the socialist doctrine of a people's democracy and was also meant to provide a cleft with the preceding republican regime.

The name New China has been frequently applied to China by the Chinese Communist Party as a positive political and social term contrasting pre-1949 China (the establishment of the PRC) and the PRC. This term is also sometimes used by writers outside of mainland China.

The PRC was known to many in the West during the Cold War as "Communist China" or "Red China" to distinguish it from the Republic of China which is commonly called "Taiwan", "Nationalist China", or "Free China". In some contexts, particularly in economics, trade, and sports, "China" is often used to refer to mainland China to the exclusion of Hong Kong, Macau and Taiwan.

=== Republic of China ===
Republic of China
- "Republic of China" in Traditional (top) and Simplified (bottom) Chinese characters

Chinese name
- Traditional Chinese: 中華民國
- Simplified Chinese: 中华民国
- Postal: Chunghwa Minkuo
- Literal meaning: Central State People's Country
Transcriptions
Standard Mandarin
- Hanyu Pinyin: Zhōnghuá Mínguó
- Bopomofo: ㄓㄨㄥ ㄏㄨㄚˊ ㄇㄧㄣˊ ㄍㄨㄛˊ
- Gwoyeu Romatzyh: Jonghwa Min'gwo
- Wade–Giles: Chung¹-hua² Min²-kuo²
- Tongyong Pinyin: Jhonghuá Mínguó
- Yale Romanization: Jūnghwá Mín'gwó
- MPS2: Jūnghuá Mínguó
- IPA: [ʈʂʊ́ŋ.xwǎ mǐn.kwǒ]
other Mandarin
- Xiao'erjing: ﺟْﻮ ﺧُﻮَ مٍ ﻗُﻮَع
Wu
- Romanization: tson^{平} gho^{平} min^{平} koh^{入}
Gan
- Romanization: tung^{1} fa^{4} min^{4} koet^{7} or Chungfa Minkoet
Hakka
- Romanization: dung^{24} fa^{11} min^{11} gued^{2}
- Pha̍k-fa-sṳ: Chûng-fà Mìn-koet
Yue: Cantonese
- Yale Romanization: Jùng'wàh Màhn'gwok or Jūng'wàh Màhn'gwok
- Jyutping: Zung1waa4 Man4gwok3
- IPA: [tsʊŋ˥˧.wa˩ mɐn˩.kʷɔk̚˧] or [tsʊŋ˥.wa˩ mɐn˩.kʷɔk̚˧]
Southern Min
- Hokkien POJ: Tiong-hôa Bîn-kok
- Tâi-lô: Tiong-huâ Bîn-kok
Eastern Min
- Fuzhou BUC: Dṳ̆ng-huà Mìng-guók

Chinese Taipei
- Traditional Chinese: 中華臺北 or 中華台北
- Simplified Chinese: 中华台北
Transcriptions
Standard Mandarin
- Hanyu Pinyin: Zhōnghuá Táiběi
- Bopomofo: ㄓㄨㄥ ㄏㄨㄚˊ ㄊㄞˊ ㄅㄟˇ
- Gwoyeu Romatzyh: Jonghwa Tairbeei
- Wade–Giles: Chung¹-hua² Tʻai²-pei³
- Tongyong Pinyin: Jhonghuá Táiběi
- Yale Romanization: Jūnghwá Táiběi
- MPS2: Jūnghuá Táiběi
- IPA: [ʈʂʊ́ŋ.xwǎ tʰǎɪ.pèɪ]
Hakka
- Pha̍k-fa-sṳ: Chûng-fà Thòi-pet
Yue: Cantonese
- Yale Romanization: Jùng'wàh Tòihbāk or Jūng'wàh Tòihbāk
- Jyutping: Zung1waa4 Toi4bak1
- IPA: [tsʊŋ˥˧.wa˩ tʰɔj˩.pɐk̚˥] or [tsʊŋ˥.wa˩ tʰɔj˩.pɐk̚˥]
Southern Min
- Hokkien POJ: Tiong-hôa Tâi-pak
- Tâi-lô: Tiong-huâ Tâi-pak
Eastern Min
- Fuzhou BUC: Dṳ̆ng-huà Dài-báe̤k

Separate Customs Territory of Taiwan, Penghu, Kinmen, and Matsu
- Traditional Chinese: 臺澎金馬 個別關稅領域 or 台澎金馬 個別關稅領域
- Simplified Chinese: 台澎金马 个别关税领域
Transcriptions
Standard Mandarin
- Hanyu Pinyin: Tái-Péng-Jīn-Mǎ; Gèbié Guānshuì Lǐngyù
- Bopomofo: ㄊㄞˊ ㄆㄥˊ ㄐㄧㄣ ㄇㄚˇ ㄍㄜˋ ㄅㄧㄝˊ ㄍㄨㄢ ㄕㄨㄟˋ ㄌㄧㄥˇ ㄩˋ
- Gwoyeu Romatzyh: Tair Perng Jin Maa; Gehbye Guanshuey Liingyuh
- Wade–Giles: Tʻai² Pʻêng² Chin¹ Ma³; Ko⁴-pieh² Kuan¹-shui⁴ Ling³-yü⁴
- Tongyong Pinyin: Tái Péng Jin Mǎ; Gèbié Guanshuèi Lǐngyù
- Yale Romanization: Tái Péng Jīn Mǎ; Gèbyé Gwānshwèi Lǐngyù
- MPS2: Tái Péng Jīn Mǎ; Gèbié Guānshuèi Lǐngyù
- IPA: [tʰǎɪ pʰə̌ŋ tɕín mà] [kɤ̂.pjě kwán.ʂwêɪ lìŋ.ŷ]
Southern Min
- Hokkien POJ: Tâi Phîⁿ (or Phêⁿ) Kim Bé; Kò-pia̍t Koan-sòe (or Koan-sè) Léng-he̍k (or Léng-e̍k)
- Tâi-lô: Tâi Phînn (or Phênn) Kim Bé; Kò-pia̍t Kuan-suè (or Kuan-sè) Líng-hi̍k (or Líng-i̍k)

Taiwan
- Traditional Chinese: 臺灣 or 台灣
- Simplified Chinese: 台湾
- Postal: Taiwan
- Literal meaning: Terraced Bay
Transcriptions
Standard Mandarin
- Hanyu Pinyin: Táiwān
- Bopomofo: ㄊㄞˊ ㄨㄢ
- Gwoyeu Romatzyh: Tair'uan
- Wade–Giles: Tʻai²-wan¹
- Tongyong Pinyin: Táiwan
- Yale Romanization: Táiwān
- MPS2: Táiwān
- IPA: [tʰǎɪ.wán]
other Mandarin
- Dungan: Тэван
Wu
- Romanization: The^{平}-uae^{平} [d̥e uɛ]
Xiang
- IPA: dwɛ^{13} ua^{44}
Hakka
- Pha̍k-fa-sṳ: Thòi-vàn or Thòi-vân
Yue: Cantonese
- Yale Romanization: Tòihwāan
- Jyutping: Toi4waan1
- IPA: [tʰɔj˩.wan˥]
Southern Min
- Hokkien POJ: Tâi-oân
- Tâi-lô: Tâi-uân
Eastern Min
- Fuzhou BUC: Dài-uăng

Portuguese: (Ilha) Formosa
- Traditional Chinese: 福爾摩沙
- Simplified Chinese: 福尔摩沙
- Literal meaning: beautiful island
Transcriptions
Standard Mandarin
- Hanyu Pinyin: Fú'ěrmóshā
- Bopomofo: ㄈㄨˊ ㄦˇ ㄇㄛˊ ㄕㄚ
- Gwoyeu Romatzyh: Fwueelmosha
- Wade–Giles: Fu²-êrh³-mo²-sha¹
- Tongyong Pinyin: Fú'ěrmósha
- Yale Romanization: Fúěrmwóshā
- MPS2: Fúěrmóshā
- IPA: [fǔ.àɚ.mwǒ.ʂá]
Yue: Cantonese
- Jyutping: Fuk1ji5mo1saa1
Southern Min
- Hokkien POJ: Hok-ní-mô͘-sa

Tibetan name
- Tibetan: ཀྲུང་ཧྭ་དམངས་གཙོའི། ་རྒྱལ་ཁབ
Transcriptions
- Wylie: krung hwa dmangs gtso'i rgyal khab

Vietnamese name
- Vietnamese alphabet: Trung Hoa Dân Quốc
- Chữ Hán: 中華民國

Zhuang name
- Zhuang: Cunghvaz Minzgoz

Korean name
- Hangul: 중화민국
- Hanja: 中華民國
Transcriptions
- Revised Romanization: Junghwa Minguk

Mongolian name
- Mongolian Cyrillic: Дундад Иргэн Улс
- Mongolian script: ᠳᠤᠮᠳᠠᠳᠤ ᠢᠷᠭᠡᠨ ᠤᠯᠤᠰ
Transcriptions
- SASM/GNC: Dumdadu Irgen Ulus

Japanese name
- Kanji: 中華民国
- Kana: ちゅうかみんこく
Transcriptions
- Romanization: Chūka Minkoku

Uyghur name
- Uyghur: جۇڭخۇا مىنگو
Transcriptions
- Latin Yëziqi: Jungxua Mingo
- Yengi Yeziⱪ: Junghua Mingo
- Siril Yëziqi: Җуңхуа Минго

Manchu name
- Manchu script: ᡩᡠᠯᡳᠮᠪᠠᡳ ᡳᡵᡤᡝᠨ ᡤᡠᡵᡠᠨ
- Romanization: Dulimbai irgen' Gurun

Sun Yat-sen coined the English name "Republic of China" in a 1904 pamphlet, The True Solution of the Chinese Question.

In 1912, China adopted its official name, Chunghwa Minkuo (rendered in pinyin Zhōnghuá Mínguó) or in English as the "Republic of China", which has also sometimes been referred to as "Republican China" or the "Republican Era" (民國時代), in contrast to the Qing dynasty it replaced, or as "Nationalist China", after the ruling Chinese Nationalist Party (Kuomintang). 中華 (Chunghwa) is a term that pertains to "China", while 民國 (Minkuo), literally "People's State" or "Peopledom", stands for "republic". The name stems from the party manifesto of Tongmenghui in 1905, which says the four goals of the Chinese revolution were "to expel the Manchu rulers, to revive Chunghwa, to establish a Republic, and to distribute land equally among the people."

Since the separation from mainland China in 1949 as a result of the Chinese Civil War, the territory of the Republic of China has largely been confined to the island of Taiwan and some other small islands. Thus, the country is often simply referred to as "Taiwan", although this may not be perceived as politically neutral. Amid the hostile rhetoric of the Cold War, the government and its supporters sometimes referred to themselves as "Free China" or "Liberal China", in contrast to the People's Republic of China, which was historically called the "Bandit-occupied Area" (匪區) by the ROC. In addition, the ROC, due to pressure from the PRC, uses the name "Chinese Taipei" (中華台北) whenever it participates in international forums or most sporting events such as the Olympic Games.

Taiwanese politician Mei Feng had criticised the official English name of the state, "Republic of China", for failing to translate the Chinese character Min (Chinese: 民; English: people) according to Sun Yat-sen's original interpretations. According to him, the name should instead be translated as "the People's Republic of China", which confuses with the current official name of China under communist control. To avoid confusion, the DPP administration under Chen Shui-ban began to add "Taiwan" next to the nation's official name in 2005.

== Names in non-Sinic records ==
Names used in other parts of Asia, especially East and Southeast Asia, are usually derived directly from words in one of the languages of China. Those languages belonging to a former tributary or Chinese-influenced country have an especially similar pronunciation to that of Chinese. Those used in Indo-European languages, however, have indirect names that came via other routes and may bear little resemblance to what is used in China.

=== China ===
English, most Indo-European languages, and many others use various forms of the name China and the prefix "Sino-" or "Sin-" from the Latin Sina. Europeans had knowledge of a country known in Greek as Thina or Sina from the early period; the Periplus of the Erythraean Sea from perhaps the first century AD recorded a country known as Thin (θίν). The English name "China" itself is derived from Middle Persian (Chīn چین). The modern word was first used in Europe by Portuguese explorers of the 16th century – it was first recorded in 1516 in the journal of the Portuguese explorer Duarte Barbosa. The journal was translated and published in England in 1555.

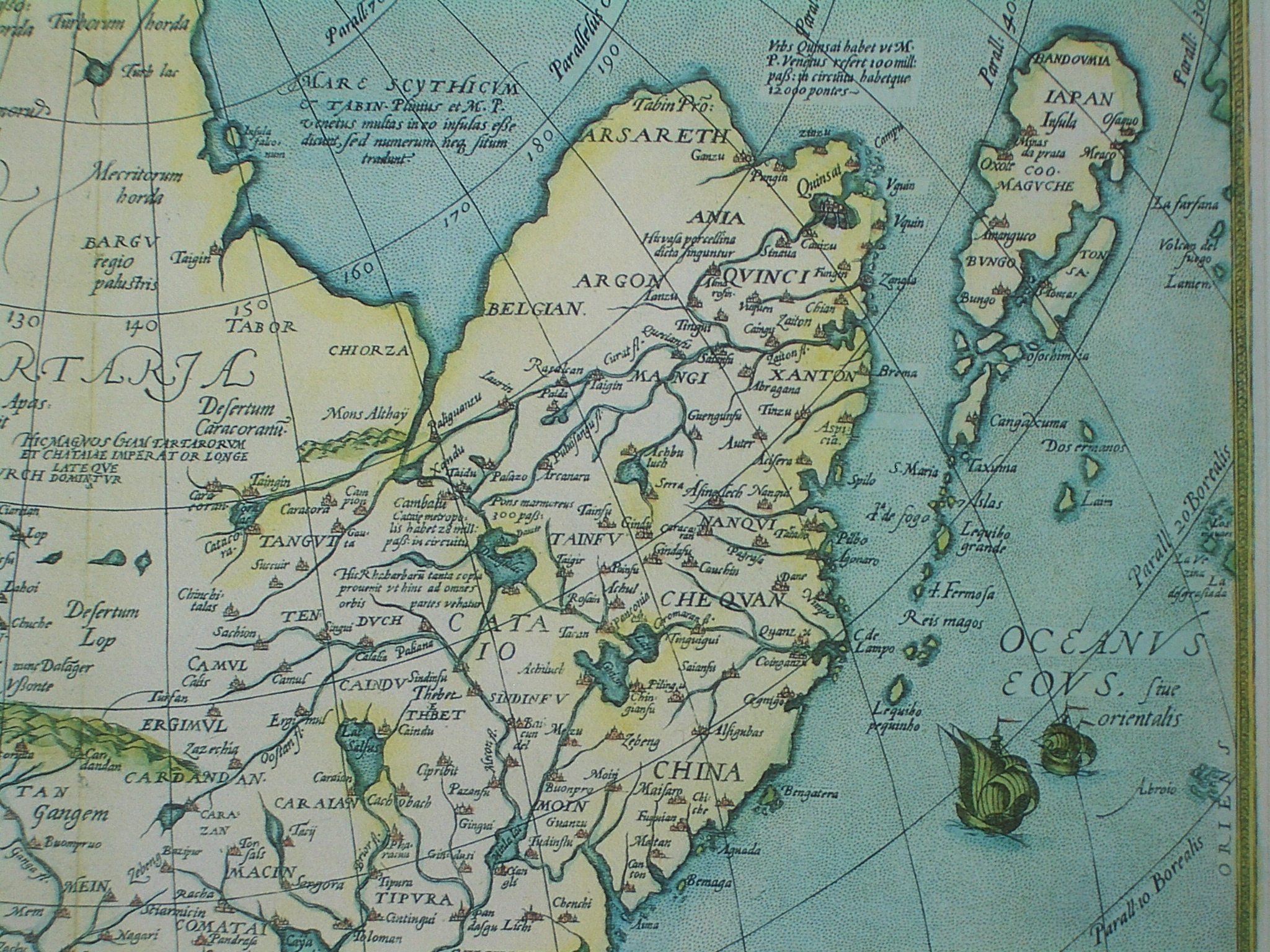
China (referring to today's Guangdong), Mangi (inland of Xanton (Shandong)), and Cataio (located inland of China and Chequan (Zhejiang), and including the capital Cambalu, Xandu, and a marble bridge) are all shown as separate regions on this 1570 map by Abraham Ortelius

The traditional etymology, proposed in the 17th century by Martin Martini and supported by later scholars such as Paul Pelliot and Berthold Laufer, is that the word "China" and its related terms are ultimately derived from the polity known as Qin that unified China to form the Qin dynasty (Old Chinese: *dzin) in the 3rd century BC, but existed as a state in west China since the 9th century BC. This is still the most commonly held theory, although the etymology is still a matter of debate according to the Oxford English Dictionary, and many other suggestions have been mooted.

The existence of the word Cīna in ancient Indian texts was noted by the Sanskrit scholar Hermann Jacobi who pointed out its use in the Book 2 of Arthashastra with reference to silk and woven cloth produced by the country of Cīna, although textual analysis suggests that Book 2 may not have been written long before 150 AD. The word is also found in other Sanskrit texts such as the Mahābhārata and the Laws of Manu. The Indologist Patrick Olivelle argued that the word Cīna may not have been known in India before the first century BC, nevertheless he agreed that it probably referred to Qin but thought that the word itself was derived from a Central Asian language. Some Chinese and Indian scholars argued for the state of Jing (荆, another name for Chu) as the likely origin of the name. Another suggestion, made by Geoff Wade, is that the Cīnāh in Sanskrit texts refers to an ancient kingdom centered in present-day Guizhou, called Yelang, in the south Tibeto-Burman highlands. The inhabitants referred to themselves as Zina according to Wade.

The term China can also be used to refer to:

- a modern state, indicating the PRC or ROC;
- "Mainland China" (中国大陆; 中國大陸; Zhōngguó Dàlù), which is the territory of the PRC minus the two regions of Hong Kong and Macau;
- "China proper", a term used to refer to the historical heartlands of China without peripheral areas like Manchuria, Inner Mongolia, Tibet, and Xinjiang

In economic contexts, "Greater China" (大中华地区; 大中華地區; Dà Zhōnghuá dìqū) is intended to be a neutral and non-political way to refer to mainland China, Hong Kong, Macau and Taiwan.

Sinologists usually use "Chinese" in a more restricted sense, akin to the classical usage of Zhongguo, to the Han ethnic group, which makes up the bulk of the population in China and of the overseas Chinese.

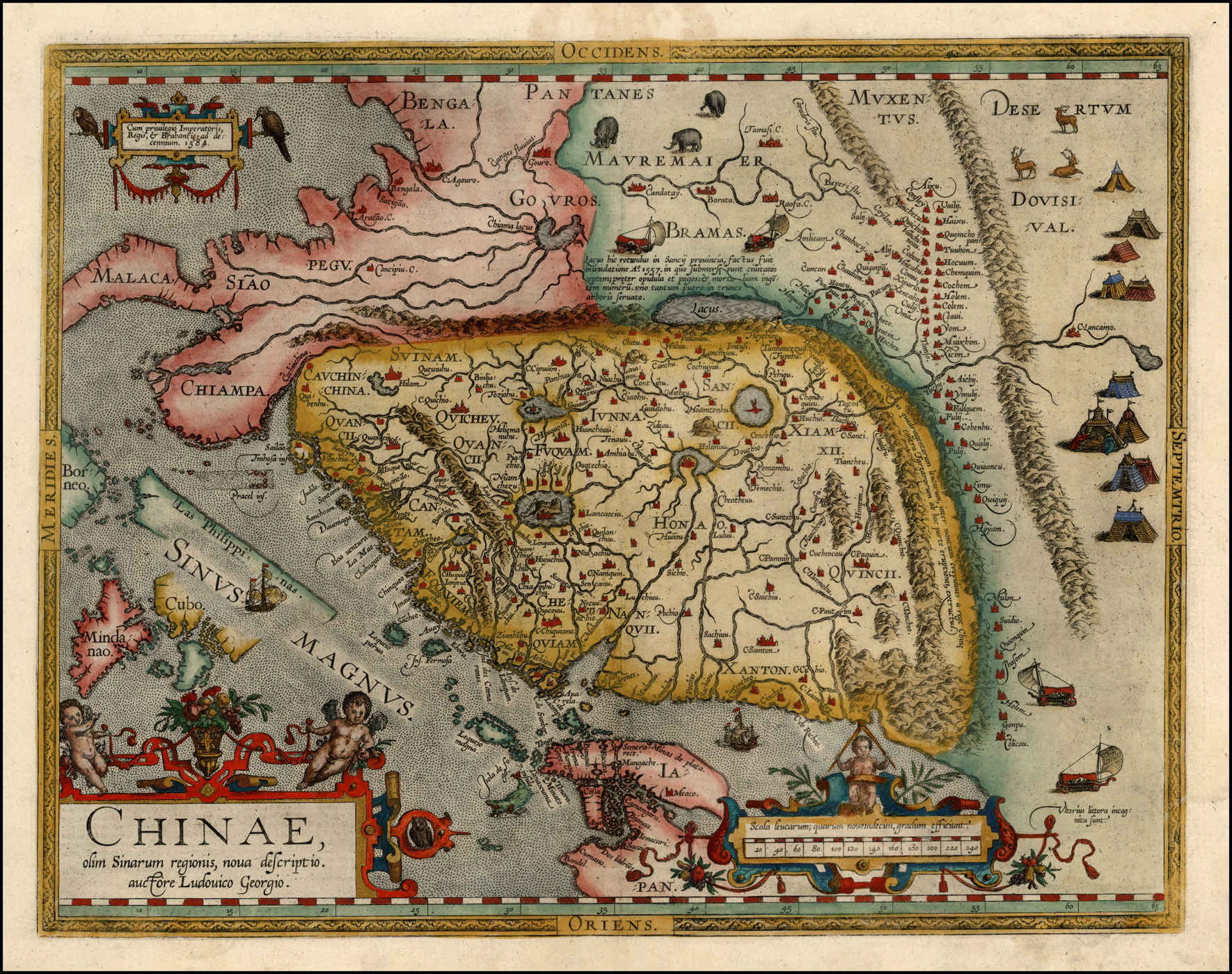
Barbuda's 1584 map, also published by Ortelius, already applies the name China to the entire country. However, for another century many European maps continued to show Cathay as well, usually somewhere north of the Great Wall

=== Seres, Ser, Serica ===
Sēres (Σῆρες) was the Ancient Greek and Roman name for the northwestern part of China and its inhabitants. It meant "of silk", or "land where silk comes from". The name is thought to derive from the Chinese word for silk, 丝; 絲; sī; Middle Chinese sɨ, Old Chinese *slɯ, per Zhengzhang). It is itself at the origin of the Latin for "silk", sērica.

This may be a back formation from sērikos (σηρικός), "made of silk", from sēr (σήρ), "silkworm", in which case Sēres is "the land where silk comes from".

=== Sinae, Sin ===
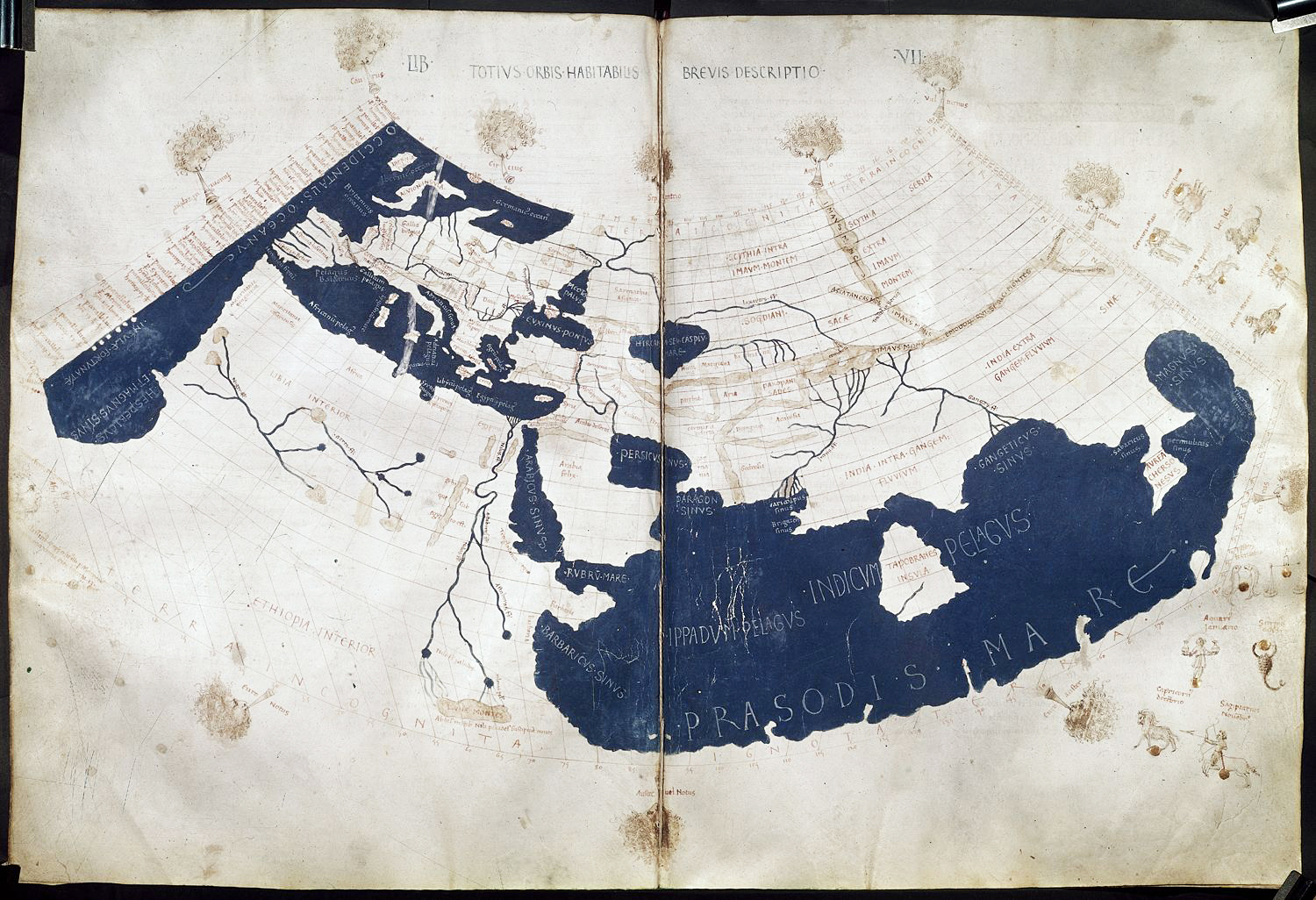
A mid-15th century map based on Ptolemy's manuscript Geography. Serica and Sina are marked as separate countries (top right and right respectively).

Sīnae was an ancient Greek and Roman name for some people who dwelt south of Serica in the eastern extremity of the habitable world. References to the Sinae include mention of a city that the Romans called Sēra Mētropolis, which may be modern Chang'an. The Latin prefix Sino- as well as words such as Sinica, which are traditionally used to refer to China, came from Sīnae. It is generally thought that Chīna, Sīna and Thīna are variants that ultimately derived from "Qin", the western Zhou-era state that eventually founded the Qin dynasty. There are other opinions on its etymology. Henry Yule thought that this term may have come to Europe through the Arabs, who made the China of the farther east into Sin, and perhaps sometimes into Thin. Hence the Θῖνα (Thîna) of the author of the Periplus of the Erythraean Sea, who appears to be the first extant writer to employ the name in this form; hence also the Σῖναι (Sînai) and Θῖναι (Thînai) of Ptolemy.

Some denied that Ptolemy's Σῖναι (Sînai) really represented the Chinese as Ptolemy called the country Σηρική (Sērikḗ) and the capital Σήρα (Sḗra), but regarded them as distinct from Σῖναι (Sînai). Marcian of Heraclea reported that the "nations of the Sinae lie at the extremity of the habitable world, and adjoin the eastern Terra incognita". The 6th century Cosmas Indicopleustes refers to a "country of silk" called Τζίνιστα (Tzínista), which is understood as referring to China, beyond which "there is neither navigation nor any land to inhabit". It seems probable that the same region is meant by both. According to Henry Yule, Ptolemy's misrendering of the Indian Sea as a closed basin meant that Ptolemy must also have misplaced the Chinese coast, leading to the misconception of Serica and Sina as separate countries.

In the Hebrew Bible, there is a mention of the faraway country "Sinim" in the Book of Isaiah 49:12 which some had assumed to be a reference to China. In Genesis 10:17, a tribes called the "Sinites" were said to be the descendants of Canaan, the son of Ham, but they are usually considered to be a different people, probably from the northern part of Lebanon.

=== Cathay, Kitay ===
These names derive from the Khitan people that originated in Manchuria and conquered parts of northern China during the early 10th century to form the Liao dynasty, and dominated Central Asia during the 12th century as the Kara Khitan Khanate. Due to the long period of political relevance, the name Khitan become associated with China. Muslim historians referred to the Kara Khitan state as Khitay or Khitai; they may have adopted this form of Khitan via the Uyghurs of Qocho, in whose language the final -n or -ń became -y. The name was then introduced to medieval and early modern Europe through Islamic and Russian sources. In English and in several other European languages, the name "Cathay" was used in the translations of the adventures of Marco Polo, which used this word for northern China. Words related to Khitay are still used in many Turkic and Slavic languages to refer to China. However, its use by Turkic speakers within China, such as the Uyghurs, is considered pejorative by the Chinese authority who tried to ban it.

There is no evidence that either in the 13th or 14th century, Cathayans, i.e. Chinese, travelled officially to Europe, but it is possible that some did, in unofficial capacities, at least in the 13th century. During the campaigns of Hulagu (the grandson of Genghis Khan) in Persia (1256–65), and the reigns of his successors, Chinese engineers were employed on the banks of the Tigris, and Chinese astrologers and physicians could be consulted. Many diplomatic communications passed between the Hulaguid Ilkhans and Christian princes. The former, as the great khan's liegemen, still received from him their seals of state; and two of their letters which survive in the archives of France exhibit the vermilion impressions of those seals in Chinese characters—perhaps affording the earliest specimen of those characters to reach western Europe.

=== Tabgach ===
The word Tabgach came from the metatheses of Tuoba (*t'akbat), a dominant tribe of the Xianbei and the surname of the Northern Wei emperors in the 5th century before sinicisation. It referred to Northern China, which was dominated by part-Xianbei, part-Han people.

This name is re-translated back into Chinese as Taohuashi (Chinese: 桃花石; pinyin: táohuā shí). This name has been used in China in recent years to promote ethnic unity.

=== Taugast ===
In the works of Byzantine Historian Theophylact Simocatta, written in the early 7th Century, Tang China was referred to as Taugast (Byzantine Greek: Ταυγάστ). This name is likely related to Tabgach.

=== Nikan ===
Nikan (Manchu: ᠨᡳᡴᠠᠨ) was a Manchu ethnonym of unknown origin that referred specifically to the Han Chinese; the stem of this word was also conjugated as a verb, nikara(-mbi), which meant 'to speak the Chinese language'. Since Nikan was essentially an ethnonym and referred to a group of people rather than to a political body, the correct translation of "China" into Manchu is Nikan gurun, 'country of the Han'.

This exonym for the Han Chinese is also used in the Daur language, in which it appears as Niaken ([njakən] or [ɲakən]). As in the case of the Manchu language, the Daur word Niaken is essentially an ethnonym, and the proper way to refer to the country of the Han Chinese (i.e., "China" in a cultural sense) is Niaken gurun, while niakendaaci is a verb meaning "to talk in Chinese".

=== Kara ===
Japanese: Kara (から; variously written as 唐 or 漢). An identical name was used by the ancient and medieval Japanese to refer to the country that is now known as Korea, and many Japanese historians and linguists believe that the word Kara referring to China and/or Korea may have derived from a metonymic extension of the appellation of the ancient city-states of Gaya.

The Japanese word karate (空手, lit. "empty hand") is derived from the Okinawan word karatii (唐手, lit. "Chinese/Asian/foreign hand/trick/means/method/style") and refers to Okinawan martial arts; the character for kara was changed to remove the connotation of the style originating in China.

=== Morokoshi ===
Japanese: Morokoshi (もろこし; variously written as 唐 or 唐土). This obsolete Japanese name for China is believed to have derived from a kun'yomi reading of the Chinese compound 諸越 Zhūyuè or 百越 Baiyue as "all the Yue" or "the hundred (i.e., myriad, various, or numerous) Yue," which was an ancient Chinese name for the societies of the regions that are now southern China.

The Japanese common noun tōmorokoshi (トウモロコシ, 玉蜀黍), which refers to maize, appears to contain an element cognate with the proper noun formerly used in reference to China. Although tōmorokoshi is traditionally written with Chinese characters that literally mean "jade Shu millet", the etymology of the Japanese word appears to go back to "Tang morokoshi", in which morokoshi was the obsolete Japanese name for China as well as the Japanese word for sorghum, which seems to have been introduced into Japan from China.

=== Mangi ===
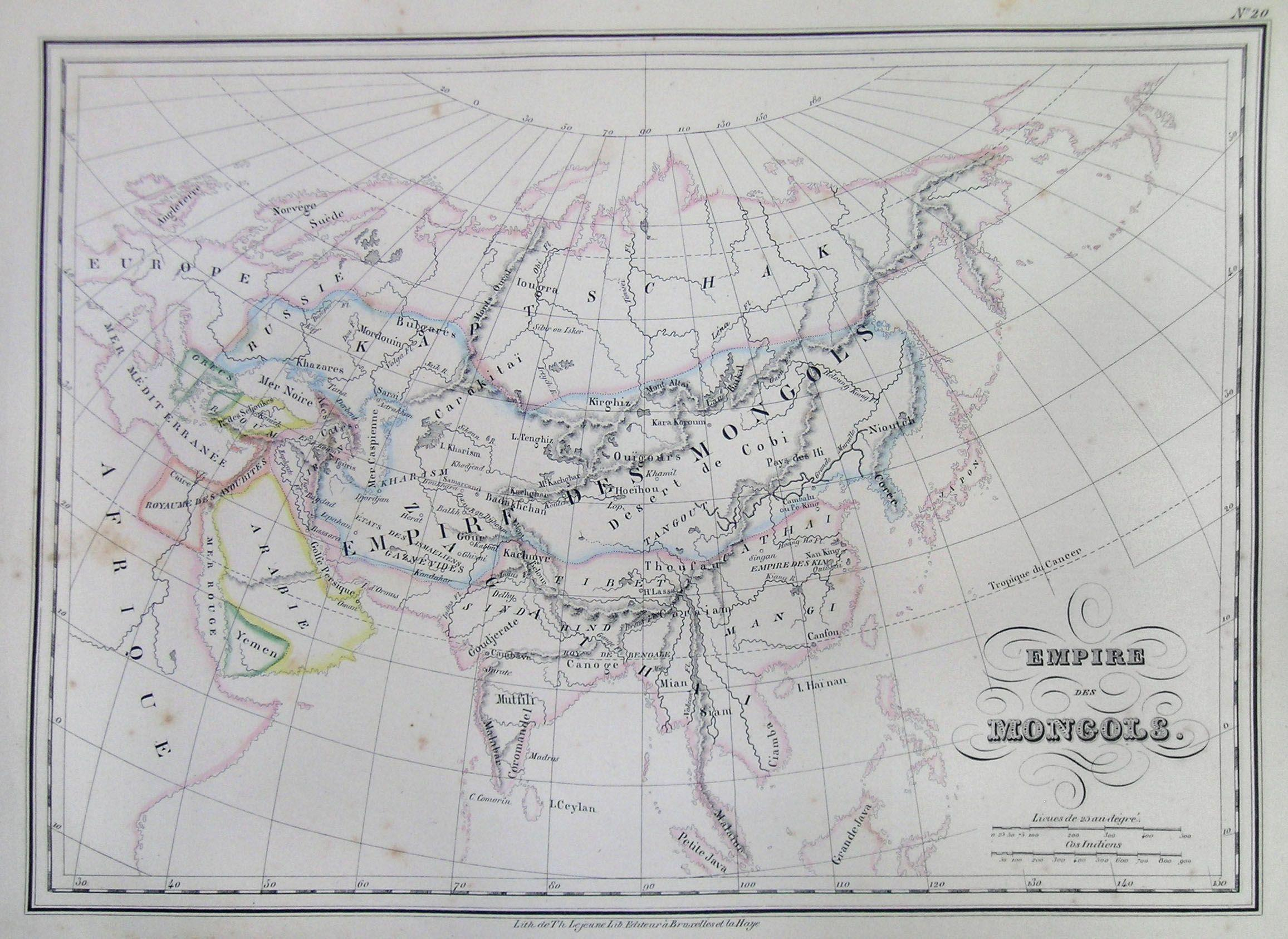
1837 map of Mongol Empire, showing Mangi in southern China

From Chinese Manzi (蠻子, southern barbarians). The division of north and south China under the Jin dynasty and Song dynasty weakened the idea of a unified China, and it was common for non-Han peoples to refer to the politically disparate North and South by different names for some time. While Northern China was called Cathay, Southern China was referred to as Mangi. Manzi often appears in documents of the Mongol-led Yuan dynasty as a disparaging term for Southern China. The Mongols also called Southern Chinese Nangkiyas or Nangkiyad, and considered them ethnically distinct from North Chinese. The word Manzi reached the Western world as Mangi (as used by Marco Polo), which is a name commonly found on medieval maps. The Chinese themselves considered Manzi to be derogatory and never used it as a self-appellation. Some early scholars believed Mangi to be a corruption of the Persian Machin (ماچين) and Arabic Māṣīn (ماصين), which may be a mistake as these two forms are derived from the Sanskrit Maha Chin meaning Great China.

=== Sungsong ===
In Filipino language, Sungsong was a historical and archaic name for China. In Tiruray, the name meant specifically Hong Kong. The name comes from Proto-Malayo-Polynesian *suŋsuŋ, which meant "to go against wind or current". Its application to China in Philippine languages presumably is connected with sailing problems in reaching mainland China from the Philippines.

== Sign names ==
The name for China in Chinese Sign Language is performed by trailing the tip of one's fingertip horizontally across the upper end of the chest, from the non-dominant side to the dominant one, and then vertically downwards. Many sign languages have adopted the Chinese sign as a loanword; this includes American Sign Language, in which this has happened across dialects, from Canada to California, replacing previous signs indicating East Asian people's typical epicanthic fold, now considered offensive.

Multiple other languages have borrowed the sign as well, with some modifications. In Estonian Sign Language, the index finger moves diagonally to the non-dominant side instead of vertically downwards, and in French and Israeli Sign Language, the thumb is used instead. Some other languages use unrelated signs. For example, in Hong Kong Sign Language, the extended dominant index and middle fingers, held together, tap twice the non-dominant ones in the same handshape, palm downwards, in front of the signer's chest; in Taiwanese Sign Language, both hands are flat, with extended thumbs and other fingers held together and pointing sideways, palms towards the signer, move up and down together repeatedly in front of the signer's chest.

== See also ==
- Little China (ideology)
- Chinese romanization
- List of country name etymologies
- Names of the Yuan dynasty
- Names of the Qing dynasty
- Names of India
- Names of Japan
- Names of Korea
- Names of Vietnam

By ISO 639-3 code
Enter an ISO code to find the corresponding language article.
