= Languages of Japan =

- Official: None
- National: Standard Japanese
- Main: Standard Japanese
- Indigenous: Ainu, Ryukyuan languages
- Regional: Japanese dialects, Hachijō
- Minority: Bonin English, Matagi, Nivkh, Orok, Zainichi Korean
- Immigrant: Chinese, Korean, Filipino, Mongolian, Portuguese
- Foreign: Arabic, Bengali, Burmese, Chinese, Dutch, English, French, German, Hindi, Indonesian, Italian, Khmer, Korean, Lao, Malay, Nepali, Persian, Portuguese, Russian, Spanish, Thai, Turkish, Vietnamese
- Signed: Japanese Sign Language; Amami Oshima Sign Language; Miyakubo Sign Language
- Keyboard layout: JIS

The most widely-spoken language in Japan is Japanese, which is separated into several dialects, of which the Tokyo dialect considered to be Standard Japanese.

In addition to the Japanese language, Ryūkyūan languages are spoken in Okinawa and parts of Kagoshima in the Ryūkyū Islands. Along with Japanese, these languages are part of the Japonic language family, but they are separate languages, and are not mutually intelligible with Japanese, or with each other. All of the spoken Ryukyuan languages are classified by UNESCO as endangered.

In Hokkaidō, there is the Ainu language, which is spoken by the Ainu people, who are the indigenous people of the island. The Ainu languages, of which Hokkaidō Ainu is the only extant variety, are isolated and do not fall under any language family. Ever since the Meiji period, Japanese has become widely used among the Ainu people and consequently Ainu languages have been classified critically endangered by UNESCO.

Languages such as Orok, Evenki and Nivkh spoken in formerly Japanese controlled southern Sakhalin are becoming more endangered. After the Soviet Union took control of the region, speakers of these languages and their descendants migrated to mainland Japan and still exist in small numbers.

== History ==
Not until shortly after the turn of the second century did indications of language appear in Chinese texts. Chinese characters were adopted and records of spoken language were made in Japan. Hiragana and Katakana characters were incorporated as a relatively accurate way to represent the sounds of Chinese characters.

=== Ryūkyūan languages ===
Chinese characters were first introduced to Ryūkyūan languages shortly into the 13th-century. Details concerning the language before then are not well known. 14th-century records indicate that gifts from Ryūkyū Islands to China used Hiragana, which indicates that these languages were tied to Mainland Japanese at the time.

=== Ainu languages ===
History records that people in Hokkaidō, Sakhalin and the Kuril Islands spoke Ainu languages, but there are also places in and around Tōhoku whose names derive from Ainu languages. According to 16th-century records, Ainu languages had no written form. Only from the 19th-century did the Ainu languages begin to use Katakana.

=== Orok language ===
Records show that the Orok language was spoken during the latter part of the Edo period in Hokkaidō, Sakhalin and the Kuril Islands; however, there are only a few speakers still in existence.

=== Nivkh language ===
Like Orok, the Nivkh language was spoken in Sakhalin and later in Hokkaidō, and the Kuril Islands. It is unknown whether speakers of Nivkh still remain in Japan.

=== European languages ===
Since the Middle Ages, owing to visits from Europeans, Japanese has adopted a number of foreign words.

Post-1543 Portuguese was the initial contact language with Europeans. This was replaced by Dutch after the Japanese removed Portuguese people from Japan. The Japanese government conducted negotiations with Western authorities in Dutch until around 1870. Since then English became the primary language of interaction with Western countries.

== Language classifications ==
The oral languages spoken by the native peoples of the insular country of Japan at present and during recorded history belong to either of two primary phyla of human language:

- Japonic languages
  - Japanese language (See also Japanese dialects)
    - Hachijō Japanese
    - Eastern Japanese
    - Western Japanese
    - Kyūshū Japanese
  - Ryūkyūan languages
    - Northern Ryūkyūan languages
      - Amami
      - Kunigami
      - Okinawa
    - Southern Ryūkyūan languages
      - Miyako
      - Yaeyama
      - Yonaguni
- Ainu languages
  - Hokkaidō Ainu language
  - Sakhalin Ainu language (extinct)
  - Kuril Ainu language (extinct)
- Unknown
  - Jōmon (extinct)
  - Emishi (extinct)
  - Hayato (extinct)

In addition to these two indigenous language families, there is Japanese Sign Language. Ethnic Koreans and Chinese make up respectively about 0.5% and 0.4% of Japan's population and many continue to speak their ethnic language in private (see Zainichi Korean).

There is a notable history of use of Kanbun (Classical Chinese) as a language of literature and diplomacy in Japan, similar to the status of the Latin language in medieval Europe, which has left an indelible mark on the vocabulary of the Japanese language. Kanbun is a mandatory subject in the curricula of most Japanese secondary schools.

== See also ==
- Demographics of Japan
- Japanese people
  - Yamato people
  - Ryukyuan people
  - Ainu people
- Filipinos in Japan
- Koreans in Japan
- Chinese in Japan
- Brazilians in Japan
- Classical Chinese as a literary language of Japan
- East Asian languages
- Deafness in Japan
