= List of sign languages by number of native signers =

The following are sign languages reported to be used by at least 10,000 people. Additional languages, such as Chinese Sign Language, are likely to have more signers, but no data is available. Estimates for sign language use are very crude, and definitions of what counts as proficiency are varied. For most sign languages, there are no concrete estimates. For instance, it has been reported there are a million signers in Ethiopia, but there are only a fifth that number of deaf people, less than half of whom are fluent in sign, and in addition it is unknown how many different sign languages they use.

According to many highly educated members of the ASL Deaf community, the number of fluent ASL native signers is closer to the tens of millions. Therefore, the statistics listed below, while taken from varying published sources, should be carefully vetted before being disseminated or cited elsewhere.

Language	Initialized name	Family or origin	Where spoken natively by significant population	Legal recognition	Ethnologue estimate
Indo-Pakistani Sign Language	IPSL	Related to Nepali Sign Language and possibly others in south Asia	India, Pakistan and Bangladesh		6,300,000 (2019)
Chinese Sign Language	CSL or ZGS	Chinese Sign Language family	China	Legally recognized by China	4,000,000 (2021)
Indonesian Sign Language	BISINDO	French Sign Language family (based on)	Indonesia		810,000 (2021)
Russian Sign Language	RSL	French Sign Language family	Russia, Ukraine, Belarus, Kazakhstan, Moldova, Bulgaria, Latvia, Estonia, Lithuania		715,000 (2014)
Brazilian Sign Language	LBS	French Sign Language family	Brazil	Legally recognized in Brazil, on April 24, 2002 under Law 10.436	600,000 (2019)
Ethiopian sign languages		Ethiopian sign language family	Ethiopia		560,000 (2021)
Spanish Sign Language	LSE	French Sign Language family or language isolate (disputed)	Spain except Catalonia and Valencia	Officially recognized by Spanish Government	523,000 (2017)
Egyptian Sign Language		Arab sign-language family	Egypt		474,000 (2014)
American Sign Language	ASL	Old French Sign Language and Martha's Vineyard Sign Language	United States and Anglophone Canada		459,850
Persian Sign Language		Language isolate	Iran		325,000 (2019)
Papua New Guinean Sign Language	PNGSL	Auslan creole (disputed)	Papua New Guinea		30,000 (2015)
Turkish Sign Language	TİD	Ottoman Sign Language	Turkey		300,000 (2019)
Algerian Sign Language		French Sign Language family	Algeria		240,000 (2008)
Japanese Sign Language	JSL	JSL Family	Japan		126,000 (2019)
Mexican Sign Language	LSM	French Sign Language family	Urban Mexico		130,000 (2010 projection)
French Sign Language	LSF	French Sign Language family. Descended from Old French Sign Language	Native to France. Spoken in Switzerland, Mali, Rwanda, Democratic Republic of the Congo, Togo, Vietnam		100,000 (2019)
German Sign Language	DGS	German Sign Language family	Germany		80,000 (2014)
British Sign Language	BSL	BANZSL	United Kingdom		80,000 (2014)
Malaysian Sign Language	BIM	French Sign Language family through ASL	Malaysia		60,000 (2013)
Polish Sign Language	PJM	German Sign Language family	Poland		38,000 to 50,000 (2014)
Italian Sign Language	LIS	French Sign Language family	Italy	Officially Recognized language in Sicily.	40,000 (2014)
New Zealand Sign Language	NZSL	BANZSL	New Zealand	An official language of New Zealand since 2006.	23,000 (2018 census)
Yugoslav Sign Language	YSL	French Sign Language family through Austro-Hungarian	Bosnia & Herzegovina, Croatia, Montenegro, North Macedonia, Serbia, Slovenia		22,000 (2010-2014)
Uruguayan Sign Language	LSU	French Sign Language family	Uruguay	Legally recognized in Uruguay since 2001 under Law 17.378	20,000 (2019)
Hong Kong Sign Language	HKSL	Chinese Sign Language family	Hong Kong		20,000 (2007)
Nepali Sign Language		Indo-Pakistani Sign Language or language isolate (disputed)	Nepal		20,000 (2014)
Taiwan Sign Language	TSL	Japanese Sign Language family	Taiwan		20,000 (2004)
Dutch Sign Language	NGT or SLN	French Sign Language family	Netherlands		15,000 (2019)
Australian Sign Language	Auslan	BANZSL	Australia		10,000 (2016 census)

== See also ==
- Deaf culture
- List of sign languages
- List of languages by number of native speakers
