= Deafness in Japan =

Japanese Sign Language (JSL), also known as Nihon Shuwa, is the unofficial but most predominantly used sign language used by nearly 57,000 native signers as their primary language. It is a convergent, Deaf community sign language developed in the late 19th century.

== Language emergence ==
=== Language variations ===
Japanese Sign Language has influences from written Japanese language, with some gesticulation mimicking Japanese kanji, or written language characters. JSL, however, has its own grammar and syntax, independent from written Japanese language. This is in contrast to Signed Japanese (SJ) which follows the sentence structure of the written language. JSL belongs to a family of nationally used Japanese sign languages along with Taiwanese and South Korean sign language.

Miyakubo Sign Language (Miyakubo SL) is a shared sign language used on the Ehime-Oshima Island on the southwest coast of Japan. In the town of Miyakubo, a shared-sign community of 3 families use Miyakubo SL. Among the three families, 29 people are deaf and 22 are hearing. Although much of the history of Miyakubo SL predating the early 2000s is unknown, it has been present for at least 3 generations.

On the island of Amami Oshima, there is a shared signing community using what is referred to as Amami Oshima Sign Language. A 1999 study of 13 deaf and 8 hearing members of this community revealed a pattern of 25 basic signs, demonstrating the home sign language.

=== History of Japanese Sign Language (JSL) ===
The recorded history of Japanese Sign language (JSL) is relatively young, with its modern form developing in 1878. In his 1862 expedition across Europe, scholar Fukuzawa Yukichi studied various deaf schools, analyzing their use of speech and sign language. In 1863, Yamao Yōzō analyzed the use of sign language among deaf shipbuilders in Europe.

== Significant organizations ==
=== Japanese Federation of the Deaf ===
The Japanese Federation of the Deaf (JFD) is a national, non-profit advocacy organization for the Deaf and Hard-of-Hearing community in Japan, founded in 1948. The JFD is an "umbrella organization," that oversees 47 prefectural, or regional, organizations with a total of 27,000 members, all of whom are Deaf or Hard-of-Hearing. The JFD joined the World Federation for the Deaf in 1959, and in the following years became more of an activist group, advocating for the education and use of JSL nationwide by gathering and signing petitions for the Japanese Sign Language Act, offering training and exams to certify JSL interpreters, and publishing JSL textbooks and dictionaries. The JFD operates under the Japanese Ministry of Health and Social Welfare, which allocates funds to commission JFD to carry out itaku projects that focus on the development, use and education of Japanese Sign Language (JSL). Their primary itaku projects are "Popularizing and Increasing the Use of Signing," where they advocate for the use of JSL in schools and offer JSL classes, and "Research on Standardizing Signing," where they develop new signs for words that have not yet been defined in JSL. The organization also gains funding through the Asian Deaf Friendship Aid Project, JFD's fundraising organization founded in 1996 that helps to fund educational resources for Deaf children nationally and in surrounding countries.

==== Timeline ====
- 1969: JFD publishes their first JSL textbook, "Watashitachi no Shuwa"
- 1976: Offer certification exams to JSL interpreters beginning
- 1997: JFD begins publishing a quarterly magazine discussing their activist goals entitled, "The Deaf Movement"
- 1979: JFD "commissioned by the Ministry of Health and Welfare to establish a sign interpreter instructors' training program"
- 1986: JFD petitions for the allowance of sign language interpretation in political campaigns
- 1997: JFD publishes their first JSL dictionary
- 2004: Joins the Japanese Disability Forum
- 2013: Headquarters for the promotion of JSL in Legislation
- July 2021: Telephone Relay Service implemented as a service for Deaf and Hard-of-Hearing persons to use a phone or texts with the assistance of a SL interpreter in emergencies

=== D-Pro ===
Formed in 1993, D-Pro is a Deaf activist organization in Japan whose ideology is supported by the "bicultural model of Deaf society." Under the bicultural or bilingual model of deafness, there is a distinction between a Deaf persons' use of native sign language as a first language, and their use of written language as a second. This also creates a dual cultural identity when balancing between the two language and other elements of Deaf and Hearing culture. Under this ideology, D-Pro focuses on the standardization of and advocacy for spatial JSL, the language in its "pure" form, separate from written or spoken Japanese. This is distinct from the Japanese Federation of the deaf's approach to teaching sequential JSL, which uses different signs, often mimics spoken Japanese, and is used with word-mouthing. D-Pro offers JSL interpreter classes working alongside the National Rehabilitation Center for the Disabled (NRCD), however as a newer organization, they have less influence on the standardization of their signs than the JFD.

=== Shuwa News on NHK ===
Japan's national broadcast news network, NHK, established two Deaf broadcast segments in 1983 entitled Everyone's Sign and The Sign News. These segments featured reporters signing in JSL to provide accessible content for Deaf and Hard-of-Hearing audiences and help standardize the language nationally. The show would feature JSL interpreters using signs developed by the Japanese Federation of the Deaf until 1995 when native signer Nasu Hideaki became an anchor. Nasu joined the network in attempt to deter the confusion previously made with interpreters developing their own signs for words in reports that had not yet been defined by the JFD.

=== Nippon Foundation ===
The Nippon Foundation was founded by Ryoichi Sasakawa in Japan in 1962 as an organization that promotes "social innovation" and equal opportunity for people in educational, political, social, and professional settings. The Nippon foundation is a non-profit, nongovernmental organization whose programs provide resources such as funding, basic needs, and agricultural technology for low-income families, people with disabilities, and those experiencing hardships due to natural disasters. They also help to fund over a dozen scholarships and grants through other associated organizations, many of which are for Deaf men and women seeking higher education.

=== Postsecondary Education Network International (PEN-International) ===
The Postsecondary Education Network international (PEN-International) is a non-profit organization that was formed by Japan's Nippon Foundation, in collaboration with Rochester Institute of Technology's National Technical Institute for the Deaf (NTID) in 2001. This organization focuses on Deaf people's accessibility to higher education in the United States and internationally in developing countries. Their initial mission was providing grants and scholarships to students from developing countries attending school in the United States to gain a higher education and bring it back to their home country. However, due to a lack of students returning to their home country, their mission shifted to providing the same resources to Deaf students in developing countries or with low resources, attempting to expand opportunities for deaf students in the workforce, increase accessibility of Deaf education and the use of informational technology in Deaf educational settings.

== Human and civil rights ==
=== CRPD initial report of Japan ===
The Convention on the Rights of Persons with Disabilities was ratified by Japan in 2014. The initial report of accessibility in Japan was released in June 2016. This report contains specific mentions of accessibility goals or necessities for deaf and hard-of-hearing persons, including existing Acts in place that are meant to protect their rights and enable access in fields of health care, education, judicial matters, and recreation. These matters are assessed through the 28 members of Japan's Policy Commissions, most of whom have some form of disability, including deaf and hard-of-hearing persons, although that number is not specified.

==== Telecommunications access ====
Article 9 states that there is a Basic Program for Persons with Disabilities that recognizes accessibility in telecommunications is best provided through broadcasts containing audio descriptions, closed-captioning and/or sign language interpretation. It also mentions the "Administrative Guideline to Promote Broadcasting for the Visually/hearing Impaired," a guideline in the telecommunications industry created to promote target goals for accessibility.

==== Judiciary access ====
Article 9 states that in court settings, judges will "at their own discretion, consider" the allowance of sign language interpretation or the lending of hearing aids. In the case of Deaf or HH witnesses, they are allowed an "assistant [...] if they are unable to perform a judicial act." In civil cases where oral argument may be required or encouraged, an interpreter may be provided by the court, or the court will request that answers be provided in written form according to the Code of Criminal Procedure.

==== Healthcare and support systems ====
Article 9 states that there is an "Emergency by Email" and "Emergency by Fax" system in place for Deaf or Hard-of-Hearing persons to access police stations in urgent circumstances.

Article 19 states that there is a "devices expense subsidy system" that provides partial funding for Deaf and HH persons purchasing or repairing hearing aids.

Article 20 discusses the training protocol of service dogs, requiring that facilities have appropriate knowledge of the disabilities they are training for and can train their dogs accordingly.

Article 21 mentions the Act on Comprehensive Support for Persons with Disabilities, which supports accommodation via sign language interpretation. Prefectural governments as of 2013 are required to implement training for and use of existing "information service centers" that promote social activity, commission sign language interpreters, and offer consultations.

==== Education ====
Article 24 discusses the necessity of accessible teaching methods and curriculum at the elementary and middle school levels. This article references the instruction of speech and/or sign language to promote students' active communication. It does not state if those accessible methods of teaching are yet available or required.

==== Sports and recreation ====
Article 30 states that the Deaflympics or other accessible forms of sports-related activities are funded by donations or sponsorships collected by the Japanese Para-Sports Association. It also mentions the increasing popularity of the Deaflympics, referring to the 22 Deaf/HH athletes that participated in the 2015 Winter games.

Article 30 also acknowledges the lack of accessibility provided in stage productions or concerts for Deaf/HH audiences. For film production, as of FY2014, financial support has been provided for production companies that are willing to provide closed-captioning that is subsidized.

=== Concluding observations report and List of Issues report ===
Following the 2016 release of Japan's Initial Report, the CRPD published a List of Issues in October 2019 and Concluding Observations Reports, the most recent of which was released October 7, 2022. The List of Issues is published to address any misinformation or lack of information provided in the Initial Report that is necessary to addressing accessibility for persons with disabilities. The Concluding Observations Report is published in reply to each Article in the Initial Report, summarizing its information and making further recommendations of policies or Acts that will continue to increase accessibility. The List of Issues for Japan's Initial Report only contains one mention of "deaf and deafblind" students, requesting more information be provided about what legislative action and financial resources will be provided to transition students with disabilities into a more inclusive educational environment. The Concluding Observations Report includes several mentions of the Deaf and Hard-of-Hearing community, offering recommendations for increasing accessibility in telecommunications, judicial settings, healthcare, education, sports and recreation. However, it does not specifically mention the methods or resources under which these recommendations can be carried out.

==== Telecommunications access ====
Opening sections of the Concluding Observations Report acknowledge positive outcomes of the CRPD ratification including the Act on Facilitation of the use of Telephones for the Persons with Hearing Impairments (2020).

Article 21 mentions a lack of resources available for communication support amongst the "deafblind" population. This report recommends funds to be allocated to "deafblind interpretation, sign language, audio description, captioning and tactile" within telecommunications.

==== Judiciary access ====
Article 13 recommends to "guarantee age-appropriate accommodations in all judicial proceedings" for those with disabilities, specifically noting the use of sign language interpretation.

==== Healthcare and support systems ====
Article 21 acknowledges the lack of legal recognition of Japanese Sign Language (JSL) as an official language, leading to a lack of training and usage across the country. The report recommends that the Japanese government recognize JSL as a national language and ensure interpreter training to promote its accessibility and usage "in all areas of life."

Article 25 recommends guaranteed information accessibility in healthcare settings, specifically through sign language interpretation.

==== Education ====
Article 24 states that there is a lack of communication methods suited to Deaf/HH students. The report recommends that appropriate resources, specifically the instruction and use of sign language, be guaranteed in academic settings where accommodations are necessary.

==== Sports and recreation ====
Article 30 expresses concern of inclusivity and accessibility within recreational sports for Deaf/HH athletes. The report recommends that "reasonable accommodation[s]" be provided for people of all disabilities.

== Primary and secondary education ==
Prior to Fukuzawa Yukichi and Yamao Yōzō's research of Deaf and Hard-of-Hearing education in Europe in 1862, the Japanese government had no interest or investment in the education of their Deaf population. Following their research, and coinciding with values developed during the Meiji Restoration, Furukawa Tashiro opened the first public school for the Deaf and HH. In 1878, the Kyoto Blind-Mute Institute was founded. Furukawa was the primary instructor at this school, primarily using finger spelling influenced by European research. The Kyoto Blind-Mute Institute prompted the emergence and development of JSL where previously only home signs existed.

Following the Kyoto Institute, the Tokyo School for the Deaf was founded in 1880. Teaching methods became a source of conflict during this time due to the Milan Conference of 1880, banning the use of sign language instruction or Deaf teachers in public schools. In 1983, the Osaka Association of the Hearing Impaired began advocating for the implementation of JSL curriculum in deaf schools. To combat Japan's compliance with the Milan Conference, they advocated for JSL to be taught as a subject rather than using it as the primary form of instruction. This inspired a similar campaign led by the Japanese Federation of the Deaf that targeted the persuasion of the Ministry of Education. In 1991, a group of typical hearing members of the Ministry of Education conducted a study on JSL curriculum being implemented in a school of deaf and hearing students. They released a report in 1993 concluding that in regular primary and junior high schools, JSL curriculum was "a hindrance." Their reasoning was that JSL was not a fully developed language with limited vocabulary that does not correspond with spoken or written Japanese, creating obstacles for students who would be learning both forms of the language. The Ministry of Education promoted instead the use of oral teaching methods or Signed Japanese.

Today, there are 110 public schools for Deaf and Hard-of-Hearing students in Japan. Public schools continue to operate under the Ministry of Education, now known today at the Ministry of Education, Culture, Sports, Science and Technology. Although there is no recorded data with specific numbers, about half of the Deaf/HH population of primary school students in Japan are enrolled in regular or "fully inclusive" schools. The Ministry of Education has provided the population of Deaf/HH students in the other various types of schools as of 2014. "Partially inclusive" schools in Japan have resource rooms that Deaf/HH students attend for 2 hours per week with D/HH instructors. The population of Deaf/HH students in resource room schools as of 2014 is 1,796 in primary school and 385 in junior high. Another form of "partially inclusive" schools are those with separate classes for Deaf/HH students in Japanese and math subjects while the rest are taught inclusively with hearing students. The population of Deaf/HH students in these schools is 1,029 in primary school and 410 in junior high. "Special schools," or schools designated for Deaf students only have enrollment of 3,093 in primary school and 1,882 junior high.

=== Teaching methods ===
As of 2000, teaching methods in Deaf Public schools use a "total communication" approach where educators use a mix of cued speech, finger spelling, and signed Japanese. The only public school in Japan that has a program using JSL is the Sapporo School for the Deaf. Sapporo offers instruction to preschool and elementary level students. The program began in 2007 with only 2 instructors implementing JSL curriculum while others use an oral approach to teaching. While the 2 JSL instructors are fluent, none of the instructors at Sapporo are Deaf or Hard-of-Hearing. This separation of teaching methods has created controversy within the school due to a divide and inconsistency of language between students in each program. In 2008, Meisei Gakuen, a private school for Deaf students in Tokyo, opened as the only school with JSL as its primary form of instruction. This is the only private school available to Deaf students in Japan with a 3:12 student-to-teacher ratio, and 2 D/HH instructors. Meisei Gakuen offers instruction for students from preschool through high school levels. The school has a "bilingual approach" to teaching, using JSL and written Japanese. The school emphasizes the importance of learning JSL as a natural first language for Deaf children under the belief that JSL is best suited for Deaf children's life outside of school as a comfortable and fully accessible language they can use.

== Higher education ==
A research survey was conducted in 2004 by Mayumi Shirasawa at the Research Center on Higher Education for the Hearing and Visually Impaired that details the population of Deaf/HH students in higher education. According to this survey, about 650 students were enrolled in about 30% of the universities or junior colleges in Japan. There is a small, scattered population of students within each school. According to the survey 185 schools having no more than 3 Deaf/HH students and only 6 having a population of 10 or more. About 90% of students who took this survey were pursuing their undergrad while only about 30 students were attending graduate school.

Of these 287 schools that Deaf/HH students attend, about 50% have accommodations in the form of note-takers. In 89 of these schools, the note-takers were paid and in 71, the note-takers were trained on assistance with Deaf/HH people. This accommodation, however, is said to be less applicable to graduate students considering the research and discussion-based format of the courses. Individual support is also often offered in the form of resource rooms.

=== University of Tsukuba ===
The University of Tsukuba has 2 primary campuses in the Tokyo area. As a university focused on basic and applied sciences, it offers resources for Deaf/HH students based on organizations and offices whose expertise is in disability research. The Institute of Disability Sciences within the University of Tsukuba is a collective of researches that primarily accommodate for those with physical disabilities. The Office for Students with Disabilities has Senmonbukai, a faculty-led organization, approved by the university's Health Center. These faculty are also researchers of hearing, visual and physical disabilities who provide tutors, work in resource rooms, and assessments of individual student accommodations. The university also has what they call a "Laboratory School" on campus: The Special Needs Education School for the Deaf. There is little information on the university's website regarding the enrollment, services and teaching methods at this school versus the main campus.

== Employment ==
The employment rates of physically disabled persons in Japan, under which Deaf/HH people are categorized, is low. According to Japan's Ministry of Health, Labour and Welfare, only 488,000 physically disabled persons were employed as of 2008. This makes up only 6.88% of the total disabled population. In a 2009 survey of 1,344 physically disabled people ages 15–64 in Japan, only 43% were employed.

=== Types of jobs ===
White-collar jobs are historically inaccessible for D/HH people in Japan to obtain. Factories, trade jobs, beauticians and forms of self-employment such as seam-stressing or tailoring are more common. The Japanese Federation of the Deaf (JFD) specifically notes JSL interpreter jobs are also common, however, it is often under poor conditions. In a 2007 survey, only 20% of high school graduates were employed in "welfare-oriented" jobs, where staff members and instructors assist disabled employees. These positions are often paid below the minimum wage. Many are also employed in "window-seat" jobs, where disabled employees are given a job with little to no tasks.

=== Legislation and efforts ===
In 1960, Japan's government implemented the Disabled Persons Employment Promotion Act that established a quota system. As of 2009, for companies with 56 or more employees to have 1.8% of their staff be disabled persons. If companies do not comply with this quota, they are charged a levy. They are also given a grant if they comply with the quota and provide an accessible work environment, which is not otherwise required. In 1989 the Ministry of Health, Labour, and Welfare began offering certification exams for JSL interpreters, following after the JFD. While certifications are now more commonly required to become an interpreter, the certification does not guarantee employment.
