= North Korean Sign Language =

Sign language of North Korea

North Korean Sign Language (NKSL), or Joseon Suhwa (Korean: 조선수화), is a sign language used by the deaf in North Korea. It is a distinct language that differs significantly in morphology from Korean Sign Language (KSL) used in South Korea.

== History ==
The Pyongyang School for the Blind was founded in 1898 by Rosetta Sherwood Hall, a Canadian Christian missionary. The school began accepting Deaf students in 1908 using oralist methods. The following year, it was renamed the Pyongyang School for the Deaf and Blind. While oralist methods are primarily documented, a version of Chinese Sign Language may have been used to teach spoken language.

During the Japanese occupation of Korea between 1910 and 1945, Japanese teachers dispatched to Korean schools for the Deaf in Seoul, using Japanese Sign Language to teach spoken language. The use of JSL in these schools influenced the development of Korean Sign Language across the country.

Before 1945, three schools for the Deaf operated in Pyongyang, Sinuiju, and Wonsan. A booklet published by the North Korean Education Publishing House states,

"After liberation, the Party and the government repaired the educational facilities of these schools and improved their educational content, giving special consideration to the cultural development and education of disadvantaged people."

Little is known outside the DPRK about the development of North Korean Sign Language, though in 2005 "The Sign Language Dictionary" and "Sign Language Learning" were published as a reference for Deaf students and their families. These dictionaries contain a distinct variant of sign language from South Korean Sign Language, suggesting the continued use of NKSL by the Deaf.

== Contrast to Korean Sign Language ==
The low rate of shared vocabulary between the two languages suggests that North Korean Sign Language evolved independently of South Korean Sign Language following the Korean War, forming a distinct language that varies across handshapes, movement, location, and orientation.

A study of similarities between North and South Korean sign languages found that 71% of signs studied were distinct, with 53% of signs having no agreement with each other in any of the domains of handshape, movement, or placement. Only 15% of signs were found to have exact agreement between NKSL and KSL. 36% had at least one agreement with KSL across at least one of the domains.

Korean Sign Language is part of the Japanese Sign Language (JSL) family, which heavily influenced the development of KSL during the Japanese occupation between 1910 and 1945. By contrast, it is difficult to place NKSL into one language family due to its heterogeny with related languages.

== See also ==
- Korean Sign Language
- Disability in North Korea
- Education in North Korea
