= Deafness in Taiwan =

Disability in Taiwan

The deaf community of Taiwan is made up of an estimated 123,000 deaf individuals who share similar values, language and culture. There are federal laws and standards to provide services (such as sign language interpretation) and anti-discrimination protections to the deaf and heard-of-hearing (DHH) community. In addition, the government also offers newborn hearing screening and diagnoses services as well as subsidies for hearing aids and cochlear implants for eligible individuals. Taiwan Sign Language (TSL) is the native language of the Taiwan deaf community and a recognized national language. It has been influenced by Japanese Sign Language, sharing syntax and vocabulary, and Chinese Sign Language.

Systemic deaf education in Taiwan was first introduced by the Japanese and then built upon by the Taiwanese government. Still, a majority of deaf individuals attend mainstream schools that use oral instruction with limited use of TSL and sign language interpretation services. Even at schools for the deaf where TSL is taught, spoken and written Chinese are still emphasized but with more resources and tools to aid deaf students. Due to communication barriers, deaf and hard-of-hearing (DHH) students have a lower literacy level and underperform on exams compared to their hearing peers, becoming a barrier to higher education and professional licenses.

== Human and civil rights for deaf people in Taiwan ==
=== The UN CRPD ===
The Convention on the Rights of Persons with Disabilities (CRPD) is a set of legal standards on disability rights agreed upon by the United Nations and serves as a reference for global disability law and policy. Taiwan formally adopted the CRPD in 2014 as part of its commitment to human rights.

- Sign language rights (Articles 2, 21.b, 21.3, 23.3, and 24.3b)
- Deaf culture and linguistic identity (Article 30.4)
- Bilingual education (Article 24.1, 24.3b, 24.4)
- Lifelong learning (Article 5, 24.5, and 27)
- Accessibility (Article 9 and 21)
- Equal employment opportunities (Article 27)
- Equal participation (Article 5, 12, 20, 23, 24, 29)

=== Taiwan's State Party Reports ===
Taiwan's initial report has been archived and is no longer publicly accessible. Its Second National Report on the Convention on the Rights of Persons with Disabilities (CRPD) was published in 2020. This report was published in both written Traditional Chinese and Taiwanese Sign Language.

==== Sign Language Rights ====
Article 21: In 2019, the Development of National Language Act officially declared Taiwan Sign Language (TSL) a national language. Schools are mandated to offer TSL as a course available to deaf and hearing students as well as provide sign language interpreting services. High schools and universities have also founded sign language clubs for students. The government recruits individuals to learn TSL, hosts open learning workshops, and have signed contracts to provide sign language interpretation for public events to encourage greater participation from the deaf and hard-of-hearing community. Organizations subsidized by the Ministry of Health and Welfare (MOHW) also hold workshops to foster diverse language-friendly environments. Sign interpreters have become more prevalent in museums and TV broadcast in which they appear unobstructed and enlarged on screen.

==== Deaf culture and linguistic identity ====
Article 30: To improve greater access to culture, TSL interpreters are provided at public institutions and public services. The MOHW also subsidizes signing interpretation and audio descriptions for movies and TV programs. There is no information on linguistic identity mentioned in the State Party Report.

==== Bilingual education ====
Refer to Article 21, as discussed above, for information on bilingual education for deaf and hard-of-hearing students.

==== Lifelong learning ====
Article 5: To ensure equal education opportunity, the Regulations Governing National Examination Rights for People ensure proper accommodations for those with disabilities.

==== Accessibility ====
Article 9: Passed in 1997, the Physically and Mentally Disabled Citizens Protection Act ensures accessible environments: construction, social welfare, education, healthcare, transportation. Moreover, event planning standards set forth by the Guide for Accessible Meetings and Events include sign language interpretation. Online banking provides card activation and loss reporting services for those with hearing impairment.

Refer to Article 21 discussed above for additional information.

==== Equal employment opportunities ====
Article 5: Anti-Discrimination laws and regulations, such as the Employment Service Act, prohibits employers from discriminating against disabilities including deafness.

Article 27: Employers must provide sign language interpretation for deaf and hard-of-hearing employees to ensure work training accessibility.

==== Equal participation ====
Article 12: CRPD states sign language assistance is built into 4G application software including sign language input for bilateral switching between text and sign language icons. However, there is no mention of this in the State Party Report.

Article 29: CRPD states the Central Election Commission and local election commissions arrange sign lang experts to translate candidate campaigns. No mention of this in State Party Report.

== Deaf culture ==
Deaf culture is typically shared through deaf schools and organizations. There are a total of 13 national deaf community associations and 44 local DHH community associations that use TSL. These organizations receive government funding for social workers, TSL workshops, and TSL interpreters for medical, work, criminal justice, or other cultural events. Deaf children are also socialized into hearing culture through family, friends, and classmates (if attending mainstream schools).

In Taiwan, most DHH individuals use a combination of Chinese literacy and TSL, similar to bilingual individuals. However, Taiwanese people do not acknowledge there to be a unique culture within the deaf community. Deaf people are treated as a collective, physically-handicapped group whom are provided with targeted social welfare services and access to education. Within the deaf community, deaf individuals themselves associate their identity to family, friends, teachers, and other members of the deaf community equally.

== Taiwan Sign Language ==
Taiwan Sign Language (TSL) is the native language of Deaf community with an estimate of 24,000 deaf signers signers as of 2021. On the EGIDS scale, TSL is categorized as 6b (Threatened) as the language use is decreasing though not likely to die out yet.

While its exact origins are unknown, it is assumed that before TSL was formally established, families with deaf members would home sign to communicate. The first schools for the deaf were founded during the years of Japanese occupation of Taiwan (1895-1945) during which Japanese Sign Language (JSL) was introduced. To this day, TSL shares over 60% of its lexicon with and has similar structure to JSL. In the past, the use of TSL was discouraged even at dead and hard-of-hearing schools though efforts have been made in recent years to recognize and promote TSL.

=== Legal status ===
The Development of National Languages Act passed in 2019 officially announced Taiwan Sign Language as a national language, granting it legal recognition and protection.

== Newborn hearing screening ==
Since 2012, the Taiwan Health Promotion Administration has subsidized newborn hearing screening in certified institutions for infants below 3 months of age. These services are offered at 259 medical institutions, of which 64 provide official diagnosis and treatment. With this program in place, Taiwan has maintained an above 90% screening rate since 2012 and reported a 98.9% coverage rate in 2023.

The average age for hearing loss confirmation is 19.72 months. The average age of intervention with aural habilitation is 31.30 months.

== Early intervention ==
=== Hearing aids ===
The National Health Insurance subsidizes hearing aids for children with mild to moderate hearing loss. The average age for hearing aid fitting is 22.98 months. For eligible individuals (based on financial circumstances and/or hearing level), the government pays for and replaces hearing aids every 3 years.

=== Cochlear implants ===
Cochlear implants are an option for auditory rehabilitation for severe and profound deafness though the outcomes vary between individuals. A Taiwanese study found significant difference in the development of receptive and expressive language skills between children who received cochlear implants before age three and those who received implants after age 3 concluding a negative correlation between speech perception performance and implantation age. The cost of a cochlear implant in Taiwan ranges from NT$600,000 to NT$1,000,000 (US $18,333 to $30,555). In 2017, the National Health Insurance Administration (NHIA) in 2017 began offering one cochlear implant for children under 18 with severe hearing loss, a program that cost NT$165.4 million (~US $5.09 million) and benefit 277 patients a year. As popularity of this program grew, a proposal to include a second cochlear implant was presented and approved in 2023, estimated to benefit 840 children within a 5 year span. Currently, the NHIA offers cochlear implant subsidies to individuals with diagnosed bilateral severe hearing loss but not to those with unilateral hearing loss, but those with unilateral hearing loss are not eligible for such funding.

=== Access to sign language ===
The Special Education Act 28 (2013) extends education to preschool students at age 3, provides deaf children with individualized education plans and services, and encourages parent participation. This Act also provides financial support based on family income and level of deafness: schools costs are reduced if family income is less than 2,200,000 NT (~67,665 USD), free schooling for children with severe/profound deafness, and school fees reduced by 70% or 40%, respectively, for those with moderate or mild deafness respectively.

== Education ==
There are a number of deaf education options available to DHH children: public school, school for deaf, private schools, 0 to 3 clinics, access to consulting services, traveling resource programs, decentralized resource rooms, and centralized special education classes. Of the deaf and hard-of-hearing student community, approximately 92% (3,956 students) of DHH students attend mainstream schools that use oral language during instruction while 8% (269 students) are enrolled schools for the deaf where they are given an opportunity to learn sign language. Moreover, 19% of students enrolled in deaf schools have additional disabilities.

In recent years, there is a growing trend of inclusive education emphasizing a full curriculum, oral language development with assistive hearing devices, and social interactions with hearing peers. However, these efforts to promote inclusive education for DHH children have led to decline in the number of deaf schools as DHH children are encouraged to attend mainstream schools. Moreover, the stigmatism of sign language in Asian society presents an obstacle for fully integrating sign language into mainstream classrooms and is a probable cause for the low usage of interpretation services in educational settings in Taiwan. Those in mainstream classrooms often face challenges in oral language development, reading comprehension, and social interaction which inhibits their self-concept and interpersonal communication.

=== Rise of deaf education ===
The first established schools for DHH individuals was established by the Japanese when they occupied Taiwan during WWII. The two schools taught Signed Japanese (signed form of the spoken Japanese that differs from the JSL), Japanese kanji (reading and writing), as well as trade skills. After WWII, the Taiwan government brought in trained teachers, both hearing and deaf, from China and established deaf schools in four cities: Tainan, Taichung, Hsinchu, and Kaohsiung. Though many schools in Taiwan began adopting TSL, the Chiying School in Kaohsiung continued instruction in CSL. Often, students would attend this school to learn CSL first before transferring to a different school to learn TSL.

As of present, Taiwan does not have an official communication policy for deaf students in public schools, leaving the choice up to individual schools. Many teachers hold the belief that deaf children should be given ample opportunity to develop spoken Mandarin first with Signed Chinese introduced if this method fails. Therefore, a majority of schools follow an oral/aural approach to education with Signed Chinese used as a tool for students struggling with the oral approach. In deaf schools, the oral method is used in Pre-K and Kindergarten while Total Communication is employed in elementary through high schools; at schools with deaf teachers, TSL is more likely to be used though the number of deaf teachers and deaf teacher-aids in Taiwan is low.

=== Deaf education curriculum ===
Deaf students will typically learn three languages: spoken and written Chinese from families and at school, English introduced in both mainstream and deaf elementary schools, and TSL though time of exposure to this language varies. The small number of syllables in the Chinese language results in numerous homophones which are often difficult for DHH individuals to differentiate. Lip reading without visual cues is also a challenge due to the fact that many words sharing a vowel or onset can share the same mouth shapes. To help navigate the tonal nature of the language, DHH students are taught hand movements as visual representations corresponding to each tone. The Zhuyin finger alphabet is another tool taught to DHH individuals to assist them in learning how to pronounce, read, and write Chinese words along with air writing (konghu) and palm writing (shangshu).

==== Pre-school and kindergarten ====
All mothers of deaf children are required to attend preschool and kindergarten alongside their deaf child to observe lessons. At this level, literacy begins with speech through articulation, lip-reading, and speech reading exercises and the Zhuyin Fuhao phonetic code is introduced alongside Chinese written characters. After they master a small set of sight words, they move onto simple reading sentences, paragraphs, and stories.

==== Elementary (grades 1-6) ====
In deaf schools, DHH children across ages and ability levels are placed in the same class where they are taught an adapted version of the traditional education curriculum modified for DHH use. Since deaf students have lower literacy levels compared to their hearing peers, teachers intentionally spend more time using pictures, drawings, Signed Chinese, Zhuyin Fuhao, and Zhuyin finger alphabet to explain concepts. TSL is also commonly used at this level.

==== Junior high (Grades 7-9) ====
At this level, more emphasis is placed on writing short essays in Chinese and bilingual techniques are employed to assist in mathematics instruction (explain word problems using Signed Chinese or TSL before calculations). In addition, by this level, most texts contain little to no visual aids, posing a difficulty for DHH students whose reading tend to fall below their grade level.

==== High school (grades 10-12) ====
In traditional high schools, the curriculum and use of sign language and interpretation services vary. Deaf high schools are more comparable to trade schools than traditional education, offering courses on cuisine, dressmaking, printing, and graphic arts. Moreover, after reaching 18, DHH youth can attend driving schools that provide sign interpreters during driving tests and receive their license.

=== Legal measures ===
Taiwan's Education Act (1997) guarantees support services to students with disabilities in educational settings. However, the presence of sign language interpretation services (SLIS) in educational settings remains low. While established systems for education SLIS exist in higher education institutions, there is a lack of clear regulations in primary schools. Specifically, in K-12 settings, only 0.2% of DHH students in mainstream classes and 5% in tertiary education apply for such services. In addition, due to limited government funding (subsidies typically have a ceiling of 100,000 NTD), students cannot receive SLIS in all subjects, so subjects with required examinations are prioritized over art and other elective courses.

=== Education outcomes ===
National standardized testing is required in Taiwan for enrollment in secondary or higher education. The primary subjects covered on these tests are Chinese, mathematics, social sciences, history, science, and English. Deaf students are exempt on listening portions of English exams but need to pass the written portion. Studies have found a disparity in the academic performance of deaf and hearing students. In reading and writing, deaf students are 3–4 years behind their hearing peers with this disparity growing as they grow older. Deaf students in public schools also outperformed their deaf peers in schools for deaf throughout elementary—though this can also be attributed to the fact that low-performing deaf schools often transfer out of public schools. In math, deaf students fall 5 years behind their hearing peers especially in their ability to solve mathematical word problems (can be due to their lower reading comprehension skills). This disparity in academic performance limits the educational opportunities available to the DHH community, especially access to education beyond primary and secondary school.

Research has pointed to late exposure to language as a cause of linguistic deprivation which inhibits language, literacy, and cognitive skills development. In addition, there is a positive correlation found between sign language and spoken language development.
