= Annetta Thompson Mills =

American educator of the deaf and missionary

- Born: Annetta Eugenia Thompson; 1853
- Died: 1929 (aged 75–76)
- Occupations: Presbyterian missionary, educator of the Deaf in China
- Known for: Founding the Chefoo School for the Deaf, later the Yantai Deaf Centre School

Annetta Thompson Mills (1853–1929) was a Presbyterian missionary and educator of the Deaf in China. She founded the first known formal school for the Deaf in China in 1887, the Chefoo School for the Deaf, which eventually became the Yantai Deaf Centre School. Adapting the Lyon Phonetic Manual's fingerspelling system to represent phonetic forms of Chinese characters, in 1908 Mills published what is understood as the first Chinese fingerspelling textbook.

== Early life ==
Born Annetta Eugenia Thompson, Annetta Thompson Mills was a child of Sarah E. Van Slyke and Robert Wilson Thompson and was born and raised in Portage, Livingston County, New York. After Sarah Thompson's death in 1858, Robert Thompson remarried to Cynthia Andrus; one of their sons, Lincoln A. Thompson, became deaf during childhood. Mills worked as a teacher in Portage for a time and then began working in Rochester at the Western New York Institution for Deaf-Mutes, later the Rochester School for the Deaf. Her half-brother, Lincoln, was a student at the school, and there Mills met Dr. Charles R. Mills, the father of another student.

== Chefoo School for the Deaf ==
Mills moved to China in the early 1880s to work with Dr. Charles R. Mills (1829–1895) at the mission he and his first wife, Rose (McMaster) Mills, established in Tengchow, China, under the American Presbyterian Board of Foreign Missions in 1860. Annetta Mills and Dr. Mills married in 1884 and the couple raised three children in addition to Charles Mills' children from his previous marriage.

In 1887, utilizing her background in Deaf education at Rochester, Annetta Mills founded the first known formal school for the education of the Deaf in Tengchow. Chinese belief at the time held that the Deaf were unintelligent or possessed by evil spirits, and most deaf children received no education. Many were ill-treated, became homeless, or were victims of human trafficking.

After her husband's death in 1895, Mills resigned from general mission work to focus on the basic education of deaf children. Since the Presbyterian Board of Foreign Missions would only support mission work with the hearing community, Mills appealed to Deaf schools and organizations in the United States, Canada, Great Britain, and Europe for financial assistance. With numerous small donations and substantial backing from the Rochester School for the Deaf, Mills reopened the school for the Deaf in 1898 in the city of Yantai, called Chefoo at the time by foreigners.

The Chefoo School for the Deaf, as it was called at the time, was non-denominational and unconnected with a religious mission, and held that basic communication was foundational. Tuition and accommodations were covered by charitable donations, and some students who were both deaf and blind were enrolled. Begun as a school for boys, a separate girls’ school was constructed in 1906.

Mills understood the importance of teaching Mandarin Chinese rather than English to the students. The school applied an oralist approach, promoted in North America and Europe at the time and involving instructing the Deaf to speak the language and lip-read. Today, Deaf advocates often consider this method to be ineffective and isolating for the Deaf community, but it was regarded as a miracle during the time period. In addition to speaking and lip-reading, relying on Melville Bell's phonetic Visible Speech system, the Chefoo School taught writing and fingerspelling. Mills adapted the Lyon Phonetic Manual's fingerspelling system to represent phonetic forms of Chinese characters and in 1908 published what is understood as the first Chinese fingerspelling textbook.

Following the model of American Deaf education, the Chefoo School added vocational departments in the 1900s, including photography, carpentry, weaving, and sewing. Aiming to promote self-sufficiency, the work developed students' skills and also generated extra income for the institution.

As part of the vision for improved education in Asia, Mills emphasized the training of teachers who would open their own schools, and many graduates of the Chefoo School went on as leaders in Deaf education. In 1909, Mills travelled across the country, advocating for the Chinese government to open schools for deaf students. The campaign resulted in the establishment of the first government-sponsored school, headed by a former teacher from the Chefoo School. Several additional schools followed in the 1910s, creating the first network of education for the Deaf in China.

Mills' niece, Anita E. Carter (1876–1945), came to work at the Chefoo School in 1906, assisting with teaching and administration. When Mills retired as principal of the Chefoo School in 1923, Carter accepted the position, serving until 1939.

== Later years ==
Mills continued living in China, residing in Nanjing, where her son operated a language school for new missionaries. Following the Nanking Incident of 1927, Mills returned to the United States and lived with her other son in Chicago until her death. She is buried at Manteno, Illinois.

== Legacy ==
By providing deaf students with the basic tools to communicate, Mills' institution recognized the Deaf community in China and established a foundational system of education. The Chefoo School for the Deaf eventually became the Yantai School for the Deaf, and in 2019 was still operating as the Yantai Deaf Centre School.

== See also ==
- Chinese Sign Language
