= Tashiro Furukawa =

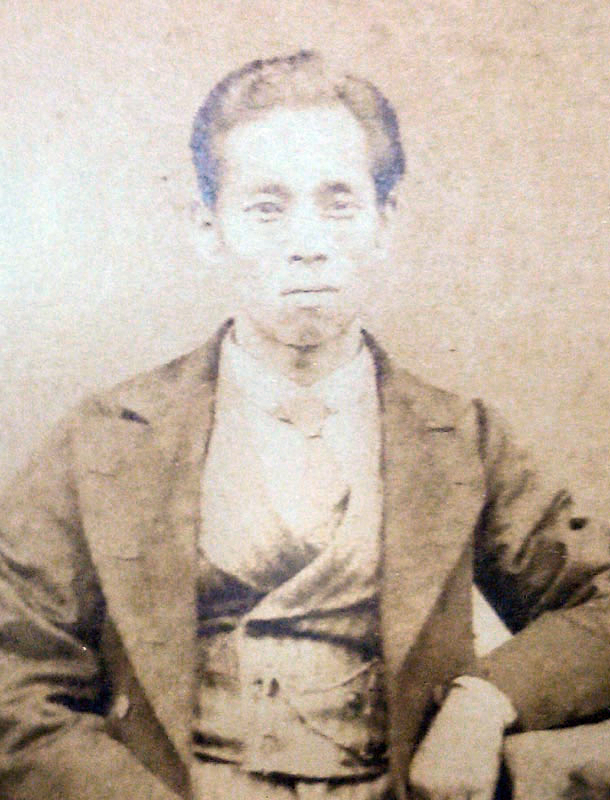
Tashiro Furukawa

Tashiro Furukawa (古河太四郎, Furukawa Tashirō; March 27, 1845 – December 26, 1907) was a Japanese educator. He was a pioneer of education for visual and hearing-impaired people in modern Japan, and has been called "the De l'Épée and Gallaudet of Japan". He initially taught at the Taiken Primary School in Kyoto and began teaching deaf students there in 1873. His teaching methods were published in a governmental publication several years later. He founded the Kyoto Moain (later Kyoto Prefectural School for the Blind and Kyoto Prefectural School for the Deaf) in 1878, and developed the origins of Japanese Sign Language.

Furukawa was featured in a Google Doodle on March 26, 2015.
