= Central School for the Deaf =

Public school for the deaf in Tokyo

Coordinates: 35°40′11.6″N 139°38′27.5″E

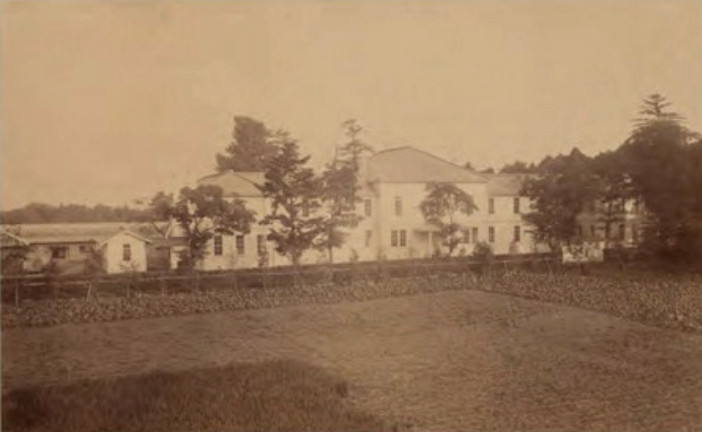
The Tokyo School for the Deaf, circa 1900

The Central School for the Deaf (東京都立中央ろう学校, Tōkyō Toritsu Chūō Rōgakkō), formerly the Tokyo School for the Deaf (東京都立ろう学校, Tōkyō Toritsu Rōgakkō), is a public school for the deaf in Shimotakaido, Suginami, Tokyo, managed by the Tokyo Metropolitan Board of Education. It was the first Deaf educational program to be established in the eastern capital during the Meiji period.

== History ==
The Tokyo School for the Deaf was established in 1880. Initially, the school adopted a manual teaching method, despite international trends towards oralism. In 1897, the director was Shinpachi Konishi.

In 1915, alumni of the Tokyo School for the Deaf founded the Japanese Association of the Deaf. This organization was the precursor of the Japanese Federation of the Deaf.

By the 1930s, the institution had grown to include an elementary school, a middle school, and a training department. The training department was intended for the training of those who planned to be teaching the Deaf.

== Program ==
Currently, the Central School for the Deaf serves students in two Tokyo venues: Shakuji Campus (石神井校舎) in Nerima and Otsuka Campus (大塚校舎) in Toshima. Otsuka is now Tokyo Otsuka School for the Deaf.

In September 2010, some of the Tokyo faculty and students begin participating in an exchange program with their counterparts at Rochester School for the Deaf in Rochester, New York.
