= Disability in South Korea =

The 2016 National Disability Survey found that there are approximately 2,683,400 people with disabilities in South Korea. Physical disabilities account for about 50% of the total disabled population. In the past few decades, guided by the five-year plan, policies and services related to people with disabilities have improved. The government has established several regional rehabilitation centers for people with disabilities and has provided and implemented rehabilitation programs in their communities. The number of disabled people in South Korea is increasing as the population ages. Regarding this matter, the South Korean government is planning a stable welfare model to adapt to long-term demographic changes.

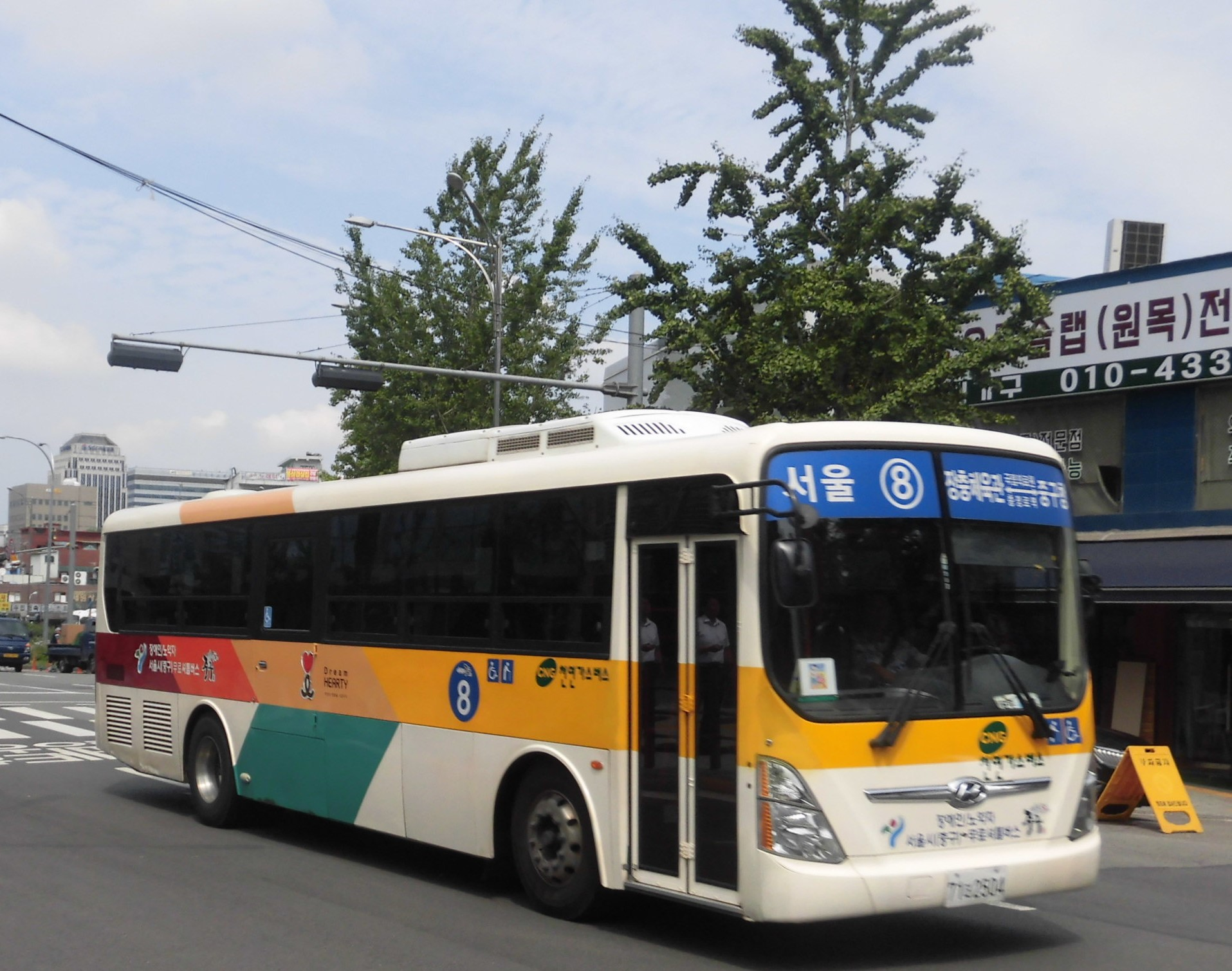
Free shuttle bus for the disabled and the elderly in Jung-gu, Seoul.

== Demographics ==
13.9% of disabled South Koreans have their daily lives dependent on the help of others, and 82.4% of them are taken care of by their families. After increasing the number of disabled people's line management benefits in 2011, the use rate of care workers increased by 10.8%, compared with the previous one.

The average monthly income of families with disabilities is about $1,780 (2,000,000 won) and the average monthly expenditure is $1,460 (1,620,000 won), which is about 54% of the average for all households in the country. According to statistics, 72% of the income of disabled people is used for medical related matters. Their unemployment rate is 7.8%, which is twice the total unemployment rate. And the wage level of disabled employees is $1,280 (1,420,000 won), which is only 54.6% of the national average wage ($2,340 or 2,600,000 won).

Before people began to change the status quo of disabled people, due to the conservative and homogeneous nature of the South Korean society, people with disabilities did not receive equality and attention. The South Korean government and social institutions also lacked long-term planning and effective support. In South Korea, the Employment Promotion Law for Persons with Disabilities requires employers with more than 300 employees to retain 2% of jobs for people with disabilities. However, only 0.91% of job positions are held by disabled employees. Many employers are reluctant to hire people with disabilities. Only 11% of people with disabilities have personal computers, and 6.9% use the Internet, which limit their access to information.

In order to change the public's perception of people with disabilities, the Korean Broadcasting System (KBS) produced three special TV programs about disability.

== Discrimination ==
Historically, South Korean society has tended to view disability as something burdensome and shameful — a condition to be managed through medical intervention or confined to institutional care, away from mainstream community life. This outlook has its roots in Confucian cultural norms around family reputation, social standing, and the concept of “saving face,” which have long framed disability as a private source of dishonour rather than a matter inviting public solidarity or advocacy.

With the efforts of people with disabilities and stakeholders, many people have begun to call attention to people with disabilities, telling the public what the real life of people with disabilities is, and showing them that people with disabilities can contribute to society. Many countries have also published anti-discrimination laws and the UN Convention on the Rights of Persons with Disabilities. These changes have also occurred in South Korea. However, because of the rapid expansion of the material space and rights awareness of previously isolated, persons with disabilities will face various forms of conflict and discrimination in new interpersonal relationships.

=== Hansen's disease ===
More than half of people with Hansen's disease (leprosy) are accompanied by disability and change the appearance of the patient, which has been rejected and discriminated by most people in the twentieth century. In 2000, the word "leprosy" was replaced by "Hansen disease". On October 11, 2004, in Seoul, the Korean Bar Association hosted a forum to discuss the human rights of Hansen patients. Media reports at the forum stated that more than 400 disabled people, who once had Hansen's disease, gathered together, known as the "Sea of Tears", expressed their experiences and called for special legislation to correct extreme discrimination and their sufferings.

=== Sexual violence ===
In 2001, the slogan of the center for Sexual Violence against Women with Disabilities is "women with disabilities do not want to be the target of sexual violence".

== Disability hierarchy and related issues ==
Up until 2017, in South Korea, disabled people were classified into six levels. Index 1 indicated the most severe degree of disability, and index 6 indicated the least relative seriousness. Mild disability included people who can take care of themselves, even if some of them required personal support. Severe disabilities included those who were highly dependent on personal assistance or assistive devices. The reason for dividing people with disabilities into serious and minor was that not only did they have different medical needs, but also some benefits were determined by this definition of severity.

Trevor Palmer, an emeritus professor at the University of Sydney and a contributor to the 2011 World Disability Report, said: "From a government perspective, this sounds reasonable, but his fairness cannot be confirmed. The system is completely dependent on medicine, this is an act of oversimplifying disability."

In addition to hoping to abolish the classification system, activists also wished to repeal a law that granted them disability benefits based on the disability or the income of their relatives. The belief stood that the allowance given would not be used for its intended purpose of aiding disabled persons.

There are also those with disabilities who are severely disabled, and whose relatives are unable to take care of them. They are housed in government-established institutions that currently house more than 30,000 people. They are rarely exposed to outsiders in their daily lives.

There are currently more than 4,000 people waiting on the list. About 70% of applicants are relatives of disabled people, so they can take care of disabled people at home without sacrificing all of their personal lives or work.

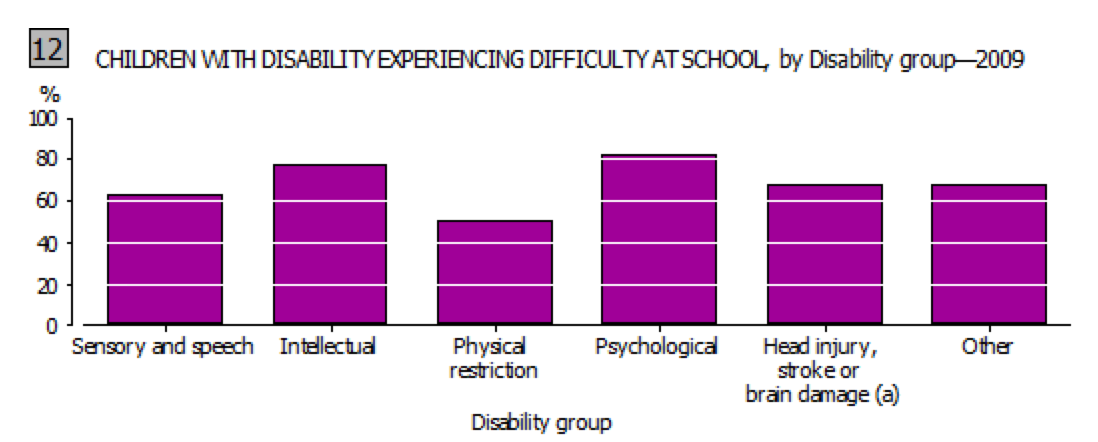

On September 5, 2017, due to the efforts and persistence of different parties, the Korean disability classification system was eliminated. Activists welcomed the victory, but a protest later began in Seoul. Parents of disabled students wished to establish a school for students with disabilities to serve the area, while others felt that a school for students with disabilities would affect the reputation of the area, and the cost of housing.

== Rehabilitation and treatment ==
Consistent with the ideas of many countries, South Korea has placed the disabled population in an essential position in our peaceful years. Technology, economics and medical development have confirmed this shift, and many Koreans believe that the ability to transform people with disabilities through biomedical physics is part of society and can show their ability to cure people with disabilities, thereby strengthening the impression of other countries on Korea and establishing a national spirit

To this end, the Korean government has developed and implemented a series of policies and programs aimed at improving the facilities for disabled people and increasing the subsidies for disabled people.

The first plan was to achieve equal treatment of the people with disabilities from 1998 to 2002; to realize the welfare construction of disabled people from 2003 to 2007, such as targeted education and job opportunities; from 2008 to The third plan implemented in 2012 is to continue to develop social inclusion of persons with disabilities, eliminate discrimination, strengthen hardware facilities, and establish a welfare service system centered on persons with disabilities.

In September 2011, Na Kyung-won, a politician of the right-wing People Power Party visited a facility related to the severely disabled and was criticized socially for taking off the clothes of a severely disabled teenager and bathing naked in front of reporters. Human rights groups for disabled people also criticized Na Kyung-won.

After more than 10 years of continuous development, the concept and system of disabled people in Korea has been completely different from the original. Previously limited to physical barriers, now the obstacles caused by the brain, psychological disorders such as autism, surgery or plastic injury are also added to the damage barrier.

National health insurance costs about $765 million in physical therapy equipment for disabled people and in the development of occupational therapy. The government has provided auxiliary equipment for low-income people with disabilities to improve their self-care ability, such as prosthetics and wheelchairs. After 1997, this equipment was also widely added to welfare protection. The household items covered are TV subtitles, audio watches and rehabilitation products such as acne prevention pads and orthopedic shoes. The most commonly used crutches for disabled people with physical disabilities and brain lesions, the use rate of electric wheelchairs increased by 22.3% and 6.9% respectively, 74.3% of deaf people have hearing aids, and more and more people with voice disabilities use an artificial larynx, the patient who has kidney disease uses a dialyzer.

== See also ==
- Deafness in South Korea
- Disability in North Korea
- Human rights in South Korea
