= Deafness in South Korea =

Deafness in South Korea encompasses the linguistic, cultural, and social experiences of the D/deaf and hard-of-hearing community within the country. The community is primarily centered around the use of Korean Sign Language (KSL), which was officially recognized as a language equal in status to Korean under the Korean Sign Language Act in 2016.

Historically, the education of deaf individuals in South Korea began in the early 20th century, evolving from specialized boarding schools to contemporary inclusive education models. The social status of the deaf community has shifted significantly with the advancement of disability rights movements and the implementation of the Act on Welfare of Persons with Disabilities, which provides a framework for medical support and social services.

Despite legal advancements, the community continues to advocate for improved accessibility in broadcasting, higher education, and employment. Organizations such as the Korea Association of the Deaf play a crucial role in promoting Deaf culture and ensuring the political representation of deaf citizens in South Korean society.

== Language emergence ==
It is unclear when exactly Deaf people in South Korea began to develop Korean Sign Language (KSL). The introduction of deaf schools in 1909 established it as a language. During Japanese colonialism from 1910 to 1945, Japanese Sign Language (JSL) was introduced to Korea. The contact between the two languages lead to the reshaping of KSL. The agreement between KSL and JSL signs was 63.35% in 1983. Another major influence on KSL was the Korean War. Following it, South Korea's and North Korea's sign languages were greatly separated and developed individually. In 2017, agreement between the hand shapes of these two Korean sign languages was assessed and the results were 15% for both hands, 21% for the dominant hand, and 23% for the non-dominant hand.

== Significant organizations ==
=== Korean Association of the Deaf ===
The Korean Association of the Deaf (KAD) is currently a member of the World Federation of the Deaf Regional Secretariat for Asia (WFDRSA), and therefore represents South Korea as an Ordinary Member of the World Federation of the Deaf (WFD). The KAD was founded in June 1946 as the "Joseon Association of the Deaf." Each year, the KAD celebrates the date June 3 as the Day of the Deaf, deriving the date from the foundation month of the Joseon Association of the Deaf and the number three which is "in the shape of an ear." The KAD includes multiple subdivisions with specific focuses such as the Korean Deaf Seniors Association, the Korean Deaf Women's Association, the Korean Deaf Youth Association, and the Korean Sign Language Interpretation Society. Aside from these, the KAD provides information on and training for the National Certified Sign Language Interpreter Test and the Deaf Interpreter Test. They also have a Human Rights Center for the Deaf which provides counseling and legal services for Deaf people who have suffered human right violations and focuses on advocating for legal changes in favor of Deaf rights. The KAD also provides sign language content and video books and vocational rehabilitation.

=== Korea Association of the Deaf Chungnam Association ===
The president of this organization is Seung Il Byun. Seung Il Byun is also credited as the president of the Korea Deaf Association Gongju MainOffice. This organization helped put on a music show intended for the enjoyment of both deaf and hearing people. They also published the book "Becoming friends with Korean Sign Language."

== Human/Civil rights ==
South Korea signed the United Nations Convention on the Rights of Persons with Disabilities (CRPD) on March 30, 2007, and ratified it on December 11, 2008. The initial report followed in on June 27, 2011. South Korea combined the second and third report which was received March 8, 2019.

=== CRPD reports addressing deaf issues ===
Along with each report regarding the CRPD, South Korea published a list of issues which outlines issues that should be addressed in the report. The initial one makes one reference related directly to deaf issues: "Please provide information on measures taken to recognize sign language as an official language." The list of issues for the combined second and third reports requests research into education policy and potential improvements for deaf-blind students and for an indication of the implementation of the Korean Sign Language Act.

The WFD cites certain articles of the CRPD as directly pertaining to human rights for deaf people. The following are how South Korea has addressed each of these articles in their reports on the CRPD. The WFD refers to specific subsections of each article but South Korea's reports are not structured in the same way so some subsections here have been divided based on content.

==== Sign language rights ====
Article 2: The initial report states that reasonable accommodations such as captions and sign language must be provided in "public institutions, private-sector employers, educational institutions, cultural and artistic business operators, etc." The 2019 report makes no explicit reference to this.

Article 21.b: The 2011 report discusses a May 2010 amendment to the Anti-Discrimination against and Remedies for Persons with Disabilities Act (ARPDA) which requires broadcasters and Internet multimedia broadcasting businesses to provide closed captioning and sign language interpretation. The government has provided funding to broadcasting services for this purpose. It also runs sign language interpretation centers where interpreters may be of service for "public offices, legal institutions, and doctors' offices." Since then, the government has been educating broadcast services on how to comply with guidelines and has provided more financial aid as incentive. They claim that due to this, "The score for Korean sign language interpretation went up from 70.6 in 2014 to 81.3 in 2018" with regards to satisfaction level.

Article 21.e: The government standardizes sign language through the National Institution of the Korean Language and their Project for Establishment of Korean Standard Sign Language puts together a sign language dictionary. The 2019 report explains the "1st Korean Sign Language Development Masterplan" and how it improves KSL proficiency and makes systematic changes to promote it.

Article 23.3: Neither report makes reference to sign language rights specifically.

Article 24.3b: In 2010, the government developed sign language video books intended for visually impaired students and auditory training programs for those who are hard-of-hearing. In addition, they created an educational website (http://www.eduable.net) and provided Special Education Support Centers (SESCs) with FM hearing aids. Also, "As of 2009, every junior and senior high school course offers two types of curricula in which sign language is used as a means of communication." Between 2012 and 2018, the number of SESCs which specialized in helping visually- and/or hearing-impaired increased by 35 (from 3 to 38). Between 2014 and 2017, 14 volumes of secondary learning textbooks were released on the English and Korean languages intended for the "hearing-impaired." In 2016, the Disabled Student Evaluation Adjustment Manual was released to ensure disabled students are fairly evaluated in non-specialized schools.

==== Deaf culture and linguistic identity ====
Article 30.4: At certain facilities for arts and culture where automatic subtitling is provided, the government provides funding for the installation costs of the subtitling technology. Sign language interpretation was available at the 2018 Pyeongchang Winter Olympics and Paralympics.

==== Bilingual education ====
Article 24.1: Neither report makes reference to bilingual education for deaf students specifically.

Article 24.3b: Neither report makes reference to bilingual education for deaf students specifically.

Article 24.4: Neither report makes reference to bilingual education for deaf students specifically.

==== Lifelong learning ====
Article 5: Neither report makes reference to lifelong learning for deaf people specifically.

Article 24.5: Neither report makes reference to lifelong learning for deaf people specifically.

Article 27: Neither report makes reference to lifelong learning for deaf people specifically.

==== Accessibility ====
Article 9: The initial report states that the Act on Promotion of Convenience for the Disabled, Senior Citizens, and Pregnant Women (APC) requires facility owners to install accommodations to guide people with hearing disabilities. It also references the ARPDA's requirements for providing subtitles and sign language with regards to accessing information. The 2019 report makes no explicit reference to accessibility for deaf people specifically.

Article 21: A provision made by the ARPDA specifically for those with hearing disabilities is that telecommunication services such as video and text relay services must be provided by telephone carriers. This is also offered by The National Information Society Agency and the Gyeonggi Province Association of the Deaf. Public institutions must provide interpreters and hearing aids for events. Freedom of speech for those who use KSL is protected by the Korean Sign Language Act as of 2016.

==== Equal employment opportunities ====
Article 27: The initial report makes no reference to equal employment opportunities for deaf people specifically. The 2019 report states that the employment for hearing-impaired persons in 2017 was 33.4%.

==== Equal participation ====
Article 5: Neither report makes reference to the equal participation of deaf people specifically.

Article 12: Neither report makes reference to the equal participation of deaf people specifically.

Article 20: The government financially supports the development of hearing aids in order to promote their use. The 2019 report does not include a section discussing Article 20.

Article 23: The initial report makes no reference to the equal participation of deaf people specifically. The 2019 report states that auditory rehabilitation services are provided by the Ministry of Health and Welfare with the intent of helping disabled children integrate into society.

Article 24: Neither report makes reference to equal participation for deaf people specifically.

Article 29: The Public Official Election Act (POEA) promotes sign language interpretation and captions are required for televised election campaign advertisements and candidate speeches. Sign language interpretation is provided for election information.

=== Korean Sign Language Act ===
On February 3, 2016, KSL was made the official language for the deaf people of South Korea. Korean was already the official language of South Korea so this act gave KSL the same legal status as Korean. The KSL Act also requires that the Minister of Culture, Sports and Tourism KSL is to create and execute a plan for the support and development of KSL every 5 years.

== Early hearing detection and intervention ==
South Korea began conducting hearing screenings and evaluations in 2007, but as of 2018, these screenings are not universal. Any newborn who does not show a clear response on either the automated auditory brainstem response test (AABR) or automated otoacoustic emissions test (AOAE) in the first month following birth will complete a confirmatory test within their first 3 months. In 2018, health insurance began to cover these tests. Prior to this, screenings were done out of pocket and with no national statistics available regarding the results or subsequent interventions.

Out of the 1,964,769 live births in South Korea between 2014 and 2018, screening was performed on 344,955 (17.6%).

=== 2010-2016 study ===
Between 2010 and 2016, results of hearing screenings were assessed through hearing questionnaires of 4 month old children. These looked into a range of aspects of detection and intervention such as the number of screenings that took place and the number of cochlear implant surgeries performed. 55.4% of live births throughout 2010 to 2016 were studied. Early intervention for 11,624 of the 1,741,556 infant participants was a middle ear surgery for treatable conductive hearing loss. Additionally, 397 of the participants received a cochlear implant surgery.

== Primary and secondary education ==
Special education in general was first implemented in South Korea in 1894 by Rosetta Sherwood Hall, an American missionary. This was followed by her founding of a school for the deaf in 1909. For decades following its inception, special education in South Korea was mostly taught in private residential schools which were affiliated with Christian missionaries. in 1948, a law was enacted guaranteeing the right to equal education for citizens and establishing that education through elementary school was mandatory and free. The Korean Education Bill was proposed in 1949 and gave schools the right to create separate classrooms for students with various disabilities, including deaf and hard of hearing students. A later amendment to this act allowed special schools to provide high school courses for their graduates. The Special Education Promotion Act (SEPA) was enacted in 1978, based on American special education laws. SEPA was revised multiple times and ultimately was renamed the Special Education Law for Children with Special Needs in 2007. This revision made special education free and mandatory from kindergarten to high school.

In 2017, 3,358 deaf and hard-of-hearing students qualified for special education, 3.78% of all students qualifying for special education that year. There are three types of school which a student may attend in South Korea: mainstream for the general population, integrated where disabled students join mainstream classes, and special schools specifically for disabled students which include schools for the deaf and general special education schools. In 2014, most "hearing impaired" students attended mainstream schools, then special, then integrated. In 2012, only 5% of special education teachers in Seoul knew sign language and schooling for DHH students focused on oralism.

== Higher education ==
Universities in South Korea are required to have a "support center for disabled students" unless the number of disabled students attending the university is few enough as determined by Presidential Decree. Disabled students have the right to request support from a university and in the case that their request is denied, they may appeal to the "special support committee." The Special College Admission System for Persons with disabilities was implemented in 1995 with the effect of raising the number of disable college entrants from 113 in 1995 to 656 in 2010.

In 2014, the percentage of students with cochlear implants who attended tertiary education was higher than that of the general population. In 2017, 70.2% (1,018/1,449) deaf and hard of hearing students in South Korea were enrolled in post-secondary education.

== Employment ==
The Korean government does not allow employment discrimination on the basis of disability as forbidden by multiple statues. Specifically discrimination with regards to "recruitment, hiring, wages, and employee benefits, as well as training, placement, promotion, transfer, retirement, resignation, and dismissal" is not allowed. The ARPDA also requires employers to provide reasonable accommodations to employees with disabilities. The Employment Promotion and Vocational Rehabilitation of Disabled Persons Act (EVDPA) requires public agencies with at least 50 employees to have at least 3% of their workforce be made up of disabled employees. For private sector businesses, this number is 2.3%. If an employer has at least 100 employees and does not meet this quota, they must pay a "disability employment levy." Employers who employ more than 2.7% disabled workers receive the "disability employment subsidy." Additionally, employers receive another subsidy when they have newly hired disabled workers.

=== Vocational training ===
The Act on the Development of Workplace Skills of Workers requires that employers do not discriminate based on disability with regards to workplace training and that persons with disabilities are to be prioritized in instances where vocational training is provided. To promote this, the government provides the "Employment Insurance Fund." The government also separately manages the "Fund for Promoting Employment and Vocational Rehabilitation of Persons with Disabilities" to provide vocational training for people with disabilities at five branches of the Vocational Competency Development Center. The Act on Special Education for Persons with Disabilities (ASEPD) requires schools above middle school level to provide vocational training.

In 2017, the employment rate for deaf and hard of hearing people was 33.4%.

== Healthcare ==
As of 2011, the South Korean government subsidized projects for expansion/renovation of medical rehabilitation facilities, medical cost financial support and tax deduction, financial support for cochlear implant surgeries, and "medical cost support for premature babies and congenital abnormalities." The government also implemented the National Rehabilitation Center for medical care, counseling, and rehabilitation alongside Community-based Rehabilitation which offers early detection of disabilities, rehabilitative treatment, and support for family members.

In 2017, the Act on Guarantee of Right to Health and Access to Medical Services for Persons with Disabilities was enacted to give the right to provide state and local governments with the ability to provide disabled persons in a healthcare facility with "convenience" as they see fit.
