= Taiwan Sign Language =

Sign language used in Taiwan

- 台灣手語
- Native to: Taiwan
- Native speakers: 20,000 (2004)
- Language family: Japanese Sign: Taiwan Sign Language

Language codes
- ISO 639-3: tss
- Glottolog: taiw1241

Taiwan Sign Language (TSL; Chinese: 台灣手語; pinyin: Táiwān Shǒuyǔ) is the sign language most commonly used by the deaf and hard of hearing in Taiwan.

There are two main dialects of TSL centered on two of the three major sign language schools in Taiwan: one in Taipei, the other in Tainan City. There is a variant based in Taichung, but this sign language is essentially the same as the Tainan school.

== History ==
The beginnings of Taiwan Sign Language date from 1895. TSL developed from Japanese Sign Language during Japanese rule. TSL is considered part of the Japanese Sign Language family. It is partly mutually intelligible with both Japanese Sign Language and Korean Sign Language; it has about a 60% lexical similarity with JSL.

After the ROC took control over Taiwan, Taiwan absorbed an influx of Chinese Sign Language users from China who influenced TSL through teaching methods and loanwords.

Serious linguistic research into TSL began in the 1970s and continues. The first International Symposium on Taiwan Sign Language Linguistics was held on March 1–2, 2003, at National Chung Cheng University in Minxiong, Chiayi County, Taiwan.

== Functional markers ==
TSL, like other sign languages, incorporates nonmanual markers with lexical, syntactic, discourse, and affective functions. These include brow raising and furrowing, frowning, head shaking and nodding, and leaning and shifting the torso.

== In popular culture ==
The 2020 psychological thriller The Silent Forest uses a large amount of the Taipei variant of TSL in the dialogue.
