= Chinese Sign Language =

Official sign language of China

- 中国手语, Zhōngguó Shǒuyǔ
- Native to: China and some parts of Taiwan
- Signers: 4.2 million (2021)
- Language family: Chinese Sign Language
- Dialects: Northern (Beijing) CSL; Southern (Shanghai) CSL

Language codes
- ISO 639-3: csl – Chinese Sign
- Glottolog: nucl1761

Chinese Sign Language (CSL; simplified Chinese: 中国手语; traditional Chinese: 中國手語; pinyin: Zhōngguó Shǒuyǔ, ZGS) is the main sign language used in China. It is not related to the Taiwan Sign Language used in Taiwan. Manually coded Mandarin is referred to as Wénfǎ Shǒuyǔ (simplified Chinese: 文法手语; traditional Chinese: 文法手語; lit. 'grammatical sign language').

== History ==
The first references to sign language (simplified Chinese: 手语; traditional Chinese: 手語; pinyin: shǒuyǔ; lit. 'hand language') in Chinese literature date from the Tang dynasty, documenting a sign for 'mirror'. In the Song dynasty, Su Dongpo describes a community that employed a form of sign language. Later in the Ming dynasty, there is a portrayal of signing in a play entitled Zen Master Yu Has a Dream of Cui Village (also translated A Dream of Master Jade in Green Village; simplified Chinese: 玉禅师翠乡一梦; traditional Chinese: 玉禪師翠鄉一夢; pinyin: Yù Chánshī Cuìxiāng Yī Mèng) by Xu Wei.

The first deaf school in China, the Chefoo (Chinese: 芝罘; pinyin: Zhīfú, an alternative name of Yantai) School for the Deaf, was established in 1887 by the Presbyterian missionary Annetta Thompson Mills. From the school, a sign language based on an oralist approach to deaf education was developed, coming out of the Milan Conference of 1880. Another school for the deaf was established in Shanghai in 1897 by a French Catholic organization. Chinese Sign Language was grown out of these two bases.

Schools, workshops and farms for the deaf in diverse locations are the main ways that CSL has been able to spread in China so well. Other deaf people who are not connected to these gathering places tend to use sets of gestures developed in their own homes, known as home sign.

In the 1960s, some signs were declared "taboo" for cultural and political reasons. For example, the sign for gold resembled golden rings, which are identified with the bourgeoisie; the sign for Mao Zedong looked disrespectful because it referred to the mole on his face; and the standard sign for Japan was changed several times, following the worsening and improving relations with this country. Colloquially, however, these signs remained in use.

The Chinese National Association of the Deaf was created by deaf people mostly from the United States in 1992. The main reason for the creation of the organization was to raise the quality of living for the deaf, which was behind the quality of living standards provided for other disabled persons. Their main goals are to improve the welfare of the deaf, encourage education about the deaf and Chinese Sign Language, and promote the needs of the deaf community in China.

== Classification ==
There are two main dialects of Chinese Sign Language: Southern CSL (centered on Shanghai and influenced by French Sign Language) and Northern CSL (coming out of the Chefoo School of Deaf and influenced by American Sign Language (ASL)). Northern CSL has the greater influence from Chinese, with for example character puns. Hong Kong Sign Language derives from the southern dialect, but can now be considered a separate language due to an extensive period of separate divergence. The Shanghai dialect is found in Malaysia and Taiwan, but Chinese Sign Language is not genetically related to Taiwan Sign Language (which is part of the Japanese family), Malaysian Sign Language (of the French family), or to Tibetan Sign Language (isolate).

CSL shares morphology for forming negative clauses with British Sign Language; it may be that this is due to historical contact with the British in Shanghai. A feature of both CSL and British Sign Language is the use in many related signs of the thumb for a positive meaning and of the pinkie for a negative meaning, such as don't know.

== Structure ==
Like most other sign languages, Chinese Sign Language is mostly conveyed through shapes and motions joined with facial expressions. CSL has at its disposal an alphabetic spelling system similar to pinyin. This was officially adopted in December 1963 as the 'Chinese Fingerspelling Scheme' (simplified Chinese: 汉语手指字母方案; traditional Chinese: 漢語手指字母方案; pinyin: Hànyǔ Shǒuzhǐ Zìmǔ Fāng'àn). It is a one-handed manual alphabet, most similar to languages in the Francosign family such as the French and American manual alphabets. A key feature of the fingerspelling is the treatment of pinyin ZH, CH, SH and NG as single fingerspelling signs, rather than sequences of two letter signs, as would be expected from the pinyin; this reflects the phonemic status of these oral sounds in Standard Chinese phonology.

The Chinese culture and language heavily influence signs in CSL. For example, there is no generic word for "brother" in CSL, only two distinct signs, one for "older brother" and one for "younger brother". This parallels Chinese, which also specifies "older brother" or "younger brother" rather than simply "brother". Similarly, the sign for "eat" incorporates a pictorial representation for chopsticks instead of using the hand as in ASL.

== See also ==
- Deafness in Taiwan
