= Zainichi Korean language =

Variety of Korean spoken in Japan

Zainichi Korean
- 재일조선어
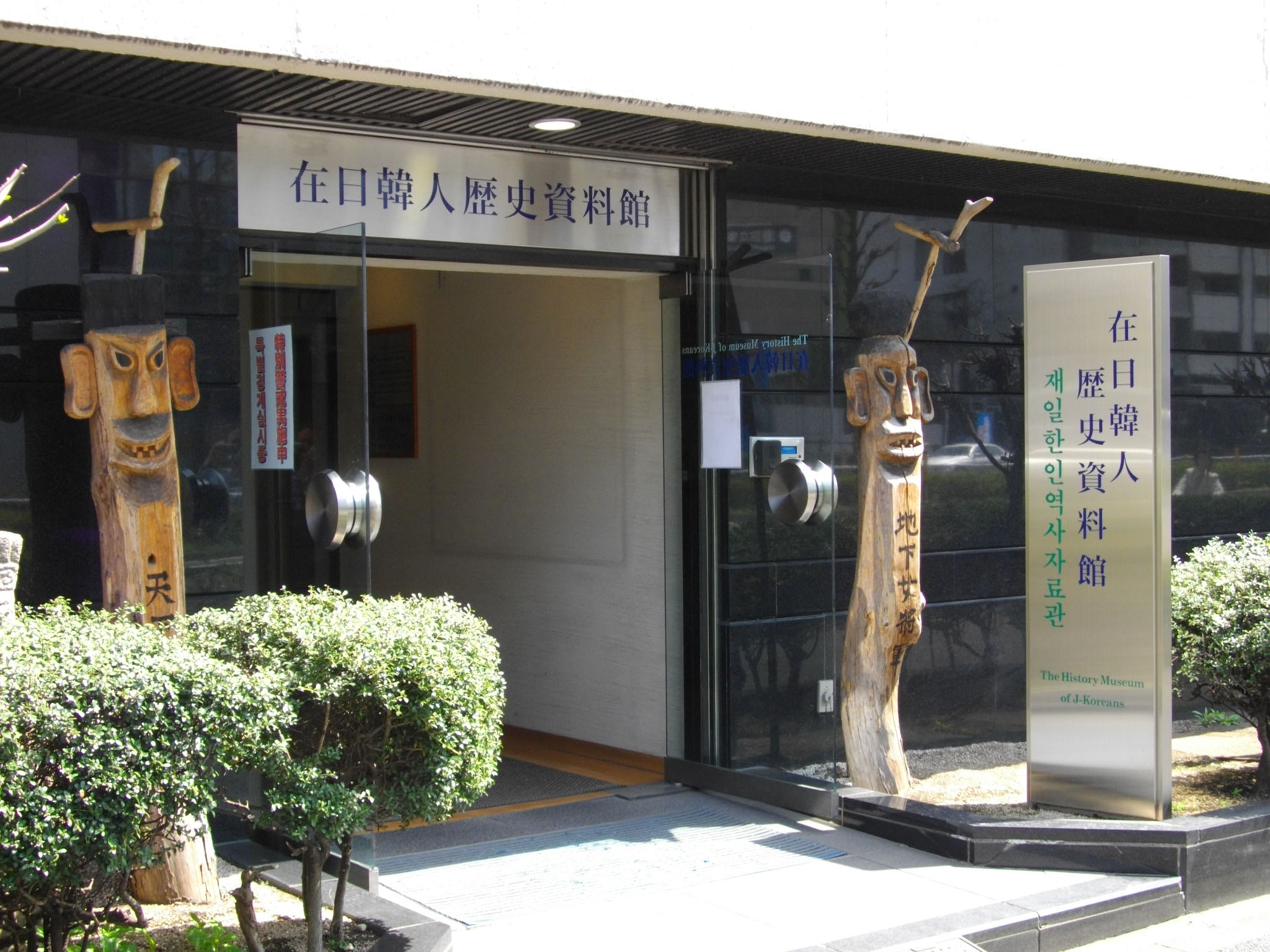
- History Museum of J-Koreans in Tokyo
- Pronunciation: [/t͡ɕeiɾ t͡ɕosono/]
- Native to: Japan
- Ethnicity: Zainichi Koreans
- Language family: Koreanic: Korean; Zainichi Korean
- Early forms: Old Korean: Middle Korean; Modern Korean
- Writing system: Hangul

Language codes
- ISO 639-3: –
- IETF: ko-JP

Zainichi Korean is a variety of Korean as spoken by Zainichi Koreans (ethnic Korean citizens or residents of Japan). The speech is based on the southern dialects of Korean, as the majority of first-generation immigrants came from the southern part of the peninsula, including Gyeongsang Province, Jeolla Province and Jeju Province.

Due to isolation from other Korean speech-communities and the influence of Japanese, Zainichi Korean language exhibits strong differences from the standard Korean of either North or South Korea.

== Languages among Zainichi Koreans ==
The majority of Zainichi Koreans use Japanese in their everyday speech, even among themselves. The Korean language is used only in a limited number of social contexts: towards first-generation immigrants, as well as in Chosŏn Hakkyo, (Korean: 조선학교; Hanja: 朝鮮學校, or Chōsen Gakkō; 朝鮮学校, "Korean School"), pro-Pyongyang ethnic schools supported by Chongryon.

Since most Zainichi Koreans learn Korean as their second language, they tend to speak it with a heavy Japanese accent. This variety of speech is called Zainichi Korean language, a name which, even when used by Zainichi Koreans themselves, often carries a critical connotation.

== Phonology ==
=== Vowels ===
While Standard Korean distinguishes eight vowels, Zainichi Korean distinguishes only five, as in Japanese.

Vowel jamo	ㅏ	ㅓ	ㅗ	ㅜ	ㅡ	ㅣ	ㅐ	ㅔ
Standard Korean	/a/	/ʌ/	/o/	/u/	/ɯ/	/i/	/ɛ/	/e/
Zainichi Korean	/a/	/o/		/ɯ/		/i/	/e/	

=== Initial consonants ===
In syllable-initial position, standard Korean distinguishes among plain, aspirated, and tense consonants, such as /k/, /kʰ/, and /k͈/. Zainichi Korean, on the other hand, distinguishes only between unvoiced and voiced consonants (/k/ and /ɡ/), as in Japanese.

Standard Korean	Zainichi Korean	
Standard Korean	Beginning of a word	Elsewhere
Plain /k/	Unvoiced /k/ or voiced /ɡ/, depending on speakers	
Aspirate /kʰ/	Unvoiced /k/	Geminated unvoiced /kː/
Tense /k͈/	Unvoiced /k/	Geminated unvoiced /kː/

There are no geminates after nasal consonants. Thus 앉자, /ant͡ɕ͈a/ in Standard, becomes /ant͡ɕa/, not /ant͡ɕːa/.

As in the North Korean standard, initial /ɾ/ or /n/ never change their values. 역사 /jəks͈a/ in South Korea is 력사 /ɾjəks͈a/ in North Korea, or /ɾjosːa/ among Zainichi Koreans.

=== Final consonants ===
Seven consonants occur in the final position of Standard Korean syllables, namely /p/, /t/, /k/, /m/, /n/, /ŋ/, and /ɾ/. In Zainichi Korean those sounds are treated differently.

Standard Korean	Zainichi Korean
Plosives (/p/, /t/, and /k/)	Followed by geminated consonants (i.e. /ɾjok/ followed by /sa/ becomes /ɾjosːa/)
Nasals (/m/, /n/, and /ŋ/)	/ɴ/ (as in Japanese)
Flap (/ɾ/)	/ɾ/

== Grammar ==
Zainichi Korean grammar also shows influence from Japanese.

Some particles are used differently from the Standard Korean. For instance, "to ride a car" is expressed as chareul tanda (차를 탄다) in standard Korean, which can be interpreted as "car-(direct object) ride". In Zainichi Korean, the same idea is expressed as cha-e tanda (차에 탄다; "car-into ride"), just like Japanese kuruma ni noru (車に乗る).

Standard Korean distinguishes hae itda (해 있다, referring to a continuous state) and hago itda (하고 있다, referring to a continuous action). For instance, "to be sitting" is anja itda (앉아 있다), not ango itda' (앉고 있다), as the latter would mean "being in the middle of the action of sitting, but has not completed the action yet". Zainichi Korean, however, does not distinguish these two, as Japanese does not either; it uses hago itda form for both continuous state and continuous action.

== Writing system ==
Zainichi Korean is not typically written; standard Korean is used as the literary language. For example, a speaker who pronounces the word geureona (그러나; "however") as gurona (구로나), will still spell the word in the former form. In much the same way, Standard Korean speakers retain the grapheme difference between ae ㅐ and e ㅔ, even though they may pronounce the two identically.

== See also ==
- Koryo-mar
- Language contact
