= Hong Kong Sign Language =

Deaf sign language of Hong Kong and Macau

- 香港手語
- Native to: Hong Kong, Macau
- Native speakers: <10,000 (2026)
- Language family: Chinese Sign Language: Shanghai Sign; Hong Kong Sign Language
- Dialects: Macau Sign

Language codes
- ISO 639-3: hks
- Glottolog: hong1241
- ELP: Hong Kong Sign Language

Hong Kong Sign Language
- Traditional Chinese: 香港手語
- Simplified Chinese: 香港手语
- Literal meaning: Hong Kong sign language
Transcriptions
Standard Mandarin
- Hanyu Pinyin: Xiānggǎng shǒuyǔ
Yue: Cantonese
- Jyutping: hoeng1 gong2 sau2 jyu5

Hong Kong Sign Language (Chinese: 香港手語; Jyutping: hoeng1 gong2 sau2 jyu5), abbreviated as HKSL, is the deaf sign language of Hong Kong and Macau. It derived from the southern dialect of Chinese Sign Language, but is now an independent, mutually unintelligible language.

== Origins ==
The origin of HKSL can be traced back to around 1949, when a group of around 20 deaf people moved from Shanghai and Nanjing to Hong Kong and began tutoring the local deaf community to facilitate greater social cohesion and standardisation of their sign language(s). Chinese sign language was the initial medium of instruction, leading to the circulation of CSL among the local deaf community, who adapted the language by developing their own signs with new ideas, concepts or things they encounter in their lives. This led to a further development of the vocabulary and intricacies of Hong Kong Sign Language as separate from CSL. For a number of years, HKSL continued to develop with little external influence, as international travel from Hong Kong and thus interaction between other deaf communities was not always feasible. With more and more Hong Kong deaf people travelling abroad in recent decades for a variety of reasons, borrowings into HKSL have become more common. The American manual alphabet was borrowed and adopted (with some adaptations) in this way, as were many other signs.

== Grammar and vocabulary ==
There are 40 to 50 basic hand-shapes in Hong Kong sign language. Signs are generally derived from conceptual representation (abstract, such as the signs for 'father' and 'mother'), visual representation (direct, such as the signs for 'to separate' and 'thick-skinned') or representation of the Chinese character (such as with the signs for 'to introduce' and 'the Chinese language') or, rarely, the English term (such as with the sign for 'toilet/WC'). Question words are generally phrase or sentence-final, while the basic word order is S-O-V. The subject and object may be omitted in conversation between two people where they are clear from context.

Sometimes, signers may speak or mouth the word while signing. For example, when signing the name of a place like Central, the signer may mouth the Cantonese name for "Central" while signing. This practice may be related to the signers' past training in speech and lip-reading, but sometimes mouthing bears no relation to the spoken language, and is an inherent part of the sign.

HKSL is interesting among sign languages in that it is entirely ambidextrous.

== See also ==
- Languages of Hong Kong
