= Japanese Sign Language family =

Group of similar sign languages in East Asia

Japanese Sign Language
- Geographic distribution: East Asia
- Linguistic classification: One of the world's sign language families
- Subdivisions: Japanese Sign; Korean Sign?; Taiwanese Sign

Language codes
- Glottolog: jsli1234

The Japanese Sign Language (JSL) family is a language family of three sign languages:

- Japanese Sign Language (JSL) family
  - Japanese Sign Language (JSL)
  - Korean Sign Language (KSL)
  - Taiwanese Sign Language (TSL)

There is little difficulty in communication across the three languages.

== History ==
The first Japanese school for the deaf was established in Kyoto in 1878. In 1879, it became a large public school. In the following year, Tokyo opened a large public school for deaf children. Initially, what was being taught in the school located in Kyoto was different from what was being taught in the school in Tokyo. It was not until 1908 where a symposium for educating the hearing impaired was held that the education became more standardized. This symposium is largely responsible for the inception of JSL.

JSL's influence in TSL and KSL is largely due to Japan's colonial presence in both Korea and Taiwan respectively. Japan occupied Korea from 1910 to 1945 and Taiwan from 1895 to 1945. During these periods, Japan established schools for the hearing impaired and sent teachers from their previously established Japan schools to teach. According to Ethnologue, sign language had been used in Korea since 1889, predating the Japanese occupation, with use in schools since 1908. TSL dates from 1895, during the colonial period, when two schools for the deaf were established on north and south of the island.

== Functional markers ==
JSL is mutually intelligible with both KSL and TSL. This means that although Japanese, Korean, and Taiwanese Mandarin are unrelated oral languages, someone who uses JSL can effectively communicate with someone who uses TSL or KSL with little difficulty. TSL shares about 60% of its vocabulary with JSL, but the similarities between the languages do not entirely stem from a similar vocabulary. They share many of the same grammatical features. The same can be said about KSL.

JSL family languages are characterized by grammatical structures and features which are not found in the oral languages of the surrounding community. Those using JSL, KSL and TSL are able to interact easily because of the commonalities they all share, such as grammatical features and functional markers. For example, a feature unique to these three languages is the lexical encoding of gender. Some signs when made with the thumb indicate a male, while the corresponding signs made with the little finger indicate a female.

As in other sign languages, they incorporate nonmanual markers with lexical, syntactic, discourse, and affective functions. These include brow raising and furrowing, frowning, head shaking and nodding, and leaning and shifting the torso.

== Other sign languages in Japan, Korea and Taiwan ==
Some communities where deafness is relatively common and which have historically had little contact with mainland Japan have formed their own village sign languages:

- Koniya Sign Language in Amami Ōshima, Japan
- Miyakubo Sign Language in Miyakubo, Ehime, Japan

The increase in communication have led to an increasing influence of the Japanese sign over the village forms.
