= Japanese Federation of the Deaf =

Japanese organization for Deaf people

- Founded: May 25, 1947
- Location: SK Bldg. 8F, 130 Yamabuki-cho, Shinjuku-ku, Tokyo 162-0801, Japan
- Region served: Japan
- Key people: Fujisaburo Ishino, President
- Website: http://www.jfd.or.jp/en/

The Japanese Federation of the Deaf (財団法人全日本ろうあ連盟, Zaidan hōjin zen-nihon rōa renmei) (JFD) is the national organization of the Deaf in Japan. JFD is also a member organization of the World Federation of the Deaf.

The JFD supports Deaf culture in Japan and works to revise laws that prevent the Deaf in Japan from participating in various professions and activities. In addition, JFD helps to incorporate Japanese Sign Language into education systems for the Deaf and supports the sign language interpreter system.

The JFD is a politically independent national organization with limited financial resources. The 47 prefectural associations are organized in ways which constrain political action, but which are able to access to government funding which benefits its members and related constituencies.

The JFD has influenced the government to pass laws for the welfare of the Deaf and implementation of the Sign Language interpreter system.

== History ==
The JFD was founded May 25, 1947, and held its first National Congress in Kyoto May 10, 1948. Its pre-war roots arise from the Japanese Association of the Deaf, which was established in 1915 by alumni of the Tokyo School for the Deaf.

As times changed, the JFD officially registered with the Ministry of Health and Welfare May 20, 1950.

Throughout its history the JFD has held many conferences and events for the deaf in Japan, including sporting events and legal seminars.

In 1968 a campaign was organized by the JFD to pressure the government of Japan to allow the Deaf the right to obtain driver's licences, a right that had been withheld due to the Deaf's legal status as "quasi-incompetent persons".

In 1969 The JFD began publishing text books and other learning materials relating to sign language and Deafness and continues to publish newsletters and updated text books today. The JFD began giving certification exams for sign interpreters in 1976 and helped establish the National Training Institution of Sign Language in 2002 for the purpose of educating sign language interpreters.

As a result of the classification the Deaf as "quasi-incompetent persons" they were considered "incompetent due to diminished mental and/or physical capacity and wasteful habit". They were not allowed to perform legal acts related to property and were not able to apply for housing loans nor to succeed family businesses. This status was challenged by the JFD, and in 1979 they succeeded in having Article 11 of Japan's Civil Code amended; thereby allowing the Deaf to participate as fully functional persons in legal matters.

In 2006, the National Police Agency began the process of revising Japanese laws about issuing driver licenses to persons with deafness.

=== Seahorse logo and mascot ===
The seahorse logo of the Deaf community in Japan

The seahorse is the recognized symbol of the Deaf community in Japan. According to Japanese legend, dragons have no ears and are deaf. The ears of the dragons fell into the ocean, where they became seahorses. The former "dragons ears" are graphically represented by the seahorse as the JFD logo and mascot; and the graphic mark is also found in other Deaf community logos. For example, the JFD seahorse graphic has been incorporated in the logos of other subsequently formed Deaf organizations, such as the Tokyo Federation of the Deaf and the Japanese Deaf Table Tennis Association.

== Network of relationships ==
The Federation has member associations in all 47 Japanese prefectures, which are coordinated on the national level by the General Assembly and the Board of Directors of the JFD.

In addition, JFD also works closely with the National Research Association for Sign Language Interpretation, the Japanese Association of Sign Language Interpreters (JASI), and the National Center of Sign Language Education.

The JFD has offices in both Tokyo and Kyoto.

=== International context ===
As a member of the World Federation of the Deaf, which has consultative status with the United Nations, the JFD works to bring the views of the Deaf in Japan to the international level.

=== Tōhoku earthquake and tsunami ===
The JFD's networks of relationships were challenged and strengthened by the 2011 Tōhoku earthquake and tsunami. The JFD were also among those arranging relief supplies for survivors.

During the crisis, the Japanese government provided JSL interpreting at press conferences related to the earthquake and tsunami. Television broadcasts of the press conferences of Prime Minister Naoto Kan and the Chief Cabinet Secretary Yukio Edano included simultaneous JSL interpreters standing next to the Japanese flag on the same platform.
