= Korean Sign Language =

Deaf sign language of South Korea

- Native to: South Korea
- Native speakers: 180,000 (2008)
- Language family: Japanese Sign Language?: Korean Sign Language

Language codes
- ISO 639-2: sgn
- ISO 639-3: kvk
- Glottolog: kore1273

- Korean Sign Language
- Hangul: 한국 수화 언어
- Hanja: 韓國手話言語
- RR: Hanguk suhwa eoneo
- MR: Han'guk suhwa ŏnŏ

Short name
- Hangul: 한국 수어
- Hanja: 韓國手語
- RR: Hanguk sueo
- MR: Han'guk suŏ

Korean Sign Language or KSL (Korean: 한국 수화 언어 or short name 한국 수어) is a sign language used for deaf communities of South Korea. It is one of two official languages in the country, alongside Korean.

== Beginnings ==
The beginnings of KSL date from 1889, although standardization efforts have only begun in 2000. The first South Korean school for the Deaf was established on April 1, 1913, in Seoul, and it was renamed as the National School for the Deaf in 1945, to be later renamed the Seoul School for the Deaf in 1951.

== Commonality ==
Korean Sign Language and North Korean Sign Language (NKSL) diverged after the division of the Korean peninsula in 1945, due to lack of exchange. Although the origins of KSL predate the Japanese colonial period (de jure beginning 1910), the sign language developed some features in common with Japanese Sign Language (JSL) grammar when Korea was under Japanese rule. KSL is considered part of the Japanese Sign Language family.

== Users ==
According to the South Korean Ministry of Health and Welfare, there were 252,779 people with hearing impairment and 18,275 people with language disorders in South Korea as of late 2014. Recent estimated figures for the number of Deaf people in South Korea range from 180,000 to 300,000. This is approximately 0.36%–0.6% of the population of South Korea.

== Official status ==
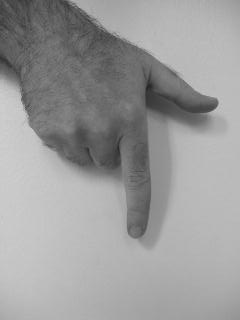
The KSL sign for the letter ㄱ (giyeok).

On 31 December 2015, the South Korean National Assembly passed Legislation to recognize Korean Sign Language as one of Korea's official languages. There were two bills and two policies passed under this legislation which were "Korean Sign Language Standard Policy", "Sign Language Bill", "Korean Sign Language Bill" and "Sign Language and Deaf Culture Standard Policy", which were then merged as The Fundamental Law of Korean Sign Language. The legislation opens the way for better access and improved communication in education, employment, medical and legal settings, as well as religious and cultural practices. Proposals within the legislation consisted of the national and regional policy and the enactment for education of Korean Sign Language which promotes and distributes the information for creating a better environment to use Korean Sign Language. Furthermore, the Korean Sign Language Improvement Planning needs to be conducted every five years and research and investigation of the use of Korean Sign Language for the Deaf need to be conducted every three years.

KSL gestures are evaluated using three usability criteria: Intuitiveness, preference, and physical stress. Intuitiveness is the link between the gesture itself and its meaning. Preference is how liked, or disliked, the gesture is when presented. Physical stress refers to how much strain the gesture puts on the body to perform. The ideal gesture is one that has a clear link to its meaning, is well liked as a physical expression, and does not cause unnecessary stress to present.

A study was performed in 2013 to test the Korean Sign Language gestures under the three criteria. This study found that user-designed gestures would often perform better than official KSL gestures in the areas of preference and physical stress. The study also showed that there was a strong link between a gesture’s intuitiveness and the preference of the user. A weaker link was shown between preference and physical stress, making intuitiveness a strong evaluation point in KSL. This study showed the weaknesses in the current KSL format compared to the strengths of user-designed gestures.

The study performed by Korea Institute of Science and Technology in 2013 found, “Compared with other modalities of interaction, the use of gestures has many advantages,” (Woojin 2013). These advantages include: gestures are basic form of interaction, next to speech. Gestures are able to convey a number of meanings, this is present through other sign languages such as American Sign Language. KSL has military uses such as a method of communication when voice based and keyboard and mouse-based interaction is not possible. Commanders give hand signals to other members to convey messages to one another without alerting nearby forces. KSL also is used in hospital settings within the operating rooms. Gestures are used to communicate in environments where the need for sanitation prevent other forms of communication. The gestures encourage the breaking up of information. Each gesture has one meaning, easing the burden of human-computer interaction. Gestures are easily used with other methods, such as vocal communication. This is seen in other sign languages through mouthing out the word of each gesture. Using hands in order to communicate through gestures reduces physical stress by using simple gestures that put little strain on the arms and hands.

The Korean Sign Language is managed and catalogued by the National Institute of the Korean Language (NIKL), which is a government agency tasked with providing authoritative commentary on Korean language in general. The NIKL, along with the Ministry of Culture, Sports, and Tourism, has worked to standardize KSL starting in 2000, publishing the first official KSL dictionary in 2005, as well as a common phrasebook by 2012. However, the current resources for KSL produced by the government have been criticized for not representing the language used by native signers due to a lack of inclusion from them and being based on artificial translation from spoken Korean. Reportedly, the quality of KSL interpretation as used in the public sphere is poor, with "far lower than 50 percent" of the intended message being understood by Deaf people in standard media interpretations. The officially sanctioned signs for LGBT concepts have been particularly disparaged for being stigmatizing and overly sexualized, and an advocacy group named Korean Deaf LGBT was formed in 2019 to find and create alternative and new signs, which were first disseminated in 2021 and have gained significant usage among Deaf LGBT communities, allies and human rights groups.

=== Korean Sign Language Act ===
The Korean Sign Language Act (한국수화언어법; 韓國手話言語法; Hanguk Suhwa Eoneo Beop), which was adopted on 3 February 2016 and came into effect on 4 August 2016, established Korean Sign Language as an official language for the Deaf in South Korea equal in status with Korean. The law also stipulates that the national and local governments are required to provide translation services in Korean Sign Language to Deaf individuals who need them. After Korean Sign Language had been established, it became a requirement for there to be signed interpretations in court. KSL is also used during public events and social services programs. South Korea offers sign language courses for hearing. Special sign language instruction courses are available for parents with deaf children.

== Functional markers ==
KSL, like other sign languages, incorporates nonmanual markers with lexical, syntactic, discourse, and affective functions. These include brow raising and furrowing, frowning, head shaking and nodding, and leaning and shifting the torso.

== Korean manual alphabet ==
The Korean manual alphabet is used by the Deaf in South Korea who speak Korean Sign Language. It is a one-handed alphabet that mimics the shapes of the letters in Hangul, and is used when signing Korean as well as being integrated into KSL.

=== Consonants ===
The only letter with motion as a component is ssang siot (ㅆ), which starts as two crossed fingers pointing down and then snaps open.

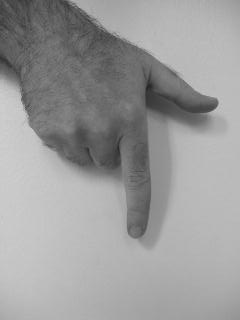
ㄱ g

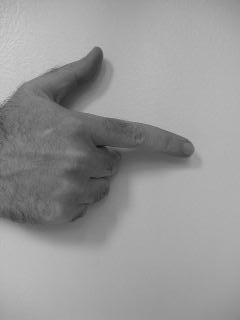
ㄴ n

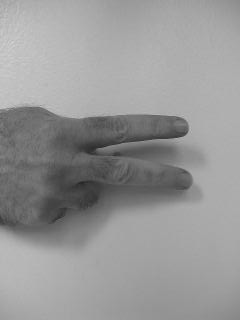
ㄷ d

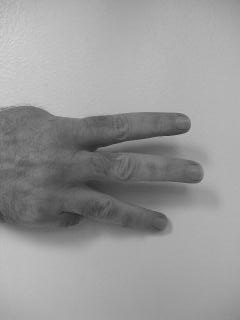
ㄹ r, l

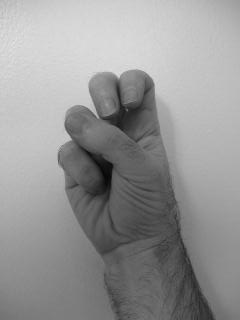
ㅁ m

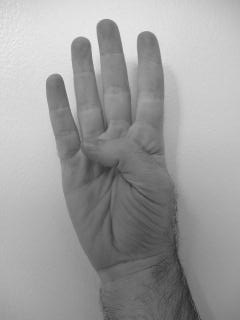
ㅂ b

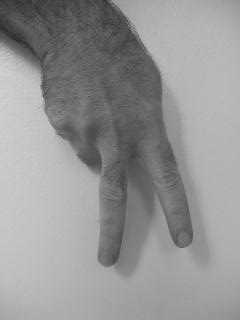
ㅅ s

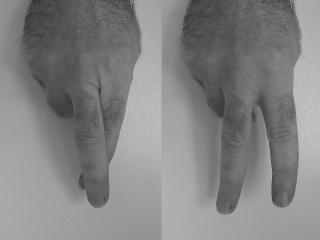
ㅆ ss

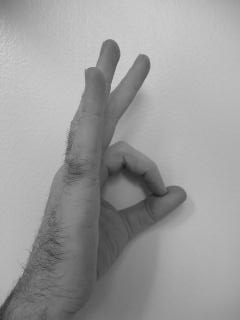
ㅇ ng

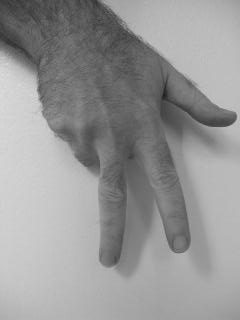
ㅈ j

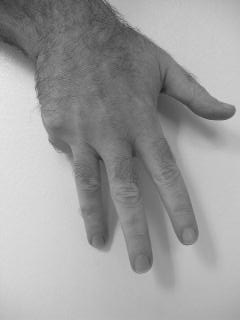
ㅊ ch

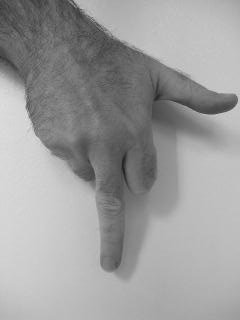
ㅋ k

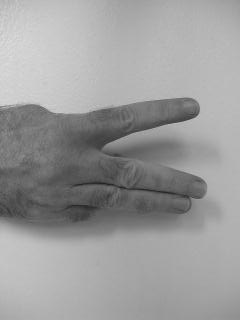
ㅌ t

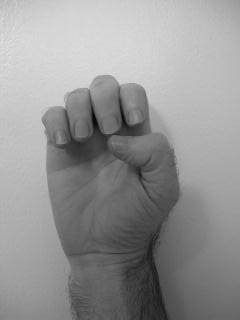
ㅍ p

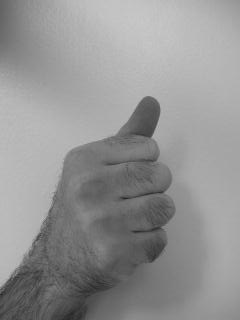
ㅎ h

=== Vowels ===
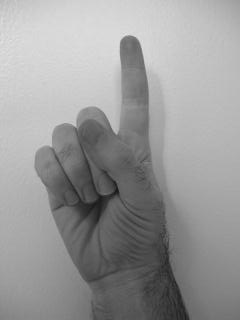
ㅏ a

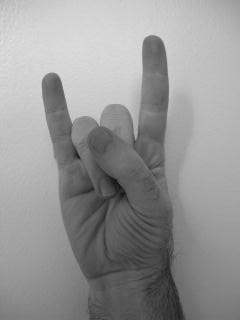
ㅐ ae

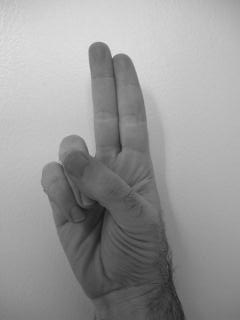
ㅑ ya

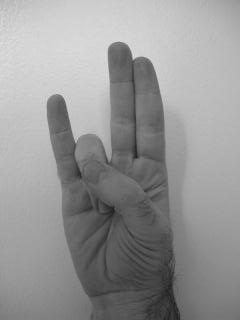
ㅒ yae

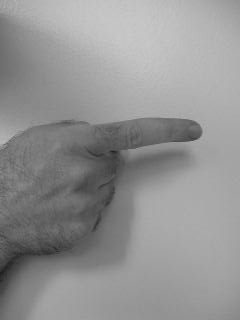
ㅓ eo

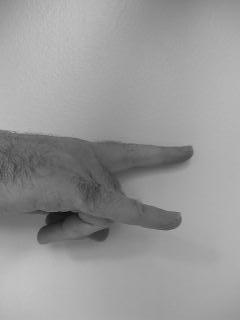
ㅔ e

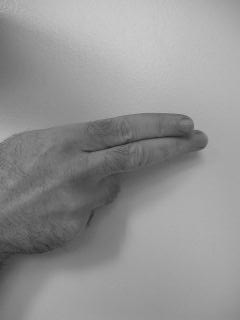
ㅕ yeo

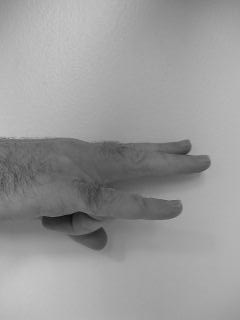
ㅖ ye

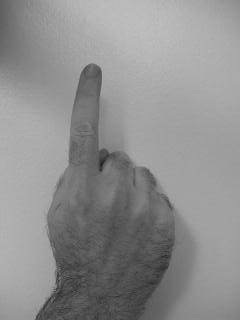
ㅗ o

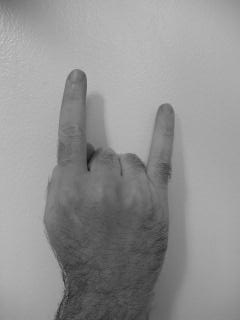
ㅚ oe

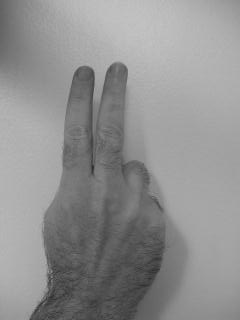
ㅛ yo

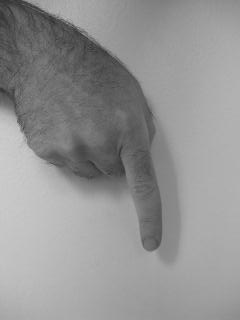
ㅜ u

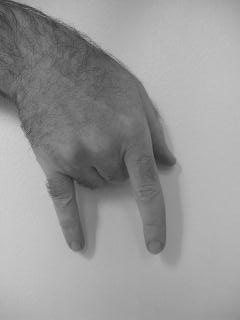
ㅟ wi

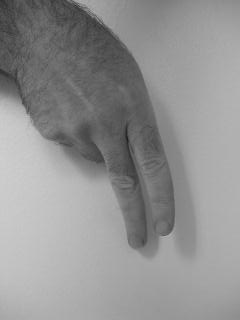
ㅠ yu

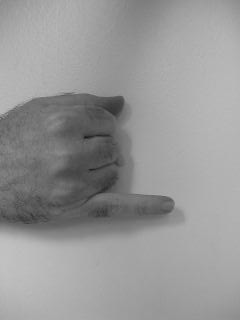
ㅡ eu

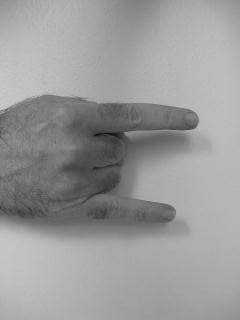
ㅢ ui

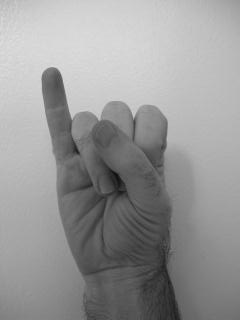
ㅣ i

Note that the difference in orientation between eo, yeo and the diphthongs based on them, e, ye is not significant.

== See also ==
- North Korean Sign Language
- Deafness in South Korea
- Disability in South Korea
- Japanese Sign Language Family
