= Rochester School for the Deaf =

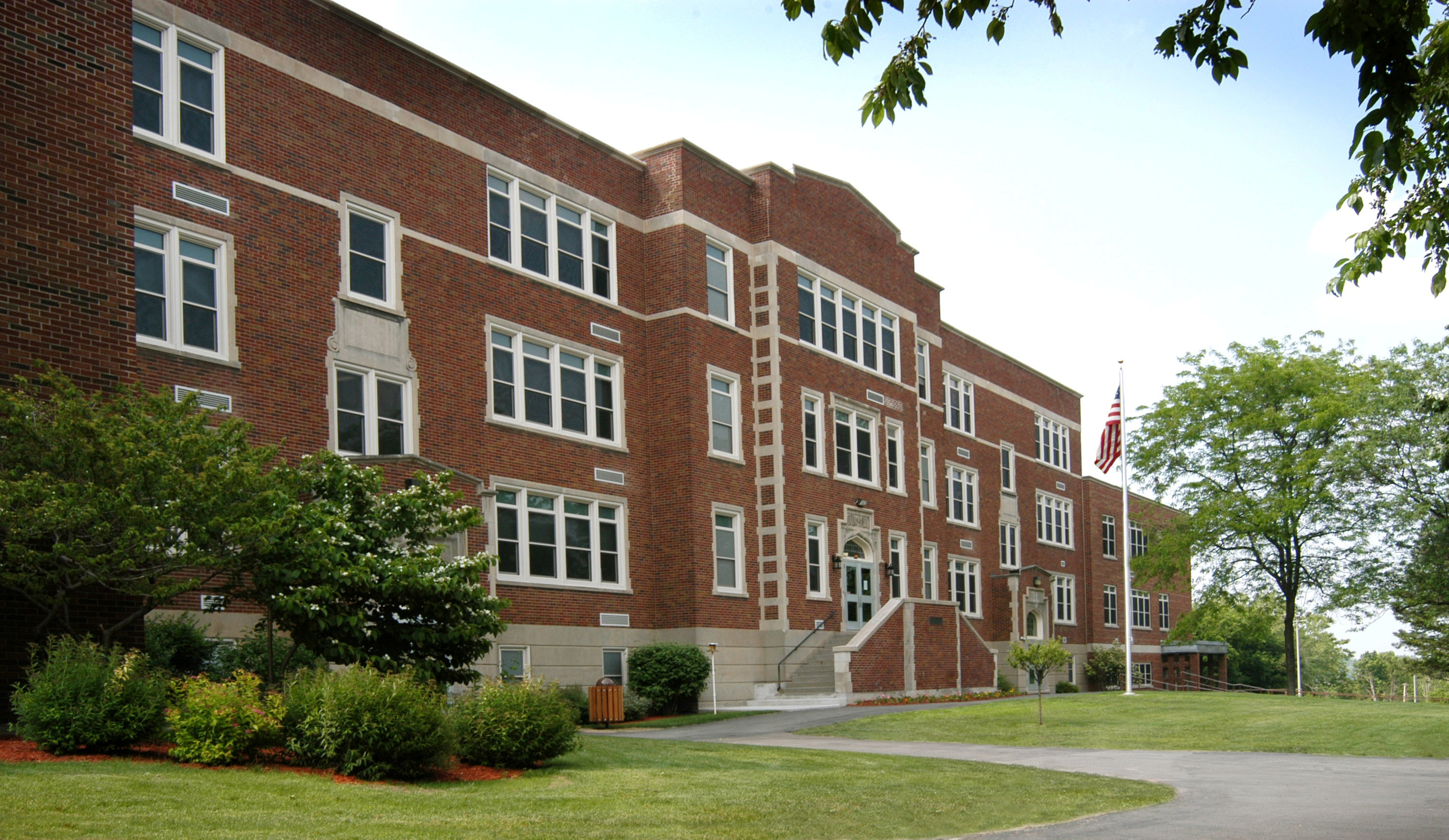
- Westervelt Hall at RSD

Location
- 1545 St. Paul Street; Rochester, New York, 14621
- 43°11′4″N 77°37′31″W

Information
- Type: Private; Tuition-free
- Established: 1876
- Head of school: Mr. Antony A.L. McLetchie
- Grades: preK-12
- Enrollment: 135
- Colors: Navy blue and Orange
- Athletics: ESDAA
- Mascot: Wildcat
- Website: http://www.rsdeaf.org

Rochester School for the Deaf (RSD) is a private, tuition-free school for deaf and hard of hearing students to attend in Rochester, New York. It is one of the oldest and most respected preK-12th grade schools for children with hearing loss and their families in the United States, and one of nine such schools in the state of New York. Serving the Central and Western portions of New York State, it has been educating students since 1876.

Rochester School for the Deaf is an inclusive, bilingual school (Communication Philosophy) where deaf and hard of hearing children and their families thrive in an extraordinarily rich educational environment.

The school's approach includes:

- New York State Regents-level educational programs;
- Direct communication through American Sign Language and English;
- Highly skilled teaching and support staff professionals;
- Inclusive, barrier-free approach to teaching and learning activities; and
- Support to students and their families through a wide array of accessible services.

The intake evaluation process for deaf and hard of hearing children to attend RSD follows New York State Education Department procedures. Families in New York State with deaf and hard of hearing children – newborn to age 18 – can apply to RSD directly at any time. Parents of deaf and hard of hearing infants, toddlers and twos (children up to age 3) may request a referral to RSD from their county's Early Intervention program. Families with children age 3 to 5 can request a referral to RSD from their home school district's Committee on Preschool Special Education (CPSE). Families with children age 5 to 18 can request a referral to RSD from their school district's Committee on Special Education (CSE).

RSD support service staff conducts comprehensive intake evaluations. This service is free-of-charge and includes:

- Educational and Classroom Observation
- Psychological Assessment
- Speech/Language Assessment
- Audiological Assessment
- Social History Review
- Medical History Review
- Vocational Assessment

Rochester School for the Deaf is one of eleven Section 4201 schools created by legislation to educate New York State's deaf, blind and severely physically disabled students. Each school has its own board of directors and receives financial support for operations and programming directly from the New York State Department of Education. These eleven schools form the 4201 Schools Association of New York State. The mission of the Association is to enhance the future of New York's children and advocate for the continuation of specialized services.

== History ==
The Rochester School for the Deaf was founded in 1876 by Mr. and Mrs. Gilman H. Perkins. Thomas Hopkins Gallaudet was a member of the Board of Directors, among other members.
