= Koniya Sign Language =

Sign languages of Amami Oshima, Japan

Koniya Sign
- Amami Ōshima Sign
- Native to: Japan
- Region: Amami Ōshima
- Native speakers: 4 (2020)
- Language family: village sign

Language codes
- ISO 639-3: jks
- Glottolog: amam1247

Koniya Sign (Japanese: 古仁屋手話, romanized: Koniya Shuwa), or Amami Ōshima Sign (AOSL; 奄美大島手話, Amamiōshima Shuwa) is a village sign language, or group of languages, on Amami Ōshima, the largest island in the Amami Islands of Japan. In the region of Koniya on the island, there exist a high incidence of congenital deafness, which is dominant and tends to run in a few families; moreover, the difficulty of the terrain has kept these families largely separated, so that there is extreme lexical geographical diversity across the island, and AOSL is therefore perhaps not a single language.

== See also ==
- Ted Supalla
- Japanese Sign Language
- Miyakubo Sign Language

== Bibliography ==
- Osugi, Yutaka; Supalla, Ted; Webb, Rebecca (1999). "The use of word elicitation to identify distinctive gestural systems on Amami Island". Sign Language & Linguistics. 2 (1): 87–112. doi:10.1075/sll.2.1.12osu.
