= Signed Japanese =

Signed form of spoken Japanese

Japanese Equivalent Sign Language or Signed Japanese is a signed language that corresponds to Japanese. With this signed language, one can express Japanese correctly, and this signed language is useful to Japanese learners. Having a richer vocabulary than past signed languages can help increase communicative effectiveness in places of learning, public institutions, and public places. This signed language is not to be confused with Japanese Sign Language or JSL.

== Definition ==
Japanese Equivalent Sign Language involves speaking Japanese aloud (or by simply mouthing words in Japanese) and replacing some of the words with signed words from Japanese Equivalent Sign Language to match the Japanese that one is speaking (or mouthing).

Signed Japanese borrows words from Japanese Sign Language and expresses them using the grammatical structure of Japanese. Signed Japanese is also called Manual Japanese and is thought to be a form of Japanese.

In the same way that braille expresses Japanese through the mode of dots, Signed Japanese expresses Japanese through the mode of hands and fingers.

Suemori (2017) argues that the "Sign Language" in Japanese Sign Language refers to sign language in the narrow sense as an individual language, and that the "Sign Language" in Japanese Equivalent Sign Language refers to sign language in a broader sense, meaning a way of communication through the use of hands and fingers. Suemori points out that because of the ambiguity of the term "Sign Language", the debate between Japanese Sign Language and Japanese Equivalent Sign Language has "become unproductive (p. 260)".

== State of usage ==
Signed Japanese is mainly used by Japanese people who have hearing loss and Japanese people who have lost their hearing later in life. Sign language learners who can hear and teachers at public schools for the deaf in Japan often use Japanese equivalent sign language.

Most of the sign language used in so-called "sign language speech contests" and the majority of sign language used by hearing people expressing sign language words along with music sung in Japanese is Signed Japanese.

NHK TV's "One-point Sign Language for People Who Have Lost Their Hearing or are Hard of Hearing" uses Signed Japanese. Incidentally, the same broadcasting station's "NHK's Sign Language for Everyone" has been completely revised since 2006 to focus primarily on Japanese Sign Language.

Studies from the United States and Japan have shown that even deaf people whose first language is a sign language, such as Japanese Sign Language or American Sign Language, code switch between using Japanese Sign Language or a mixed sign language depending on the situation and the person they are talking to.

Code-switching from Japanese Sign Language to Manual Japanese (Signed Japanese) is most likely to occur in public settings, such as sign language classes and ceremonies, but many speakers code-switch as soon as they realize that the other person is able to hear.

A sign language that mixes the expressions and grammar of Japanese Sign Language and Signed Japanese (Manual Japanese) is called a hybrid sign language, and the degree of mixing varies greatly between people who use it.

== Social positioning and controversy ==
In the 1990s, Japanese Equivalent Sign Language was thought to be the "correct" sign language. It was socially superior to Japanese Sign Language and was considered to be the language "used by intelligent people" because of its closeness to the Japanese language. Those people who were skilled at oral communication and could use both sign language and spoken language were seen as talented and had high status.

However, in a piece titled "Deaf Culture Declaration'' was published in 1995, by Harumi Kimura and Yasuhiro Ichida, in Contemporary Philosophy, deaf people are harshly criticized. Kimura and Ichida claimed that deaf people's method of "arranging sign language words while speaking the spoken language'' was an "impossible'' and "half-baked'' communication method that "tries to speak two languages at the same time". On page 8 of "Deaf Culture Declaration'', They defined deaf people as a "linguistic minority who speak Japanese Sign Language, a language different from Japanese". After writing all of this, they discussed the importance of bilingual education in Japanese Sign Language and written Japanese.
