= Miyakubo Sign Language =

Sign language from a Japanese village

Miyakubo Sign
- Ehime-Oshima Sign
- Native to: Japan
- Region: Miyakubo, Ōshima, Ehime Prefecture
- Native speakers: 70 (L1+L2) (2020)
- Language family: village sign

Language codes
- ISO 639-3: ehs
- Glottolog: miya1268

Miyakubo Sign Language (Japanese: 宮窪手話, romanized: Miyakubo Shuwa) also known as Ehime-Oshima Sign Language, is a village sign language of Ōshima Island in the western Inland Sea of Japan. In the town of Miyakubo on the island, there exist a high incidence of congenital deafness. Three families are predominantly deaf, with 20 living deaf members (as of 2018), and in one of them all family members are deaf and have been for at least three generations. These form the core of speakers of the language, though there are deaf members of other families who speak it as well. There are also about 50 hearing neighbors and coworkers of the deaf (especially in the fishing industry) who know the language. A number of hearing children pick it up from deaf classmates in preschool. Because Signed Japanese rather than Japanese Sign Language (JSL) long dominated in education for the deaf in Japan, Miyakubo Sign was protected from the influence of JSL until the early 2000s. The opening of the Nishiseto Expressway in 1999 also opened the community to greater external influence and decreased the level of interaction between the deaf and hearing. Currently the younger generations (born since the 1980s) are bilingual, but use Miyakubo Sign exclusively with older people, who find JSL unintelligible. Among themselves, they may mix Miyakubo Sign and JSL or use JSL exclusively.
