= Deafness in Thailand =

Deafness in Thailand refers to the population and culture of Deaf and Hard of Hearing people in Thailand. Deafness in Thailand includes language emergence, organizations, healthcare, employment, schooling, and civil rights.

== Language emergence ==
Deaf and hard of hearing people in Thailand use Thai Sign Language (TSL) or Modern Thai Sign Language (MTSL). TSL was officially labeled "the national language of deaf people in Thailand" in 1999. TSL is related to American Sign Language (ASL) and belongs to the same language family as ASL because of American-trained educators in Thailand in the 1950s. Indigenous sign languages still exist in Thailand, but aren't as widely used. Old Bangkok Sign Language and Changmai Sign Language were used more in the 1950s, but are mostly used now by older deaf generations. Bangkok has the highest concentration of deaf people with Changmai following in second.

Not much is known about the origins of TSL or MTSL, but it is known that TSL is used mostly by Thai signers under the age of 40 and signers who live in more urban areas of Thailand. TSL is the language used for the National Association of the Deaf in Thailand and other significant deaf organizations in Thailand.

Ban Khor Sign Language is another indigenous sign language in Thailand, but in 2009, there were only 400 known native speakers. Ban Khor is a village sign language that was used in northeastern Thailand. It is a language isolate, which is a language that cannot be categorized into a larger language family.

Ban Khor is a village in Thailand in the northeastern region of Thailand. In the early 20th century, there were no deaf people in Ban Khor, so sign language did not exist there. In the early 1930s, the deaf population in Ban Khor grew due to hereditary deafness in the population. BKSL began as a deaf community sign language but soon developed into a shared sign language. There is no way to know exactly how BKSL developed into a shared sign language, but in an interview, Mr. Doot, the oldest brother of his deaf family, says his siblings invented a type of sign because they couldn't speak. Overtime, it became a community sign language and later, shared sign.

Some prominent people in Thai language emergence are Kamala Kraireuk and Maliwan Tammasaeng. Kamala Kraireuk invented fingerspelling in 1953 and earned her master's degree in Deaf studies. Maliwan Tammasaeng was the former director of the School for the Deaf and a board member on the Foundation for the Deaf.

== Significant organizations ==
The National Association of the Deaf in Thailand works to provide deaf and hard of hearing people in Thailand with the services they may need. The association was founded by alumni from the Setthasatien School, which is a school for deaf and hard of hearing people. The foundation provides sign language interpretation services, deaf guide services, closed captioning services, and complaint services. Some of their objectives include: to ensure and strengthen deaf association establishment in every province in Thailand, to promote public health and human right, sports and recreation welfare, and necessary accommodation for deaf and hard of hearing people, and to promote and preserve education rights and to provide and support related careers and skills for deaf.

The Nippon Foundation works to achieve social innovation in several countries across the world. About 20 years ago, the Nippon Foundation opened their services to the deaf population. The Nippon Foundation works to help deaf and hard of hearing people make their own decisions and ensure that they get equal participation opportunities in society. This foundation services many countries, including Thailand.

The International Week of the Deaf occurs every year in September and Thailand joined in 2018, where they held an event for people with disabilities to increase public awareness. The event was held by the National Association of the Deaf in Thailand and the theme in 2018 was With Sign Language, Everyone is Included! This theme emphasized the importance of learning sign language and the importance of communication within deaf and hard of hearing communities.

The Thai Department for the Empowerment of Persons with Disabilities believes in improving the lives of individuals with disabilities and giving them the resources needed. Their initiative is based on educating the general public on sign language, empowering other organizations related to deaf services, finding good financial access, making sure disabled people have access to job opportunities, and finding activities that will benefit deaf and hard of hearing people.

The Thai Telecommunication Relay Service installed kiosks around Thailand in cooperation with the Universal Foundation for Persons with Disabilities. There were two types of kiosks set up, the first would allow for deaf and hard of hearing people to talk with hearing people and the second would allow hearing people to communicate with deaf and hard of hearing people. This communication was achieved through sign language interpreters. These are free of charge and easily accessible with cameras, keyboards, and headphones.

DeafThai is a foundation for the deaf established for the needs of deaf and hard of hearing people. The establishment of DeafThai eventually led to the establishment of the deaf education unit at Somanas Temple.

Wycliffe Bible Translators is a group of people that work to translate the Bible to hundreds of languages across the world. In Thailand, deaf Bible translators are working to translate the Bible into Thai Sign Language.

== Human and civil rights ==
Thailand's government provides governmental documents in TSL, while many other countries do not. This makes it easier for deaf and hard of hearing people to communicate with their government officials.

Thailand states that their government does not consider deaf people to have the right to employment and earn the same salary as other hearing individuals, though there is an anti-discrimination law for employment in Thailand.

Over 2 million people have disability cards in Thailand, and 18% of these disabled people are hearing impaired. In 2007, the Thai government passed the Persons with Disabilities Empowerment Act. This act states, "anyone who encounters limitations through an impairment has the right to receive legal or personal assistance, sign language interpreters, medical services, house modifications for better accessibility and education free of charge. They can also receive tax exemptions, cheaper public transportation feeds, loans without interest for self-employment and a monthly allowance of 800 baht."

Other organizations in Thailand have also worked to provide better human rights to deaf and hard of hearing people. For example, the National Association of the Deaf in Thailand worked to get Thailand to recognize TSL as an official language in 1999.

== Primary and secondary education ==
The first educational program for Deaf or Hard of Hearing individuals in Thailand was established in 1951 as an experiment. Twelve DHH students were taught at a public school in Bangkok to see how well they could learn with hearing students. This experiment led to the establishment of the first DHH school in Thailand called Setsatian School for the Deaf. The first two directors of this school were trained in the United States at Gallaudet University in Washington, DC. The Setsatian School is an elementary and middle school located in Bangkok, Thailand. The teachers lead instruction primarily in Thai Sign Language (TSL), with limited spoken word. The classes have about 15-20 students in each of them, with some students wearing hearing aids and other students not.

The Sotpattana School for the Deaf is also located in Bangkok, Thailand and was established in 1982. This school is for Deaf or Hard of Hearing students aged three to nine years old. It is a private charity school affiliated with the Office of the Private Education Commission and the Ministry of Education of Thailand. The school takes both day students and boarding students, as they have residential dorms above the classrooms. The principles of Sotpattana School are love, kindness, and self-development.

More programs for DHH students have been established throughout Thailand, but only about 30,000 out of 280,000 Deaf individuals in Thailand are provided with education services/programs, which is about 11%. There are 20 residential schools for DHH students in Thailand, they are established in 19 provinces out of Thailand's total of 77 provinces.

== Employment ==
Employment for deaf or hard of hearing individuals in Thailand is limited, as there is a lack of interpreters for them. If there are no interpreters at the job, the DHH employees will not be able to participate in the same ways that hearing people would be. For example, if there is a meeting with important information, but there is no interpreter, it would be hard for the DHH employee to get the same information or even the same quality of information.

Because there aren't that many schools for the Deaf in Thailand, it is hard to get a degree in order to get a job for DHH individuals. Even if DHH people can get a degree, employers prefer to hire hearing people. Also, most schools for the Deaf are in major cities in Thailand, like Bangkok and Chang Mai, meaning only a small fraction of the Thai deaf population is getting an education in order to get a job.

One major place of work for DHH people in Thailand is a very large KFC. This KFC is located inside Times Square in Bangkok, a place crowded with tourists. This is the first KFC in Thailand that largely employs hearing impaired individuals, making up about 70% of the employees. All hearing and hearing impaired staff are trained the same and use sign language. There are different colored lights that signify different things, like alarms and announcements.

Another place of work in Thailand for DHH people is a coffee shop located in Bangkok. This coffee shop employs DHH people and makes it easier for them to communicate with customers. There are signs for customers to point to which drinks they want and the employers are very open minded. The goal of the coffee shop is to employ DHH people who may have had trouble getting jobs in the past.

== Healthcare ==
Thailand is still behind other countries in early hearing detection and screenings, but it is possible to get tests done. Hearing screening tests are not done in the hospital when the baby is born, but can be scheduled afterwards at the parents' request. Hearing screening tests seem to only be available in Bangkok and Chiang Mai, the biggest cities in Thailand.

Cochlear implants are available in Thailand at a lower cost than in the United States, but can still be very expensive and hard to obtain. Most people with hearing impairments in Thailand use hearing aids.

Before 1989, people who were visually or hearing impaired in Thailand were not recognized in any of Thailand's educational or rehabilitation systems. In 1989, the Hiltons-Perkins program, which provides aid all over the world to those with disabilities, came to Thailand and helped provide education and healthcare for those who were hearing impaired.
