= Deafness in the Windward Islands =

The Windward Islands are a group of islands in the Caribbean Sea that include Dominica, Martinique, Barbados, Saint Lucia, Saint Vincent and the Grenadines, Trinidad and Tobago, and Grenada. A variety of cultures, beliefs, languages, and views of deafness exist on the islands.

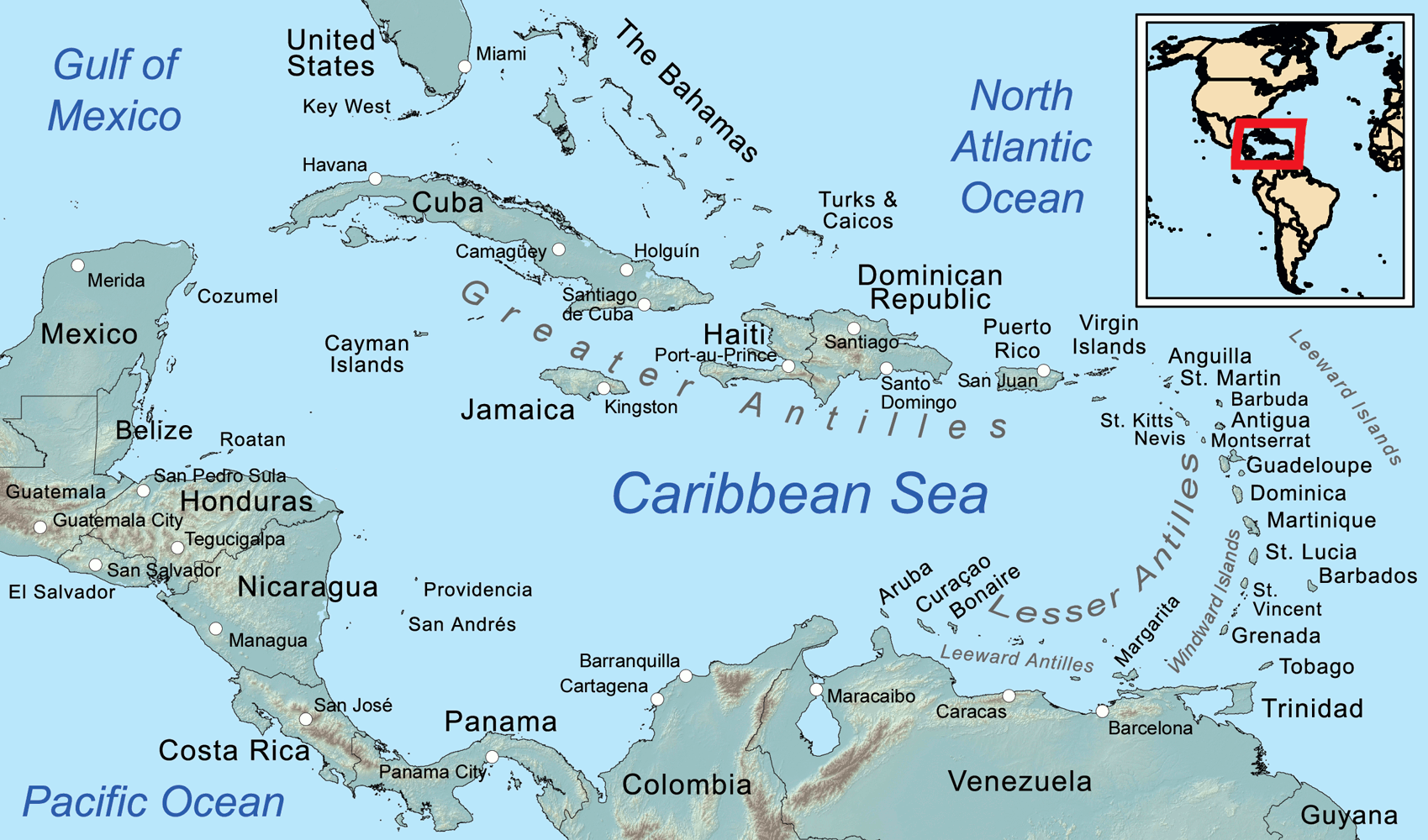
The Windward Islands are on the map's lower right, above and to the right of Venezuela

Since the 16th and 17th centuries, the Windward Islands have developed various languages that consist of many official and unofficial languages, the latter of which are usually Indigenous languages. Many people on the Windward Islands speak Creole languages. The Windward Islands have various Indigenous or Creole-signed languages following the variety of spoken languages. Creole languages typically derive from multiple sources and combine elements of different languages. Creole is derived from Pidgin, a simplified form of speech used by individuals that do not share a common language.

There are two main types of signed language in the Windward Islands. In communities with high rates of congenital deafness, there are rural or village sign languages. Both deaf and hearing people communicate using these languages, which can be called rural sign languages, shared languages, or micro-community sign languages.

The second type, deaf community sign languages, are sign languages shared by a larger community. These languages typically form with the creation of schools for the deaf, which bring together deaf children from many different areas.

Due to the lack of educational resources in the Windward Islands, many deaf individuals have communication delays. Some create their own forms of communication, leading to the invention of various sign languages in the Windward Islands that have not yet been identified by linguists.

== Sign languages ==
=== Barbados ===
In Barbados, deaf and hard-of-hearing individuals use American Sign Language (ASL) combined with signs that represent the Bajan language and culture. Many deaf people also use village sign languages.

=== Dominica ===
In Dominica, American Sign Language (ASL) is the most common sign language. The other sign languages are either unknown or unofficial. As of 2011, an estimated 75 to 320 deaf people lived in Dominica.

=== Grenada ===
Grenada's first school for the deaf was built in 1969. One of the first teachers was a Canadian woman who introduced ASL to the island. After she left, other educators continued to teach the students ASL.

Deaf people over the age of 40 are reported to use only home signs and gestures. Many deaf and hard-of-hearing individuals under the age of 40 know and use ASL because of the deaf schools. Before the introduction of ASL, there were no indigenous Grenadian sign languages.

=== Martinique ===
As of 2011, researchers estimated that between 400 and 3,200 deaf people lived in Martinique. Martinique is a French territory, and the official language is French. The primary sign language in Martinique is French Sign Language (LSF). According to the Society for Caribbean Linguistics (SCL), Martinique does not have a deaf school, meaning many individuals had to go to school in France and come back to work. However, deaf Martinicans did not like this arrangement because the cultures of France and Martinique are very different. As of the 2020s, Martinican deaf individuals are working together to incorporate their culture into the sign languages they use.

=== Saint Lucia ===
The most common sign language in Saint Lucia is American Sign Language (ASL). Others are either unofficial or unknown to linguists.

=== Saint Vincent and the Grenadines ===
In Saint Vincent and the Grenadines, many rural deaf populations have their own localized sign languages. In this area of the Windward Islands, the most commonly used sign languages are ASL and Signing Exact English (SEE-II). In addition, deaf or hard-of-hearing individuals over the age of 35 in Saint Vincent do not use sign language because sign language was only recently introduced in the area. Many deaf people rely on home signs to communicate, and older deaf individuals do not communicate or interact with other deaf people. These individuals typically live in isolated rural areas. They often lack access to deaf education or a developed sign language. According to SIL International, an evangelical non-profit organization, "Although deaf people indicated that there may be a few local signs and facial expressions confined to Saint Vincent, they all indicated that they have grown up using 'Sign America' that they learned at school and that there is no 'Saint Vincent Sign Language.' "

=== Trinidad and Tobago ===
Deaf people in Trinidad and Tobago use Trinidad and Tobago Sign Language (TTSL), which is the region's indigenous sign language. This language emerged around 1943 when the first deaf school in the region opened, called the Cascade School for the Deaf. 21st-century schools for the deaf teach American Sign Language (ASL) instead, so many deaf people of the younger generation do not use TTSL very often. When deaf Trinidadians and Tobagonians communicate at deaf associations, they typically mix TTSL with ASL.

== Local deaf organizations ==
Many nonprofit organizations, such as The Starkey Hearing Foundation, the Trinidad and Tobago Association for the Hearing Impaired, SIL International, Joshua Project, Caribbean Deaf News, and the Barbados Association for the Blind and Deaf provide services to deaf and hard of hearing individuals in the Windward Islands.

Caribbean Deaf News uploads interviews with deaf Caribbeans, information about current events, and weather warnings to social media sites. The organization is active on Facebook, YouTube, and Instagram. They have also worked with Barbados' Department of Emergency Management (DEM) to train first responders in sign language so they can assist deaf individuals during emergency situations, such as a hurricane.

SIL International is an evangelical Christian nonprofit whose goal is to research and document languages around the world. One of their main goals is to translate the Christian Bible into as many languages as possible so they can proselytize to Indigenous people and speakers of minority languages worldwide. They have published reports on deaf communities in the Windward Islands.

=== Barbados ===
The Barbados Association for the Blind and Deaf is a registered charity association established by an act of Parliament in 1957. It founded Barbados' first school for the deaf shortly after. The school later changed its name to the Irving Wilson School for the Blind and Deaf. This school was the only educational institution for deaf students in Barbados as of 2011. The Barbados Council for Disabilities works with disabled Barbadians, including deaf people. They provide sign language interpretation and information on deafness.

=== Dominica ===
The Dominica Association of Disabled Persons (DADP) was established in 1983. It provides sign language and communication training. It also helps deaf youth find employment and prepare for living on their own. The association is funded by grants, donations, fundraisers, and government subsidies. DADP has over 400 members.

=== Martinique ===
Multiple organizations in Martinique provide services to deaf individuals and their families. AMEIS, or L'Association Martiniquaise pour l’Education et l’Insertion des Sourds, was founded by parents of deaf children. AMEIS provides education in French Sign Language (LSF) and trains deaf people for future employment.

Surdus Antilles, based in Fort-de-France, offers educational courses in LSF for both the general public and for interpreters. They also provide certificates for interpreters of LSF.

=== Saint Vincent and the Grenadines ===
SIL International has found that Saint Vincent lacks deaf organizations, although some deaf people attend informal meetings at religious institutions.

The Starkey Hearing Foundation, a nonprofit based in the United States, has worked in Grenada. Their aim is to provide hearing aids to deaf people worldwide. They held a mission to Grenada in 2019 to provide hearing aids to deaf Grenadians. The Starkey Hearing Foundation also partnered with local organizations and ministries so more deaf Grenadians would be aware of the services they provide.

=== Trinidad and Tobago ===
The Trinidad and Tobago Association for the Hearing Impaired (TTAHI) is a nonprofit founded in 1943. TTAHI provides sign language instruction and interpretation to deaf individuals, their families, schools, and first responders. They also provide occupational therapy and employment assistance to deaf people.

== Civil rights ==
Multiple countries in the Windward Islands signed the Convention on the Rights of Persons with Disabilities (CRPD), a United Nations Human Rights Treaty. Dominica signed in 2007, Grenada signed in 2010, and Saint Lucia signed in 2011. Saint Vincent and the Grenadines, Dominica, Barbados, Grenada, Trinidad and Tobago, and Saint Lucia went on to ratify the CRPD. Saint Vincent and the Grenadines, Saint Lucia, and Dominica also ratified the optional protocol to the CRPD.

However, disabled people across the Windward Islands still experience marginalization. Employment rates for deaf people are low in Trinidad and Tobago and Grenada. Those who have jobs are typically employed in blue-collar work and have difficulty breaking into other fields. Additionally, deaf people report receiving less pay than their hearing coworkers.

Deaf children have limited access to education and public school. In addition, few deaf people enter higher education, academia, or professional fields. Many deaf people lack a formal education because their parents keep them home to help with housework.

== Early hearing detection ==
Very few licensed pediatric audiologists practice in the Windward Island region. Those that do can perform hearing screenings and provide referrals to speech therapists. Additionally, pediatric audiologists can fit children for hearing aids or cochlear implants.

=== Early hearing detection and screening ===
Early hearing detection and intervention (EHDI) is a program that helps to ensure that newborns, infants, and young children who are hard of hearing or deaf are diagnosed early to receive the care they need in the future. EHDI is not universally implemented in the Windward Islands. Due to cost and the high rate of congenital hearing loss, few young children go through hearing screenings in the overall Caribbean region. According to a 2020 study by the Journal of Early Hearing Detection and Intervention, Grenada, Dominica, Saint Lucia, Saint Vincent and the Grenadines either lacked early hearing screenings or had little data to report.

==== Trinidad and Tobago ====
The Language Education Policy of Trinidad and Tobago stated that there has never been sufficient information on deafness and deaf education to form a basis for public policy in the country. According to the Speech, Language, and Audiology Association of Trinidad and Tobago, no comprehensive audiology services are available in the public health sector. Very few audiologists practice on the islands. However, parents can send their children for a hearing evaluation to detect hearing loss. If the audiologist discovers hearing loss, they will counsel the family on how the condition will influence the child's communication, social skills, literacy, and academics. They may also recommend hearing technology or provide a referral to a speech therapist.

=== Hearing technology ===
Few deaf children in the Windward Islands, and in the Caribbean overall, receive cochlear implants, hearing aids, or other technology or resources that they might need. In fact, the World Health Organization indicates that over 5% of the world's population has disabling hearing loss, and Latin America and the Caribbean account for 9% of the global burden of disabling hearing loss. However, some organizations, such as the Starkey Foundation, provide hearing technology. Although children and parents may have access to organizations that will provide them with hearing technology, many experience issues with using and repairing the technology.

== Language deprivation ==
Language deprivation, or the lack of exposure to language at a young age, prevents many deaf children from fully obtaining the skills that are required to succeed in society and school environments. Although any child can experience language deprivation, deaf children are especially at risk because they cannot process spoken language as hearing children do. There is a lack of data and information on early language learning in the Windward Islands, so researchers are unable to declare if language deprivation exists. According to the Bernard van Leer Foundation, whose purpose is to study early childhood development, the region has "little monitoring of what happens at the country’s preschool centers. The stress tends to be on custodial care or on subjects that might give a child a head start in mainstream schooling. Research in both countries has shown that softer skills such as communication, creativity, and language are rarely stressed in pre-school provision." However, little research has been done into deaf education in the Windward Islands. Although the lack of data makes it difficult to declare if language deprivation exists in the Windward Islands, some researchers have assumed that language deprivation exists precisely because of the lack of research.

Many deaf adults in the islands feel that more effort and work needs to be done to make sure that deaf children have early access to signed language. A deaf teaching assistant in Trinidad and Tobago described a student teacher who said that he only started school at age twelve. Before that, he had no access to a sign language model. The student arrived at the deaf school with a delay in communication skills, and he had to be taught the basics of sign language from scratch.

Lack of sign language exposure, and the resulting communication delay, is common in the Windward Islands. Deaf children have few opportunities and lack support in their region. On the islands, ministries and non-governmental organizations may help those in need; however, many deaf children are not able to attend school due to the lack of interpreters, educators, and other necessary resources. In addition, there are very few places to access hearing technologies, and deaf people need to travel great distances to receive them or to have them repaired. Many deaf individuals say that it is easier not to have cochlear implants or hearing technologies due to the cost, time, and inconvenience. Few deaf individuals have proper access to education and communication resources.

== Primary and secondary education ==
Compared to other regions in the world, there is very little research on deaf education in the Windward Islands. The region has struggled to implement equal access to primary and secondary education for deaf children. The Windward Islands lack deaf professionals and academics to contribute to the development of deaf education.

=== Trinidad and Tobago ===
Deaf education is understudied in Trinidad and Tobago. The government's Language and Language Education Policy comments that "at no time in the history of education in the country has there been sufficient information of deafness and deaf education." In 1931, the census counted 1,126 deaf people on the islands; 74 of whom were also mute. However, a school for the deaf did not open until 1943. In 1943, F. W. Gilby, an Englishman, founded the Cascade School for the Deaf. Attendance grew over the years; the school was rebuilt in 1953 to accommodate more students.

Trinidad and Tobago has no deaf preschools or high schools. According to Deafness and Education International, only three schools for the deaf exist on Trinidad and Tobago: Cascade School for the Deaf, the Tobago School for the Deaf, Speech, and Language Impaired, and Audrey Jeffers' School for the Deaf. All are primary schools. According to an ethnographic study from Trinidad and Tobago, "in the Caribbean, there has been a failure of the education system to prepare deaf students for successful entry into higher education and the number of deaf professionals and academics remains low." Approximately 5% of deaf children in the country have deaf parents, who are more likely than hearing parents to sign and expose them to language at an early age. However, most deaf Trinidadians and Tobagonians have hearing parents and have no access to a native signing model. Due to this delay in communication, deaf Trinidadians and Tobagonians suffer educational delays. Most deaf students do not learn sign language until primary school.

A 2021 study investigated the impact of e-learning during the COVID-19 pandemic on deaf primary and secondary students in Trinidad and Tobago. This study observed course materials and communication between deaf students, their teachers, their interpreters, and their parents. The study showed that many deaf students in both primary and secondary school encountered communication barriers. These barriers, such as lack of Internet access or poor Internet access, led to multiple issues. These educational barriers have prevented deaf students in primary and secondary schools from accessing education and have led to learning delays.

Since the 1980s, some deaf students have been mainstreamed into regular schools. According to The Caribbean Educational Research Journal, many deaf students who were mainstreamed report that they felt isolated because of a lack of deaf peers. Many stated that they would rather attend a special secondary school for deaf students.

=== Barbados ===
In Barbados, many deaf students achieve very low levels of education in secondary schools because they enter secondary school with inadequate numeracy and literacy skills.

The prevalence of speech and hearing problems in public primary schools in Barbados appears to be higher than in other nearby countries. One in four children in Barbados has either speech or hearing difficulties, causing many deaf Barbadians to perform poorly or not succeed in secondary schools.

The Irving Wilson School for the Blind and Deaf is currently the only educational institution for deaf students in Barbados, although eight other primary schools around the country also offer special education classes which deaf students may attend. The school serves students ages 5–18 years old and incorporates American Sign Language (ASL), Braille, and large print text in the academic program.

== Higher education ==
Many deaf individuals in the Windward Islands do not have the opportunity to enter higher education. Some parents keep deaf children at home to help with domestic work. In other cases, the family may not be able to afford education for their child. Many deaf people in the Windward Islands do not have the necessary primary education to progress to higher levels. Many wish to progress to higher education but are either unable to do so.

=== Grenada ===
There are only two schools in the country for deaf students. Because of this, many deaf people in Grenada cannot obtain higher education there, so they attempt to gain higher education in the United States. However, it is rare for a deaf individual to pass a high school entrance exam. According to SIL, individuals passing the entrance exam are allowed to attend high school or further education.

== Employment ==
Many deaf individuals in the Windward Islands work from home, sew, work in factories, or obtain other jobs that do not require higher education. Although they may work with hearing people, they often receive less than hearing people for the same work. Many deaf workers fear losing their jobs if they complain.

=== Barbados ===
Unemployment is a serious issue for deaf people in Barbados. The president of a New Life Deaf Fellowship said, "presently, these people still find it difficult to gain meaningful employment and, when they do, they are often paid less than other workers. Some employers even deny them the right to be employed on seeing their application forms, only because of their disability."

=== Grenada ===
Deaf individuals in Grenada generally work in factories or at family businesses. They may have technology-related jobs, sew, or clean. Deaf individuals state that the pay is not equivalent to the pay for hearing people, but that they do not have the education needed for a better-paying job.

=== Saint Vincent ===
Saint Vincent contains a very small deaf population and every known deaf individual in Saint Vincent has a job. However, these jobs are not high-paying because the workers lack higher education.

=== Saint Lucia ===
Deaf children in Saint Lucia confront educational barriers, which affect their employment rates in adulthood. There are very few employment opportunities for adults.

=== Trinidad and Tobago ===
According to SIL International, employment rates for deaf people in Trinidad and Tobago are low. Many deaf and hard of hearing individuals say that they did not receive adequate education to obtain jobs. Many are limited to the skills they have learned through vocational training. Such work involves carpentry, cleaning houses, fixing furniture, cooking, factory work, and other blue-collar work. Very few deaf individuals in Trinidad and Tobago work in an office or educational context, and most state that they can't find any type of steady employment. Many participants of a deaf questionnaire indicate that they view a better education as the main way to find better work and gain independence.

== Healthcare ==
The Windward Islands has various health and emergency medical services, such as the Windward Islands Emergency Medical Services (WIEMS). However, many deaf people face barriers to obtaining healthcare. They often have trouble communicating with their healthcare provider, leading to further health issues. It is often difficult for them to create an appointment and to travel to the closest health provider that can accommodate their health needs. Deaf individuals are also more vulnerable to STIs because of communication barriers and misinformation.

=== Trinidad and Tobago ===
The Ministry of Social Development and Family Services partnered with the Trinidad and Tobago Association for the Hearing Impaired in 2017 to provide free hearing aids to deaf people. Both of the agencies collaborated with the Starkey Hearing Foundation to donate hearing aids.

=== Grenada ===
Grenada provides primary care to citizens free of charge, but people who live outside of Grenada may find the level of care to be lower than what they are used to. The healthcare system is run by the Ministry of Health (MOH). The MOH steers policy and financial decisions for the country's thirty-six public health facilities. The facilities are evenly spread throughout the country so that every household is within three miles of a healthcare provider. However, deaf Grenadians often find themselves struggling to find an interpreter to properly communicate medical information. Many doctors and healthcare providers are ill-equipped to care for deaf or hard-of-hearing individuals.

== Language preservation and revitalization ==
In general, sign languages are vulnerable to extinction because they cannot always be written down, and because deaf communities are often small compared to hearing communities. In the Windward Islands, the use of American Sign Language is rising, and the use of other Creole and indigenous sign languages has been decreasing. However, some people are making an effort to keep indigenous sign languages alive.

=== Trinidad and Tobago ===
Trinidad and Tobago Sign Language (TTSL) emerged in the 1950s and 1960s when the country's first deaf school was founded. The emergence of television, the Internet, and social media have enabled deaf Trinidadians and Tobagonians to watch videos of people using other sign languages. These communication technologies have also enabled deaf people to spread the language. According to the University of the West Indies, there is a danger that TTSL could disappear, similar to how the spoken languages Warao and Lokono have disappeared from the country in recent years. Many people use ASL instead of TTSL. For example, according to The Caribbean Educational Research Journal, "there is a sharp difference between the TTSL created and used by Deaf Trinidadians and Tobagonians who went to school before 1975, and the predominance of ASL among younger signers." This issue has created language barriers across the county, as well as a divide between older deaf individuals and the younger population. The move towards mainstreaming deaf children in Trinidad and Tobago has also contributed to the loss of the use of TTSL. In the past, young people learned TTSL from older deaf signers, but many deaf children today have little or no contact with the older signers.

The President of the Deaf Empowerment Organization of Trinidad and Tobago stated, "Some people think that it doesn't matter if TTSL disappears, but it is very precious and it needs to be preserved and continued. Many missionaries have come from America bringing ASL and it has put pressure on TTSL, but we should not let it disappear." TTSL is the primary language of hundreds of deaf Trinidadians and Tobagonians. It is also a source of pride and an expression of cultural identity. In fact, the Deaf Organization of Trinidad and Tobago has pulled away from the government-funded project to produce a dictionary of TTSL. The language is of interest to academics because it is rare to pinpoint a language's exact origins, especially a sign language. The University of the West Indies, which is located in St. Augustine, Trinidad, continues to contribute to and promote the use of TTSL. In fact, the university has hosted two symposiums on deaf culture and sign language in Trinidad and Tobago. It also offers TTSL classes.

=== Saint Vincent ===
Research by SIL International has not revealed any local, indigenous sign languages in Saint Vincent. Some deaf people have access to ASL dictionaries from the United States. However, it is more likely for hearing people to use these dictionaries to learn ASL vocabulary. Deaf children only learn ASL. When deaf people meet at churches or other events, they use ASL. The deaf population in St. Vincent is small, and without a preexisting indigenous sign language, it is likely that deaf people in St. Vincent will continue to use ASL.

=== Grenada ===
In Grenada, deaf individuals report that they all use ASL except for three deaf groups: the older generation who communicate through gestures because they never learned sign language, deaf people who were educated orally, and geographically isolated deaf individuals who use their own home signs. According to SIL International, few deaf schools have access to ASL materials in dictionary or video form. However, there was a book of signs published by the deaf school in Grenada, but there are only a few paper copies still circulating, and there are no digital copies. Due to the lack of any developed sign language other than ASL in Grenada, it is likely that deaf people in Grenada will continue to use ASL.
