= Old Chiangmai–Bangkok Sign Language family =

Related sign languages used in Thailand

Old Chiangmai–Bangkok Sign Language
- Geographic distribution: Thailand
- Native speakers: Estimated >495
- Linguistic classification: Possibly related to other sign languages of SE Asia
- Subdivisions: Chiangmai Sign; Old Bangkok Sign

Language codes
- Glottolog: oldc1250

The Old Chiangmai–Bangkok Sign Language family is a language family of two related sign languages: Chiangmai Sign Language and Old Bangkok Sign Language. Two studies have found that they were 65% cognate, indicating that the two languages are related, possibly due to migration between Chiangmai and Bangkok. There appear to be connections to sign languages of Vietnam, (especially to Haiphong Sign Language), and possibly Laotian sign languages, but the nature of these connections (whether areal or genetic) has not been determined. Village sign languages of Thailand, such as Ban Khor Sign Language, are unrelated.

The primary sign language of Thailand is Modern Thai Sign Language (MTSL), and neither Chiangmai Sign Language or Old Bangkok Sign Language are taught in Thai schools for the deaf, so both languages have fallen out of standard use and are currently endangered.
