= Deafness in Panama =

The deaf and hard-of-hearing (DHH) community in Panama has experienced a range of challenges. The community enjoys early legal recognition and disability rights frameworks, but the lack of newborn screening follow-ups, rural infrastructure and healthcare professionals trained in Lengua de Senas Panamenas (LSP) perpetuates the disparities in medical care, mental health support and public accessibility.

== Sign languages ==
There are two main sign languages practiced in Panama today. Those include Panamanian Sign Language or Lengua de Senas Panamenas (LSP) and Chiriqui Sign Language or Lengua de Senas de Chiriqui (LSCH).

=== Classification ===
Both LSP and LSCH are classified as deaf community languages as the language is practiced within the DHH population and not necessarily used to interact with hearing members.

=== History ===
In August 2007, Panama became the world's fourth country to ratify and incorporate the UN Convention on the Rights of Persons with Disabilities (CRPD) into its legislation. Panama was also amongst the countries to sign the CPRD on the first day. In April 2012, Panama's first formal interpreter training, a short-term course, concluded successfully with 25 graduates, with a graduation ceremony during the International Conference of Sign Language Interpreters. The presidents of World Federation of the Deaf (WFD) and World Association of Sign Language Interpreters (WASLI) were in attendance amongst the 150 participants from multiple countries.

=== Legal status ===
As of 2018, Panama was among 13 Organization of American States (OAS) member states that legally recognize sign as an official language of the DHH community.

=== Community size ===
According to an October 2009 survey, out of Panama's 4.63 million inhabitants, there are approximately 6,000 deaf individuals. Around 2/3 of the population inhabit remote areas where there is no access to a DHH community or sign language.

=== Linguistic relatives ===
Honduras Sign Language (HSL) is a close relative of LSP.

=== Notable features ===
LSP is classified as "threatened" with 60% certainty and as a stable indigenous language.

== Newborn hearing screening ==
Around 35% of babies were screened for hearing loss later in infancy, past the first month. Only 1 in 4 of all babies who failed the screening returned for diagnosis. Even if the babies return for diagnosis, they usually do so later than the guidelines call for, thus delaying treatment and possibly missing the crucial period of early language learning.

== Early intervention ==
In Panama, hearing aids are indicated for hearing loss above 40 dB. Cochlear implantation is indicated for hearing loss above 90 dB and if hearing aids fail. Usually, the "Hospital El Vigia" is the reference site for cochlear implantation in Panama. FRHAON, a Panamanian non-profit that supports children with hearing loss, has performed 25 cochlear implant surgeries since its founding in 1992. The "Fundacion Oir es Vivir" nonprofit established in 2006 helps families with funding for cochlear implant surgery and also has supported the training of four Panamanian doctors in cochlear implantation in Colombia as well as the specialization of 660 speech-language therapists. The Early Stimulation program requires staff to have command over sign language to be able to communicate with deaf children and their parents. The Panamanian Institute of Special Education (IPHE) is partnered with WFD to carry out a teacher-training initiative. With the participation of professionals from the School of the Deaf, a Basic Level 1 Sign Language curriculum was created to educate the teachers. The "Trabajando con las Familias con Bebes Sordos" is a guide to families with deaf children which outlines the developmental milestones for sign language acquisition by age. The guide lists many tips on how to promote sign language in the household and daily routines such as storytelling and reading books in sign.

== Human and civil rights ==
=== UN CRPD status in Panama ===
In 2007, Panama ratified a document that ensures that individuals with disabilities are able to enjoy the fundamental freedoms as equally as everyone else without discrimination in any regard, known as the Convention on the Rights of Persons with Disabilities (CRPD), adopted by the United Nations in 2006. The UN CRPD promotes accessibility and respect towards DHH communities. The Panamanian Government has reported as of 2017 that changes have been implemented as a result of the CRPD-- these human rights-based improvements addressed accessibility of housing, education, and employment. Though some challenges still persist, Panama's government has reported that there has been a steady progress towards more disabilities-inclusive country.

=== WFD priority provisions in connection to UN CRPD status in Panama ===
Article 9 of the UN CRPD focuses on DHH community independently mingling in everyday society. According to the 2015 CRPD, accessibility appears to be limited since Panama has never hired sign language interpreters and instead borrows them from other disability community organizations in Panama like National Disability Secretariat of Panama (SENADIS) and Panamanian Institute for Special Adaptation (IPHE). Furthermore, Article 21, which highlights access to information, is also poorly enforced by the Panamanian government as the report itself admits the need for more sign language interpreters in television channels and programs in order for deaf individuals to access the information being relayed. However, this article appears to be one of Panama's strongest legal foundations among the WFD-priority articles since sign language has been a legally recognized language since 1992.

=== Evidence of DHH being able to/not being able to exercise rights ===
There is some current evidence of active efforts promoting DHH individuals' ability to exercise their human and/or civil rights as citizens/residents of Panama: the country does have a collaboration with Gallaudet University to expand the educational access for DHH Panamanians. In addition, collective advocacy and civil-society participation for their DHH community is boosted by Panama's national deaf association, ANSPA. However, there is also some evidence of limitations against the DHH community's ability to freely exercise their rights. This includes the CPRD Committee in 2017 flagged the gap in Panama's guidance towards the DHH community. Specifically, Panamanians in remote regions with all types of disabilities, not just deafness or hard of hearing, have seldom had a voice in Panama as proper organization and governmental aid/activity is significantly lacking in such areas.

== Healthcare ==
=== Disparities between DHH and hearing populations in physical health outcomes ===
DHH individuals in Panama are at a high risk of misdiagnosis as they are unable to properly communicate their physical symptoms to their providers. The main cause behind this is the undertrained professionals who have little to no exposure to sign language, therefore allowing for a language barrier. Individuals with language barriers, in this case, the DHH community, is 1.5 to 2 times more likely to experience mistreatment compared to the hearing population.

=== Disparities between DHH and hearing populations in mental health outcomes ===
Globally, 50-60% DHH individuals deal with mental health issues. According to the World Health Organization (WHO), Panama's work force seldom includes clinically trained mental health professionals trained in LSP and is consists mainly of general psychologists (29.3%) and social workers (24.6%). Therefore, it can be inferred that though more than half of Panama's DHH individuals experience mental health problems, they may not be able to get proper attention and remediation due to the dearth of clinically trained mental health professionals who can communicate in LSP.

=== Health information and health literacy opportunities for DHH individuals ===
Programs in Panama such as "Breaking Barriers" run on the Social Security Fund and train health care professionals in basic LSP to ensure that DHH patients can better navigate hospital check-ins and consults. The ANSPA, Panama's national association for DHH community advocacy, is the hub for educational workshops and guidance narrated in LSP.

=== Communication with healthcare providers ===
For providers to make sure that the DHH patient understands the conversation and that no vital details were lost in translation, the patient utilizes the teach-back method where, instead of nodding or confirming the understanding by text, the patient signs what they understood back to the provider. Panama has expanded its use of telemedicine, which is a notable advantage for DHH patients as it is now easier for them to connect with remote providers as well as to bring a digital LSP interpreter or text-based chatting for clarifications on medication, follow-ups, etc.

=== DHH access to COVID-19 information ===
Televised briefings such as press conferences and state broadcasts from the Panamanian government during the COVID-19 Pandemic included LSP interpreters. The government also made sure to combine sign language broadcasts with written materials and other disability-friendly forms of communication to cater to the different types of disability found in Panamanians.

=== COVID-19 impact on the DHH Community ===
The strict enforcement of isolation regulations made it more difficult for DHH individuals to gain access to interpreters than it already was. Furthermore, the emphasis on masks deprived DHH individuals of lip-reading as a form of understanding speech. The closure of classrooms and rise of remote learning stemmed direct peer interaction which, for most deaf students who relied on classroom sign language, was only available in the deaf schools they would attend in-person. This also inhibited the long-term development of their signing capabilities.

=== How the DHH pay for healthcare ===
Apart from organizations that help fund cochlear implant surgery for the DHH in poverty, like the Fundacion Oir es Vivir, SENADIS provides a Disability Certificate to individuals with disabilities. In this case, deaf individuals would submit their tonal audiometry results. The certificate provided would grant them 20% off of all surgeries and rehabilitation services.

=== DHH individuals' rights to bodily autonomy ===
According to Panamanian law, the judge must appoint an interpreter for individuals with hearing and/or speech impairments testifying in court. The CRPD Committee recommends that patients and their families are notified of all risks associated with medical procedures and are asked for informed consent before such procedures.
