= PRSL =

PRSL may refer to:

- Puerto Rico Soccer League
- Pennsylvania-Reading Seashore Lines
- Puerto Rican Sign Language
