= Yoruba Sign Language =

Deaf sign language of Nigeria

- Native to: Nigeria
- Region: Yorubaland
- Language family: Deaf-community sign language

Language codes
- ISO 639-3: None (mis)
- Glottolog: yoru1246

Yoruba Sign Language (YSL) is an indigenous sign language of the deaf community in Yoruba-speaking communities of southwestern Nigeria.

Fluent Yoruba requires a large amount of gesture when speaking, which allows minimal communication between the deaf and the hearing. Deaf people in small Yoruba communities use this gesture as the basis of home sign. In larger communities, where there is a sufficient number of deaf people, community sign language has developed. It is not clear how many times this has happened; the Yoruba Sign Language described in the literature is spoken by 32 women in the city of Akurẹ. (Deaf men form a separate community, though some are married to women in the female deaf community. It is not known at present how similar their sign is to that of the women.)

Yoruba Sign Language incorporates many Yoruba gestures as signs (words), as well as the mouthing of many Yoruba words. This local language is unrelated to Nigerian Sign Language, which is based on American Sign Language. "Local" sign is considered less prestigious to Nigerian/American Sign Language, especially among bilingual signers, but it is nonetheless entrenched; its robustness is presumably related to its basis in Yoruba culture.
