= Laotian sign languages =

Deaf sign languages used in Laos

- Native to: Laos
- Region: Scattered
- Native speakers: 36,000 (2021)
- Language family: Deaf-community sign languages

Language codes
- ISO 639-3: lso
- Glottolog: (insufficiently attested or not a distinct language) laos1235
- ELP: Original Laos Sign Language

There are an unknown number of indigenous deaf sign languages in Laos, which may have historical connections with the languages indigenous to Vietnam and Thailand, though it is not known if they are related to each other. There is no single "Laotian Sign Language". Sign languages in use in Laos include French Sign Language, American Sign Language, Thai Sign Language, Lao Sign Language (derived from FSL), and Home sign.

== See also ==
- Thai Sign Language
- Vietnamese sign languages
