= Ethiopian sign languages =

Deaf sign language of Ethiopia

Ethiopian sign
- Native to: Ethiopia
- Native speakers: 560,000 (2021)
- Language family: Deaf-community sign languages

Language codes
- ISO 639-3: eth
- Glottolog: ethi1238

A number of Ethiopian sign languages have been used in various Ethiopian schools for the deaf since 1971, and at the primary level since 1956. Ethiopian Sign Language, presumably a national standard, is used in primary, secondary, and—at Addis Ababa University—tertiary education, and on national television.

== Bibliography ==
- Abadi Tsegay. 2011. Offline Candidate Hand Gesture Selection And Trajectory Determination For Continuous Ethiopian Sign Language. MA thesis, Addis Ababa University. Thesis download
- Abeje, Bekalu Tadele, Ayodeji Olalekan Salau, Abreham Debasu Mengistu, and Nigus Kefyalew Tamiru. "Ethiopian sign language recognition using deep convolutional neural network." Multimedia Tools and Applications 81, no. 20 (2022): 29027-29043.
- Admasu, Yonas Fantahun, and Kumudha Raimond. "Ethiopian sign language recognition using Artificial Neural Network." In 2010 10th International Conference on Intelligent Systems Design and Applications, pp. 995–1000. IEEE, 2010.
- Assefa, Daniel. "Amharic speech training for the deaf." PhD diss., Addis Ababa University, 2006.
- Dagnachew Feleke Wolde. 2011. Machine Translation System for Amharic Text to Ethiopian Sign Language. MA thesis, Addis Ababa University. Thesis download
- Duarte, Kyle. 2010. The Mechanics of Fingerspelling: Analyzing Ethiopian Sign Language. Sign Language Studies 11.1: 5-21.
- Gebretinsae, Eyob. Vision Based Finger Spelling Recognition for Ethiopian Sign Language. PhD diss., Addis Ababa University, 2012.
- Morgan, Michael. "Complexities of Ethiopian Sign Language contact phenomena and implications for AAU." French Centre for Ethiopian Studies, National Centre for Scientific Research in France. Online: https://www.academia. edu/1230482/Complexities_of_Ethiopian_Sign_Language_ Contact_Phenomena_and_Implications_for_AAU (2009).
- Nigus, Kefyalew. Amharic Sign Language Recognition based on Amharic Alphabet Signs. PhD diss., Addis Ababa University, 2018.
- Pawlos Kassu Abebe. "The linguistic nature of expression of aspect in Ethiopian sign language." Grammatical and Sociolinguistic Aspects of Ethiopian Languages, edited by Derib Ado, Almaz Wasse Gelagay, Janne Bondi Johannessen, pp. 367–388. (2021)
- Tamene, Eyasu Hailu. 2017. The Sociolinguistics of Ethiopian Sign Language: A Study of Language Use and Attitudes. (Sociolinguistics in Deaf Communities Series 23.) Washington, DC: Gallaudet University Press.
- Tamene, Eyasu Hailu. 2016. Language Use in Ethiopian Sign Language. Sign Language Studies Vol. 16, Iss. 3: 307–329.
- Tsegay, Abadi and Kumudha Raimond. "Offline candidate hand gesture selection and trajectory determination for continuous Ethiopian sign language." Journal of Theoretical and Applied Information Technology 36, no. 1 (2012).
- Woinshet Girma. "Polysemy of Ethiopian sign language." Grammatical and Sociolinguistic Aspects of Ethiopian Languages, edited by Derib Ado, Almaz Wasse Gelagay, Janne Bondi Johannessen, pp. 389–412. 2021.
- Zegeye, Daniel. Amharic Sentence to Ethiopian Sign Language Translator. PhD diss., Addis Ababa University, 2014.
- Zerubabel, Legesse. Ethiopian Finger Spelling Classification: A Study to Automate Ethiopian Sign Language. PhD diss., Addis Ababa University, 2008.
