= Penang Sign Language =

Deaf sign language of Malaysia

- Bahasa Isyarat Pulau Pinang
- Native to: Malaysia
- Region: originally Penang
- Native speakers: 1,000 older signers (no date) most bilingual in Malaysian Sign
- Language family: Deaf-community sign language

Language codes
- ISO 639-3: psg
- Glottolog: pena1248
- ELP: Penang Sign Language

Penang Sign Language (Malay: Bahasa Isyarat Pulau Pinang) was developed in Malaysia by deaf children, outside the classroom, when oralism was predominant. It is now mainly used by older people, although many younger people can understand it.

== History ==
Penang Sign Language began when the first school for the deaf, Federation School for the Deaf (FSD), was established by Lady Templer, the wife of the British High Commissioner in Malaya, in 1954. Deaf students went to FSD, to learn oral skills, not sign language. However, the students would sign by themselves in the dormitory of FSD every night.

In the 1960s, Tan Yap went to Gallaudet University in Washington, D.C. to learn deaf culture and sign language. He brought an ASL book back with him to Malaysia. But Tan Yap's suggestions were rejected by the Government.

An American, Professor Frances Parsons, travelled around the world in 1976 in order to introduce Total Communication and Sign Language to poor schools for the deaf, in order to better prepare them for education. In the same year, Frances Parsons went to Kuala Lumpur to meet with Mahathir Mohamad, the Minister of Education. After a 45-minute discussion, Mahathir agreed with Parsons's suggestions and theory. In the next few days, Mahathir announced new legislation that obliged schools in Malaysia to teach Total Communication and Sign Language. As a result, BIM (Bahasa Isyarat Malaysia) or MSL (Malaysian Sign Language) became similar to American Sign Language after 1976.

== See also ==
- Malaysian Sign Language (MSL)
- Selangor Sign Language (SSL or KLSL)
- Kod Tangan Bahasa Malaysia (KTBM)
