= Malaysian Sign Language =

Sign language

- BIM
- Bahasa Isyarat Malaysia, BIM
- Native to: Malaysia
- Native speakers: 60,000 (2013 census)
- Language family: French Sign: American Sign; Malaysian Sign Language

Language codes
- ISO 639-3: xml
- Glottolog: mala1412

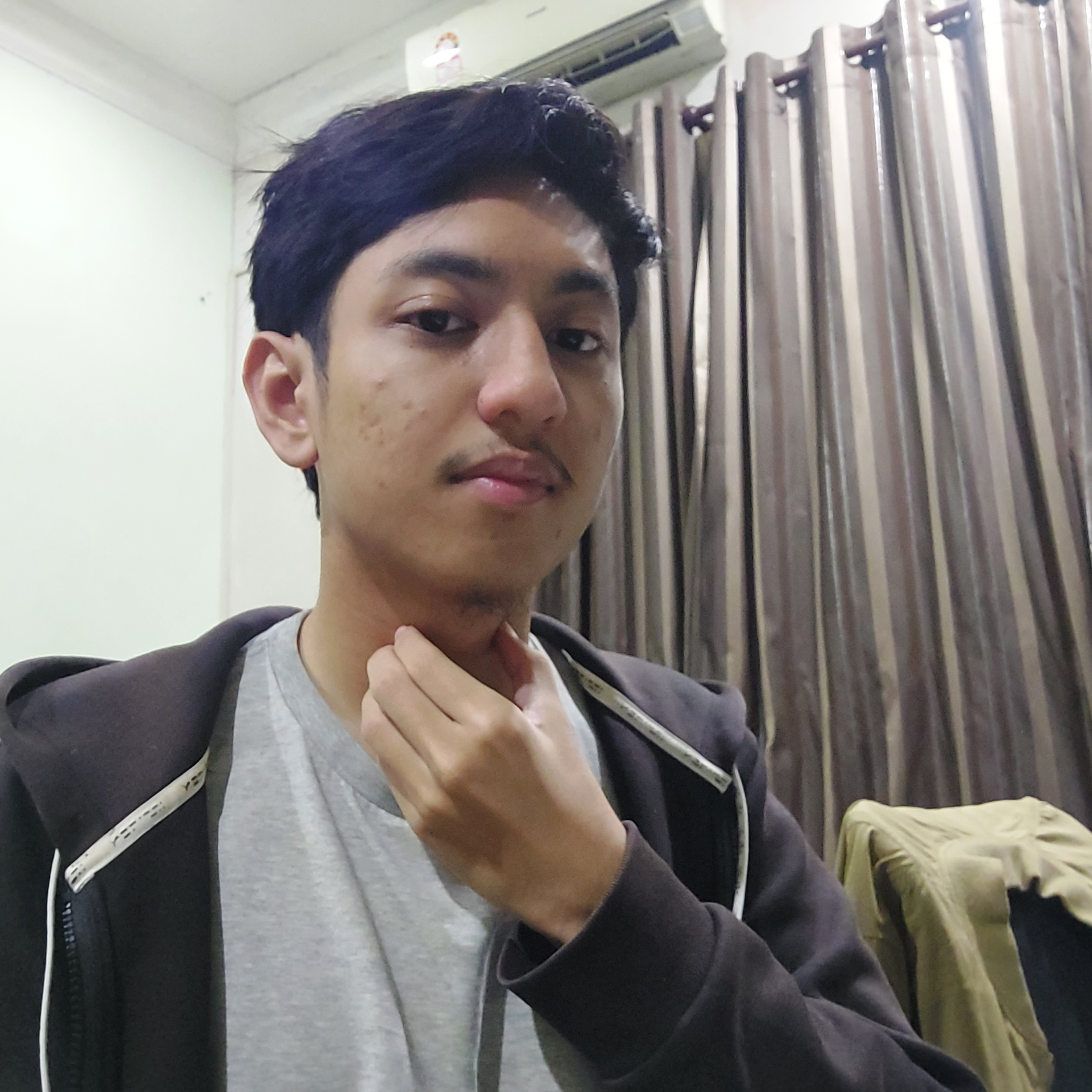
"Perak" (Malaysian state) in Malaysian Sign Language.

Malaysian Sign Language (Malay: Bahasa Isyarat Malaysia, or BIM) is the principal language of the deaf community of Malaysia. It is also the official sign language used by the Malaysian government to communicate with the deaf community and was officially recognized by the Malaysian government in 2008 as a means to officially communicate with and among the deaf, particularly on official broadcasts and announcements. BIM has many dialects, differing from state to state.

Malaysian Sign Language was created with the establishment of the Malaysian Federation of the Deaf in 1998, and its use has expanded among deaf leaders and participants. It is based on American Sign Language (ASL), but the two are considered different languages. Kod Tangan Bahasa Malaysia or Manually Coded Malay (KTBM) is another teaching method created by hearing educators and linguists in between 1980 and 1986 and remains the only form of sign recognized by the Malaysian Ministry of Education as a method to teach Malay to deaf students in formal education settings rather than act as an official language. However, it is not a language in itself, but a means of manually coding the Malay language. The use of KTBM supposedly makes it easier for teachers to teach the Malay language to deaf students.

Sign languages which predate BIM in Malaysia are Penang Sign (PSL) and Selangor Sign (Kuala Lumpur Sign, SSL or KLSL). Additionally, every parent of deaf children uses unique created signs, called home signs, for gestural communication. The use of such home signs among peranakan or ethnic Chinese users of BIM may be responsible for the controversy over the supposed influence of Chinese Sign Languages, which is not well documented and may merely be based on ethnic stereotyping.

To further educate and promote the use of BIM, MFD implemented the BIM Sign Bank as the official source of reference for the sign language to the community, including students, teachers, parents, and the general users. In collaboration with Guidewire Gives Back, the BIM Sign Bank application, "BIM Sign Bank by MFD", was developed and launched in July 2021.
