= Sri Lankan Sign Language =

Deaf sign language of Sri Lanka

- Native to: Sri Lanka
- Native speakers: unknown number of 13,000 deaf people (1986)
- Language family: Deaf-community sign languages

Language codes
- ISO 639-3: sqs
- Glottolog: sril1237
- ELP: Sri Lankan Sign Language

Sri Lankan Sign Language (Sinhala: ශ්‍රී ලංකා සංඥා භාෂාව, romanized: Śrī Laṁkā Saṁgnā Bhāṣāva) is a visual language used by deaf people in Sri Lanka and has regional variations stemming from the 25 Deaf schools in Sri Lanka.

== Classification ==
Wittmann (1991) posits that the Sri Lankan languages, as a group, are a language isolate ('prototype' sign language), though one developed through stimulus diffusion from an existing sign language. It is not known if they are related to each other, nor how many there are.
