= Windward Islands =

Islands of the Lesser Antilles, within the West Indies

English: Windward Islands French: Îles du Vent
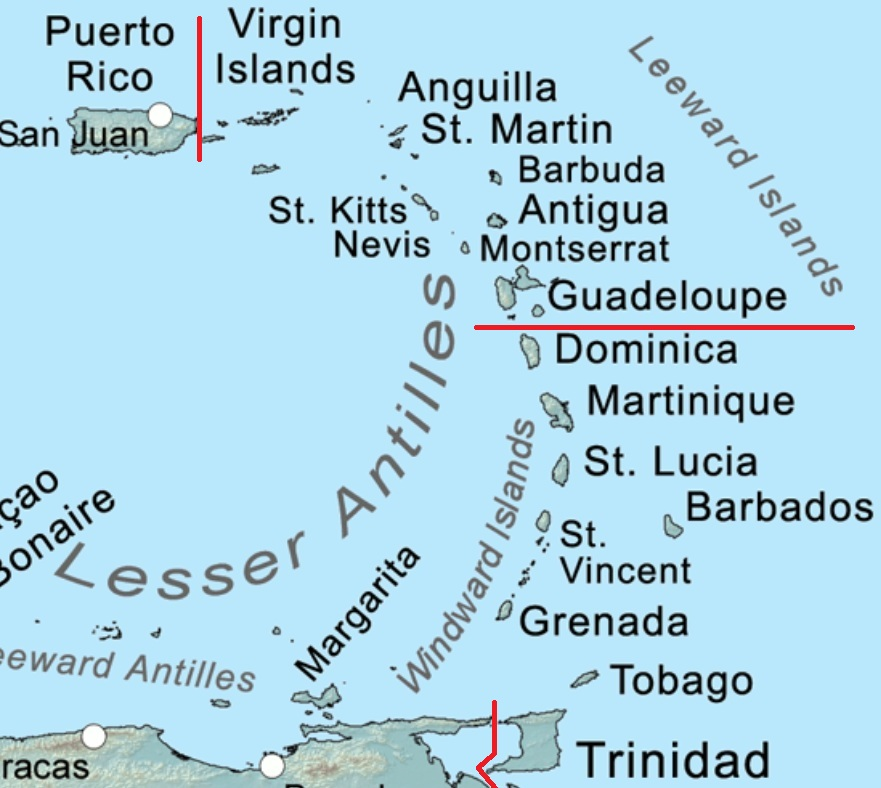
- Location of Windward Islands within Caribbean (dark purple shading) Map of the Windward Islands from Dominica to Trinidad and Tobago in the Caribbean
- Interactive map of Windward Islands

Geography
- Location: Caribbean Sea; North Atlantic Ocean
- Coordinates: 14°N 61°W
- Total islands: 90+
- Major islands: Carriacou; Dominica; Grenada; Martinique; Petite Martinique; Saint Lucia; Saint Vincent
- Area: 3,232.5 km^{2} (1,248.1 sq mi)
- Highest elevation: 1,447 m (4747 ft)
- Highest point: Morne Diablotins, Dominica

Administration
- Dominica
- Largest settlement: Roseau
- Grenada
- Largest settlement: St. George's
- Martinique
- Largest settlement: Fort-de-France
- Saint Lucia
- Largest settlement: Castries
- Saint Vincent and the Grenadines
- Largest settlement: Kingstown

Demographics
- Population: c. 854,000
- Pop. density: 227/km^{2} (588/sq mi)

The Windward Islands are a group of islands in the Lesser Antilles of the West Indies in the Caribbean region of the Americas, situated where the southeastern Caribbean Sea meets the western North Atlantic Ocean. Located approximately between latitudes 10° and 16° N and longitudes 60° and 62° W, they extend from Dominica in the north to Trinidad and Tobago in the south. They lie south of the Leeward Islands, northern islands from the Virgin Islands to Guadeloupe, and east of the Leeward Antilles, southwestern islands from the Federal Dependencies of Venezuela to Aruba.

The name was also used to refer to a British colony which existed between 1833 and 1960 and originally consisted of the islands of Grenada, Saint Lucia, and Saint Vincent. Today, these islands constitute three sovereign states, the latter of which is now known as Saint Vincent and the Grenadines.

The island of Dominica was traditionally considered a part of the Leeward Islands until 1940, when it was transferred from the British Leeward Islands colony to the British Windward Islands. It now composes the fourth sovereign state in the group.

Barbados (until 1885) and Tobago (until 1889) were also part of the British Windward Islands colony but are not today regarded as being part of the Windward Islands grouping. Martinique is the only windward island that is an overseas département of France, which it has been since 1946 and which is 7,000 kilometers away from Paris.

== Name and geography ==
The prevailing trade winds in the West Indies blow east to west. The combination of trans-Atlantic currents and winds that provided the fastest route across the ocean brought sailing ships heading to the New World to the rough dividing line between two groups of islands. Those that fell to windward became the Windward Islands, to leeward the Leeward Islands.

Sailing vessels departing from Africa would first encounter the southeasternmost "Windward" islands of the Lesser Antilles in their west-northwesterly heading to the final destinations in the Caribbean, Central America, and Northern America. The chain of Windward Islands forms a part of the easternmost boundary of the Caribbean Sea.

However, even in modern usage in languages other than English, notably Dutch, French, and Spanish, all of the Lesser Antilles from the Virgin Islands to Trinidad and Tobago are known as the 'Windward Islands' (Bovenwindse Eilanden in Dutch, Îles du Vent in French, and Islas de Barlovento in Spanish). The ABC Islands and the other islands along the Venezuelan coast, known in English as the Leeward Antilles, are known in languages other than English as the 'Leeward Islands'.

== Countries and territories ==
There are four countries and one territory in the Windward Islands:

- Dominica
- Grenada
  - Carriacou and Petite Martinique
- Martinique (France)
- Saint Lucia
- Saint Vincent and the Grenadines
  - Grenadines
  - Saint Vincent

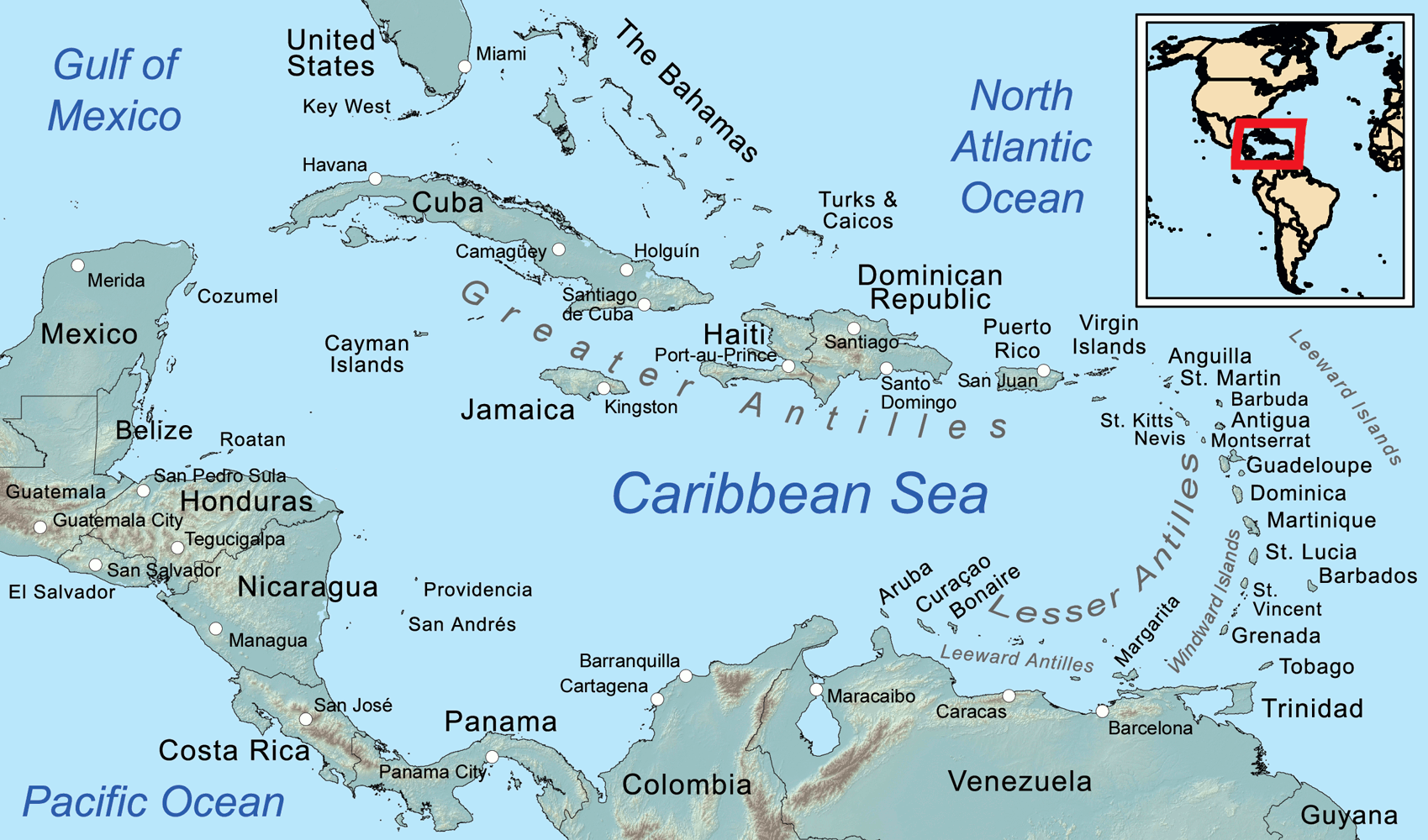
The Windward Islands are on the map's lower right, above and to the right of Venezuela

== See also ==
- British Windward Islands
- Deafness in the Windward Islands
- Intra-Americas Sea
- Leeward Antilles
- Leeward Islands
- Lesser Antilles
- Lesser Antilles topics
  - Leeward Islands topics
  - Windward Islands topics
- Windward Islands Cricket Board of Control
- Windward Islands cricket team
