= Maroua Sign Language =

Deaf sign language of Cameroon

- Extreme North Cameroon Sign Language
- Native to: Cameroon
- Region: Maroua, Far North Region
- Native speakers: c. 150 (no date)
- Language family: Deaf-community sign language?

Language codes
- ISO 639-3: None (mis)
- Glottolog: extr1248

Maroua Sign Language is a sign language used by approximately 150 people in and around the town of Maroua, capital of the Far North Region of Cameroon.
