= Trinidad and Tobago Sign Language =

Deaf sign language of Trinidad and Tobago

Trinidad and Tobago Sign Language (TTSL)
- Trinidadian Sign Language (TSL)
- Native to: Trinidad and Tobago
- Native speakers: 2,000 (2008)
- Language family: Deaf-community sign

Language codes
- ISO 639-3: lst
- Glottolog: trin1277
- ELP: Trinidad and Tobago Sign Language

Trinidad and Tobago Sign Language (TTSL), sometimes called Trinidadian or Trinbago Sign Language (TSL) is the indigenous deaf sign language of Trinidad and Tobago, originating in about 1943 when the first deaf school opened, the Cascade School for the Deaf. It is not used in deaf education, which has been the domain of American Sign Language since about 1974, when a philosophy of Total Communication replaced previous Oralist approaches. A mixture of TTSL and ASL is used in Deaf associations, with TTSL being used more heavily in informal situations. The younger generation does not know the language well, as they only learn ASL in school, but teachers are starting to switch over to TTSL.

Many people in Trinidad and Tobago use the name Trinidad and Tobago Sign Language to refer to any variety of signing in the islands, which includes a range of signing varieties from TTSL to ASL and various blended versions in-between. Others make a distinction between ASL (or TTASL) and TTSL.
