= Saigon Sign Language =

Sign language used in southern Vietnam

Ho Chi Minh City Sign
- Saigon Sign
- Native to: Vietnam
- Signers: 45,000 (2015)
- Language family: (SE Asian sign area): Deaf-community sign language; Vietnamese sign languages; Ho Chi Minh City Sign

Language codes
- ISO 639-3: hos
- Glottolog: hoch1237
- ELP: Ho Chi Minh City Sign Language

Ho Chi Minh City Sign Language (HCMCSL), also known as Sai Gon Sign Language, is the language of many deaf communities in the south of Vietnam. Research on this sign language started when James Woodward came to Ha Noi in 1997 to do research on sign languages in Vietnam. It is about 50% cognate with the other sign languages of Vietnam, and its vocabulary has been extensively influenced by the French Sign Language once taught in Vietnamese schools for the deaf.
