= Hanoi Sign Language =

Deaf sign language of Hanoi, Vietnam

Hanoi Sign
- Native to: Vietnam
- Native speakers: 39,000 (2015)
- Language family: (SE Asian sign area): Deaf-community sign language; Vietnamese sign languages; Hanoi Sign

Language codes
- ISO 639-3: hab
- Glottolog: hano1243
- ELP: Hanoi Sign Language

Hanoi Sign Language is the deaf-community sign language of the city of Hanoi in Vietnam. It is about 50% cognate with the other sign languages of Vietnam, and its vocabulary has been extensively influenced by the French Sign Language once taught in Vietnamese schools for the deaf.
