= Jamaican Country Sign Language =

Deaf sign language of Jamaica

- Country Sign, Konchri Sain Language
- Native to: Jamaica
- Native speakers: 7,500 (2011)
- Language family: Language Isolate

Official status
- Regulated by: Not Regulated

Language codes
- ISO 639-3: jcs
- Glottolog: jama1256
- ELP: Jamaican Country Sign Language

Jamaican Country Sign Language, also Country Sign, or Konchri Sain (KS) in Jamaican Patois, is an indigenous village sign language of Jamaica. It is used by a small number of Deaf and hearing Jamaicans, spread over several communities in the rural south-western parish of St. Elizabeth.

The introduction of formal education for the St. Elizabeth deaf in 1975 by American Mennonite missionaries introduced two additional signed systems which have negatively affected KS: Signed English and American Sign Language. School officials strongly discouraged the use of the language inside and outside the classroom, resulting in a significant reduction in the number of fluent KS signers and a dramatic decline in the language's prestige. Thus, by 1985, KS was used primarily by elderly monolingual Deaf community members, while other community members used Jamaican Sign Language, a dialect of American Sign Language.

In 2007 it was estimated that the language would become extinct in the next twenty to thirty years, if deliberate effort was not taken to save it by means of an effective language planning strategy. The University of the West Indies in conjunction with the University of Central London had already begun working on a language documentation project for the language. A 2011 sociolinguistic survey reported that there were deaf adult KS signers on the island in 2009.
