= Thai Sign Language =

National sign language of Thailand

- ภาษามือไทย
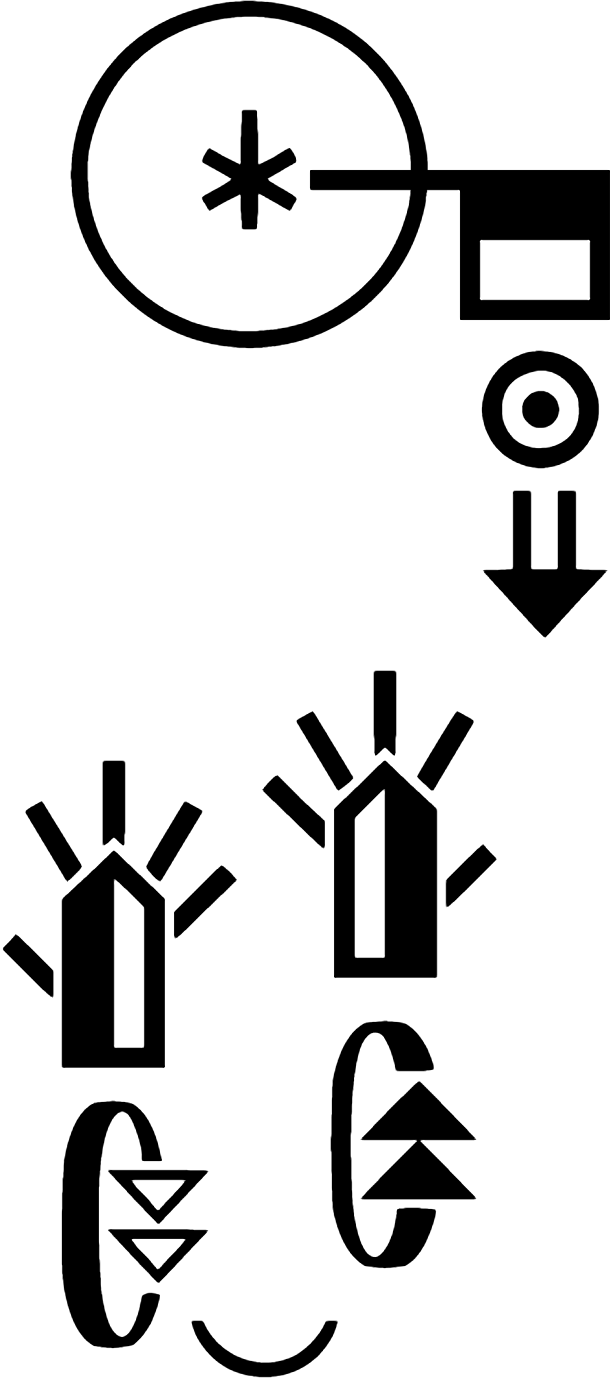
- Native to: Thailand
- Native speakers: estimated 90,000–300,000 deaf (2008)
- Language family: Creole of American Sign (French family), Old Bangkok Sign and Old Chiangmai Sign. Possibly related to sign languages in Vietnam and Laos.

Language codes
- ISO 639-3: tsq
- Glottolog: thai1240

Thai Sign Language (TSL; Thai: ภาษามือไทย, romanized: P̣hās̄ʹā mụ̄x thịy), or Modern Standard Thai Sign Language (MSTSL), is the national sign language of Thailand's deaf community and is used in most parts of the country by the 20 percent of the estimated 56,000 pre-linguistically deaf people who go to school.

Thai Sign Language is related to American Sign Language (ASL), and belongs to the same language family as ASL. This relatedness is due to language contact and creolisation that has occurred between ASL, which was introduced into deaf schools in Thailand in the 1950s by American-trained Thai educators, and at least two indigenous sign languages that were in use at the time: Old Bangkok Sign Language and Chiangmai Sign Language. These original sign languages probably developed in market towns and urban areas where deaf people had opportunities to meet. They are now considered moribund languages, remembered by older signers but no longer used for daily conversation. These older varieties may be related to the sign languages of Vietnam and Laos.

Thai Sign Language was acknowledged as "the national language of deaf people in Thailand" in August 1999, in a resolution signed by the Minister of Education on behalf of the Royal Thai Government. As with many sign languages, the means of transmission to children occurs within families with signing deaf parents and in schools for the deaf. A robust process of language teaching and acculturation among deaf children has been documented and photographed in the Thai residential schools for the deaf.

There are other moribund sign languages in the country such as Ban Khor Sign Language.

== See also ==
- Deafness in Thailand
