= Manually Coded Malay =

Signed form of the Malay language

Kod Tangan Bahasa Malaysia (KTBM), or Manually Coded Malay, is a signed form of the Malay language recognized by the government in Malaysia and the Malaysian Ministry of Education. It aids teachers in teaching the Malay language to deaf students in formal education settings. It is not a language but a manually coded form of Malay. It was adapted from American Sign Language (or Manually Coded English), with the addition of some local signs, plus grammatical signs to represent Malay affixation of nouns and verbs. It is used in Deaf schools to teach the Malay language.

The official Malaysian Sign Language, known as Bahasa Isyarat Malaysia, is the official sign language the Malaysian government recognizes to communicate with the deaf community, including on official broadcasts. It is a language in its own right and not a manual coding of the Malay language like KTBM. It has been found that Malaysian Sign Language is more effective in teaching students than Manually Coded Malay.
