= Janne Bondi Johannessen =

Norwegian linguist

Janne Bondi Johannessen (1 August 1960 – 15 June 2020) was a Norwegian linguist.

She was born in Asker. Having initially dropped out of secondary school to pursue another path, she finished examen artium and became interested in linguistics when learning Greek. Johannessen graduated from the University of Oslo with the cand.philol. degree in 1988. In 1993 she became managing director of the Text Laboratory at the University of Oslo, and the following year she completed her doctoral thesis for the dr.philos. degree.

Her thesis about syntactic coordination was published by Oxford University Press. She held the rank of professor at the University of Oslo while managing the Text Laboratory throughout her career. Eventually, her research was connected with the center of excellence Multilingualism in Society Across the Lifespan. She published 130 academic articles and wrote two books. She served as president of the Northern European Association for Language Technology and was inducted into the Norwegian Academy of Science and Letters.

Among the Nordic dialects she studied were West Jutlandic and Elfdalian. In the 2010s she studied the slowly perishing American Norwegian language. She also opined against the local attempts to make Norwegian Nynorsk a non-compulsory subject in schools, calling it "an affront to our culture and our identity as Norwegian".

Locally, she was the leader of a lobby group to save the Kolsås Line and leader of Kolsås neighborhood association. She was married and had three children. She died from illness shortly before her 60th birthday.
