= Ban Khor Sign Language =

Village sign language in Thailand

- ภาษามือบ้านค้อ
- Native to: Thailand
- Native speakers: 400 (2009)
- Language family: sign language: village sign; isolate; Ban Khor Sign Language

Language codes
- ISO 639-3: bfk
- Glottolog: bank1251
- ELP: Ban Khor Sign Language

Ban Khor Sign Language (BKSL; Thai: ภาษามือบ้านค้อ) is a village sign language used by at least 400 people of a rice-farming community in the village of Ban Khor in a remote area of Isan (northeastern Thailand). Known locally as pasa kidd ('language of the mute'), it developed in the 1930s due to a high number of deaf people. Estimated number of users in 2009 was 16 deaf and approximately 400 hearing out of 2741 villagers. It is a language isolate, independent of the other sign languages of Thailand such as Old Bangkok Sign Language and the national Thai Sign Language.

Thai Sign Language is increasingly exerting an influence on BKSL. Younger Deaf attend distant residential Deaf schools where they learn Thai Sign Language. Even middle-aged hearing people are using Thai SL vocabulary mixed with BKSL. Attitudes favoring Thai SL over BKSL are beginning to be expressed.

== Other local sign languages ==
Other village sign languages have been reported from the Ban Khor area, in the villages of Plaa Pag, Huay Hai and Na Sai. They have not been documented, so it is not known if they are dialects of BKSL or if they are distinct languages.
