= Varieties of American Sign Language =

Dialects and descendants of American Sign Language

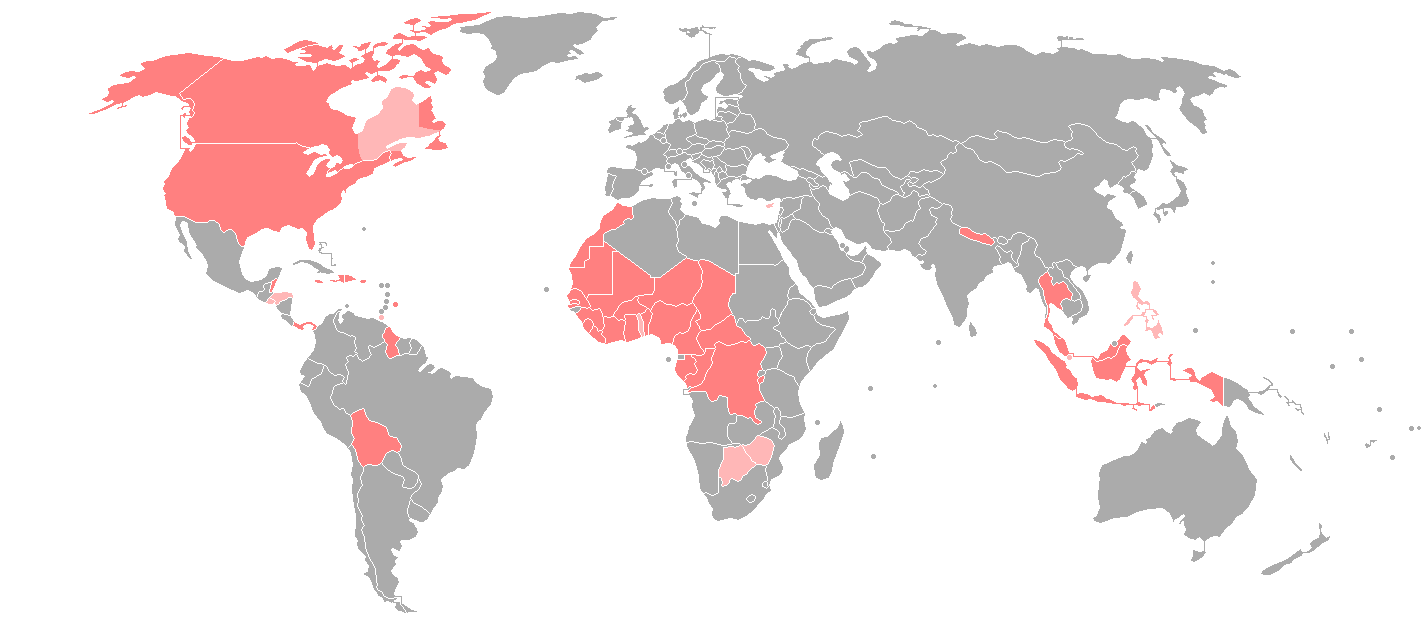
Varieties and descendants of ASL are used throughout the Caribbean, West and Central Africa, and Southeast Asia

Map of North American Francosign languages, including varieties of ASL covered by the dashed line

American Sign Language (ASL) developed in the United States, starting as a blend of local sign languages and French Sign Language (FSL). Local varieties have developed in many countries, but there is little research on which should be considered dialects of ASL (such as Bolivian Sign Language) and which have diverged to the point of being distinct languages (such as Malaysian Sign Language).

The following are sign language varieties of ASL in countries other than the US and Canada, languages based on ASL with substratum influence from local sign languages, and mixed languages in which ASL is a component. Distinction follow political boundaries, which may not correspond to linguistic boundaries.

== Bolivian Sign Language ==
Bolivian Sign Language
- Lengua de Señas Bolivianas LSB
- Native to: Bolivia
- Native speakers: 22,600 (2008)
- Language family: French Sign: American Sign; Bolivian Sign Language

Language codes
- ISO 639-3: bvl
- Glottolog: boli1236
- ELP: Bolivian Sign Language

Bolivian Sign Language (Lengua de Señas Bolivianas, LSB) is a dialect of American Sign Language (ASL) used predominantly by the Deaf in Bolivia.

=== History ===
In 1973, American Sign Language was brought to Bolivia by Eleanor and Lloyd Powlison, missionaries from the United States. An indigenous sign language (or perhaps sign languages) existed before the introduction and adoption of American Sign Language, though it is unknown how widespread or unified it was.

The first book of LSB was published in 1992, but more than 90% of the signs were from ASL. Due to research work in the 1990s and 2000s a lot of expressions in LSB were collected by Bolivian Deaf, and education materials for learning LSB or teaching in LSB were published. The dependence on words used in ASL was reduced, but the usage of ASL words still is over 70%.

Today LSB is used by more deaf Bolivians than the reported 400 in 1988 in the Ethnologue report, due to the introduction of bilingual education (LSB as primary language and Spanish as secondary language) originally in Riberalta and its adoption to other schools in Bolivia with the support of the Education Ministry of Bolivia and the growing social exchange of the Deaf.

In 1988, there were a total of 9 deaf institutions in the country and 46,800 deaf Bolivians. In 2002 there were approximately 25 deaf schools.

== Burundian Sign Language ==
Burundian Sign Language
- Langue des Signes Burundaise
- Native to: Burundi
- Native speakers: 5,000 (2020) to estimated 35,000–70,000 (2021)
- Language family: American Sign: Burundian Sign Language

Language codes
- ISO 639-3: lsb
- Glottolog: buru1325 Burundi Sign Language

Burundian Sign Language (LSB) is the national sign language of Burundi's Deaf community. It dates from Andrew Foster's introduction of ASL into Burundi, but has diverged since. Mouthing and initialization are mostly based on French. ASL signers from the US are reported to have a hard time understanding videos in LSB, and LSB signers have a hard time understanding ASL videos, and Burundian Deaf consider their language to be distinct from ASL and from neighboring sign languages, such as Ugandan and Rwandan Sign.

== Costa Rican Sign Language ==
Costa Rican Sign Language
- New Costa Rican Sign Language
- Native to: Costa Rica
- Native speakers: estimated 10,000–20,000 (2021)
- Language family: Creole of American Sign (French family) and Old Costa Rican Sign

Language codes
- ISO 639-3: csr
- Glottolog: cost1249

Costa Rican Sign Language, also known as LESCO (La lengua de señas costarricense), New Costa Rican Sign Language or Modern Costa Rican Sign Language, is the national sign language of Costa Rica's Deaf community. It is used primarily by people born after 1960, and is about 60% cognate with American Sign Language (Woodward 1991, 1992). It is unrelated to two known village sign languages of Costa Rica, Bribri Sign Language and Brunca Sign Language.

== Dominican Sign Language ==
Dominican Sign Language
- Native to: Dominican Republic
- Native speakers: estimated 21,000–43,000 (2021)
- Language family: French Sign: American Sign; Dominican Sign Language

Language codes
- ISO 639-3: doq
- Glottolog: domi1236

Dominican Sign Language (DGS) is a local variant of American Sign Language (ASL) used in the Dominican Republic. Many deaf Dominicans use home sign, and are not fluent in Dominican Sign Language.

Dominican Sign Language originated from French Sign Language (LSF), which was introduced to Dominica by French missionaries and combined with local gesture traditions. Therefore, it has many similarities with French Sign Language.

There may also be some differences in grammatical structure between Dominican Sign Language and American Sign Language. For example, there may be differences in sentence structure, verb morphology, and word order.

== Francophone African Sign Language ==
Francophone African Sign Language
- Native to: Ivory Coast, Benin, Cameroon, Gabon, and other areas of Francophone West and Central Africa
- Native speakers: 12,500 in Benin (2008), 100,000 / est. 60,000–120,000 in Burkina Faso (2021), est. 14,000–28,000 in CAR (2021), est. 16,000–32,000 in Congo (2021), 2,000 (2008) to 7,000 (2021) in Gabon, est. 38,000–76,000 in Guinea (2021), est. 77,000–155,000 in Ivory Coast (2021), est. 20,000–35,000 in Mali (2021), est. 24,000–48,000 in Togo (2021), no data elsewhere
- Language family: French Sign: American Sign; Francophone African Sign Language

Language codes
- ISO 639-3: None (mis); Individual code: gus – Guinean Sign Language
- Glottolog: guin1250 Guinean Sign Language lang1335 Langue des Signes Zairoise

Francophone African Sign Language (Langue des signes d'Afrique francophone, or LSAF) is the variety, or varieties, of American Sign Language (ASL) used in several francophone countries of Africa. Education for the deaf in these countries is based on ASL and written French; there is therefore a French influence on the language of the classroom.

With the exception of Algerian Sign Language, the sign languages of francophone Africa are unrelated to French Sign Language, except indirectly through their derivation from ASL. This is because most schools for the deaf in the region were founded by the American missionary Andrew Foster or by his students, starting in 1974. Chadian Sign Language may be closest to Nigerian Sign Language. A few countries have languages unrelated to either: Madagascar Sign Language derives from Norwegian SL, and Tunisian Sign Language is apparently a language isolate.

The relationship of LSAF to standard American Sign Language has not been systematically assessed. For instance, Gabonese Sign Language has diverged and may be a separate language, and Togo Sign Language is not mutually intelligible with standard American Sign Language.

=== Characteristics ===
As in other African derivations of ASL, the language has been affected by local gestures and conventions. This is especially true of taboo topics such as sex.

As an example of the French influence on francophone ASL, the word for 'she' is made by pointing with an L-shaped hand, rather than with a simple index finger, because the name of the letter el is homonymous with elle ('she') in French. It is not clear to what extent such influence continues outside the classroom.

=== Location ===
Francophone African countries which use ASL as the language of Deaf instruction are:

- Senegal
- Mauritania
- Mali
- Guinea
- Ivory Coast
- Burkina Faso
- Togo
- Benin
- Niger
- Chad (from Nigeria)
- Central African Republic
- Gabon
- Republic of Congo (Brazzaville; from Nigeria)
- Democratic Republic of Congo (Kinshasa; French Sign Language is also used)
- Burundi
- Morocco

== Haitian Sign Language ==
Haitian Sign Language
- Langue des Signes Haïtienne
- Native to: Haiti
- Native speakers: 40,000 (2008)
- Language family: French Sign: American Sign; Haitian Sign Language

Language codes
- ISO 639-3: –
- Glottolog: hait1245

While American Sign Language is sometimes used in the Haitian Deaf community, it is not the most prominent in Haiti. The local variant, Haitian Sign Language, or LSH (Langue des Signes Haïtienne), is the sign language variant most often used. There are five government-run schools for Deaf children, and LSH is used and spread through these schools and other social areas for the Deaf community. Historically, LSH has not been widely documented or recognized, leading to the creation of the LSHDoP, the Haitian Sign Language Documentation Project. This project is run by the Haitian Deaf Community, in collaboration with Gallaudet University.

== Ghanaian Sign Language ==
Ghanaian Sign Language
- Native to: Ghana
- Native speakers: estimated 91,000–182,000 (2021)
- Language family: French Sign: American Sign; Ghanaian Sign Language

Language codes
- ISO 639-3: gse
- Glottolog: ghan1235

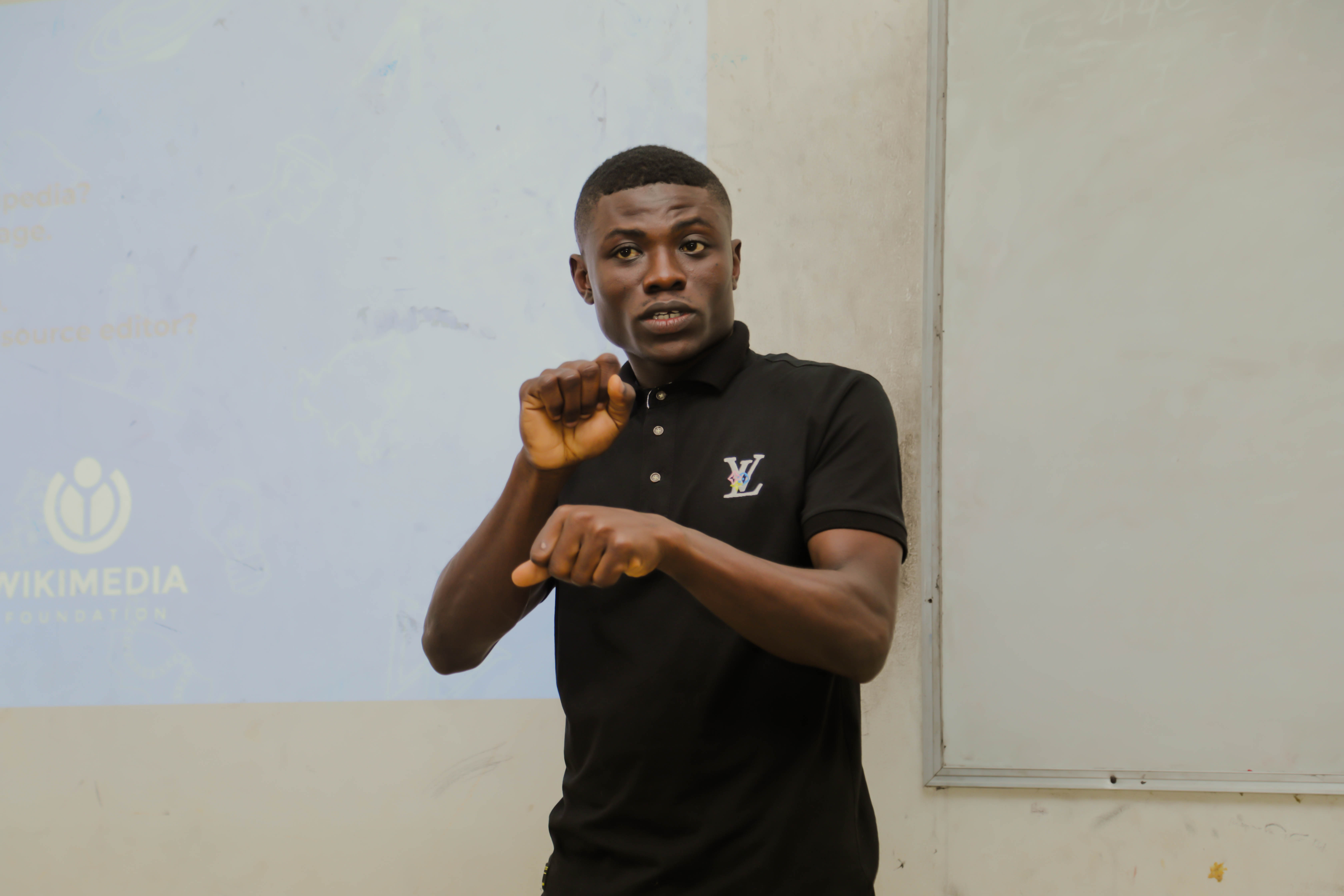
Ghanaian Sign Language in action

Ghanaian Sign Language is the national sign language of deaf people in Ghana, descended from American Sign Language. It was introduced in 1957 by Andrew Foster, a deaf African-American missionary, as there had been no education or organizations for the deaf previously. Foster went on to establish the first school for the deaf in Nigeria a few years later, and Nigerian Sign Language shows influence from GSL. GSL is unrelated to indigenous Ghanaian sign languages such as Adamorobe Sign Language and Nanabin Sign Language.

There are currently fourteen schools for the deaf in Ghana, thirteen primary schools and two secondary schools in Ghana, one at Akuapim-Mampong, the other at Navrongo. GSL is supported by the Ghana National Association of the Deaf which has their headquarters in Accra. The Bible Society of Ghana has started translation of the Bible into Ghanaian sign language.

== Indonesian sign languages ==
Indonesian Sign Language (Indonesian: Bahasa Isyarat Indonesia, BISINDO) is any of several related deaf sign languages of Indonesia, at least on the island of Java. It is based on American Sign Language, with local admixture in different cities. Although presented as a coherent language when advocating for recognition by the Indonesian government and use in education, the varieties used in different cities may not be mutually intelligible.

== Jamaican Sign Language ==
Jamaican Sign Language
- JSL
- Native to: Jamaica
- Native speakers: 7,500 (2011)
- Language family: French Sign: American Sign; Jamaican Sign Language

Language codes
- ISO 639-3: jls
- Glottolog: jama1263

Jamaican Sign Language (JSL) is a local variant of American Sign Language used in Jamaica. It is supplanting the indigenous Jamaican Country Sign Language.

== Malaysian Sign Language ==
Malaysian Sign Language (Malay: Bahasa Isyarat Malaysia, or BIM) is the principal language of the deaf community of Malaysia. It is also the official sign language used by the Malaysian government to communicate with the deaf community and was officially recognized by the Malaysian government in 2008 as a means to officially communicate with and among the deaf, particularly on official broadcasts and announcements. BIM has many dialects, differing from state to state.

== Moroccan Sign Language ==
Moroccan Sign Language
- MSL
- Native to: Morocco
- Region: Tetouan
- Native speakers: 63,000 (2008)
- Language family: French Sign: American Sign-based creole?; Moroccan Sign Language

Language codes
- ISO 639-3: xms
- Glottolog: moro1242

Moroccan Sign Language (MSL) is the language of the deaf community of Tetouan and some other cities of Morocco.

American Peace Corps volunteers created Moroccan Sign Language in 1987 in Tetouan from American Sign Language (ASL) and the existing signs; there is less than a 50% lexical similarity with ASL. It is not clear if the 'existing signs' were home sign or an established village sign language. The language is used in three programs for the deaf, but not throughout the country: It is not used in the large cities of Rabat, Tangier, or Casablanca, for example. In Oujda, near the Algerian border, Algerian Sign Language is used, or at least the local sign language has been strongly influenced by it.

== Nigerian Sign Language ==
Nigerian Sign Language
- Native to: Nigeria, Chad, Republic of Congo
- Native speakers: 2,800 (2008) to estimated 48,000–96,000 (2021) in Chad; estimated 600,000–1,000,000 in Nigeria (2021)
- Language family: French Sign: American Sign; Nigerian Sign Language

Language codes
- ISO 639-3: Either: nsi – Nigerian Sign cds – Chadian Sign
- Glottolog: nige1259

Student of Madonna School for Children with Special Needs, Okpanam signing the Nigerian national anthem.

Nigerian Sign Language (NSL) is the national sign language of deaf people in Nigeria. ASL (with a possible mix of Signed English) was introduced in 1960, a few years after Ghanaian Sign Language, by Andrew Foster, a deaf African-American missionary, thereby raising a signing system some scholars have referred to as a dialect of ASL. Deaf education in Nigeria was based on oral method and existing indigenous sign languages were generally regarded as gestural communication prior to Andrew Foster's arrival. The conventional "Nigerian Sign Language" today has been described as the "School Sign Language". There is a Ghanaian influence in NSL; both are based on American Sign Language. The School Sign Language has little relationship with the various Indigenous Nigerian sign languages such as Hausa Sign Language, Yoruba Sign Language, and Bura Sign Language. The Save the Deaf and Endangered Languages Initiative and Nigerian National Association of the Deaf have been working to document indigenous and national varieties of NSL both for research and reference for the Nigerian deaf population.

Chadian and Congolese teachers for the deaf are trained in Nigeria. There are deaf schools in Chad in N’Djamena, Sarh, and Moundou.

== Panamanian Sign Language ==
Panamanian Sign Language
- Lengua de señas panameñas
- Native to: Panama
- Native speakers: 9,000 (2008)
- Language family: French Sign: American Sign; Panamanian Sign Language

Language codes
- ISO 639-3: lsp
- Glottolog: pana1308
- ELP: Panamanian Sign Language

Panamanian Sign Language (Lengua de señas panameñas, LSP) is one of two deaf sign languages of Panama. It derived from American Sign Language and influenced by Salvadoran Sign Language.

See also Chiriqui Sign Language.

== Philippine Sign Language ==
Filipino Sign Language, abbreviated as FSL (Filipino: Wikang Senyas ng mga Pilipino), or Philippine Sign Language, is a sign language originating in the Philippines. Like other sign languages, FSL is a unique language with its own grammar, syntax and morphology; it is not based on and does not resemble Filipino or English. Some researchers consider the indigenous signs of FSL to be at risk of being lost due to the increasing influence of American Sign Language.

== Puerto Rican Sign Language ==
Puerto Rican Sign Language
- Lengua de señas puertorriqueña
- Native to: Puerto Rico
- Ethnicity: 8,000 to 40,000 deaf (1986)
- Native speakers: est. 6,000–13,000 (2021)
- Language family: French Sign: American Sign; Puerto Rican Sign Language

Language codes
- ISO 639-3: psl
- Glottolog: puer1237
- ELP: Puerto Rican Sign Language

Puerto Rican Sign Language (PRSL) is a descendant of American Sign Language used in Puerto Rico and in communities of Puerto Ricans elsewhere, particularly in New York City, with some dialectal differences. ASL was introduced to Puerto Rico in 1907 by Dominican nuns in the San Gabriel School for the Deaf in San Juan. The language is thought to have started diverging shortly after that, around 1910. PRSL has some signs that are related to those in ASL, but used differently, as well as unrelated signs. A major difference between ASL and PRSL are that PRSL doesn't use fingespelling loans from spoken languages; fingerspelling is used only for simple, direct representation of words from written language and without a special rhythm typical to ASL.

== Sierra Leonean Sign Language ==
Sierra Leonean Sign Language
- Native to: Sierra Leone
- Region: Freetown
- Ethnicity: 3,000–5,000 (2008)
- Native speakers: 200 (2008) to est. 23,000–46,000 (2021)
- Language family: French Sign: American Sign; Sierra Leonean Sign Language

Language codes
- ISO 639-3: sgx
- Glottolog: sier1246

Sierra Leonean Sign Language is a variety or descendant of American Sign Language (ASL) used in schools for the deaf in Sierra Leone, or at least in the capital Freetown. As in much of West Africa, the first schools for the deaf were founded by the American missionary Andrew Foster or his students.

== Selangor Sign Language ==
Selangor Sign Language
- Bahasa Isyarat Selangor
- Native to: Malaysia
- Region: Kuala Lumpur and Selangor
- Native speakers: 500 (no date); Mostly elderly, all bilingual in Malaysian Sign
- Language family: French Sign: American Sign, with local mixture; Selangor Sign Language

Language codes
- ISO 639-3: kgi
- Glottolog: sela1253
- ELP: Selangor Sign Language

Selangor Sign Language (SSL), also known as Kuala Lumpur Sign Language (KLSL), is a sign language used in Malaysia. It was originally based on American Sign Language (ASL) but has diverged significantly enough to now be considered a language in its own right. Kuala Lumpur was formerly located in the state of Selangor before it became a federal territory in 1974.

Like Penang Sign Language (PSL), it now mainly used by older people, although many younger people can understand it.

== Singapore Sign Language ==
Singapore Sign Language, or SgSL, is the native sign language used by the deaf and hard of hearing in Singapore, developed over six decades since the establishment of the first school for the Deaf in 1954. Since Singapore's independence in 1965, the Singapore deaf community has had to adapt to many linguistic changes. Today, the local deaf community recognises Singapore Sign Language (SgSL) as a reflection of Singapore's diverse culture. SgSL is influenced by Shanghainese Sign Language (SSL), American Sign Language (ASL), Signing Exact English (SEE-II) and locally developed signs.

== Thai Sign Language ==
Thai Sign Language (TSL; Thai: ภาษามือไทย, romanized: P̣hās̄ʹā mụ̄x thịy), or Modern Standard Thai Sign Language (MSTSL), is the national sign language of Thailand's deaf community and is used in most parts of the country by the 20 percent of the estimated 56,000 pre-linguistically deaf people who go to school.

== See also ==
- Black American Sign Language – Dialect of American Sign Language

== Bibliography ==
- Dalle, Sophie (1996–1997). Rapport de Stage: La language de signes au Congo (PDF) (Report) (in French). Archived from the original (PDF) on 21 October 2004.
- Garay, S. (2004). Understanding the Panama Deaf Community & Sign Language: Lengua de Señas Panameñas (Instructional CD). Asociación Nacional de Sordos de Panamá.
- Garay, S. (1990). Panama's sign language dictionary: Lengua de señas panameñas. Asociación Nacional de Sordos de Panamá.
- Kamei, Nobutaka, ed. (2008). Langue des Signes d'Afrique Francophone (LSAF) (DVD). Fuchu: Research Institute for Languages and Cultures of Asia and Africa, Tokyo University of Foreign Studies.
- Tamomo, Serge (1994). Le language des signes du sourd Africain Francophone. Cotonou, Bénin: PEFISS.
