= Chiangmai Sign Language =

Secondary sign language of Thailand

- Native to: Chiang Mai Thailand
- Region: metro Chiang Mai
- Native speakers: 19 (2015)
- Language family: Chiangmai–Bangkok Sign

Language codes
- ISO 639-3: csd
- Glottolog: chia1237
- ELP: Original Chiangmai Sign Language

Chiangmai Sign Language (also known as Old or Original Chiangmai Sign Language) is a deaf-community sign language of Thailand that arose among deaf people who migrated to Chiang Mai for work or family. The language is moribund, with all speakers born before 1960. Younger generations have switched to Thai Sign Language.
