= Vietnamese sign languages =

Group of sign languages spoken in Vietnam

Vietnamese Sign
- Ngôn ngữ ký hiệu Việt Nam
- Geographic distribution: Vietnam
- Linguistic classification: deaf-community sign languages; possibly related to other sign languages of SE Asia
- Subdivisions: Haiphong Sign; Hanoi Sign; Saigon Sign

Language codes
- Glottolog: viet1253 Vietnamese Sign haho1238 Ha-Hoic

The three deaf-community sign languages indigenous to Vietnam are found in Ho Chi Minh City, Hanoi, and Haiphong. The HCMC and Hanoi languages especially have been influenced by the French Sign Language (LSF) once taught in schools, and have absorbed a large amount of LSF vocabulary.

The Vietnamese languages are part of a sign language area that includes indigenous sign languages of Laos and Thailand, though it is not known if they are genealogically related to each other. The influence of LSF may have obscured the links: the highest cognacy is with Haiphong Sign, which has been the least influenced by LSF.

There are attempts to develop a national standard language, Vietnamese Sign Language (Vietnamese: Ngôn ngữ ký hiệu Việt Nam).

== See also ==
- Haiphong Sign Language
- Old Chiangmai–Bangkok Sign Language family
- Vietnamese Braille
