= Chiriqui Sign Language =

Deaf sign language of Panama

- Native to: Panama
- Region: Chiriquí
- Language family: related to Panamanian Sign Language?

Language codes
- ISO 639-3: None (mis)
- Glottolog: chir1296
- ELP: Chiriqui Sign Language

Chiriqui Sign Language (Spanish: Lengua de Señas de Chiriquí, LSCH) is the principal deaf sign language of the province of Chiriquí in Panama. It's not clear if it's related to Panamanian Sign Language, which is not mutually intelligible with it; if so, it would also be related to American Sign Language.
