= Old Bangkok Sign Language =

Moribund sign language of Thailand

Bangkok Sign Language
- ภาษามือกรุงเทพเก่า
- Native to: Thailand
- Region: metro Bangkok
- Native speakers: (moribund)
- Language family: Chiangmai–Bangkok Sign

Language codes
- ISO 639-3: None (mis)
- Glottolog: oldb1247
- ELP: Original Bangkok Sign Language
- IETF: csd-u-sd-th10

Bangkok Sign Language (also known as Old or Original Bangkok Sign Language; Thai: ภาษามือกรุงเทพเก่า, romanized: P̣hās̄ʹā mụ̄x krungtheph kèā) is a deaf-community sign language of Thailand that arose among deaf people who migrated to Bangkok for work or family. The language is moribund, with all speakers born before 1960. Younger generations have switched to Thai Sign Language, which seems to have arisen as a mixture of Old Bangkok SL and American Sign Language.
