= Deaf-community sign language =

Common language created by deaf people

A deaf-community or urban sign language is a sign language that emerges when deaf people who do not have a common language come together and form a community. This may be a formal situation, such as the establishment of a school for deaf students, or informal, such as migration to cities for employment and the subsequent gathering of deaf people for social purposes. An example of the first is Nicaraguan Sign Language, which emerged when deaf children in Nicaragua were brought together for the first time, and received only oral education; of the latter, Bamako Sign Language, which emerged among the tea circles of the uneducated deaf in the capital of Mali. Nicaraguan SL is now a language of instruction and is recognized as the national sign language; Bamako SL is not, and is threatened by the use of American Sign Language in schools for the deaf.

Deaf-community sign languages contrast with village sign language in that they tend to be used only by the deaf, at least at first, and most communication is between deaf people. Village sign languages, on the other hand, develop in relatively isolated areas with high incidences of congenital deafness, where most hearing people have deaf family, so that most signers are hearing. These differences have linguistic consequences. Urban deaf communities lack the common knowledge and social context that enables village signers to communicate without being verbally explicit. Deaf-community signers need to communicate with strangers, and therefore must be more explicit; it is thought this may have the effect of developing or at least speeding up the development of grammatical and other linguistic structures in the emerging language. For example, only deaf-community sign languages are known to make abstract and grammatical use of sign space. Both types of deaf sign language differ from speech-taboo languages such as the various Aboriginal Australian sign languages, which are developed by the hearing community and only used secondarily by the deaf, and are not independent languages.

Deaf-community languages may develop directly from home sign, or perhaps from idioglossic sign (in families with more than one deaf child), as was the case with Nicaraguan SL, or they may develop from village sign languages, as appears to have been at least partially the case with American SL, which arose in a school for the deaf where French Sign Language was the language of instruction, but seems to have derived largely from two or three village sign languages of the students.

== Languages ==
Once a sign language is established, especially if it is a language of education, it may spread and spawn additional languages, such as in the French Sign Language family. The following are languages thought to have been established in new deaf communities, without the direct transmission of an existing sign language. There are presumably others; with many sign languages, we have no records of how they formed.

- American Sign Language (school sign; village sign with significant input from FSL)
- Bamako Sign Language (urban)
- British Sign Language (urban→school)
- Chinese Sign Language (school)
- Far North Queensland Indigenous Sign Language (Cairns and points north)
- German Sign Language (urban)
- Hausa Sign Language (urban)
- Indo-Pakistani Sign Language
- Israeli Sign Language
- Japanese Sign Language (school?)
- Lyons Sign Language (urban)
- Mbour Sign Language (urban)
- Nicaraguan Sign Language (school sign)
- Old French Sign Language (urban)
- Qahveh Khaneh Sign Language (urban)
- Sri Lankan sign languages (school sign, fourteen languages)
- Thai Sign Language (urban sign with significant input from ASL)
- Tibetan Sign Language (standardization of several community languages)
- Tanzanian sign languages (school sign, seven languages)
- Venezuelan Sign Language

Other locally developed sign languages which may have formed this way are:

- In Africa: Burkina Sign Language, the various Ethiopian sign languages, Guinea-Bissau Sign Language, Kenyan Sign Language, Libyan Sign Language, Maroua Sign Language, the various Sudanese sign languages, Ugandan Sign Language, Zambian Sign Language, Zimbabwean Sign Language
- In the Americas: Brazilian Sign Language, Colombian Sign Language, Ecuadorian Sign Language, Jamaican Country Sign Language, Peruvian Sign Language, Chiriqui Sign Language
- In Asia: Old Bangkok Sign Language, Old Chiangmai Sign Language, Penang Sign Language, Hanoi Sign Language, Saigon Sign Language, Haiphong Sign Language, Yogyakarta Sign Language, Nepalese Sign Language, Kurdish Sign Language
- In Europe: Catalan Sign Language, Spanish Sign Language, Swiss German Sign Language, Swedish Sign Language

== See also ==
- List of sign languages
- Village sign language
