= Fransaskois =

Francophone residents of Saskatchewan, Canada

Total population
- French ethnicity: 125,810 (2016); Francophones: 17,735 (2016)

Regions with significant populations
- Francophones in Saskatchewan
- Central Saskatchewan: 5,225 (2016)
- Southern Saskatchewan: 4,290 (2016)
- Saskatoon: 4,025 (2016)
- Regina: 3,105 (2016)
- Prince Albert: 1,040 (2016)
- Northern Saskatchewan: 140 (2016)

Languages
- Canadian French · Canadian English · Franglais

Related ethnic groups
- French Canadians (Acadians · Franco-Albertan · Franco-Columbian · Franco-Manitoban · Franco-Ontarian · Franco-Newfoundlander · Franco-Ténois · Franco-Yukonnais · Québécois) · French · French Americans · Métis

Fransaskois (pronounced [fʁɑ̃.sas.kwa]; cf. Québécois), Franco-Saskatchewanais (pronounced [fʁɑ̃.ko.sas.ka.tʃə.wa.nɛ]) or Franco-Saskatchewanians are French Canadians or Canadian francophones living in the province of Saskatchewan. According to the 2016 Canadian Census, approximately 17,735 residents (about 1.5%) of the province stated that French was their mother tongue. In the same census, 125,810 (about 11%) Saskatchewanians claimed full or partial French ancestry. There are several Fransaskois communities in Saskatchewan, although the majority of francophones in Saskatchewan reside in the province's three largest cities, Saskatoon, Regina, and Prince Albert.

The first francophones to enter the region were French Canadian coureurs des bois employed in the North American fur trade during the 18th century. Francophone settlement into the region first occurred with French Canadian fur traders, along with Roman Catholic missionaries, and the Métis, during the mid 19th century. In 1885, a rebellion that included the French-speaking Métis broke out in the region. In the early 20th century, the provincial government attempted to assimilate the francophone minority into the anglophone majority by curtailing French language education in Saskatchewan. The enactment of the Canadian Charter of Rights and Freedoms in 1982 resulted in several decisions from the Supreme Court of Canada, that reaffirmed the educational, and judicial rights of the francophones in Saskatchewan.

== Demographics ==
According to the 2016 Canadian Census, the number of people that reported French was their mother tongue in Saskatchewan was 17,735, or approximately 1.6 per cent of the population. French is the most common mother tongue in the province after English, Tagalog, German, and Cree (including Cree languages not otherwise specified). The majority of francophone Saskatchewanians are bilingual in English and French, with only 530 Fransaskois reporting they only had proficiency in French. There were 51,355 Saskatchewanians, approximately 4.7 per cent of the population, that reported being bilingual in both English and French; although the following figure includes francophone residents of the province, and Saskatchewanian who speak French as a second language.

Approximately 56 per cent of Fransaskois were born in Saskatchewan, with 29 per cent of francophones in the province born in another province or territory of Canada. Approximately 16 per cent of all francophones in Saskatchewan were born outside Canada. Among the Fransaskois that were born outside Canada, approximately 57 per cent originated from Africa, 22 per cent from Europe, 18 per cent from Asia, and 6 per cent from all other countries in the Americas.

In the 2016 census, 125,810 Saskatchewanians reported having partial or full French ancestry. French is the seventh most commonly reported ethnic group in Saskatchewan, after German, Canadian, English, Scottish, Irish, and Ukrainian.

=== Communities ===
Francophones in Saskatchewan are concentrated along three main areas of the province, the North and South Saskatchewan River, and in southern Saskatchewan. The majority of Fransaskois reside around the province's largest cities, with three out of four Fransaskois' residing in Saskatoon, Regina, and Prince Albert. However, smaller communities of Fransaskois are also based in Gravelbourg, Albertville, Duck Lake, Zenon Park, Bellegarde, and St. Isidore-de-Bellevue.

== History ==
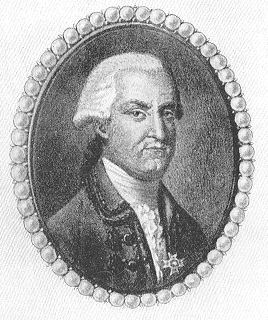
Louis de la Corne, c. 1750. In 1755, he was appointed the commandant of New France's poste de l’Ouest, which included present day Saskatchewan

In 1752, Louis de la Corne, Chevalier de la Corne was appointed commandant poste de l’Ouest. He embarked on an expedition along the northern coast of Lake Superior, through Fort Paskoya (Le Pas, Manitoba) and into what is today the province of Saskatchewan establishing Fort Saint-Louis, or what became known as Fort-à-la-Corne, near the forks of the Saskatchewan River. The area was the westernmost region of New France.

=== 19th century ===
French Canadian coureurs de bois continued to utilize the territory after the British conquest of New France, in their pursuit of furs to trade with the Hudson's Bay Company (HBC) and the North-West Company. A number of French fur traders often had local First Nations women as their companions. While the majority of these couples were not formally married, the offspring that they produced often carried the French names of their fathers. Names like Dumont, Cardinal, Breland and Vandal are often associated with the French Métis. Between 1840 and 1880, several Métis communities developed in Batoche, Île-à-la-Crosse, St. Laurent de Grandin, and Willow Bunch.

In addition to French Canadian fur traders, and the Métis, Roman Catholic missionaries were among the first francophone settlers into the region, with several French missionaries dispatched to Qu'Appelle River valley (near present-day Fort Qu'Appelle in the early 19th century.

After the two fur trading companies were united in 1821, the French Métis settled along the Red River in Rupert's Land, until the Deed of Surrender transferred the territory to Canada in 1870. As a result of the sale, a number of Métis left the Red River to seek out new lands in an attempt to return to their way of life. The vast majority landed on the banks of the Saskatchewan River in the area of Batoche and Duck Lake, although a dispute over land titles resulted in the North-West Rebellion; which saw the Métis eventually defeated at the Battle of Batoche in 1885 when. The rebellion's leader, Louis Riel was later tried in court, the outcome of which became a major point of contention between English and French Canadians.

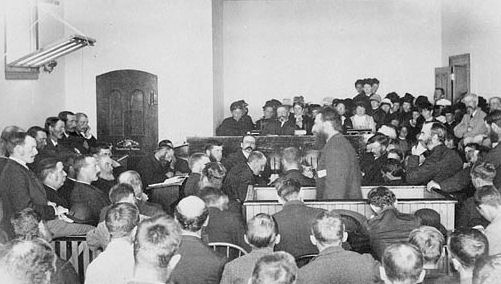
Louis Riel standing trial in 1885. The outcome of the trial became a point of contention for French Canadians.

In 1892, the Northwest Territories abolished French as an official language.

=== 20th century ===
At the end of the 19th century, the Roman Catholic Church aided the government in bringing new groups of immigrants to the prairies. The resulting immigration saw many arrive from Quebec who began establishing towns, schools, churches and businesses. The Canadian government worked to encourage French immigrants from France and Belgium, achieving some success in 1912 and 1913 as some 3,000 French arrived in Canada in those two years.

At the turn of the century, the French-speaking settlers represented about 2.9% of the population. Five years after the foundation of the province of Saskatchewan in 1905, the French-speaking population represented 5.2%. The population grew from 2,600 to 25,000 in the first ten years of the twentieth century, and they would double their population during next two decades.

The French Canadians arriving in Saskatchewan were mostly farmers interested in developing the agricultural landscape of the province. Others worked to ensure the survival of the Catholic Church and the French language in the province. The first bishops of the west were French Canadians who believed that the survival of the Church was dependent on the survival of the mother tongue. In February 1912, 450 members of the Francophone community of Saskatchewan met at Duck Lake to form a provincial organization called La Sociéte du Parler Français de la Saskatchewan. Invited delegates included Bishop Mathieu of Regina, Bishop Charlebois of Keewatin and the Attorney General Alphonse Turgeon. Later that year the society would go on to form the Association Franco-Canadienne de la Saskatchewan (renamed the Assemblée communautaire fransaskoise of ACF in 1999) in an effort to protect the rights of Fransaskois.

The early 20th century saw efforts to curtail French language education, in an effort to assimilate the francophone minority with the anglophone majority. In 1916, several provincial organizations like the Saskatchewan Grain Growers, the Saskatchewan School Trustees’ Association and the Saskatchewan Association of Rural Municipalities resolved to forbid the use of foreign languages in Saskatchewan's schools. Premier William Martin drafted an amendment to Section 177 of the School Act which limited French instruction to one hour a day. In response to the loss of the right to teach French in a public school in 1918, Franco-Catholic school trustees formed the Association des commissaries d’écoles franco-canadiens (ACEFC). In 1918, Monsignor Mathieu Regina opened College Mathieu in Gravelbourg, a private institution that offered classical education in French. College Mathieu remained the only option for a French education in Saskatchewan for the next 75 years. It remained in operation as Western Canada's only private French language secondary school until 2003, when it was absorbed by the province's public francophone school system and renamed L'école Secondaire Collège Mathieu.

In 1982, Section 23 of the Canadian Charter of Rights and Freedoms guaranteed minority education rights. The establishment of the Charter led to the Fransaskois community pushing for further linguistic rights through the judiciary. In 1988, the Supreme Court of Canada ruled in R v Mercure that the North-West Territories Act still applied to its succeeding provinces (Alberta and Saskatchewan), notably Section 110, which affords certain linguistic rights to francophones. However, the court also stated in its decision that said provinces were also permitted to legislate on matters of official languages, resulting in the passage of the Languages Act in Alberta, and The Language Act in Saskatchewan. Although both laws affirmed the right to use French in the judiciary and legislature, they also revoked many of the privileges accorded to francophones under the North-West Territories Act. Another Supreme Court decision (Mahe decision) in 1990 recognized the Fransaskois’ right to control their children’s education.

=== 21st century ===
In 2003, the provincial government introduced its first policy on French-language support for certain provincial services. The year 2012 was proclaimed the Year of the Fransaskois Community in Saskatchewan by Minister Donna Harpauer in recognition of the 100th anniversary of the ACF.

== Politics ==
The Francophone Affairs Branch (established as the Office of French Language Coordination) was established by the provincial government in 1990, and serves as the liaison between the provincial government and the Fransaskois community. Conversely, Fransaskois interests are represented by the Assemblée communautaire fransaskoise. The ACF originated from the Association Franco-Canadienne de la Saskatchewan, formed in 1912. The organization was renamed as the Association Catholique Franco-Canadienne in 1913. The association dropped the word "catholique" in favour of "culturelle" in 1962. The organization adopted the name "L’Association Communautaire Fransaskoise" in 1999, to further reflect the structural makeup of the organization. The ACF's mandate is to represent the Fransaskois community in order to promote services protecting their rights.

=== Access ===
Under the provincial Languages Act passed in 1988, English serves as the official language of the province. English is the primary language of the Legislative Assembly of Saskatchewan, with legislation passed there permitted to be published in English only. However, the Languages Act does allow legislation to be published bilingually in English and French; and permits its members to address the legislature in the French language. Although the Languages Act permits the use of French in the legislature, it revoked many of the linguistic rights previously guaranteed to Fransaskois under Section 110 of the North-West Territories Act.

French is one of two official languages used in the provincial judiciary. The rights of francophones for the provincial judicial system was outlined in An Act Respecting the Use of the English and French Languages in Saskatchewan, passed in 1988 shortly after the Supreme Court decision on R v Mercure.

== Education ==
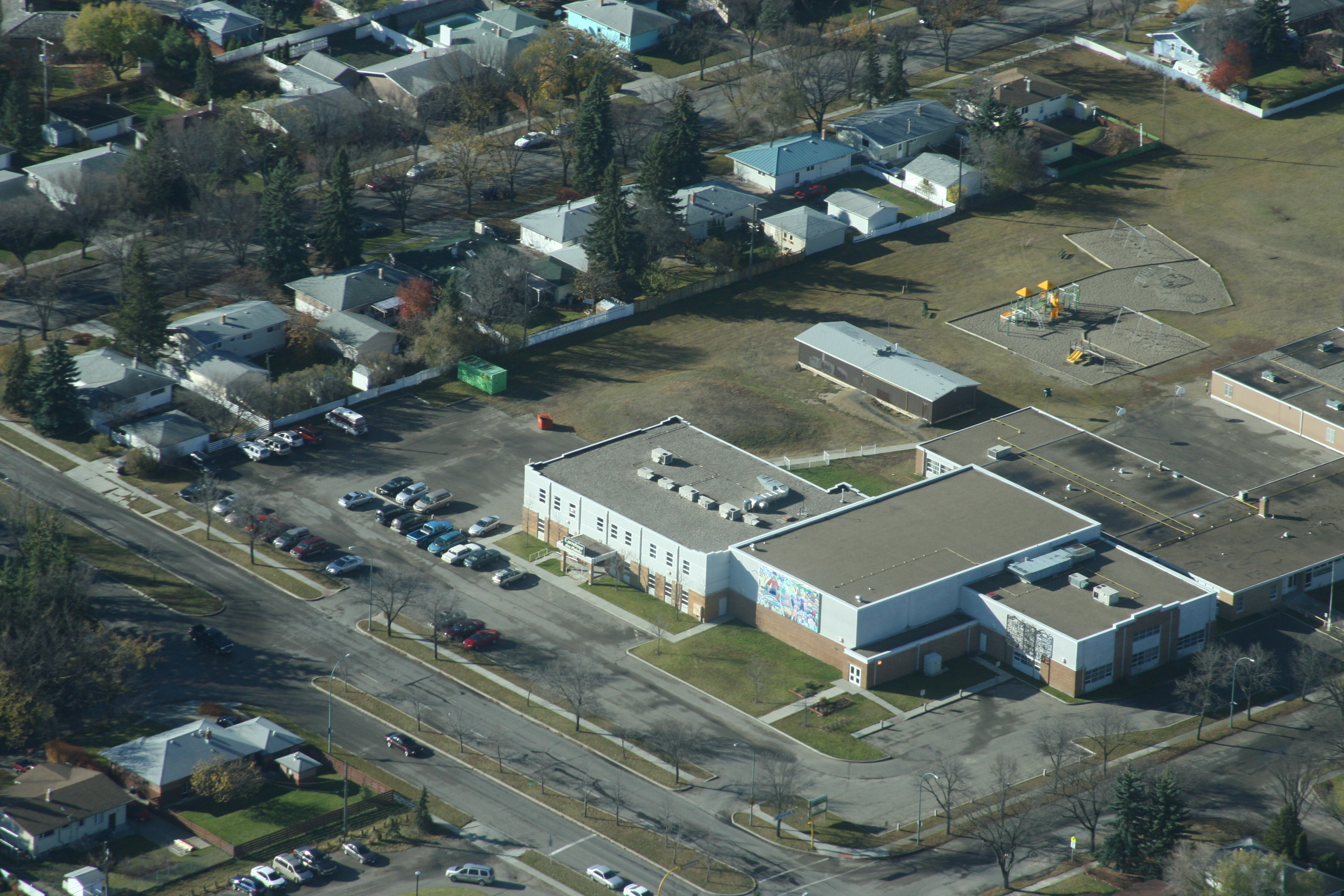
Aerial view of École monseigneur de Laval's elementary school building. The school is one of 12 elementary schools administered by the Conseil des écoles fransaskoises.

French language education rights for minority francophone populations in Canada is guaranteed under Section 23 of the Canadian Charter of Rights and Freedoms, and is further reinforced by the province's Education Act. The Conseil des écoles fransaskoises is the province's only francophone school division, and encompasses the entire province. The francophone school board operates twelve elementary schools and two secondary schools; with a total enrolment of 1,603 students during the 2015–16 academic year.

There are no publicly-funded francophone post-secondary institutions in Saskatchewan. However, the University of Regina operates a bilingual English and French institution, La Cité universitaire francophone. The institution operates as a centre that provides a limited number of academic programs in the French-language, as well as some francophone services for the university.

=== History ===
Education in the French language occurred in the region as early as the 19th century, although saw efforts to curtail its instruction in the early 20th century. In 1911, the provincial government limited French language education was to Grade 1 of elementary school; before outright banning its instruction in 1931. Elementary school teachers were again permitted to teach the French language after an amendment to the provincial Education Act was enacted in 1968, allowing teachers to teach the language. Teachers in secondary school were permitted to teach French in 1971. Provisions made to the provincial Education Act in 1978 allowed for designated schools to use French as their primary language of instruction. Although these schools were open to francophones, they were administered by anglophone school boards, typically as French immersion schools.

Following the enactment of the Canadian Charter of Rights and Freedoms, Fransaskois have pushed for the right to administer their own schools. Decisions passed by the Supreme Court in 1988 and 1990 asserted the fact that francophones the right to govern their own education. However, a separate public francophone school system was not implemented in the province until 1993. The province established eight public francophone school boards in 1995, all of which were eventually consolidated into the Conseil scolaire fransaskois in 1999.

== Culture ==
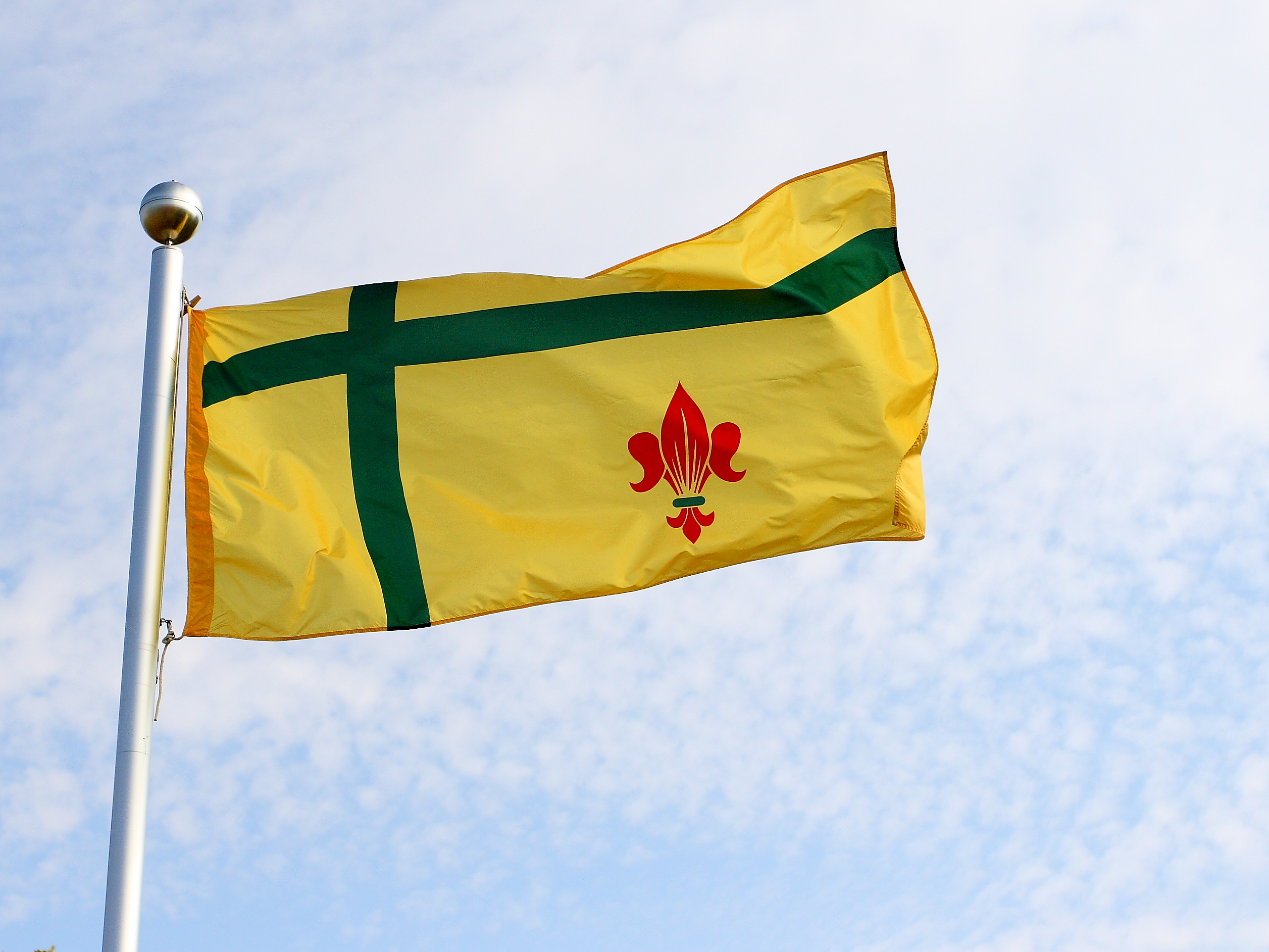
Flag of the Fransaskois

The Conseil culturel fransaskois was established in 1974 as an organization that assists francophone cultural centres in the province. The organization is responsible for popularizing the term Fransaskois to refer to the French Canadian community in Saskatchewan. Fransaskois celebrate their vibrant culture regularly. Folk arts, visual arts, fine arts and performance arts all feature prominently in their festivals. The Fête fransaskoise festival is an annual francophone arts and culture festival held in June. The festival has been held since 1980, it has been an opportunity for Fransaskois to get together, express themselves and celebrate in French for a weekend and to preserve their roots.

A French-language professional theatre company, La Troupe du Jour, founded in 1987, operates from a base in Saskatoon. Gravelbourg's Fransaskois community is the subject of a short documentary Les Fransaskois, produced for the documentary series The Grasslands Project.

The Fransaskois flag was created in 1979 to represent the community. The flag features a green cross on a field of yellow, with a red fleur-de-lis on the bottom right of the flag. The green represents both the boreal forest and the historic role of the Roman Catholic Church within the community; the yellow representing the Canadian Prairies; and the red fleur-de-lis representing Louis Riel's struggle for francophone and Métis rights.

== Media ==
=== Print ===
In 1910, a province-wide, French-language weekly "Le Patriote de l'Ouest" was established in the town of Duck Lake. In 1941, "Le Patriote de l'Ouest" merged with "La Liberté" a French-language weekly newspaper based in Saint-Boniface Manitoba, becoming "La Liberté et le Patriote". In 1971, "L'Eau vive" became the new French-language weekly in Saskatchewan. L'Eau vive, is published in Regina.

Two community newspapers, Triangle News in Coronach and the Gravelbourg Tribune in Gravelbourg, publish content in both English and French.

=== Radio ===
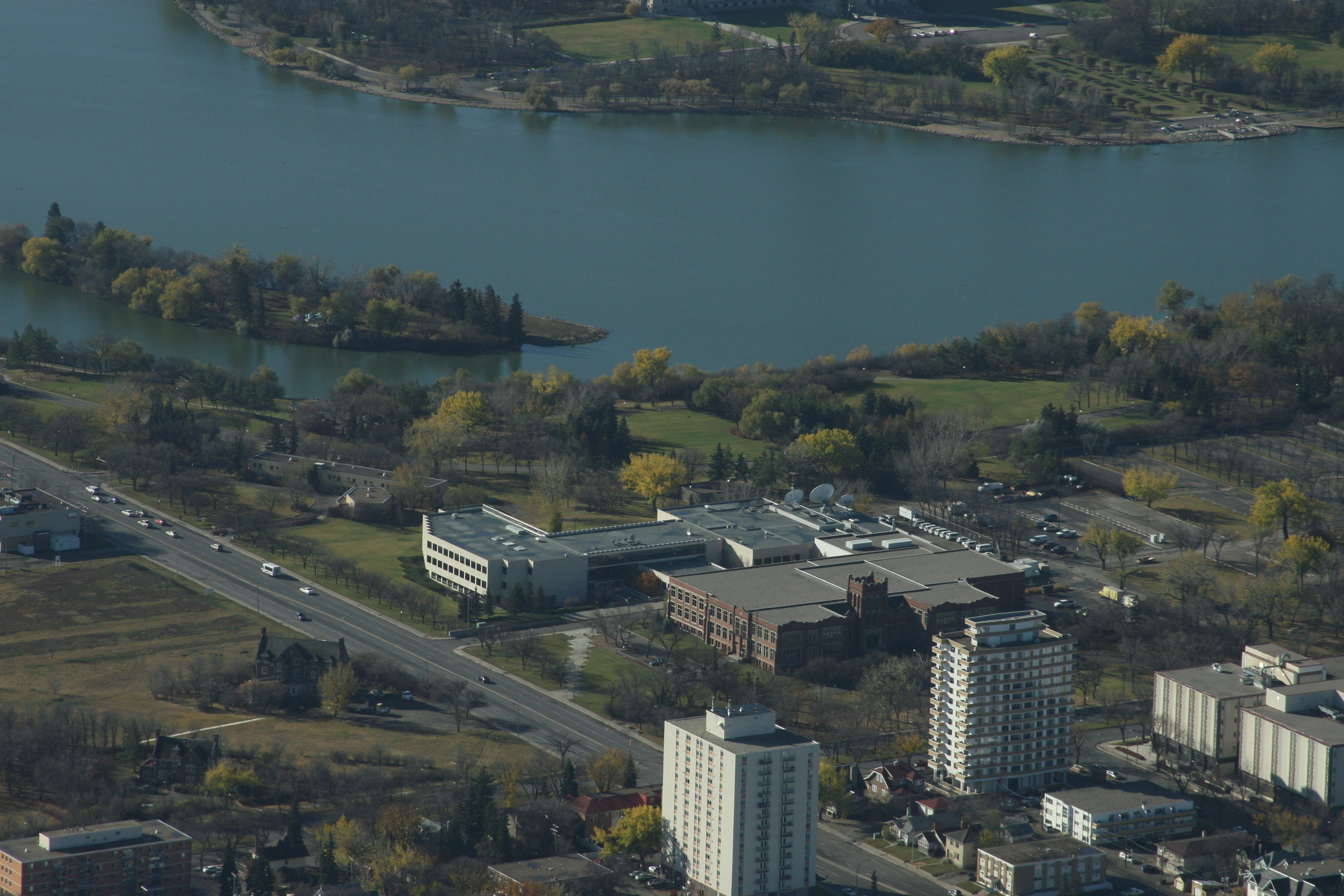
The CBC/Radio-Canada building in Regina houses studios for two francophone radio stations, CBKFT-DT, and CBKF-FM

The Fransaskois community is served primarily by the radio and television services of Radio-Canada, the country's French language public broadcaster. Radio-Canada launched its French language first television station in Saskatchewan in 1976. Ici Radio-Canada Télé's CBKFT-DT and Ici Radio-Canada Première's CBKF-FM are based in Regina and have rebroadcasters throughout the province, while Regina and Saskatoon receive Ici Musique service from rebroadcasters of CKSB-FM in Winnipeg.

A privately owned bilingual community radio station, CKZP-FM, also operates in Zenon Park. In 2003, a privately owned community station, CFRG-FM, was launched in Gravelbourg by a new community group which has no ownership affiliation with the original CFRG. The original CFRG was one of two privately owned French language radio stations that operated in Saskatchewan prior to 1973. Programming at CFRG started in June 1952 at CFRG Gravelbourg; whereas the second station, CFNS, started broadcasting in November 1952 in Saskatoon. In 1973, Radio-Canada bought the two stations and has since taken a leading role in broadcasting French-language radio and French-language television across the province, featuring locally produced content in both mediums. The two radio stations became rebroadcasters of CBKF after their acquisition. Also included in this French language network are CBKF 860 kHz AM, Saskatoon, and CBKF-1 690 kHz AM Gravelbourg.

== Notable Fransaskois ==
The most famous Fransaskoise, Jeanne Sauvé, born in Prud'Homme, served as a Liberal MP, Cabinet minister, Speaker of the House of Commons and ultimately Governor General of Canada. Another politician having Fransaskois heritage is Pierre Poilievre, who as of October 2023 is an MP serving as Leader of the Conservative Party and leader of the Official Opposition; Poilievre's adoptive father Donald was Fransaskois and their household was bilingual. In the arts, notable Fransaskois include sculptor Joe Fafard, folk music bands La Raquette à Claquettes and Hart-Rouge, and children's entertainer Carmen Campagne (from the town of Willow Bunch). New upcoming artists such as Alexis Normand, Véronique Poulin and Shawn Jobin are becoming staples on the Fransaskois music scene, joining more established artists such as Annette Campagne, Chritianne Blondeau and Michel Lalonde. In sports, the most notable Fransaskois is NHL games-played record holder, Patrick Marleau, and Colorado Avalanche forward Blake Comeau of Meadow Lake. Comeau was a member of the 2004 Memorial Cup champion Kelowna Rockets and of two gold medal-winning World Junior Hockey championship teams.

== See also ==
- French Canadians
  - Acadians, French-speaking Quebecer, Franco-Albertan, Franco-Columbian, Franco-Manitoban, Franco-Newfoundlander, Franco-Ontarian, Franco-Ténois, Franco-Yukonnais
- Southbranch Settlement
