= L'Aquilon =

Canadian newspaper

L'Aquilon is a Canadian weekly community newspaper, which serves the Franco-Ténois community in the Northwest Territories. The newspaper, which publishes 1,000 copies every Friday, operates from offices in Yellowknife and Hay River.

L'Aquilon was first established in 1986. In 2000, the newspaper was part of a consortium which sued the territorial government over its lack of support for French language institutions.

In 2021, the paper's publisher merged with CIVR-FM, a francophone community radio station branded as Radio Taïga. The merger brought both outlets under the management of a new organization, Médias Ténois. The organization also collaborates with the Yukon-based francophone newspaper L'Aurore boréale and the Nunavut-based francophone media outlets CFRT-FM and Le Nunavoix in Articles de l'Arctique, a wire service which distributes the outlets' content about news in the Canadian Arctic to other francophone media outlets in Canada.
