= French language in Canada =

French is the mother tongue of approximately 7.8 million Canadians (19.6 percent of the Canadian population, second to English at 54.9 percent) according to the 2021 Canadian census. Under the 1969 Official Languages Act, French is recognized as an official language of Canada alongside English and both have equal status at the federal government level. Most native Francophones in Canada live in Quebec, the only province where French is the majority and the sole official language. In 2016, 29.8 percent of Canadians reported being able to conduct a conversation in French; this number drops to 10.3 percent of Canadians when excluding Quebec, since most of Canada outside this territory is Anglophone.

In Quebec, 85 percent of residents are native francophones and 95 percent speak French as their first or second language. About one million native francophones live in other provinces, most notably the neighbouring province of New Brunswick, where about a third of its residents are francophones; New Brunswick is Canada's only officially bilingual province in full. There is also a large community in Ontario, mainly concentrated in Quebec-bordering regions to the east of Ottawa and in Northeastern Ontario. In Ontario French has official status in the courts and in education. Elsewhere in Canada, there are pockets of smaller francophone communities throughout including in Manitoba (notably the St. Boniface neighbourhood), Alberta, Saskatchewan, and the Maritime provinces of Nova Scotia and Prince Edward Island.

The language is mainly spoken by Canadians of French descent (most notably the Québécois and the Acadians, with varying dialects), a legacy of the French colonization of America, and these communities maintain a distinct society and culture from the mainly anglophone rest of Canada. Outside of Quebec, where otherwise English is the de facto working language, francophone minority communities retain the right to French-language primary and secondary education as guaranteed by Section 23 of the Canadian Charter of Rights and Freedoms. They also, in most territories, retain official rights for provincial level French-language services and institutions through constitutional provisions (Manitoba and New Brunswick) or statutory provisions in the legal system (Alberta, Ontario, Saskatchewan, Northwest Territories, Nunavut, and Yukon). French speakers in Canada have been the subject of linguistic discrimination and have historically faced subjugation through laws such as Regulation 17. This has led to sometimes uneasy relations with the anglophone Canadian majority.

== History and evolution ==
=== 16th century ===
In 1524, the Florentine navigator Giovanni da Verrazzano, working for Italian bankers in France, explored the American coast from Florida to Cape Breton Island. In 1529, Verrazzano mapped a part of the coastal region of the North American continent under the name Nova Gallia (New France). In 1534, King Francis I of France sent Jacques Cartier to explore previously unfamiliar lands. Cartier found the Gulf of Saint Lawrence, sealed an alliance with the local people and obtained passage to go farther. During his second expedition (1535–1536), Cartier came upon the Saint Lawrence River, a path into the heart of the continent. However, Cartier failed to establish a permanent colony in the area, and war in Europe kept France from further colonization through the end of the 16th century.

=== 17th century ===
At the beginning of the 17th century, French settlements and private companies were established in the area that is now eastern Canada. In 1605, Pierre Dugua with Samuel de Champlain founded Port Royal (Acadia), and in 1608, Champlain founded Quebec City. In 1642, the foundation of Ville Marie, the settlement that would eventually become Montreal, completed the occupation of the territory.

In 1634, Quebec contained 200 settlers who were principally involved in the fur trade. The trade was profit-making and the city was on the point of becoming more than a mere temporary trading post.

In 1635, Jesuits founded the secondary school of Quebec for the education of children. In 1645, the Compagnie des Habitants was created, uniting the political and economic leaders of the colony. French was the language of all the non-native people.

In 1685, the revocation of the Edict of Nantes by Louis XIV (1654–1715), which had legalized freedom of religion of the Reformed Church, caused the emigration from France of 300,000 Huguenots (French Calvinists) to other countries of Europe and to North America.

=== 18th century ===
With the Treaty of Utrecht in 1713, the British began their domination of eastern North America, some parts of which had been controlled by the French. The British took mainland Nova Scotia in 1713. Present-day Maine fell to the British during Father Rale's War, while present-day New Brunswick fell after Father Le Loutre's War. In 1755 the majority of the French-speaking inhabitants of Nova Scotia were deported to the Thirteen Colonies. After 1758, they were deported to England and France. The Treaty of Paris (1763) completed the British takeover, removing France from Canadian territory, except for Saint Pierre and Miquelon at the entrance of the Gulf of Saint Lawrence.

The French language was relegated to second rank as far as trade and state communications were concerned. Out of necessity, the educated class learned the English language and became progressively bilingual, but the great majority of the French-speaking inhabitants continued to speak only French, and their population increased. Anglicization of the French population failed, and it became obvious that coexistence was required. In 1774, Parliament passed the Quebec Act, restoring French civil laws and abrogating the Test Act, which had been used to suppress Catholicism.

=== Canada as a federal state ===
In 1791, Parliament repealed the Quebec Act and gave the king authority to divide the Canadian colony into two new provinces: Upper Canada, which later became Ontario, and Lower Canada, which became Quebec.

In 1867, three colonies of British North America agreed to form a federal state, which was named Canada. It was composed of four provinces:

- Ontario, formerly Upper Canada
- Quebec, formerly Lower Canada
- Nova Scotia
- New Brunswick, former Acadian territory

In Quebec, French became again the official language; until then it was the vernacular language but with no legal status.

== Dialects and varieties ==
As a consequence of geographical seclusion and as a result of British conquest, the French language in Canada presents three different but related main dialects. They share certain features that distinguish them from European French.

All of these dialects mix, to varying degrees, elements from regional languages and folk dialects spoken in France at the time of colonization. For instance, the origins of Quebec French lie in 17th- and 18th-century Parisian French, influenced by folk dialects of the early modern period and other regional languages (such as Norman, Picard and Poitevin-Saintongeais) that French colonists had brought to New France. The three dialects can also be historically and geographically associated with three of the five former colonies of New France – Canada, Acadia and Terre-Neuve (Newfoundland) – which were settled by people from different regions of France.

In addition, there is a mixed language known as Michif, which is based on Cree and French. It is spoken by Métis communities in Manitoba and Saskatchewan as well as within adjacent areas of the United States.

Immigration after World War II has brought francophone immigrants from around the world, and with them other French dialects.

== Francophones across Canada ==
Francophone Canadians or French-speaking Canadians are citizens of Canada who speak French, and sometimes refers only to those who speak it as their first language. In 2021, 10,669,575 people in Canada or 29.2% of the total population spoke French, including 7,651,360 people or 20.8% who declared French as their mother tongue.

=== Distribution ===
Approximately 98 percent of Canadians can speak either or both English and French:

Six million French-speaking Canadians reside in Quebec, where they constitute the main linguistic group, and another one million reside in other Canadian regions. The largest portion of Francophones outside Quebec live in Ontario, followed by New Brunswick, but they can be found in all provinces and territories. The presence of French in Canada comes mainly from French colonization in America that occurred in the 16th to 18th centuries.

Francophones in Canada are not all of French Canadian or French descent, particularly in the English-speaking provinces of Ontario and Western Canada. A few Canadians of French Canadian or French origin are also not Francophone.

Unlike Francophones in Quebec, who generally identify simply as Québécois, Francophones outside Quebec generally identify as Francophone Canadians (e.g. Franco-Ontarians, Franco-Manitobans, etc.), the exception being Acadians, who constitute their own cultural group and live in Acadia, in the Maritime provinces. New Brunswick is Canada's only officially-bilingual province. All three territories (the Yukon, the Northwest Territories, and Nunavut) include French among their official languages.

Number of francophones by province and territory in Canada (2016)
Province/territory	Group name	Principal regions	French as mother tongue	Percentage
Quebec	Québécois	Regions of Quebec	8,214,000	85%
Ontario	Franco-Ontarians	Sudbury / Northeastern Ontario, Ottawa / Eastern Ontario, and a number of Francophone communities throughout Ontario	561,160	4.4%
New Brunswick	Acadians & Brayons	Madawaska County, Restigouche County, Gloucester County, Kent County, Westmorland County	234,410	31.6%
Alberta	Franco-Albertans	Edmonton (Bonnie Doon), Calgary, St. Paul, Bonnyville, Lac la Biche, Peace River, Falher	81,085	2.2%
British Columbia	Franco-Columbians	Greater Vancouver (Maillardville), Victoria	70,755	1.6%
Manitoba	Franco-Manitobans	Winnipeg (St. Boniface, St. Vital, St. Norbert), Eastman Region, Pembina Valley Region, Central Plains Region	47,680	3.8%
Nova Scotia	Acadians	Digby County, Richmond County, Inverness County, Yarmouth County	34,585	3.8%
Saskatchewan	Fransaskois	Regina, Saskatoon, Gravelbourg, Albertville, Zénon-Park, St. Isidore-de-Bellevue, Willow Bunch	18,935	1.9%
Prince Edward Island	Acadians	Prince County (Evangeline Region)	5,685	4.1%
Newfoundland and Labrador	Franco-Newfoundlanders	Port au Port Peninsula	3,015	0.6%
Yukon	Franco-Yukonnais	Whitehorse, Dawson City	1,630	4.8%
Northwest Territories	Franco-Ténois	Yellowknife, Hay River, Inuvik, Fort Smith	1,175	2.9%
Nunavut	Franco-Nunavois	Iqaluit	616	1.4%

=== Quebec ===
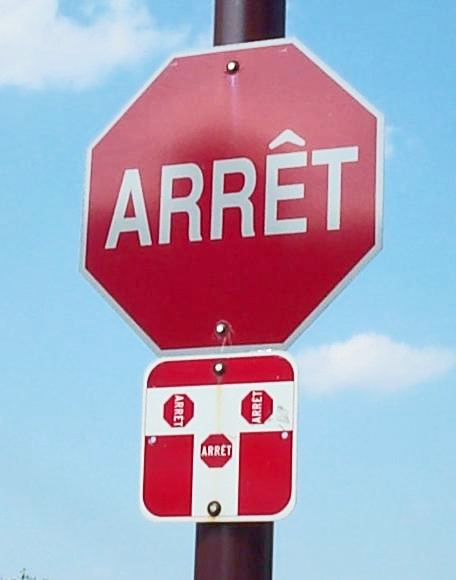
A Quebec French stop sign

A Québécois French speaker, recorded in Slovenia

Quebec is the only province whose sole official language is French. As of 2011, 71.2 percent of Québécois people are first language francophones. About 95 percent of Quebecers speak French. However, many of the services the provincial government provides are available in English for the sizeable anglophone population of the province (notably in Montreal). For native French speakers, Quebec French is noticeably different in pronunciation and vocabulary from the French of France, sometimes called Metropolitan French, but they are easily mutually intelligible in their formal varieties, and after moderate exposure, in most of their informal ones as well. The differences are primarily due to changes that have occurred in Quebec French and Parisian French since the 18th century, when Britain gained possession of Canada.

Different regions of Quebec have their own varieties: Gaspé Peninsula, Côte-Nord, Quebec City, Saguenay-Lac-Saint-Jean, Outaouais, and Abitibi-Témiscamingue have differences in pronunciation as well as in vocabulary. For example, depending on one's region, the ordinary word for "kettle" can be bouilloire, bombe, or canard.

In Quebec, the French language is of paramount importance. For example, the stop signs on the roads are written ARRÊT (which has the literal meaning of "stop" in French), even if other French-speaking countries, like France, use STOP. On a similar note, movies originally made in other languages than French (mostly movies originally made in English) are more literally named in Quebec than they are in France (e.g. The movie The Love Guru is called Love Gourou in France, but in Quebec it is called Le Gourou de l'amour).

=== The Maritimes ===
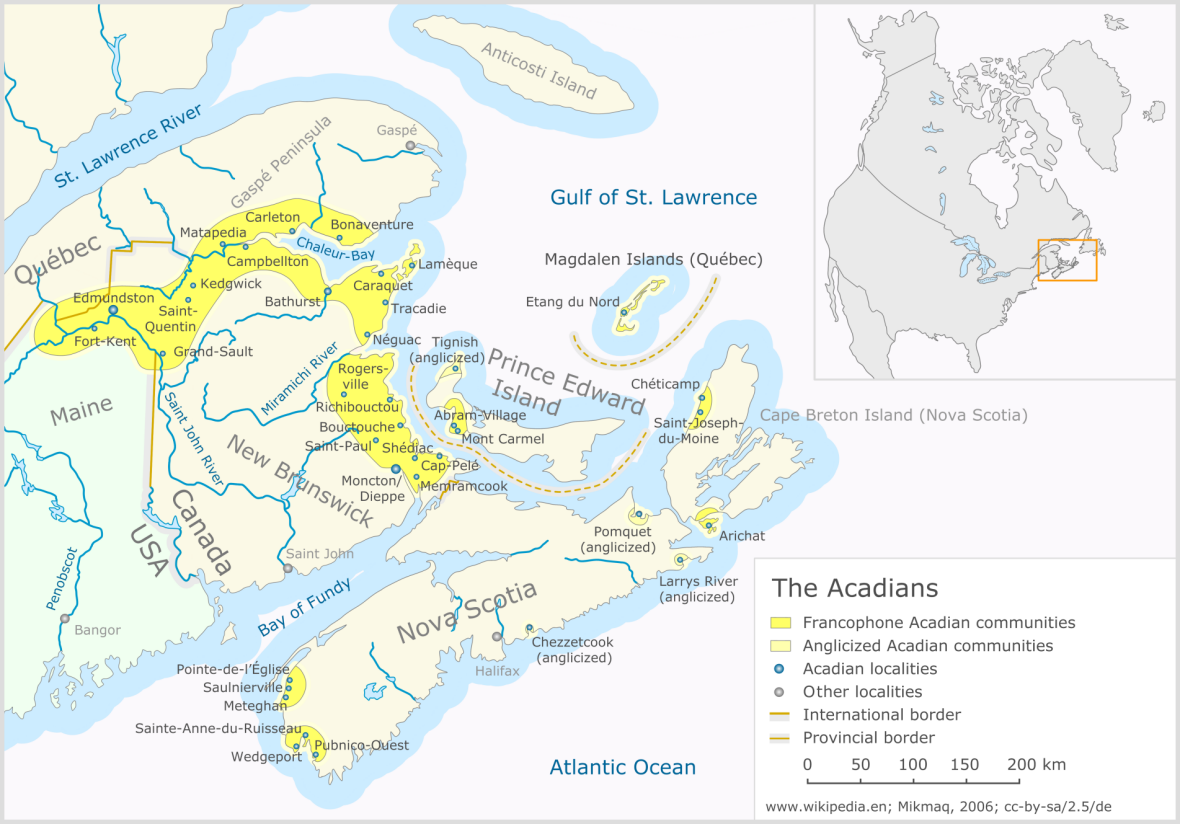
Present-day Acadian communities

The colonists living in what are now the provinces of New Brunswick and Nova Scotia were principally constituted of Bretons, Normans, and Basques. Conquered by the British, they suffered massive deportations to the United States and France. Others went into exile to Canada or to nearby islands. Those who stayed were persecuted. At the end of the 18th century, more liberal measures granted new lands to those who had stayed, and measures were taken to promote the return of numerous exiled people from Canada and Miquelon. The number of Acadians rose rapidly, to the point of gaining representation in the Legislative Assembly.

French is one of the official languages, with English, of the province of New Brunswick. Apart from Quebec, this is the only other Canadian province that recognizes French as an official language. Approximately one-third of New Brunswickers are francophone, by far the largest Acadian population in Canada.

The Acadian community is concentrated in primarily rural areas along the border with Quebec and the eastern coast of the province. Francophones in the Madawaska area may also be identified as Brayon, although sociologists have disputed whether the Brayons represent a distinct francophone community, a subgroup of the Acadians or an extraprovincial community of Québécois people. The only major Acadian population centre is Moncton, home to the main campus of the Université de Moncton. Francophones are, however, in the minority in Moncton.

In addition to New Brunswick, Acadian French has speakers in portions of Quebec and in the Atlantic provinces of Nova Scotia, Prince Edward Island, and Newfoundland. In these provinces, the percentage of francophones is much smaller than in New Brunswick. In some communities, French is an endangered language.

Linguists do not agree about the origin of Acadian French. Acadian French is influenced by the langues d'oïl. The dialect contains, among other features, the alveolar r and the pronunciation of the final syllable in the plural form of the verb in the third person. Acadia is the only place outside Jersey (a Channel Island close to mainland Normandy) where Jèrriais speakers can be found.

=== Ontario ===
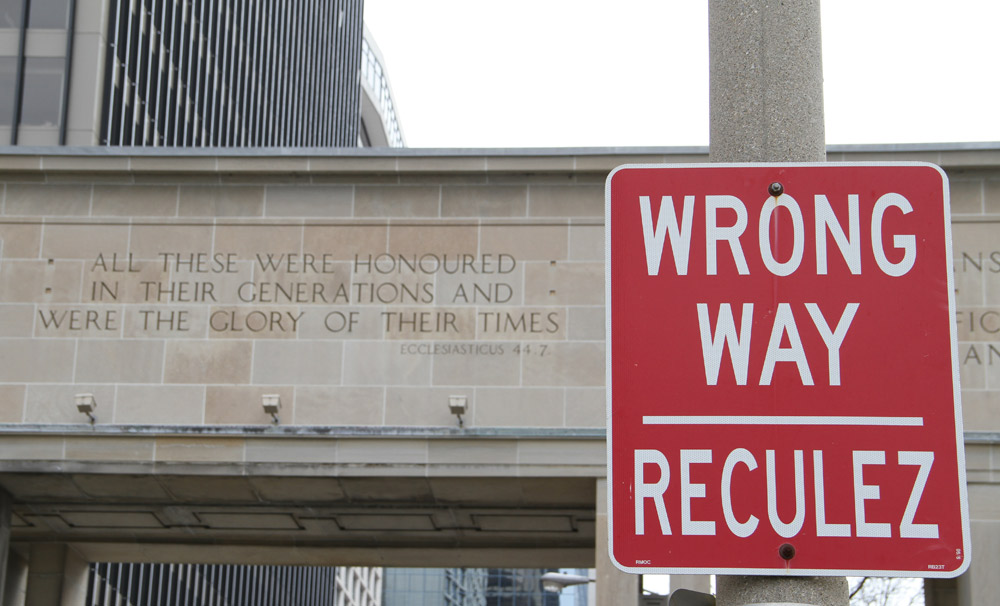
Bilingual street sign in Ottawa

French is the native language of over 500,000 persons in Ontario, representing 4.7 percent of the province's population. They are concentrated primarily in the Eastern Ontario and Northeastern Ontario regions, near the border with Quebec, although they are also present in smaller numbers throughout the province. Francophone Ontarians form part of a larger cultural group known as Franco-Ontarians, of whom only 60 percent still speak the language at home. The city of Ottawa counts the greatest number of Franco-Ontarians in the province. Franco-Ontarians are originally from a first wave of immigration from France, from a second wave from Quebec. The third wave comes from Quebec, but also from Haiti, Morocco, and Africa.

The province has no official language defined in law, although it is a largely English-speaking province. Ontario law requires that the provincial Legislative Assembly operate in both English and French (individuals can speak in the Assembly in the official language of their choice), and requires that all provincial statutes and bills be made available in both English and French. Furthermore, under the French Language Services Act, individuals are entitled to communicate with the head or central office of any provincial government department or agency in French, as well as to receive all government services in French in 25 designated areas in the province, selected according to minority population criteria. The provincial government of Ontario's website is bilingual. Residents of Ottawa, Toronto, Windsor, Sudbury and Timmins can receive services from their municipal government in the official language of their choice.

There are also several French-speaking communities on military bases in Ontario, such as the one at CFB Trenton. These communities have been founded by francophone Canadians in the Canadian Forces who live together in military residences.

The term Franco-Ontarian accepts two interpretations. According to the first one, it includes all French speakers of Ontario, wherever they come from. According to second one, it includes all French Canadians born in Ontario, whatever their level of French is. The use of French among Franco-Ontarians is in decline due to the omnipresence of the English language in a lot of fields.

=== Newfoundland ===
The island was discovered by European powers by John Cabot in 1497. Newfoundland was annexed by England in 1583. It is the first British possession in North America.

In 1610, the Frenchmen became established in the peninsula of Avalon and went to war against the Englishmen. In 1713, the Treaty of Utrecht acknowledged the sovereignty of Great Britain.

The origin of Franco-Newfoundlanders is double: the first ones to arrive are especially of Breton origin, attracted by the fishing possibilities. Then, from the 19th century, the Acadians who came from the Cape Breton Island and from the Magdalen Islands, an archipelago of nine small islands belonging to Quebec, become established.

Up to the middle of the 20th century, Breton fishers, who had Breton as their mother tongue, but who had been educated in French came to settle. This Breton presence can explain differences between the Newfoundland French and the Acadian French.

In the 1970s, the French language appears in the school of Cape St. George in the form of a bilingual education. In the 1980s, classes of French for native French speakers are organized there.

=== Western Canada ===
Manitoba also has a significant Franco-Manitoban community, centred especially in the St. Boniface area of Winnipeg, but also in numerous surrounding towns. The provincial government of Manitoba boasts the only bilingual website of the Prairies; the Canadian constitution makes French an official language in Manitoba for the legislature and courts. Saskatchewan also has a Fransaskois community, as does Alberta with its Franco-Albertans, and British Columbia hosts the Franco-Columbians.

Michif, a dialect of French originating in Western Canada, is a unique mixed language derived from Cree and French. It is spoken by a small number of Métis living mostly in Manitoba and in North Dakota.

=== Northern Canada ===
French is an official language in each of the three northern territories: Yukon, the Northwest Territories, and Nunavut. Francophones in Yukon are called Franco-Yukonnais, those from the Northwest Territories, Franco-Ténois (from the French acronym for the Northwest Territories, TN-O or Territoires du Nord-Ouest), and those in Nunavut, Franco-Nunavois.

== French-speaking communities in Canada outside Quebec ==
- Franco-Ontarians (or Ontarois)
- Acadians (in New Brunswick, Nova Scotia and Prince Edward Island
- Franco-Manitobans
- Fransaskois (in Saskatchewan)
- Franco-Albertans
- Franco-Columbians
- Franco-Terreneuviens
- Franco-Ténois (in the Northwest Territories)
- Franco-Yukon(n)ais (in Yukon)
- Franco-Nunavois (in Nunavut)

== Flags of French Canada ==
Québécois

Acadiens

Franco-Albertans

Fransaskois

Franco-Columbians

Franco-Manitobains

Franco-Ontariens

Franco-Yukonnais

Franco-Nunavois

Franco-Ténois

Franco-Terreneuviens

== See also ==
- American French
- Anti-Quebec sentiment
- Charter of the French Language
- Chiac
- French colonization of the Americas
- French language in the United States
- French phonology
- Influence of French on English
- Joual
- Languages of Canada
- Métis French
- Office québécois de la langue française
- Official bilingualism in Canada
- Quebec French lexicon
- French Canada
- French Canadian
- Geographical distribution of French speakers
- Varieties of French
- Francization
