= Conseil des écoles fransaskoises =

French-language school district in Saskatchewan, Canada

Location
- 1440 9th Avenue North; Regina, Saskatchewan S4R 8B1 Saskatchewan Canada
- Coordinates: 50.484788°N 104.601398°W

District information
- Grades: Pre K to 12
- Established: 1995
- CEO / Director of Education: Ronald Ajavon
- Schools: 14
- Budget: $38 million (2019)

Students and staff
- Students: 2,164 (2025)
- Teachers: 186 (full-time equivalent)

Other information
- Website: www.ecolefrancophone.com

The Conseil des écoles fransaskoises (CÉF) is a school division in the Canadian province of Saskatchewan. Primarily serving the Fransaskois community, is the only French-language school division in the province. CÉF is a hybrid division, both public and Roman Catholic. It operates 14 elementary and secondary schools throughout the province.

CÉF was created in 1995. In that year, it had 890 students, growing to over 2,100 students by 2025. It has schools in Gravelbourg, Ponteix, Saskatoon, Moose Jaw, Regina, Zenon Park, North Battleford, Vonda, Bellegarde, Bellevue, and Prince Albert.

In locations not served by one of the division's schools, students learn by distance education through either live videoconferencing sessions or web-based courses.
