= French Canadians =

North American ethnic group

Canadiens français

Total population
- 4,995,040 in Canada (by ancestry) (Note: 1981-present: Statistic also includes "Acadian" and "Quebecois" responses. Additionally, 1996-present census populations are undercounts, due to the addition of the "Canadian" (English) or "Canadien" (French) ethnic origin. All citizens of Canada are classified as "Canadians" as defined by Canada's nationality laws. However, "Canadian" as an ethnic group has since 1996 been added to census questionnaires for possible ancestry. "Canadian" was included as an example on the English questionnaire and "Canadien" as an example on the French questionnaire. "The majority of respondents to this selection are from the eastern part of the country that was first settled. Respondents generally are visibly European (Anglophones and Francophones), however no-longer self identify with their ethnic ancestral origins. This response is attributed to a multitude or generational distance from ancestral lineage.); 14.5% of the total Canadian population (2016) c. 10.56 million (French-speaking Canadians); 29.1% of the total Canadian population (2021) 1,998,012 in the United States (2020)

Regions with significant populations
- Canada: majority in Quebec, large minority in New Brunswick, small minorities in Northern Ontario, Eastern Ontario, Nova Scotia, Prince Edward Island, Alberta and Manitoba. United States: small French Canadian American minorities in New England, New York, Michigan and Louisiana.

Languages
- Canadian French, Canadian English, Franglais

Religion
- Predominantly Catholic, minority Protestant

Related ethnic groups
- Québécois, other French, Acadians, French Louisianians, Métis, Brayons, Breton Canadians, Norman Canadians, Basque Canadians, German Canadians, Belgian Canadians, Old Stock Canadians, French-Canadian Americans

French Canadians, referred to as Canadiens mainly before the nineteenth century, are an ethnic group descended from French colonists first arriving in France's colony of Canada in 1608. The vast majority of French Canadians live in the province of Quebec.

During the 17th century, French settlers originating mainly from the west and north of France settled Canada. It is from them that the French Canadian ethnicity was born. During the 17th to 18th centuries, French Canadians expanded across North America and colonized various regions, cities, and towns. As a result, people of French Canadian descent can be found across North America. Between 1840 and 1930, many French Canadians emigrated to New England, an event known as the Grande Hémorragie.

== Etymology ==
French Canadians get their name from the French colony of Canada, the most developed and densely populated region of New France during the period of French colonization in the 17th and 18th centuries. The original use of the term Canada referred to the area of present-day Quebec along the St. Lawrence River, divided in three districts (Québec, Trois-Rivières, and Montréal), as well as to the Pays d'en Haut (Upper Countries), a vast and thinly settled territorial dependence north and west of Montreal which covered the whole of the Great Lakes area.

From 1535 to the 1690s, Canadien was a word used by the French to refer to the First Nations they had encountered in the St. Lawrence River valley at Stadacona and Hochelaga; however, First Nations groups did not refer to themselves as Canadien. At the end of the 17th century, Canadien became an ethnonym distinguishing the French inhabitants of Canada from those of France. At the end of the 18th century, to distinguish between the English-speaking population and the French-speaking population, the terms English Canadian and French Canadian emerged. During the Quiet Revolution of the 1960s to 1980s, inhabitants of Quebec began to identify as Québécois instead of simply French Canadian.

== History ==
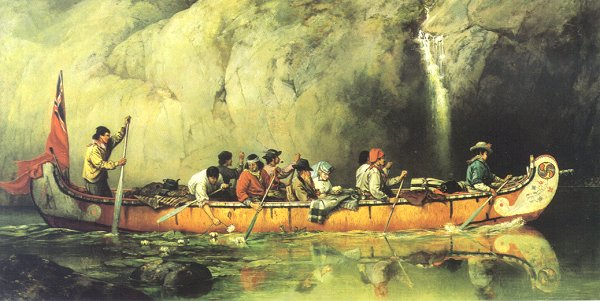
Voyageurs Passing a Waterfall by Frances Anne Hopkins

French settlers from Normandy, Perche, Beauce, Brittany, Maine, Anjou, Touraine, Poitou, Aunis, Angoumois, Saintonge, and Gascony were the first Europeans to permanently colonize what is now Quebec, parts of Ontario, Acadia, and select areas of Western Canada. Their colonies of New France stretched across what today are the Maritime provinces, southern Quebec and Ontario, as well as the entire Mississippi River Valley.

In 1603, Samuel de Champlain began exploring the area of modern-day Quebec. The first permanent European settlements in Canada were established at Port Royal in 1605 and Quebec City in 1608 as fur trading posts. The territories of New France were Canada, Acadia, and Louisiana; the mid-continent Illinois Country was at first governed from Canada and then attached to Louisiana. The inhabitants of the New French colony of Canada called themselves Canadiens and came mostly from northwestern France. The early Acadians came mostly but not exclusively from Aquitaine.

Canadien explorers and fur traders would come to be known as coureurs des bois and voyageurs, while those who settled on farms would come to be known as habitants. Many French Canadians are the descendants of the King's Daughters. A few also are the descendants of mixed French and Algonquian marriages (see also Metis people). During the mid-18th century, French explorers and Canadiens born in French Canada colonized other parts of North America in modern-day Louisiana; Mississippi; Missouri; Illinois; Vincennes, Indiana; Louisville, Kentucky; the Windsor-Detroit region; and the Canadian prairies (primarily southern Manitoba).

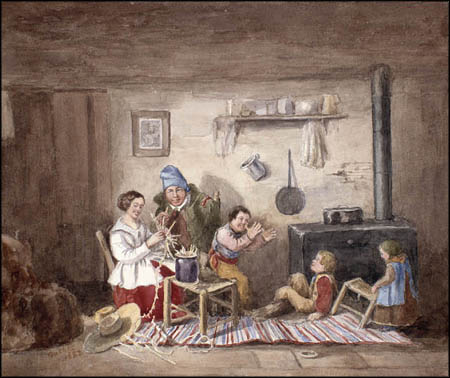
Habitants by Cornelius Krieghoff (1852)

After the 1760 British conquest of New France in the French and Indian War, the French-Canadian population remained important in the life of the colonies. The British gained Acadia by the Treaty of Utrecht in 1713. It took the 1774 Quebec Act for French Canadians to regain the French civil law system, and in 1791 French Canadians in Lower Canada were introduced to the parliamentary system when an elected Legislative Assembly was created. The Legislative Assembly having no real power, the political situation degenerated into the Lower Canada Rebellions of 1837–1838, after which Lower Canada and Upper Canada were unified. Some of the motivations for the union was to limit French-Canadian political power and at the same time transferring a large part of the Upper Canadian debt to the debt-free Lower Canada. After many decades of British immigration, the Canadiens became a minority in the Province of Canada in the 1850s.

French-Canadian contributions were essential in securing responsible government for the Canadas and in undertaking Canadian Confederation. In the late 19th and 20th centuries, French Canadians' discontent grew with their place in Canada because of a series of events, including the execution of Louis Riel; the elimination of official bilingualism in Manitoba; Canada's participation in the Second Boer War; Regulation 17, which banned French language schools in Ontario; the Conscription Crisis of 1917; and the Conscription Crisis of 1944.

Between the 1840s and the 1930s, some 900,000 French Canadians immigrated to New England. About half of them returned home. The generations born in the United States would eventually come to see themselves as Franco-Americans. During the same period of time, numerous French Canadians also migrated to eastern and northern Ontario. The descendants of those Quebec inter-provincial migrants constitute the bulk of today's Franco-Ontarian community.

Since 1968, French has been one of Canada's two official languages. It is the sole official language of Quebec and one of the official languages of New Brunswick, Yukon, the Northwest Territories, and Nunavut. Ontario has no official languages defined in law, although the provincial government provides French language services in many parts of the province under the French Language Services Act.

== Demography ==
=== Genetics ===
French Canadians of Quebec are a classic example of founder population. Over 150 years of French colonization, between 1608 and 1760, an estimated 8,500 pioneers married and left at least one descendant on the territory. Following the takeover of the colony by the British crown in 1760, immigration from France effectively stopped, but descendants of French settlers continued to grow in number due to their high fertility rate. Intermarriage occurred mostly with the deported Acadians and migrants coming from the British Isles. Since the 20th century, the French-Canadian population has experienced significantly more intermixing with other ethnic groups, from many different origins. Nevertheless, while the French Canadians of Quebec today may be partly of other ancestries, the genetic contribution of the original French founders remains predominant, explaining about 90% of regional gene pools, while Acadians (descended from other French settlers in eastern Canada) account for 4% and British 2%, with Native American and other groups contributing less.

=== Language ===
There are many varieties of French spoken by francophone Canadians, for example Quebec French, Acadian French, Métis French, and Newfoundland French. The French spoken in Ontario, the Canadian West, and New England can trace their roots back to Quebec French because of Quebec's diaspora. Over time, many regional accents have emerged. Canada is estimated to be home to between 32 and 36 regional French accents, 17 of which can be found in Quebec, and seven of which are found in New Brunswick. There are also people who will naturally speak using Québécois Standard or Joual which are considered sociolects.

There are about seven million French Canadians and native French speakers in Quebec. Another one million French-speaking French Canadians are distributed throughout the rest of Canada. French Canadians may also speak Canadian English, especially if they live in overwhelmingly English-speaking environments. In Canada, not all those of French Canadian ancestry speak French, but the vast majority do.

Francophones living in Canadian provinces other than Quebec have enjoyed minority language rights under Canadian law since the Official Languages Act of 1969, and under the Canadian Constitution since 1982, protecting them from provincial governments that have historically been indifferent towards their presence. At the provincial level, New Brunswick formally designates French as a full official language, while other provinces vary in the level of French language services they offer. All three of Canada's territories include French as an official language of the territory alongside English and local indigenous languages; however, in practice, French-language services are normally available only in the capital cities and not across the entire territory.

=== Religion ===
Catholicism is the chief denomination amongst French Canadians. The kingdom of France forbade non-Catholic settlement in New France from 1629 onward; thus, almost all French settlers of Canada were Catholic. In the United States, some families of French-Canadian origin have converted to Protestantism. Until the 1960s, religion was a central component of French-Canadian national identity. The Church parish was the focal point of civic life in French-Canadian society, and religious orders ran French-Canadian schools, hospitals and orphanages and were very influential in everyday life in general. During the Quiet Revolution of the 1960s, however, the practice of Catholicism dropped drastically. In 2025 however, there was a reported rise in adult baptisms and an increased number of baptisms of people over the age of 7. The Catholic Church of Quebec described the recent increase in baptisms among adults and adolescents as a "surprising phenomenon … gaining momentum" and that interest in Catholic baptism is "especially present" in young people and in adults from immigrant backgrounds. Later on Holy Saturday in 2026, it was reported that young people were joining the Catholic Church due to the presence of priests and young influencers on social media platforms such as TikTok and Instagram. Other reasons for young people joining the Catholic Church was reported to be due to taking an interest in Quebec's religious heritage so that they could "understand their identity."

French Canadian demography by religion
Religious group	2021 (Note: Religious breakdown proportions based on "French" ethnic or cultural origin response on the 2021 census.)		2001 (Note: Religious breakdown proportions based on "French" ethnic or cultural origin response on the 2001 census.)	
Religious group	Pop.	%	Pop.	%
Christianity	5,557,055	62.39%	4,086,585	87.54%
Islam	16,970	0.19%	5,325	0.11%
Irreligion	3,194,135	35.86%	551,100	11.8%
Judaism	19,860	0.22%	8,575	0.18%
Buddhism	7,570	0.08%	4,995	0.11%
Hinduism	1,825	0.02%	665	0.01%
Indigenous spirituality	7,175	0.08%	3,105	0.07%
Sikhism	505	0.01%	345	0.01%
Other	55,080	0.62%	7,700	0.16%
Total French Canadian population	8,906,985	100%	4,668,410	100%

French Canadian demography by Christian sects
Religious group	2021		2001	
Religious group	Pop.	%	Pop.	%
Catholic	4,431,330	79.74%	3,373,730	82.56%
Orthodox	16,100	0.29%	7,110	0.17%
Protestant	963,255	17.33%	628,275	15.37%
Other Christian	496,730	8.94%	77,470	1.9%
Total French canadian christian population	5,557,055	100%	4,086,585	100%

== Geographical distribution ==
People who claim some French-Canadian ancestry or heritage number some 7 million in Canada. In the United States, 2.4 million people report French-Canadian ancestry or heritage, while an additional 8.4 million claim French ancestry; they are treated as a separate ethnic group by the U.S. Census Bureau.

=== Canada ===
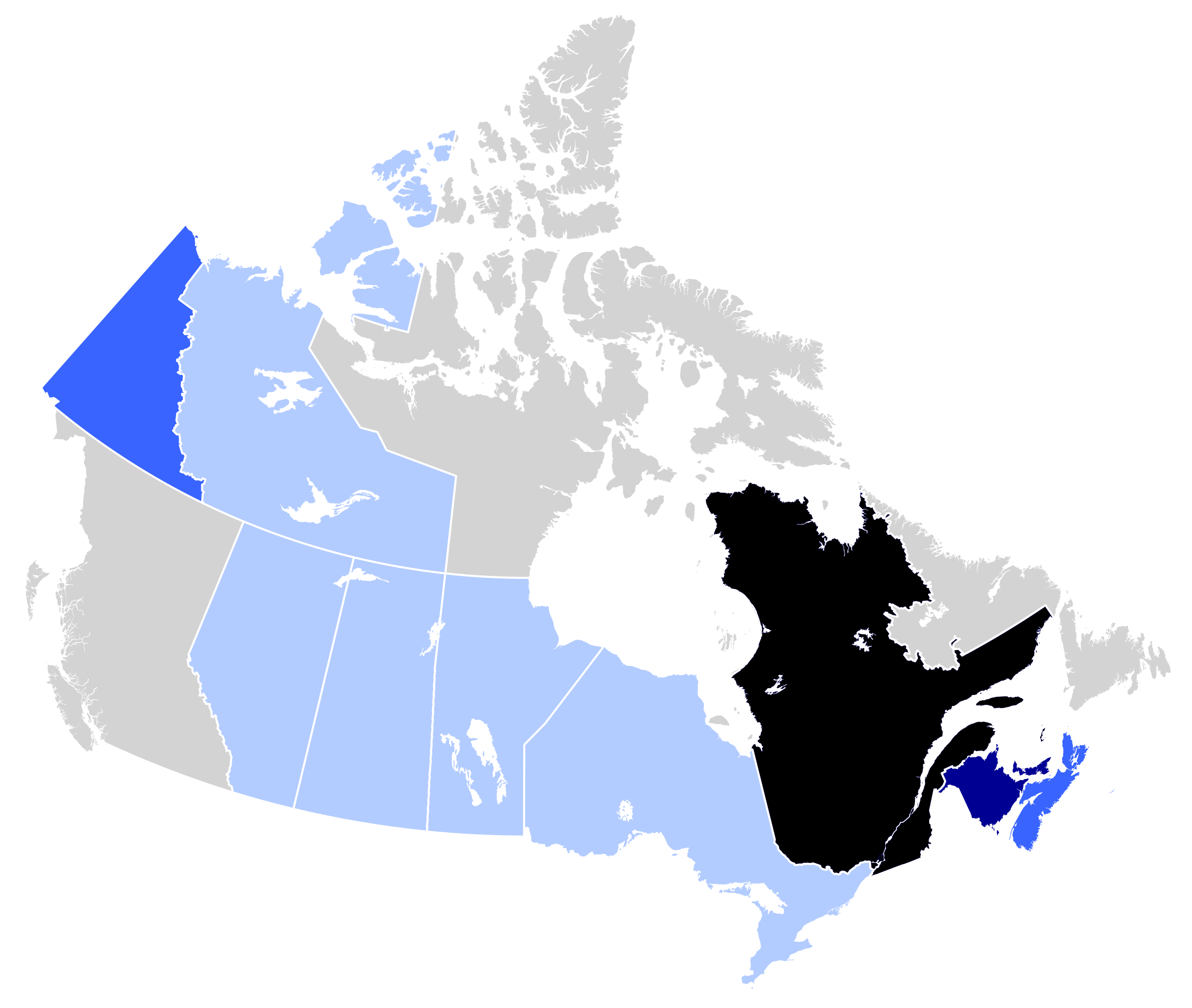
Distribution of the proportion of French Canadian across Canada.

In Canada, 85% of French Canadians reside in Quebec where they constitute the majority of the population in all regions except the far north (Nord-du-Québec). Most cities and villages in this province were built and settled by the French or French Canadians during the French colonial rule.

There are various urban and small centres in Canada outside Quebec that have long-standing populations of French Canadians, going back to the late 19th century, due to interprovincial migration. Eastern and Northern Ontario have large populations of francophones in communities such as Ottawa, Cornwall, Hawkesbury, Sudbury, Timmins, North Bay, Timiskaming, Welland and Windsor. Many also pioneered the Canadian Prairies in the late 18th century, founding the towns of Saint Boniface, Manitoba and in Alberta's Peace Country, including the region of Grande Prairie.

Quebec's historic French-speaking population descend from the French pioneers of the 17th and 18th century.

The French-speaking population have massively chosen the "Canadian" ("Canadien") ethnic group since the government made it possible (1986), which has made the current statistics misleading. The term Canadien historically referred only to a French-speaker, though today it is used in French to describe any Canadian citizen.

=== United States ===
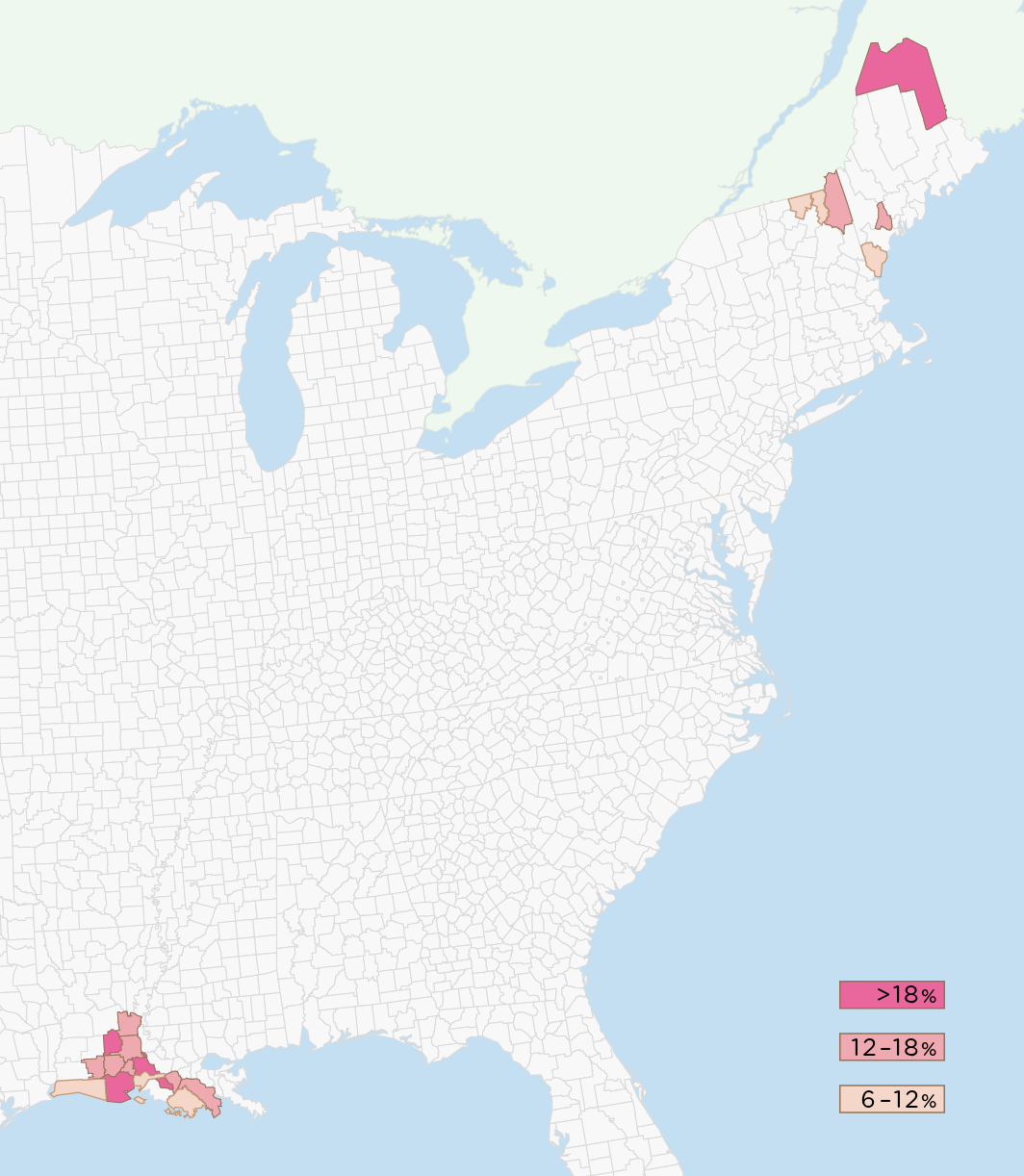
Distribution of French in the United States

In the United States, many cities were founded as colonial outposts of New France by French or French-Canadian explorers. They include Mobile (Alabama), Coeur d'Alene (Idaho), Vincennes (Indiana), Belleville (Illinois), Bourbonnais (Illinois), Prairie du Rocher (Illinois), Dubuque (Iowa), Baton Rouge (Louisiana), New Orleans (Louisiana), Detroit (Michigan), Biloxi (Mississippi), Creve Coeur (Missouri), St. Louis (Missouri), Pittsburgh (Fort Duquesne, Pennsylvania), Provo (Utah), Green Bay (Wisconsin), La Crosse (Wisconsin), Milwaukee (Wisconsin) or Prairie du Chien (Wisconsin).

The majority of the French-Canadian population in the United States is found in the New England area, although there is also a large French-Canadian presence in Plattsburgh, New York, across Lake Champlain from Burlington, Vermont. Quebec and Acadian emigrants settled in industrial cities like Fitchburg, Leominster, Lynn, Worcester, Haverhill, Waltham, Lowell, Gardner, Lawrence, Chicopee, Somerset, Fall River, and New Bedford in Massachusetts; Woonsocket in Rhode Island; Manchester and Nashua in New Hampshire; Bristol, Hartford, and East Hartford in Connecticut; throughout the state of Vermont, particularly in Burlington, St. Albans, and Barre; and Biddeford and Lewiston in Maine. Smaller groups of French Canadians settled in the Midwest, notably in the states of Michigan, Illinois, Wisconsin, Nebraska, Iowa, Missouri, and Minnesota. French Canadians also settled in central North Dakota, largely in Rolette and Bottineau counties, and in South Dakota.

Some Metis still speak Michif, a language influenced by French, and a mixture of other European and Native American tribal languages.

== Identities ==
=== Canada ===
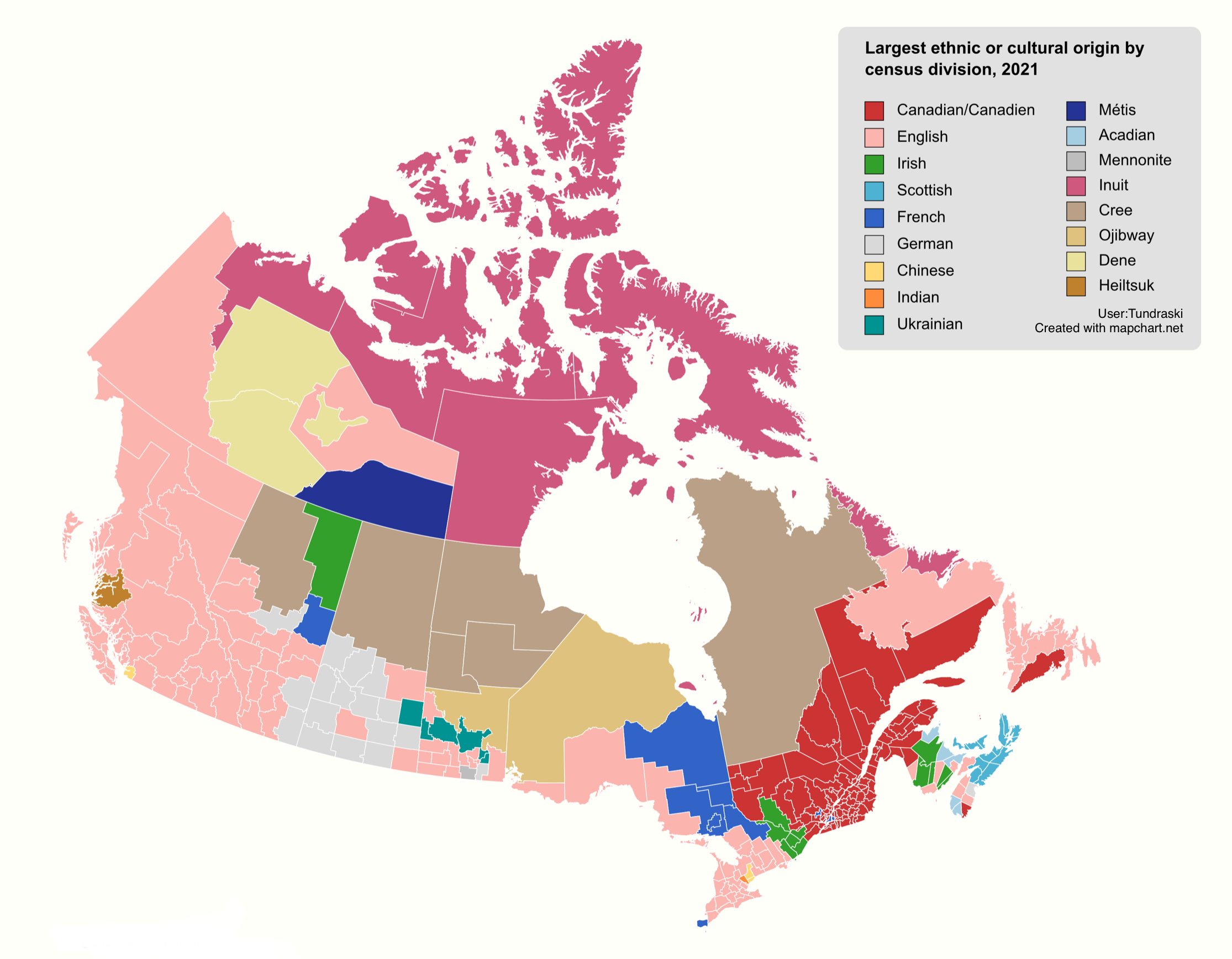
Major ethnicities in Canada, 2021.

Reported French population history in Canada
Year	Pop.	±%
1871	1,082,940	—
1881	1,298,929	+19.9%
1901	1,649,371	+27.0%
1911	2,061,719	+25.0%
1921	2,452,743	+19.0%
1931	2,927,990	+19.4%
1941	3,483,038	+19.0%
1951	4,319,167	+24.0%
1961	5,540,346	+28.3%
1971	6,180,120	+11.5%
1981	7,111,540	+15.1%
1986	8,123,360	+14.2%
1991	8,389,180	+3.3%
1996	5,709,215	−31.9%
2001	4,809,250	−15.8%
2006	5,146,940	+7.0%
2011	5,386,995	+4.7%
2016	4,995,040	−7.3%
Source: Statistics Canada Note 1: 1981 Canadian census only included partial multiple ethnic origin responses for individuals with British and French ancestry. Note 2: 1996-present censuses include the "Canadian" ethnic origin category.

French Canadians express their cultural or ancestral roots using a number of different terms. In the 2021 census, French-speaking Canadians identified their ethnicity, in order of prevalence, most often as Canadian, French, Québécois, French Canadian, and Acadian. All of these except for French were grouped together by Jantzen (2006) as "French New World" ancestries because they originate in Canada.

Jantzen (2006) distinguishes the English Canadian, meaning "someone whose family has been in Canada for multiple generations", and the French Canadien, used to refer to descendants of the original settlers of New France in the 17th and 18th centuries. "Canadien" was used to refer to the French-speaking residents of New France beginning in the last half of the 17th century. The English-speaking residents who arrived later from Great Britain were called "Anglais". This usage continued until Canadian Confederation in 1867. Confederation united several former British colonies into the Dominion of Canada, and from that time forward, the word "Canadian" has been used to describe both English-speaking and French-speaking citizens, wherever they live in the country.

Those reporting "French New World" ancestries overwhelmingly had ancestors that went back at least four generations in Canada. Fourth generation Canadiens and Québécois showed considerable attachment to their ethno-cultural group, with 70% and 61%, respectively, reporting a strong sense of belonging.

The generational profile and strength of identity of French New World ancestries contrast with those of British or Canadian ancestries, which represent the largest ethnic identities in Canada. Although deeply rooted Canadians express a deep attachment to their ethnic identity, most English-speaking Canadians of British or Canadian ancestry generally cannot trace their ancestry as far back in Canada as French speakers. As a result, their identification with their ethnicity is weaker: for example, only 50% of third generation "Canadians" strongly identify as such, bringing down the overall average. The survey report notes that 80% of Canadians whose families had been in Canada for three or more generations reported "Canadian and provincial or regional ethnic identities". These identities include French New World ancestries such as "Québécois" (37% of Quebec population) and Acadian (6% of Atlantic provinces).

==== Quebec ====
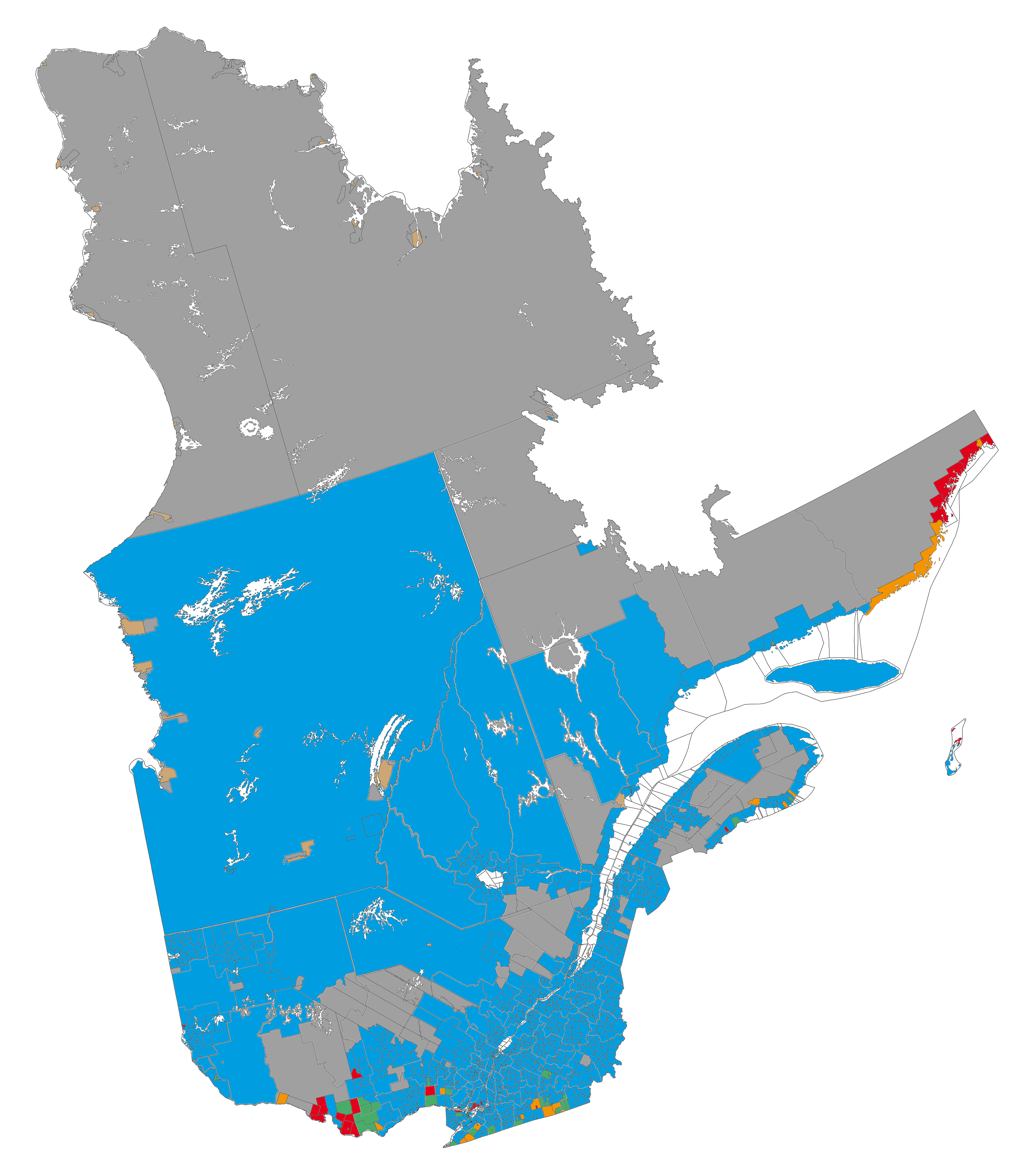
Languages in Quebec

Since the 1960s, French Canadians in Quebec have generally used Québécois (masculine) or Québécoise (feminine) to express their cultural and national identity, rather than Canadien français and Canadienne française. Francophones who self-identify as Québécois and do not have French-Canadian ancestry may not identify as "French Canadian" (Canadien or Canadien français); however, by extension, though the term "French Canadian" may refer to natives of the province of Quebec or other parts of French Canada of foreign descent. Those who do have French or French-Canadian ancestry, but who support Quebec sovereignty, often find Canadien français to be archaic or even pejorative. This is a reflection of the strong social, cultural, and political ties that most Quebecers of French-Canadian origin, who constitute a majority of francophone Quebecers, maintain within Quebec. It has given Québécois an ambiguous meaning which has often played out in political issues, as all public institutions attached to the Government of Quebec refer to all Quebec citizens, regardless of their language or their cultural heritage, as Québécois.

Academic analysis of French Canadian culture has often focused on the degree to which the Quiet Revolution, particularly the shift in the social and cultural identity of the Québécois following the Estates General of French Canada of 1966 to 1969, did or did not create a "rupture" between the Québécois and other francophones elsewhere in Canada.

==== Elsewhere in Canada ====
The emphasis on the French language and Quebec autonomy means that French speakers across Canada may now self-identify as québécois(e), acadien(ne), or Franco-canadien(ne), or as provincial linguistic minorities such as Franco-manitobain(e), Franco-ontarien(ne) or fransaskois(e). Education, health and social services are provided by provincial institutions, so that provincial identities are often used to identify French-language institutions:

Map of French language ability in Ontario according to the 2021 census.

- Franco-Newfoundlanders, province of Newfoundland and Labrador, also known as Terre-Neuvien(ne)
- Franco-Ontarians, province of Ontario, also referred to as Ontarien(ne)
- Franco-Manitobans, province of Manitoba, also referred to as Manitobain(e)
- Fransaskois, province of Saskatchewan, also referred to Saskois(e)
- Franco-Albertans, province of Alberta, also referred to Albertain(e)
- Franco-Columbians, province of British Columbia mostly live in the Vancouver metro area; also referred to as Franco-Colombien(ne)
- Franco-Yukonnais, territory of Yukon, also referred to as Yukonais(e)
- Franco-Ténois, territory of Northwest Territories, also referred to as Ténois(e)
- Franco-Nunavois, territory of Nunavut, also referred to as Nunavois(e)

Acadians residing in the provinces of New Brunswick, Prince Edward Island and Nova Scotia represent a distinct ethnic French-speaking culture. This group's culture and history evolved separately from the French Canadian culture, at a time when the Maritime Provinces were not part of what was referred to as Canada, and are consequently considered a distinct culture from French Canadians.

Brayons in Madawaska County, New Brunswick and Aroostook County, Maine may be identified with either the Acadians or the Québécois, or considered a distinct group in their own right, by different sources.

French Canadians outside Quebec are more likely to self-identify as "French Canadian". Identification with provincial groupings varies from province to province, with Franco-Ontarians, for example, using their provincial label far more frequently than Franco-Columbians do. Few identify only with the provincial groupings, explicitly rejecting "French Canadian" as an identity label. A population genetics ancestry study claims that for those French Canadians who trace their ancestry to the French founder population, a significant percentage, 53-78% have at least one indigenous ancestor.

=== United States ===
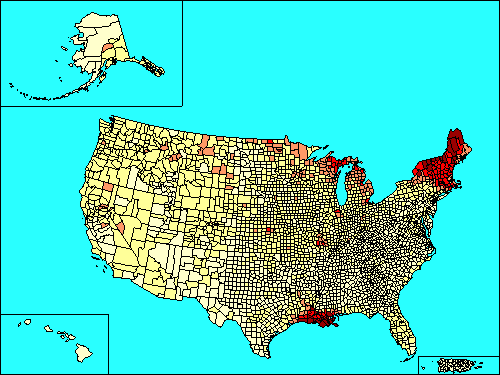
Distribution of French Americans in the United States (c. 2000)

During the mid-18th century, French Canadian explorers and colonists colonized other parts of North America in what are today Louisiana (called Louisianais), Mississippi, Missouri, Illinois, Wisconsin, Indiana, Ohio, far northern New York and the Upper Peninsula of Michigan as well as around Detroit. They also founded such cities as New Orleans and St. Louis and villages in the Mississippi Valley. French Canadians later emigrated in large numbers from Canada to the United States between the 1840s and the 1930s in search of economic opportunities in border communities and industrialized portions of New England. French-Canadian communities in the United States remain along the Quebec border in Maine, Vermont, and New Hampshire, as well as further south in Massachusetts, Rhode Island, and Connecticut. There is also a significant community of French Canadians in South Florida, particularly Hollywood, Florida, especially during the winter months. The wealth of Catholic churches named after St. Louis throughout New England is indicative of the French immigration to the area. They came to identify as Franco-American, especially those who were born American.

Distinctions between French Canadian, natives of France, and other New World French identities is more blurred in the U.S. than in Canada; however, those who identify as French Canadian or Franco American generally do not regard themselves as French. Rather, they identify culturally, historically, and ethnically with the culture that originated in Quebec that is differentiated from French culture. In L'Avenir du français aux États-Unis, Calvin Veltman and Benoît Lacroix found that since the French language has been so widely abandoned in the United States, the term "French Canadian" has taken on an ethnic rather than linguistic meaning.

French Canadian identities are influenced by historical events that inform regional cultures. For example, in New England, the relatively recent immigration (19th/20th centuries) is informed by experiences of language oppression and an identification with certain occupations, such as the mill workers. In the Great Lakes, many French Canadians also identify as Métis and trace their ancestry to the earliest voyageurs and settlers; many also have ancestry dating to the lumber era and often a mixture of the two groups.

The main Franco-American regional identities are:

- French Canadians:
  - French Canadians of the Great Lakes (including Muskrat French)
  - New England French
- Creoles:
  - Missouri French (and other people of French ancestry in the former Illinois Country)
  - Louisiana Creoles (who speak Colonial French)
- Cajuns

== Culture ==
=== Agriculture ===
Traditionally, Canadiens had a subsistence agriculture in Eastern Canada (Québec). This subsistence agriculture slowly evolved in dairy farm during the end of the 19th century and the beginning of 20th century while retaining the subsistence side. By 1960, agriculture changed toward an industrial agriculture. French Canadians have selectively bred distinct livestock over the centuries, including cattle, horses and chickens.

== See also ==
- Canadians in France
- French Americans
- Quebec diaspora
- List of francophone communities in Ontario
- French language in Canada
- Canada–France relations
- Clerico-nationalism

== Genealogical works ==
Below is a list of the main genealogical works retracing the origins of French Canadian families:

1. Hubert Charbonneau and Jacques Legaré, Répertoire des actes de baptême, mariage et sépulture et des recensements du Québec ancien, vol. I-XLVII. Montréal : Les Presses de l'Université de Montréal, 1980. (ISBN 2-7606-0471-3)
2. René Jetté and collab, Dictionnaire généalogique des familles du Québec. Des origines à 1730, Montréal : Les Presses de l'Université de Montréal, 1983. (ISBN 9782891058155)
3. Noël Montgomery Elliot, Les Canadiens français 1600-1900, vol. I-III. Toronto : 1st edition, La Bibliothèque de recherche généalogique, 1992. (ISBN 0-919941-20-6)
4. Cyprien Tanguay, Dictionnaire généalogique des familles canadiennes. Depuis la fondation de la colonie jusqu'à nos jours, vol. I-VII, 1871–1890. Nouvelle édition, Montréal : Éditions Élysée, 1975. (ISBN 0-88545-009-4)
