= Franco-Columbian =

Linguistic group in British Columbia, Canada

Franco-Columbians
Franco-Colombiens (French)

Total population
- French ethnicity: 388,815 (2016); Francophones: 71,705 (2016)

Regions with significant populations
- British Columbia (Lower Mainland)

Languages
- Canadian French; Canadian English; Franglais

Religion
- Predominantly Christian (Roman Catholicism, other denominations)

Related ethnic groups
- French Canadians; Acadians; Franco-Albertan; Franco-Manitoban; Franco-Ontarian; Franco-Newfoundlander; Franco-Ténois; Franco-Yukonnais; Fransaskois; Québécois; French; French Americans; Métis

Franco-Columbians (French: Franco-Colombiens) are French Canadians or Canadian francophones living in the province of British Columbia. According to the 2016 Canadian Census, 71,705 residents of the province stated that French is their mother tongue. In the same census, 388,815 British Columbians claimed full or partial French ancestry.

The first francophones to enter the region were French Canadian voyageurs employed with the North West Company during the late 18th and early 19th centuries. French fur traders continued to visit the region in the early 19th century, with the French language serving as a lingua franca for the regional fur trade. Franco-Columbians formed the majority of Europeans in the region until the Fraser Canyon Gold Rush in 1858, which saw anglophone settlers become the predominant group in the area. Franco-Columbians began to lobby for French language rights within the province in the mid 20th century, which led to the public funding of francophone classes in 1978, and an independent public school board in 1995.

There are several Franco-Columbian communities throughout British Columbia; although most are based in the Lower Mainland, with the largest francophone community in that region being Maillardville, a community settled by forty French Canadian families in 1909. The province's francophone community has become diversified since the mid-20th century, with migrants from Africa, Asia, and Europe settling in the province. Radio-Canada, the country's French-language public broadcaster, serves as the main French-language media outlet in the province.

== Demographics ==
In the 2016 Canadian Census, the number of British Columbians with French as a mother tongue was at 71,705, or 1.6 per cent of the province's population. French is the most common mother tongue in the province following English, Punjabi, Cantonese, Mandarin, and Tagalog. The majority of Franco-Columbians are bilingual in English and French, with only 1,805 respondents in the 2016 census reporting to have proficiency in only the French-language. In the same census, 314,925 British Columbians, or approximately 6.8 per cent of the population, reported to be bilingual in both English and French. However, the following figure includes French second language speakers, in addition to Franco-Columbians.

Approximately 12 per cent of Franco-Columbians were born in the province; with a large portion of the province's francophone population is made up of migrants that moved from other parts of Canada and the Francosphere. Approximately 59 per cent of Franco-Columbians were born in another province or territory of Canada, while 28 per cent of Franco-Columbians were born outside the country. Among the francophones that were born abroad, half originated from Europe, 22 per cent from Asia, 18 per cent from Africa, and the rest from the Americas. The number of francophones from outside Canada has led to a diversification of the Franco-Columbian community in recent decades.

There are 388,815 British Columbians who claim partial or full French ancestry during the 2016 census. French is the seventh most commonly reported ethnic group in British Columbia after English, Canadian, Scottish, Irish, German, and Chinese.

=== Communities ===
As of 2016, approximately 58 per cent of Franco-Columbians resided in communities within the southwest coast of British Columbia (including the Lower Mainland). Approximately 22 per cent of Franco-Columbians resided in Vancouver Island and the central coast of British Columbia, 12 per cent of Franco-Columbians resided in the Okanagan-Thompson region, and the remaining 10 per cent of Franco-Columbians are spread throughout the other regions of British Columbia.

The largest community for Franco-Columbians within the Lower Mainland is Maillardville, a neighbourhood within the city of Coquitlam. The community originated from French Canadian lumber workers hired by the Canadian Western Lumber Company from Eastern Ontario, and Quebec in 1909. Today Maillardville describes itself as "a community with a francophone heart" and is home to several francophone community organizations, schools, churches, a retirement home, and an organization of francophone LEVII and guides. Community organizations place the francophone population of the Coquitlam area at 13,000. The community also hosts Festival du Bois, an annual event celebrating francophone culture. Additional francophone community centres and resources in the Lower Mainland are situated in Vancouver. In addition to the Lower Mainland, francophone community centres and resources can also be found in Kamloops, Nanaimo Nelson, Kelowna, Penticton, Powell River, Prince George, and Victoria.

== History ==
=== Early settlers ===
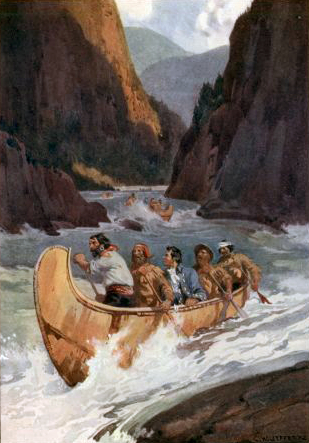
Depiction of Voyageurs along the Fraser River in 1808 by Charles William Jefferys

The first French Canadians documented in the region was in 1793; they worked as guides, interpreters, and voyageurs for the North West Company's expedition through the Rocky Mountains. Francophones made up six of the ten members of the initial 1793 expedition led by Scottish-born explorer, Alexander Mackenzie. The majority of the francophones hired for the expedition originated from Montreal, and included French Canadians as well as the Metis. French Canadians made up of the majority of the crews for subsequent North West Company expeditions undertaken by David Thompson and Simon Fraser. Thompson established Kootanae House during his 1807 expedition, along with four French Canadians. By 1812, there were approximately 300 French Canadian fur traders in the region engaged in either fur trading or farming.

The French-speaking voyageurs and traders continued to make up the majority of the Europeans that settled near the fur trading posts of the Fraser Valley, and Vancouver Island. Because the majority of the early European settlers in the region were French traders, the French language was used as the lingua franca of the fur trade until the 1850s.

French-speaking Roman Catholic missionaries from the Canadas, and France were among the first residents in the region. The most prominent Catholic orders working in the region in the early 19th century included the Sisters of Saint Anne based in Montreal, and Missionary Oblates of Mary Immaculate based in France. The former typically set out to educate the children of the region, whereas latter order set out to impose a European lifestyle upon the First Nations communities in the region, leading to the foundation of communities based in Mission, and Kelowna. French remained the language of instruction for these missionaries until the 1850s, when English became more prominent, and recruits were increasingly drawn from the anglophone population.

In addition to fur trading and missionary work, francophones were also employed with the first law enforcement and military unit raised within the Colony of Vancouver Island. Formed by the colonial governor in 1851, the Victoria Voltigeurs was a volunteer unit made up of French-speaking Métis and French Canadian voyageurs. The unit served alongside the Royal Navy's Pacific Station until March 1858, when the colony disbanded the voltigeurs.

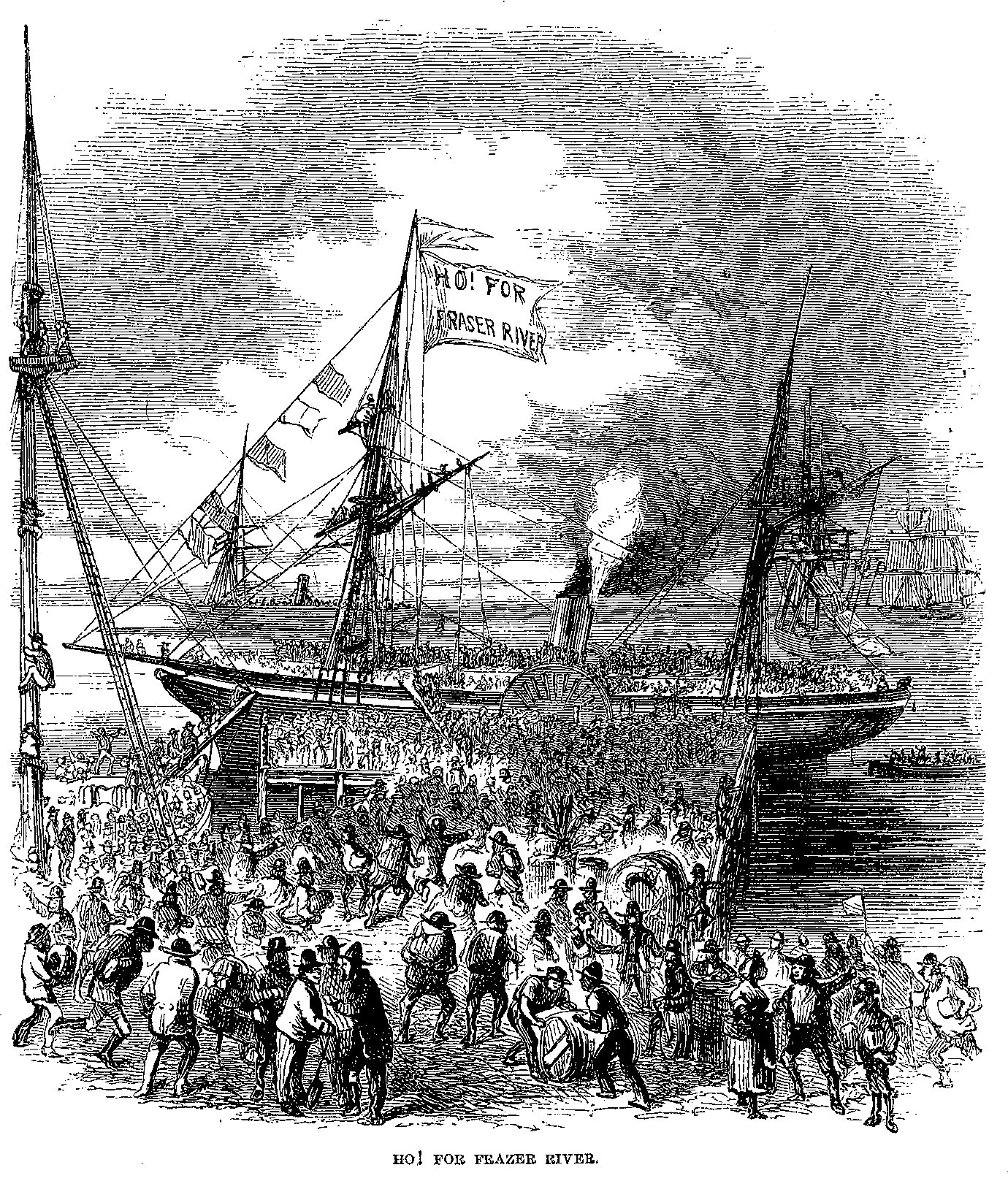
Prospectors on the way to the Fraser Canyon during the 1858 gold rush. The influx of settlers displaced the French as the major European group in the area.

Although the influx in migrants from the Fraser Canyon Gold Rush in 1858 occurred for only a brief period, it caused a significant shift in the demographics of the newly established Colony of British Columbia; it caused French to be displaced as the dominant European language in the region.

=== 20th century ===
After the Canadian Western Lumber Company adopted a racial policy of not employing people of Chinese or South Asian descent, the company sent out a francophone employee to Eastern Ontario and Quebec in an effort to recruit French Canadian lumber workers to work for the company. Approximately 40 families took up the offer to work in British Columbia, settling in present-day Maillardville. The community saw another influx of francophone settlers during the 1930s from the Canadian Prairies following a series of severe droughts that afflicted that region.

In 1945, the Fédération canadienne-française de la Colombie-Britannique (FFCB) was formed by francophones in British Columbia, providing a collective voice for various local Franco-Columbian organizations, and as an attempt to advance French-language accessibility rights within the province. The organization had initially lobbied the government for public funding of its three French-language parish schools, although by the 1960s, the organization had adjusted its platform, instead lobbying for a public secularized French language schools. FFCB lobbying efforts eventually led to the creation of Programme cadre de français in 1978, where French first language classes would be held in English-language schools.

The passage of the Canadian Charter of Rights and Freedoms in 1982 saw the FFCB to continue to push for a separately managed school board for the province's French language classes, leading to a lengthy court battle between the provincial government, and the Fédération des parents francophones de la Colombie-Britannique. The resulting case saw the province establish the Conseil scolaire francophone de la Colombie-Britannique in 1995, a school board that manages all public French-language elementary and secondary schools in the province.

== Politics ==
Franco-Columbians have historically been represented by the Fédération canadienne-française de la Colombie-Britannique. Conversely, governmental relations with the francophone community is handled through the Francophone Affairs Program, a division of the Intergovernmental Relations Secretariat, which forms a part of the office of the Premier of British Columbia. In addition to facilitating relations between the government and Franco-Columbians, the program also provides funding for francophone programs and services. However, no legislative framework exists for French language services outside of the province's public education system.

=== Judicial access ===
The judicial system of the province formally does not have an official language in place, although in practice the judiciary functions as an English-language institution. Practically speaking, access to francophone court proceedings in British Columbia was only provided for criminal cases, as mandated by section 530 of the Criminal Code, a federal statute.

In 2019, the Supreme Court of Canada ruled in Bessette v British Columbia that individuals charged with a provincial offence in British Columbia have a right to a trial in either English or French. The ruling was not based on the Constitution of Canada, but interpretation of provincial law governing trials for provincial offences. The Supreme Court found that the relevant provincial statutes had no explicit provisions on the language of trials for provincial offences. However, the Supreme Court found that the person accused of an offence under BC provincial law would have the right to a trial in either official language as provided under the Criminal Code; as section 133 of British Columbia's Offence Act defers to the Criminal Code for procedural and trial governance issues not addressed by provincial law – such as language.

== Education ==
=== Elementary and secondary ===
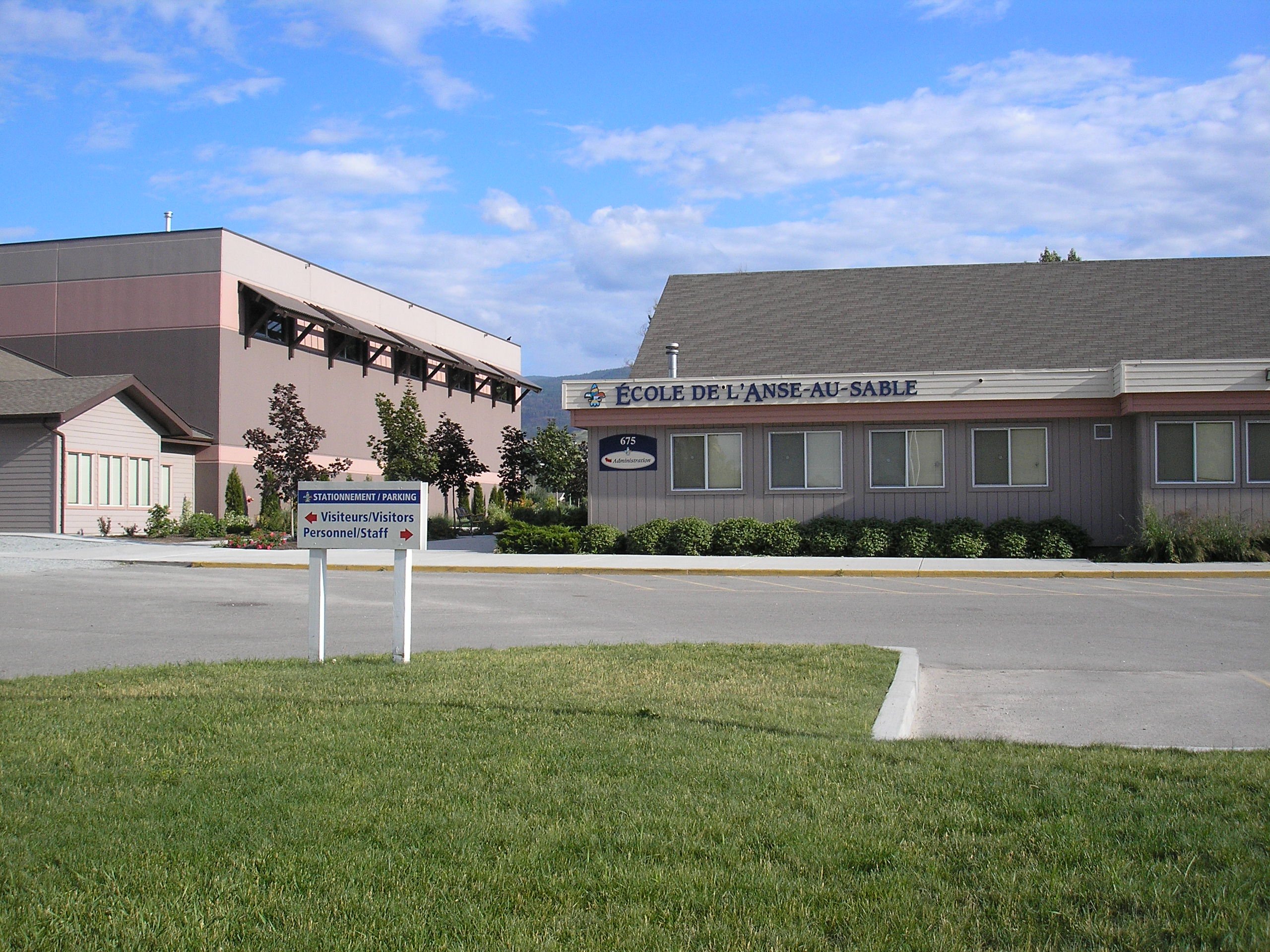
École L'Anse-au-sable is one of 40 French-language public schools in the province

French language schools were first established by Roman Catholic missionaries in the mid-19th century, although they were later displaced by English-language schools in the 1850s. Elementary and secondary French language schooling was not publicly funded in British Columbia until 1978, when the provincial government established the Programme cadre de français, which provided for French first language classes within an English school board. The province's public French language school system was split from the English school boards in 1995, and amalgamated into a single independent school board, the Conseil scolaire francophone de la Colombie-Britannique. French-language rights for resident elementary and secondary school students in Canada, including British Columbia, is afforded through Section 23 of the Canadian Charter of Rights and Freedoms.

Conseil scolaire francophone de la Colombie-Britannique presently operates 40 schools throughout the province. (Note: The school board maintains 40 schools that either provides elementary education, secondary education, or both.) Most schools operated by the school board are housed in their own facilities, although several schools share facilities with their English-language counterparts. During the 2016–17 academic year, there were nearly 6,000 students enrolled in British Columbia's public francophone elementary and secondary school system. In addition to public elementary and secondary school, a number of private schools also operate with French as the primary instructional language. The province hosts an active chapter of Canadian Parents for French (BC-Yukon Branch).

=== Post-secondary ===
British Columbia has one French-language post-secondary college, Educacentre College. The private college operates campuses in Prince George, Victoria, and Vancouver.

There is no francophone or bilingual (in English and French) university in British Columbia. Simon Fraser University does offer five degree programmes that can be completed entirely in the French language, although the university as a whole is considered an anglophone institution.

== Culture ==
The francophone community and culture in British Columbia has historically been associated with French Canadians and Catholicism, although secularization of society, and francophone migrants from Africa, and Asia in the latter half of the 20th century led to a diversification of the community. As a result of the diversification, the term Franco-Columbian became less prevalent by the end of the 20th century, with the provincial government opting to use the more inclusive term francophone community.

In addition to Coquitlam's annual Festival du Bois, Canadian Parents for French host an annual French Celebration Week, Francapalooza, a French film festival and French-language youth camps targeting both Francophone and French immersion students. L'Association des Ecrivains de la Colombie Britannique publishes a monthly youth magazine called La Moustique. A French-language theatre group called Théâtre la Seizième is also active in the province as well as the dance troupes Danseurs du Pacifique and Les Cornouillers, and the annual BC Francophone Games. The Conseil Culturel et Artistique de la Colombie Britannique serves as a community organization in the area of arts and culture. The Calendrier francophone de la Colombie-Britannique is the province's online french-language event calendar, which was founded in 2016 by Ashton Ramsay.

== Media ==
=== Broadcast ===
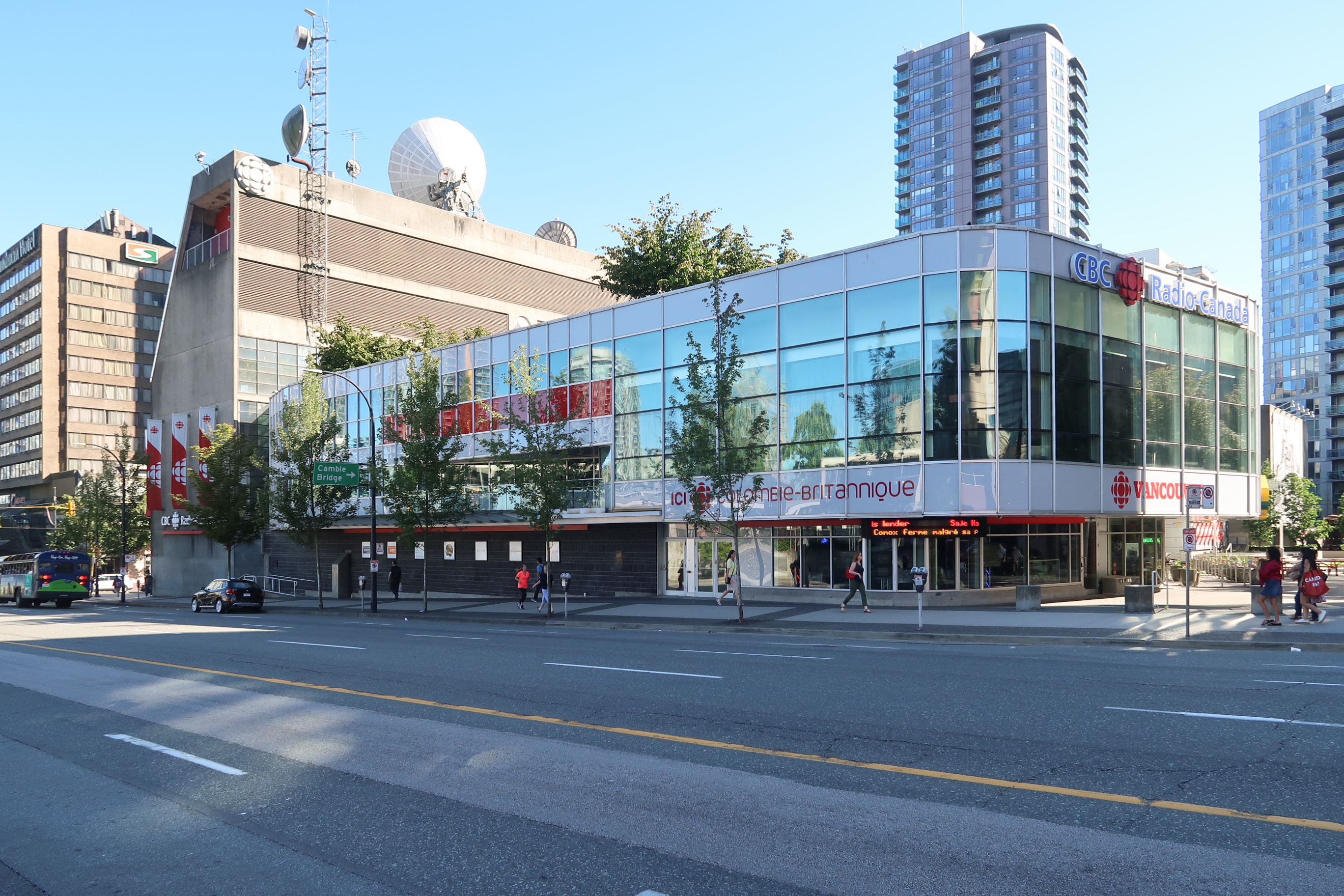
CBC Regional Broadcast Centre Vancouver houses the studios for Radio-Canada, a federal French language public broadcaster

Vancouver-based television station CBUFT-DT broadcasts throughout the province via cable, satellite and IPTV, as do French-language radio stations CBUF-FM (Première Chaîne) and, to a lesser extent, CBUX-FM (Espace musique). Other French-language media such as CBC's Ici RDI, TV5 and MusiquePlus are also available but not locally based. TVA's owned-and-operated station in Montreal (CFTM-DT) is also available on basic cable.

The Société radio communautaire Victoria, started in 1999 as an offshoot of the Société francophone de Victoria, was incorporated in 2004 and started on-air FM radio programming on 7 November 2007 non-stop as CILS-FM at 107.9 MHz and 250 watts.

=== Print ===
Between 1968 and 1998, the province had a newspaper called Le Soleil de la Colombie-Britannique. A digitized version of the complete run of the newspaper is available online. There is now a newspaper published out of Vancouver called L'Express du Pacifique.

== Notable Franco-Columbians ==
- Richard Stewart, mayor of the city of Coquitlam and former minister.
- Jean-Luc Bilodeau, actor (born 1990)
- Sébastien Bordeleau, hockey player (born 1975)
- Modeste Demers, Canadian missionary and first Bishop of Vancouver Island (1809–1871)
- Grimes, musician (born 1988)
- Henri-Gustave Joly de Lotbinière, premier of Québec and later Lieutenant Governor of British Columbia (1829–1908)
- Georges Payrastre, television producer
- El Phantasmo (born 1986), professional wrestler
- Marguerite-A. Primeau, Franco-Albertan writer who spent most of her writing career in Vancouver (born 1914)
- Denise Savoie, politician (born 1943)
- Lucille Starr, Franco-Manitoban and resident of Maillardville (1938–2020)
- Emmanuelle Vaugier, actress (born 1976)
- Françoise Yip, comedian (born 1972 to a Chinese-Canadian father and a Québécois mother)

== See also ==
- List of francophone communities in British Columbia
- French Canadians
  - Acadians, French-speaking Quebecer, Franco-Albertan, Franco-Manitoban, Franco-Newfoundlander, Franco-Ontarians, Fransaskois, Franco-Ténois, Franco-Yukonnais
