= Franco-Manitoban =

Ethnic and linguistic group in Manitoba, Canada

Franco-Manitobans
Franco-Manitobains
- Franco-Manitoban flag

Total population
- French ethnicity: 148,810 (2016); Francophones: 40,975 (2016)

Regions with significant populations
- Manitoba (Winnipeg Metro Region, Eastman Region)

Languages
- Canadian French · Canadian English · Franglais

Religion
- Predominantly Christian (Roman Catholicism, other denominations)

Related ethnic groups
- French Canadians (Acadians · Franco-Albertan · Franco-Columbian · Franco-Ontarian · Franco-Newfoundlander · Franco-Ténois · Franco-Yukonnais · Fransaskois · Québécois) · French · French Americans · Métis

Franco-Manitobans (French: Franco-Manitobains) are French Canadians or Canadian francophones living in the province of Manitoba. According to the 2016 Canadian Census, 40,975 residents of the province stated that French was their mother tongue. In the same census, 148,810 Manitobans claimed to have either full or partial French ancestry. There are several Franco-Manitoban communities throughout Manitoba, although the majority are based in either the Winnipeg Capital Region or the Eastman Region.

The first francophones to enter the region were fur traders during the late 17th century, with the first French settlers arriving in the subsequent century. Francophones constituted the majority of the region's non-First Nations population until the mid 19th century, when anglophones became the linguistic majority. In 1869, the Red River Rebellion was sparked by a group of Métis francophones, eventually resulting in the admittance of the Red River Colony as a bilingual province of Canada. However, the provincial government moved to revoke the linguistic rights accorded to francophones late 19th and early 20th centuries. Restoration of these linguistic rights did not begin until 1970, when French was made an official language of its public education system. The linguistic rights of Franco-Manitobans was also furthered as a result of several decisions made by the Supreme Court of Canada during the 1970s to 1990s.

== Demographics ==
According to the 2016 Canadian Census, the number of people that reported French as a mother tongue in Manitoba was 46,055 (or 3.7 per cent of the population), making it the most common mother tongue in the province after English, German, and Tagalog. The majority of Franco-Manitobans are bilingual in English and French, with only 1,485 respondents (0.1 per cent of Manitobans) in the 2016 census reporting they only had proficiency in the French language. There were 108,455 Manitobans or 8.6 per cent of the population that reported that they were bilingual in English and French, although that figure includes Manitobans that speak French as a second language.

Nearly three quarters of all Franco-Manitobans (74 per cent of the population) were born in the province. Approximately 15 per cent of francophones in Manitoba were born in Canada outside of Manitoba; while the remaining francophones that reside in the province were born outside the country. Among French-speaking Manitobans that were born abroad, approximately 57 per cent originated from Africa, and 28 per cent originated from Europe.

In the 2016 census, 148,810 Manitobans reported having partial or full French ancestry.

=== Communities ===
Francophone communities in Manitoba are concentrated in southern Manitoba, along corridors that follow the Seine and Red River of the North towards Lake Manitoba. Four out of five francophones in Manitoba reside in either the Winnipeg Capital Region or Eastman Region: 58 per cent in the Winnipeg Capital Region, 22 per cent in Eastman Region. Approximately 90 per cent of all Franco-Manitobans live within an hour's drive from Winnipeg.

There also exist francophone communities outside those regions, including Notre-Dame-de-Lourdes, St. Claude, Sainte Rose du Lac, and St. Laurent. Including the capital, there are 15 communities in the province that are officially designated as bilingual areas.

== History ==
The first French speakers to visit Manitoba occurred in the 1660s, with French fur traders and explorers exploring the region around Hudson's Bay. However, the first attempts by francophones to settle the area did not occur until the 1730s, with French explorer Pierre Gaultier de Varennes, sieur de La Vérendrye and his sons establishing a permanent presence in southern Manitoba. A number of francophone fur traders married à la façon du pays, wedding First Nations wives whose children eventually developed a unique Métis identity. Until the mid-19th century, fur traders continued to encompass the majority of Europeans in the region, with francophone French Canadians and Métis constituting the majority of the region's population.

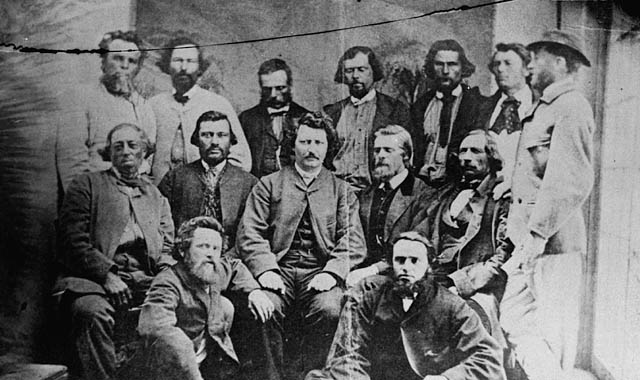
Members of the Red River provisional government established in 1870, which included a number of francophone Métis. The provisional government pressured the Canadian government to guarantee certain Métis and francophone rights in Manitoba.

In 1869, the government of Canada dispatched surveyors to survey Rupert's Land, with the transfer of the territory expected to occur in the next year. However, Louis Riel and a group of Métis took control of Red River Colony, and declared a provisional government; refusing entry to Canadian government surveyors and resulting in the Red River Rebellion. The provisional government provided a list of terms for the colony's entry into Canadian Confederation, including land provisions for the Métis, and linguistic and religious rights for its francophone Catholic population. The Canadian government eventually consented to the terms, with Manitoba formally made a province of confederation in the Manitoba Act in 1870, with English and French made the province's official language.

In 1871, there were about 5,500 francophones in the province almost all of whom were Métis, and comprised more than half of the province's population. However within the next ten years, francophones became a demographic minority in Manitoba as settlers from Ontario moved into the province in large numbers. In 1890, the provincial government moved to remove the linguistic rights of francophones, with the Legislative Assembly of Manitoba passing an Act that made the English language the sole official language of the province.

In the same year, the province moved to eliminate its separate school system, used predominantly by the francophone Catholic population of Manitoba. The resulting issue, the Manitoba Schools Question, became a contentious national issue between English and French Canada. In 1896, the provincial and federal governments reached a compromise in which the separate school system would not be re-instituted, but religious and French language instruction would take place in the secular school system under certain conditions, and where francophone numbers warranted it.

French language instruction continued to be permitted until March 1916, when the provincial legislature passed the Thornton Act, which repealed the aforementioned compromise, and forbade the use of any language other than English as the language of instruction in schools. The following act was passed in an effort to homogenize the province with English as its dominant language, after it received an influx of migrants from non-English speaking countries. After the Thornton Act was passed, the Association d’éducation des Canadiens français du Manitoba (AÉCFM) was formed by the Roman Catholic clergy, serving as a shadow ministry of education for Franco-Manitobans. The AÉCFM provided financial assistance for prospective francophone teachers, and encouraged francophone teachers to continue providing French language instruction illicitly. Francophone teachers who were able to continue teaching the French language were largely aided by the fact that the trustees of several school boards were effectively francophone-controlled. Additionally, many school inspectors that were sent to enforce the Thornton Act ignored infractions by francophone teachers; as they often relied on the AÉCFM to support their positions as inspectors.

Formally however, French language instruction was not reintroduced in Manitoba's public school system until 1947, when it was introduced as a second language for secondary schools, and in 1955 for elementary schools. Use of the French language to teach other subjects was introduced in 1967, with teachers permitted to use the language for half of the school day. French would formally be reestablished as an official language of the provincial education system in 1970.

Exterior of the Supreme Court of Canada building. During the latter half of the 20th century, the supreme court made a number of decisions that guaranteed the linguistic rights of Franco-Manitobans.

An issue regarding the province's official language emerged during the late 1970s, when a francophone Métis received a parking ticket written only in English. The case served as a basis for a successful constitutional challenge, where the Supreme Court of Canada ruled that the 1890 act that made English the only language of the legislature, and judiciary, was unconstitutional, as it conflicted with section 23 of the Manitoba Act. The decision effectively made the province a bilingual province again. However, the provincial government continued to move slowly in re-instituting bilingual programs, resulting in another Franco-Manitoban to use his own parking ticket to launch a legal challenge that all legislation from 1890 to 1979 passed only in English were unconstitutional. The resulting challenge caused significant tension between anglophones and Franco-Manitobans, with the Société franco-manitobaine offices firebombed in 1983. A reference question was eventually posed to the supreme court, who ruled in Reference Re Manitoba Language Rights, that all legislation not printed in English and French were invalid; although did provide the provincial government a grace period to correct any unilingual documents.

Another supreme court decision in 1993 ruled that francophone minority were afforded the right to manage and control their own educational facilities. In order to comply with the supreme court's ruling, the Public Schools Amendment (francophone Schools Governance) Act was passed, establishing the Franco-manitoban School Division in 1994.

In 2016, the Francophone Community Enhancement and Support Act was passed with unanimous support, and no vocal opposition from the anglophone majority of Manitoba, signalling the acceptance of francophone linguistic rights within the province.

== Politics ==
The official language of the judiciary and legislature of Manitoba is English and French, under section 23 of the Manitoba Act. The following section does not extend toward provincial government services. However, efforts to provide French language services have been undertaken since the province's first French language policy was instituted in 1989, with French language access to provincial services available in areas where numbers warrant it.

The Francophone Affairs Secretariat serves as the main liaison between the provincial government and the Franco-Manitoban community. Conversely, the Société de la francophonie manitobaine serves as the main advocacy and lobby group for Franco-Manitobans.

== Education ==
=== Elementary and secondary ===
French language education rights for minority francophone populations in Canada is guaranteed under section 23 of the Canadian Charter of Rights and Freedoms, in addition to section 23 of the Manitoba Act.

However, French language instruction was formally banned from the province from 1916 to 1947; although instruction of the language continued in some schools illicitly. French was reintroduced as an official language of the public education system in 1970, with Franco-Manitobans given the right to control and manage school boards independent from their anglophone peers in 1993. During the 1970s, the provincial government established the Bureau de l’Éducation française, and the office of the Deputy Minister of French Education to oversee French language education.

The province's public francophone schools are administered by the Franco-manitoban School Division, which had an enrolment of nearly 5,400 children throughout 23 schools during the 2015–16 academic year. (Note: The school board maintains 23 schools that either provides elementary education, secondary education, or both.)

=== Post-secondary ===
The Université de Saint-Boniface, located in Winnipeg, is western Canada's only francophone post-secondary university. The institution operates as an affiliated university of the publicly-funded University of Manitoba. In 2016 there were approximately 2,000 students enrolled with the Université de Saint-Boniface.

== Culture and media ==
The Franco-Manitoban community is served by Radio-Canada's CKSB (Ici Radio-Canada Première), CKSB-FM (Ici musique) and CBWFT-DT (Ici Radio-Canada Télé), the community radio station CKXL-FM and the weekly newspaper La Liberté.

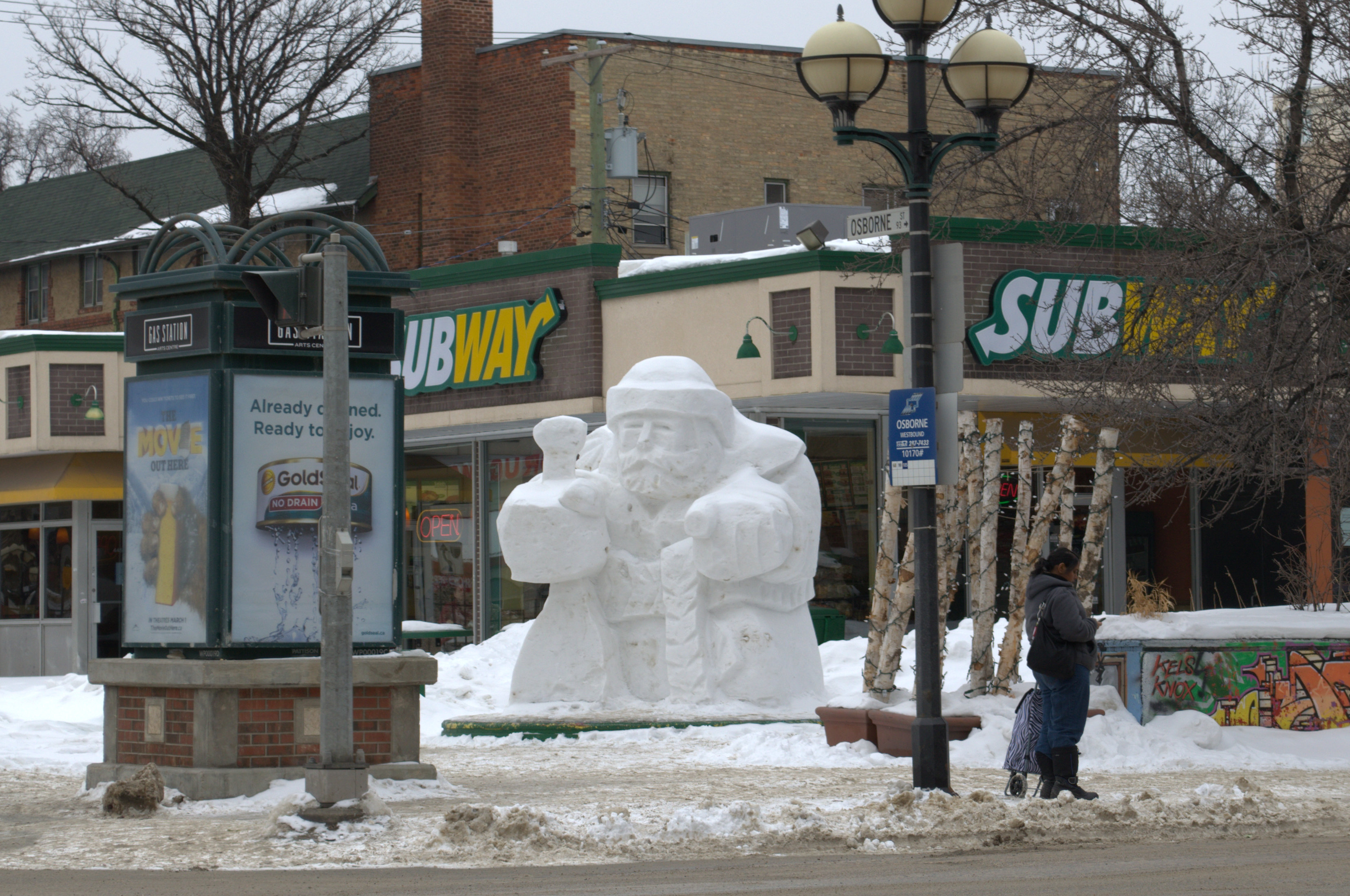
An ice sculpture crafted for the Festival du Voyageur, a festival that celebrates Franco-Manitoban culture.

In 1925, the Franco-Manitoban community founded Le Cercle Molière. It is the oldest French-language theatre organization in Canada.

The Festival du Voyageur, held annually since 1970 in Saint-Boniface, is a major celebration in the Franco-Manitoban community. Cinémental is an annual French-language film festival, staged at the Centre culturel Franco-Manitobain in Winnipeg.

== See also ==
- French Canadians
  - Acadians, French-speaking Quebecer, Franco-Albertan, Franco-Columbian, Franco-Newfoundlander, Franco-Ontarian, Fransaskois, Franco-Ténois, Franco-Yukonnais
- Le Musée de Saint-Boniface Museum
- Franco-Manitoban School Division, the Francophone school district operating public schools throughout the province
- Métis French
