= Franco-Ténois =

Community of francophones in Northwest Territories, Canada

- Franco-Ténois flag

Regions with significant populations
- Mainly Yellowknife.

Languages
- Canadian French, Canadian English, Franglais

Religion
- Mainly Roman Catholic

Related ethnic groups
- Franco-Albertans, Franco-Columbians, Franco-Ontarians, Fransaskois, French Canadians, Québécois, Acadians, Cajuns, French Americans, Métis, French

Franco-Ténois, originating from the acronym TNO, the French term for the Northwest Territories of Canada (Territoires du Nord-Ouest), refers to the community of francophones who reside in the Northwest Territories.

== History ==
Francophones have a long history in the region. The first person of European descent to reach the Great Slave Lake was a francophone, Laurent Leroux. In 1786, Leroux built the trading post Fort Resolution and in 1790 he founded the original Fort Providence, 20 km from the modern-day city of Yellowknife. At the time the Northwest Territories were brought under the jurisdiction of the Government of Canada, 47% of the non-native population spoke French. French permeated every aspect of life in the Territories, from commerce to education. However, in 1892, the Northwest Territories (which at the time covered the Canadian Prairies west of Southern Manitoba) abolished French as an official language. In 1984, its status as an official languages was restored in the Canadian territories.

== French in the Northwest Territories ==
As of the 2006 census, only 440 residents of the Territories, representing 1.1% of the overall population, use French as their home language. The francophone population in the Territories is very mobile, with many residents coming from more settled Francophone communities across the country and eventually leaving to settle elsewhere. While current figures show the average stay of francophones in the region is increasing, the trend towards outward migration continues. The Franco-Ténois also deal with substantial pressures to assimilate, brought on by the isolation of Northwest Territories communities and the existence of a plurality of languages and cultures there among which English takes precedence.

French is currently one of eleven official languages in the Northwest Territories, along with Chipewyan, Cree, English, Gwichʼin, Inuinnaqtun, Inuktitut, Inuvialuktun, North Slavey, South Slavey and Tłįchǫ.

In 1984, the Canadian Government, pursuant to the Charter of Rights and Freedoms, introduced a bill in the House of Commons, Bill C-26, which would have made the Territories officially bilingual in French and English. The government of the Northwest Territories strongly objected to the proposed bill and the federal government subsequently dropped the measure. The government of the Northwest Territories then adopted an Official Languages Act in the same year that recognized eight official provincial languages, Inuktitut (which includes Inuvialuktun and Inuinnaqtun), Awokanak or Slavey, Dogrib, Chipewyan, Cree, Gwichʼin, English and French. The government of the Northwest Territories agreed to provide services in French under the condition that the federal government absorb the cost and fund the development of Native communities.

In March 1999, a Forum on French in the Northwest Territories exposed a widespread lack of government services in French. In 2000, the Franco-Ténois Federation, the weekly French newspaper l'Aquilon and five other parties sued the government of the Northwest Territories and the Government of Canada for not adequately applying the Official Languages Act and the Charter of Rights and Freedoms.

== Community ==
The Franco-Ténois Federation (Fédération franco-ténoise) is the primary representative body for the Franco-Ténois community. A network of local organizations was created across the Territories in 1988 to band together isolated pockets of francophone settlement. Other than in Yellowknife, where the largest francophone population resides, local organizations exist in other areas of francophone settlement such as Inuvik, Hay River and Fort Smith. Initially, many of the local associations were created for the simple purpose of obtaining Radio-Canada radio and television broadcasts. The creation of the separate territory of Nunavut has cut off some francophone communities in the new territory from the larger base in the west.

The Franco-Ténois community is served by a weekly French language newspaper, l'Aquilon, which celebrated its 20th anniversary in January 2006. The community is also served with French language radio stations in major communities, and many cultural events across the territories. The francophone theatre troupe, Les pas frette aux yeux, is well known throughout the territories.

Yellowknife is served by CIVR-FM 103.5, a community radio station; and VF2136 97.3 FM, a local Ici Radio-Canada Première repeater owned by L'Association Franco-Culturelle de Yellowknife. Ici Radio-Canada Télé broadcasts in Yellowknife and Hay River through locally owned repeaters.

== Education ==
In 1988, a group of francophone parents in Yellowknife called for the creation of a French first-language education program. The government of the Northwest Territories asserted that the immersion program already in place was more than adequate. The group of parents sued the government, forcing the creation of the first French language program in 1989, with an initial class of nine children. Similar measures followed in Hay River and elsewhere across the Territories. A French school board was created in Yellowknife in 2000.

== The Franco-Ténois flag ==
The Franco-Ténois Flag

The Franco-Ténois flag was created in 1992. It features a sky blue background, representative of la Francophonie, with a curve separating the sky blue from a field of white in the bottom portion of the flag. A polar bear posed passant regardant is perched upon the curve, meant to resemble a snowy hill (in an image reminiscent of the official logo of the Government of the Northwest Territories). The curve itself represents the 60th parallel, above which the Territories are located. The bear looks up at a symbol in the upper right corner of the flag, composed of half a fleur-de-lys (left half) and half a snowflake (right half). This is meant to represent the francophone community and its northern roots in the hyperborean climate of the Territories.

== See also ==
- French Canadians
  - Acadians
  - Franco-Albertan
  - Franco-Columbian
  - Franco-Manitoban
  - Franco-Newfoundlander
  - Fransaskois
  - Franco-Ontarian
  - Franco-Yukonnais
  - Québécois
