= Franco-Yukonnais =

French-speaking residents of Yukon

Total population
- 1,575

Regions with significant populations
- Yukon

Languages
- Canadian French, Canadian English, Franglais

Religion
- Predominantly Roman Catholic

Related ethnic groups
- French Canadians

Franco-Yukonnais (French pronunciation: [fʁɑ̃kojykɔnɛ]) are French Canadian or French-speaking residents of Yukon, a territory of Canada. French has full official language status in the Yukon.

== Demographics ==
The Canada 2016 Census identified 1,575 residents of the territory as francophone, 4.4 percent of the territory's total population. Between 3,500 and 4,000 residents of the territory, or approximately 13 per cent of the total population, are of at least partial French descent.

== Community ==
The primary institution of the Franco-Yukonnais community is the Association Franco-Yukonnaise, a non-profit organization which coordinates many of the community's cultural activities and acts as the community's voice in political and social issues affecting the community.

Franco-Yukonnais are served by the bi-weekly newspaper L'Aurore boréale. The territorial capital, Whitehorse, is served by CFWY-FM, a rebroadcaster of CBUF-FM, the Ici Radio-Canada Première station from Vancouver. This repeater does not originate any programming in the Yukon, nor is it available terrestrially in the rest of the territory outside of Whitehorse; Montreal flagship CBF-FM is available on SiriusXM satellite radio and on satellite television, though its programming is three hours ahead of CBUF-FM. Whitehorse was previously served by a television rebroadcaster of CBUFT, the Vancouver outlet of Télévision de Radio-Canada, until that rebroadcaster closed down in 2012, amid cutbacks that required the shutdown of CBC / Radio-Canada's television translator network. The network, now known as Ici Radio-Canada Télé, is available on cable and satellite.

Unlike the Northwest Territories and Nunavut the Yukon does not have a French language community radio station. Instead, the francophone community is served by a weekly radio show, Rencontres, which airs on CFWH-FM, the territory's CBC Radio One service, in the Saturday afternoon time slot reserved by the network for local cultural magazine shows.

The annual Festival du solstice is held in June each year, with events in both Whitehorse and Dawson City.

== Flag ==
The Franco-Yukonnais Flag was registered in the Canadian Heraldic Authority’s Public Register of Arms, Flags and Badges of Canada on August 15, 2018.

The flag consists of a blue field and three diagonal stripes set from lower hoist to upper fly. The colours of the stripes are white and golden yellow. The flag is formally emblazoned as:

Azure a bendlet sinister Or between to the dexter a bend sinister couped in chief and to the sinister a bend sinister couped in base Argent.

The effect created by the arrangement of the stripes is meant to represent Yukon's many mountains. Blue is for the French people and the sky. White is for winter and snow. Yellow represents the gold rush and the Franco-Yukonnais community's contributions to history of the territory.

== History ==
- In 1840, Robert Campbell explored inland Yukon for the Hudson's Bay Company with the help of French-Canadian guides.
- In 1874, Francophone fur trader François-Xavier Mercier built the Fort Reliance trading post near the mouth of the Klondike River.
- During the Klondike Gold Rush in the late 1800s, Francophones were already well established in the area.
- In the 1980s, the Franco-Yukonnais flag was adopted, and a French school and daycare centre opened.
- In 1982, the Association Franco-yukonnaise was established.
- École Émilie-Tremblay, the first French-language school in the territory, opened in 1984. It is named in honour of one of the first Francophone women from Quebec to have made the long journey to Dawson, Yukon.
- The Commission scolaire francophone du Yukon no 23 is the only school board in Yukon. It officially opened on July 1, 1996, and is responsible for French-language education throughout the territory.
- In 1988, Yukon's Languages Act was passed, and the French Language Services Office was created.
- In 2007, the Yukon government proclaimed May 15 as Yukon Francophonie Day.

== See also ==
- French Canadians
- Acadians
- French-speaking Quebecer
- Franco-Albertans
- Franco-Columbian
- Franco-Manitobans
- Franco-Newfoundlanders
- Franco-Ontarians
- Franco-Ténois
- Fransaskois
