= Albertville, Saskatchewan =

Albertville
- Village
- Village of Albertville
- Location of Albertville in Saskatchewan Albertville (Canada)
- Coordinates: 53.25°N 105.32°W
- Country: Canada
- Province: Saskatchewan
- Region: Central
- Census division: 15

Government
  - Type: Municipal
  - Governing body: Albertville Village Council
  - Mayor: Chris Dunn

Area
  - Land: 1.12 km^{2} (0.43 sq mi)

Population (2016)
  - Total: 86
  - Density: 76.6/km^{2} (198/sq mi)
- Time zone: UTC-6 (CST)
- Postal code: S0J 0A0
- Area code: 306
- Highways: Highway 355
- Railways: None

Albertville (2016 population: 86) is a village in the Canadian province of Saskatchewan within the Census Division No. 15. It is approximately 25 km northeast of the City of Prince Albert.

== History ==
Albertville incorporated as a village on January 1, 1986.

Historical sites

- St. James Roman Catholic Church

== Demographics ==
Population history (1986–2016)
Year	Pop.	±%
1986	127	—
1991	149	+17.3%
1996	122	−18.1%
2001	132	+8.2%
2006	110	−16.7%
2011	140	+27.3%
2016	86	−38.6%
Source: Statistics Canada via Saskatchewan Bureau of Statistics

In the 2021 Census of Population conducted by Statistics Canada, Albertville had a population of 121 living in 53 of its 57 total private dwellings, a change of −14.8% from its 2016 population of 142. With a land area of 1.13 km^{2} (0.44 sq mi), it had a population density of 107.1/km^{2} (277.3/sq mi) in 2021.

In the 2016 Census of Population, the Village of Albertville recorded a population of 86 living in 34 of its 35 total private dwellings, a −62.8% change from its 2011 population of 140. With a land area of 1.12 km^{2} (0.43 sq mi), it had a population density of 76.8/km^{2} (198.9/sq mi) in 2016.

== See also ==
- List of communities in Saskatchewan
- List of francophone communities in Saskatchewan
- List of villages in Saskatchewan
