= Bellegarde, Saskatchewan =

Community in Saskatchewan, Canada

Bellegarde
- Organized hamlet
- Hamlet of Bellegarde
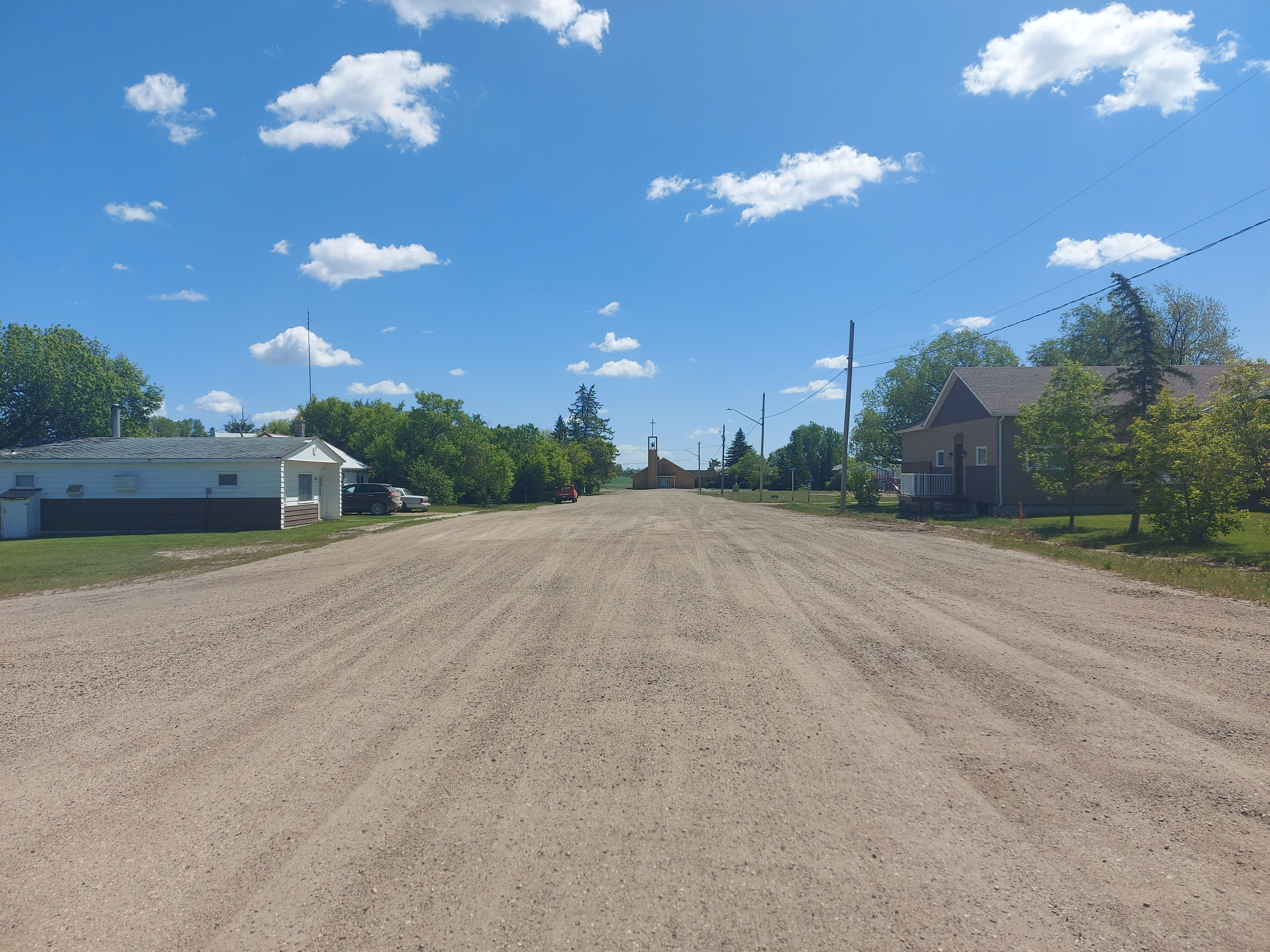
- Avenue Mgr Jean Gaire
- Nickname: St. Maurice de Bellegarde
- Motto: Notre communauté, notre vie
- Location in Saskatchewan
- Coordinates: 49°31′52″N 101°32′52″W
- Country: Canada
- Political divisions of Canada: Saskatchewan
- rural municipalities: Storthoaks No. 31
- Post office Founded: 1898-08-01
  - Summer (DST): CST
- Website: www.acfbellegarde.com

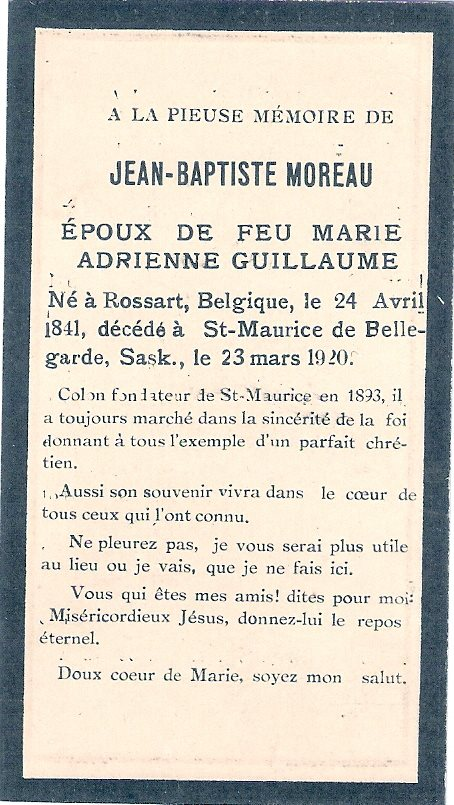

Bellegarde is a French-speaking hamlet in the Rural Municipality of Storthoaks No. 31 in south-eastern Saskatchewan, Canada. It is located just south of Highway 13 (the Red Coat Trail) about 10 kilometres (6.2 mi) west of the Manitoba border. Being a hamlet with fewer than 100 people, the population is counted within the population count of the rural municipality. The community was established in 1898.

== History ==
In July 1888, when Rev. Jean Gaire, a newly arrived young priest from France, founded the parish of Grande-Clairière in Manitoba, St. Maurice of Bellegarde did not exist. By 1891, under the guidance of Father Jean-Isidoire Gaire, settlers residing in Grande-Clairière took homesteads at what they called, "La Quatrième Coulée" or the Fourth Creek.

In 1892, they left full of enthusiasm to settle the Quatrième Coulée with bags and luggage, oxen and plows. After a failed attempt to clear farmland, they returned to Grande-Clairière discouraged.

At the same time, under the direction of Father Gaire, settlers advanced 25 to 30 miles to the west and six miles south, founding the mission of St. Raphael. On his return, Mgr Gaire discovered that Cyrille Sylvestre had taken four homesteads at the Quatrième Coulée with the intention of settling there permanently with his family.

In 1892, more settlers travelled to the Quatrième Coulée. After careful studies from all points of view, these farmers recognized the value in the land. The area quickly won recruits.

In 1889, families arriving at Grande Clairière from Luxembourg, Belgium took up homesteads at St. Maurice.

During the winter of 1893, the Jean-Baptiste Moreau family was the first family to spend the winter as isolated settlers in this area.

In 1894, the Moreau family was joined by other settlers who stayed to break the land. Soon others arrived to reinforce the colony. By 1897–1898, 110 settlers worked and prospered around St. Maurice de Bellegarde.

In 1900, four families from Chicago arrived.

== Demographics ==
In the 2021 Census of Population conducted by Statistics Canada, Bellegarde had a population of 35 living in 14 of its 18 total private dwellings, a change of 16.7% from its 2016 population of 30. With a land area of 0.15 km^{2} (0.058 sq mi), it had a population density of 233.3/km^{2} (604.3/sq mi) in 2021.

== Education ==
=== History ===
In 1903, Mr. Jobin was the first teacher. The rectory served as the school and initially only French was taught. The Sisters of the Cross came to Bellegarde in 1905. They looked after the boarding facilities and taught French and Catholic education for both boys and girls. From France, the Parish of St. Maurice welcomed the services of Sister Salvinie-Eugénie and Sister Thaisie-Marie. Miss A. Boileau taught English.

Mr. Honoré George built the first convent soon after. By fall, it took in its first boarder, Emilia Renard.

By 1912, the rectory served as a dormitory for the boys, supervised by Rev. Napoléon Poirier and Sister Thérèse-Eugénie was in charge of the convent. She encouraged the construction of a new and larger facility which was finished in 1919. The Sisters taught in this school until 1961.

== See also ==
- List of communities in Saskatchewan
- List of hamlets in Saskatchewan
- Organized hamlet
- Block settlement
