= Acadians =

Descendants of French settlers in Acadia

Acadiens (French)
- Modern Acadian flag adopted in 1884

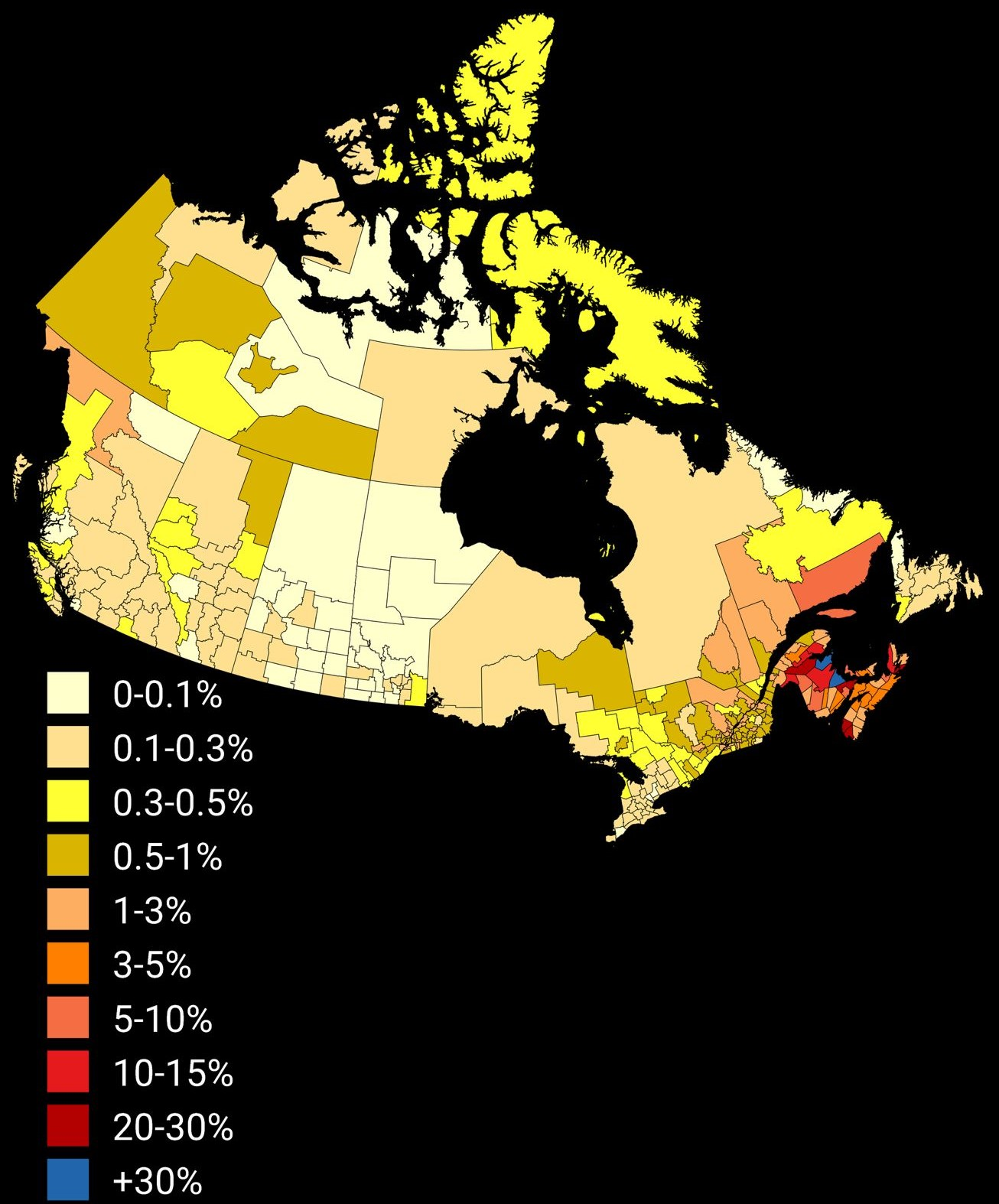
- Population distribution of Acadians by census division, 2021 census

Total population
- ~500,000 (cultural) / ~3,000,000 (ethnic)

Regions with significant populations
- United States ~1,100,000 / Canada ~1,900,000 / France ~20,000
- New Brunswick, Canada: 225,560 (cultural) / ~400,000 (ethnic)
- Louisiana, United States: ~60,000 (cultural) / >500,000 (ethnic)
- Nova Scotia, Canada: 49,205 (cultural) / ~200,000 (ethnic)
- Quebec, Canada: 32,950 (cultural) / >1,000,000 (ethnic)
- Maine, United States: ~30,000 (cultural) / >300,000 (ethnic)
- New England, United States: >100,000 (ethnic)
- Ontario, Canada: <50,000 (ethnic)
- Alberta, Canada: >10,000 (ethnic)
- Prince Edward Island, Canada: <10,000 (ethnic)
- British Columbia, Canada: <10,000 (ethnic)
- Brittany, France: ~3,000 (ethnic)
- Saint Pierre and Miquelon, France: ~3,000 (ethnic)
- Manitoba, Canada: ~1,500 (ethnic)
- Newfoundland and Labrador, Canada: ~1,000 (ethnic)

Languages
- Acadian French (a variety of French with over 300,000 speakers in Canada), Cajun French, English, Chiac, Quebec French or Joual. Franglais

Religion
- Predominantly Roman Catholicism

Related ethnic groups
- French (Saint Pierre and Miquelon Islanders, Poitevin-Saintongeais and Occitans), Cajuns, French-Canadians, Huguenots, Brayons

The Acadians (French: Acadiens, European French: [akadjɛ̃], Acadian French: [akad͡zjɛ̃]) are an ethnic group descended from the French who settled in the New France colony of Acadia during the 17th and 18th centuries. Acadian culture first emerged in and around Port-Royal (present-day Annapolis Royal, Nova Scotia), which served as the principal settlement and administrative centre during much of Acadia's early history. Today, most descendants of Acadians live in either the Northern American region of Acadia, where descendants of Acadians who escaped the Expulsion of the Acadians (known as The Great Upheaval, Le Grand Dérangement) re-settled, or in Louisiana, where thousands of Acadians moved in the late 1700s. Descendants of the Louisiana Acadians are most commonly known as Cajuns, the anglicized term of "Acadian".

Acadia was one of the five regions of New France, located in what is now Eastern Canada's Maritime provinces, as well as parts of Quebec and present-day Maine to the Kennebec River. It was ethnically, geographically and administratively different from the other French colonies such as the French colony of Canada. As a result, the Acadians developed a distinct history and culture. The settlers whose descendants became Acadians primarily came from the west-central region of France, such as the rural areas of Poitou-Charentes. They cluster tightly with west-central French. During the French and Indian War (known in Canada as The Seven Years' War), British colonial officers suspected that Acadians were aligned with France, after finding some Acadians fighting alongside French troops at Fort Beauséjour. Though most Acadians remained neutral during the war, the British, together with New England legislators and militia, carried out the Great Expulsion (Le Grand Dérangement) of the Acadians between 1755 and 1764. They forcefully deported approximately 11,500 Acadians from the maritime region. Approximately one-third perished from disease and drowning. In retrospect, the result has been described as an ethnic cleansing of the Acadians from Maritime Canada.

Acadians speak a variety of French called Acadian French, which has a few regional accents (for example, Chiac in the southeast of New Brunswick, or Brayon in the northwest of New Brunswick). Most can also speak English. The Louisiana Cajun descendants tend to speak English, including Cajun English, or Louisiana French, a relative of Acadian French from Canada, though most have been primarily anglophone since the mid-20th century. Most Acadians in Canada continue to live in majority French-speaking communities, notably those in New Brunswick, where Acadians and Francophones are granted autonomy in areas such as education and health.

Estimates of contemporary Acadian populations vary widely. The Canadian census of 2006 reported only 96,145 Acadians in Canada, based on self-declared ethnic identity. However, the Canadian Encyclopedia estimates that there are at least 500,000 people of Acadian ancestry in Canada, which would include many who declared their ethnic identity for the census as French or as Canadian.

== Pre-deportation history ==
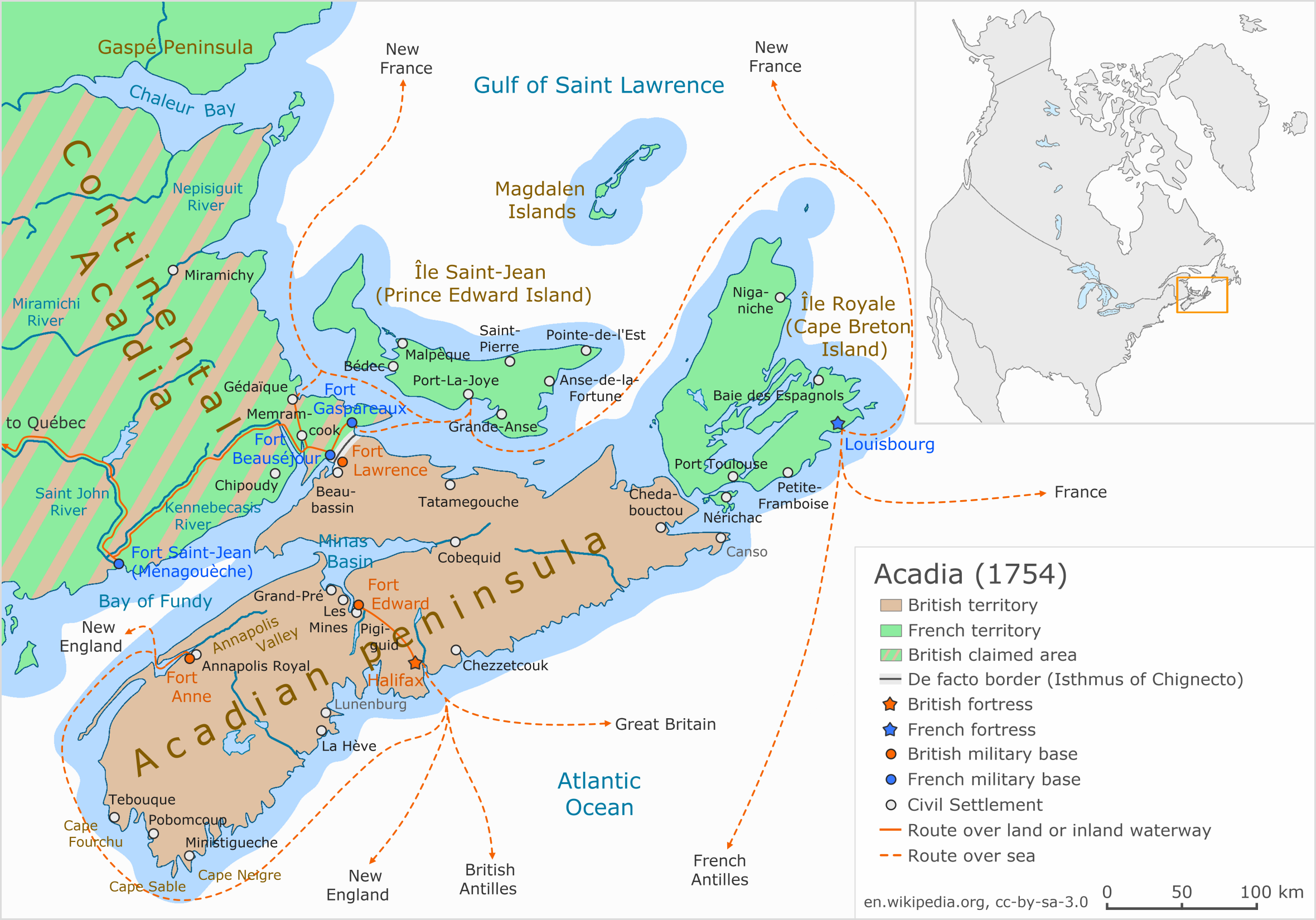
Acadia ( 1754 )

During the early 17th century, about 60 French families were established in Acadia. They developed relations with the peoples of the Wabanaki Confederacy (particularly the regional Mi'kmaq). The Acadians lived mainly in the coastal regions of the Bay of Fundy; they reclaimed farming land from the sea by building dikes to control water and drain certain wetlands.

Living in a contested borderland region between French Canada and the British territories on New England and the coast, the Acadians often became entangled in the conflict between the powers. Their competition in Europe played out in North America as well. Over a period of 74 years, six wars (the four French and Indian Wars, Dummer's War, and Father Le Loutre's War) took place in Acadia and Nova Scotia, in which the Wabanaki Confederacy and some Acadians fought to keep the British from taking over the region. While France lost political control of Acadia in 1713, the Mí'kmaq did not concede land to the British. Along with Acadians, the Mi'kmaq used military force to resist the British. That was particularly evident in the early 1720s during Dummer's War.

The British had conquered Acadia in 1710. Over the next 45 years, the Acadians refused to sign an unconditional oath of allegiance to Britain. Many were influenced by Father Jean-Louis Le Loutre, who from his arrival in 1738 until his capture in 1755, preached against the "English devils". Father Le Loutre led the Acadian people during the Acadian Exodus, as an act of defiance towards British demands and oppression. Acadians took part in various militia operations against the British and maintained vital supply lines to the French Fortress of Louisbourg and Fort Beausejour. During the French and Indian War, the British sought to neutralize any military threat posed by the Acadians and to interrupt the vital supply lines which they provided to Louisbourg by making them sign an oath of allegiance to the crown.

The British founded the town of Halifax and fortified it in 1749 in order to establish a base against the French. The Mi'kmaq resisted the increased number of British (Protestant) settlements by making numerous raids on Halifax, Dartmouth, Lawrencetown, and Lunenburg. During the French and Indian War, the Mi'kmaq assisted the Acadians in resisting the British during the Expulsion of the Acadians.

Many Acadians might have signed an unconditional oath to the British monarchy had the circumstances been better, while other Acadians would not sign because it was religious oath which denied the Catholic faith because the British Monarch was head of the Church of England. Acadians had numerous reasons against signing an oath of loyalty to the British Crown. Acadian men feared that signing the oath would commit them to fighting against France during wartime. They also worried about whether their Mi'kmaq neighbours might perceive an oath as acknowledging the British claim to Acadia rather than that of the Indigenous Mi'kmaq. Acadians believed that if they signed the oath, they might put their villages at risk of attack by the Mi'kmaq.

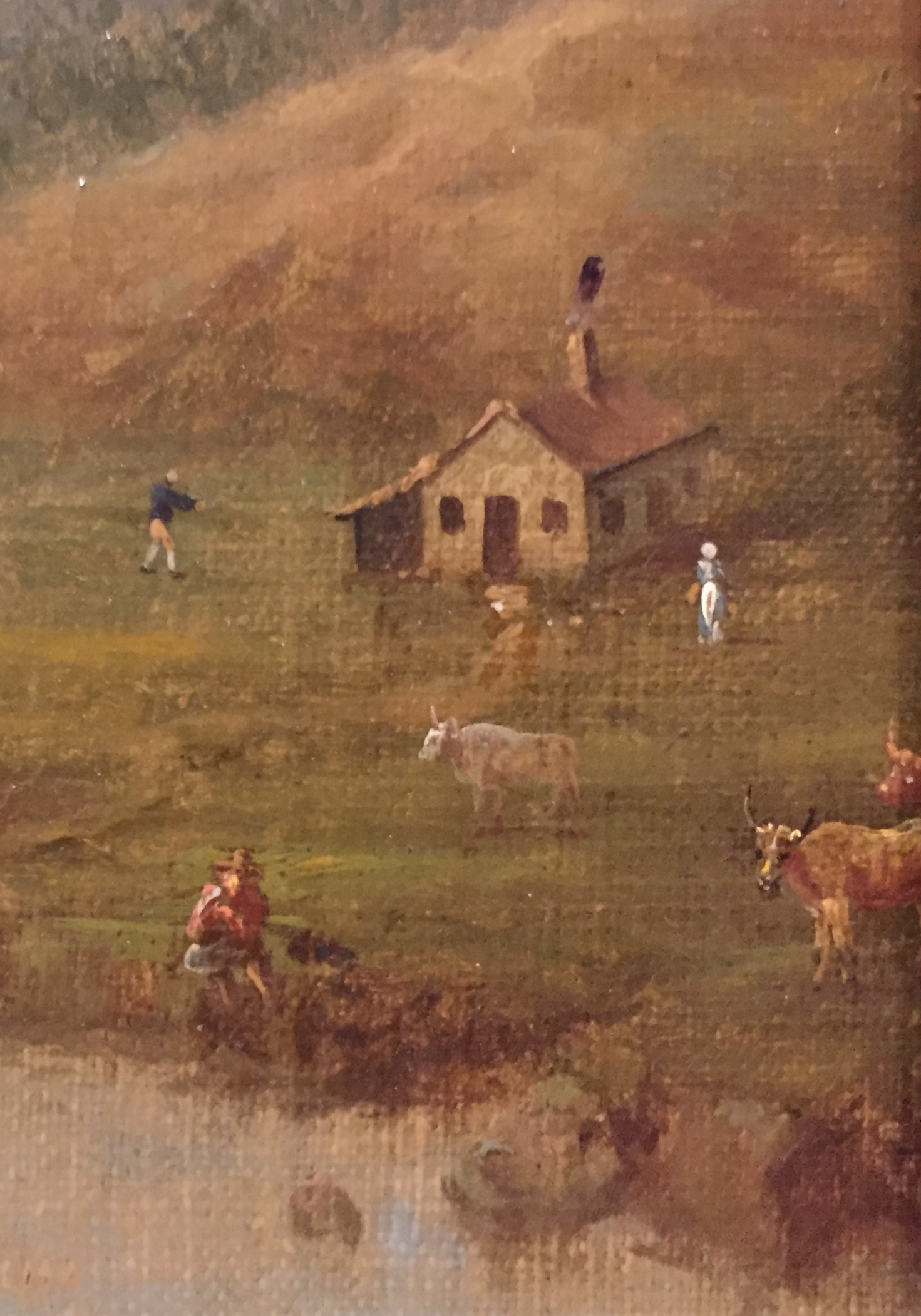
Acadians by Samuel Scott, Annapolis Royal, 1751

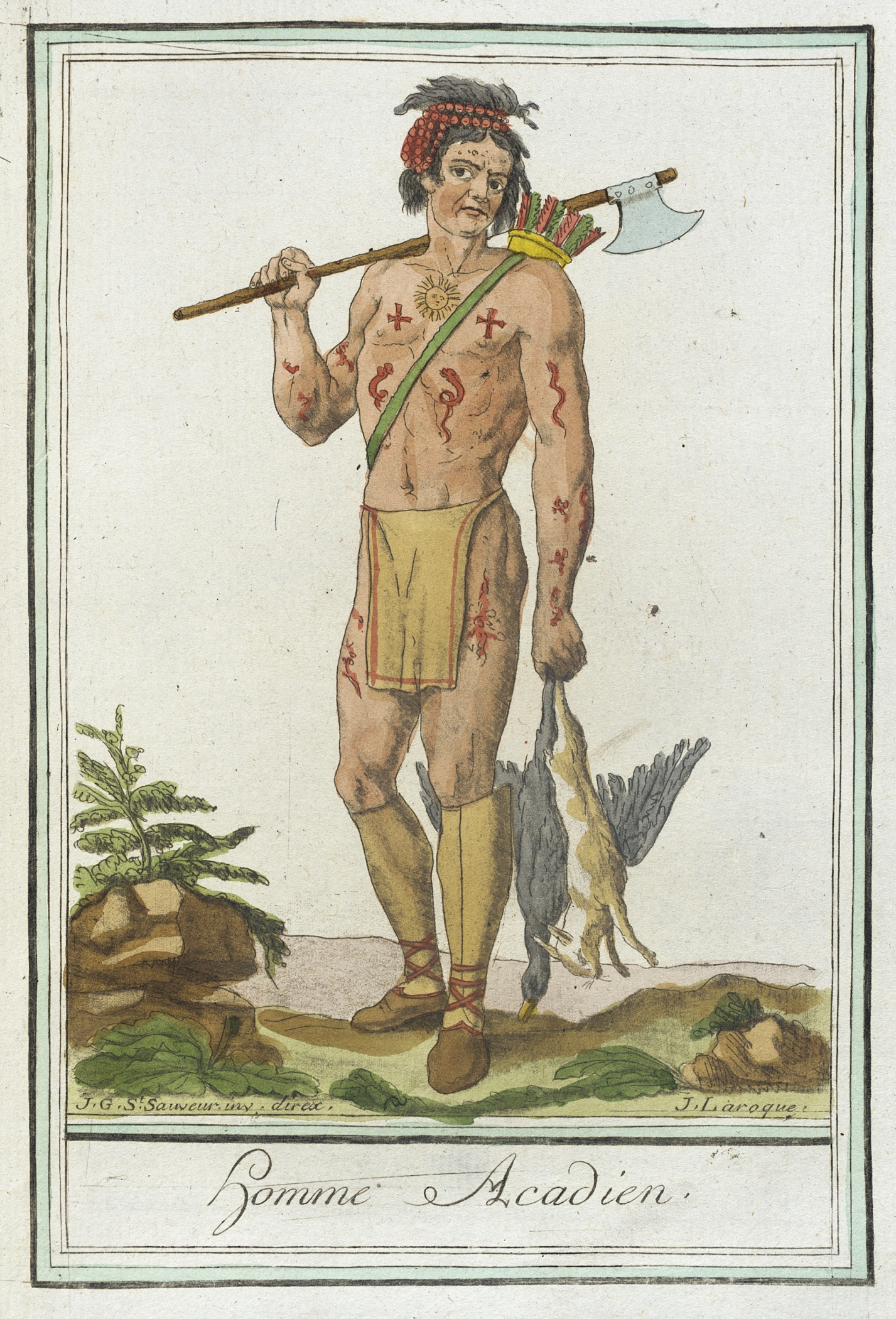
Homme Acadien (Acadian Man) by Jacques Grasset de Saint-Sauveur represents a Mi'kmaq man in the area of Acadia according to the Nova Scotia Museum.

== Deportation ==
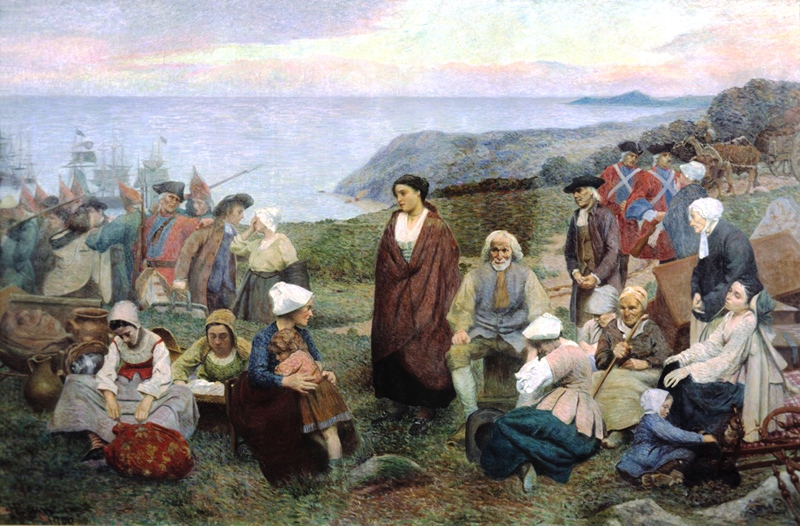
The Deportation of Acadians by Henri Beau

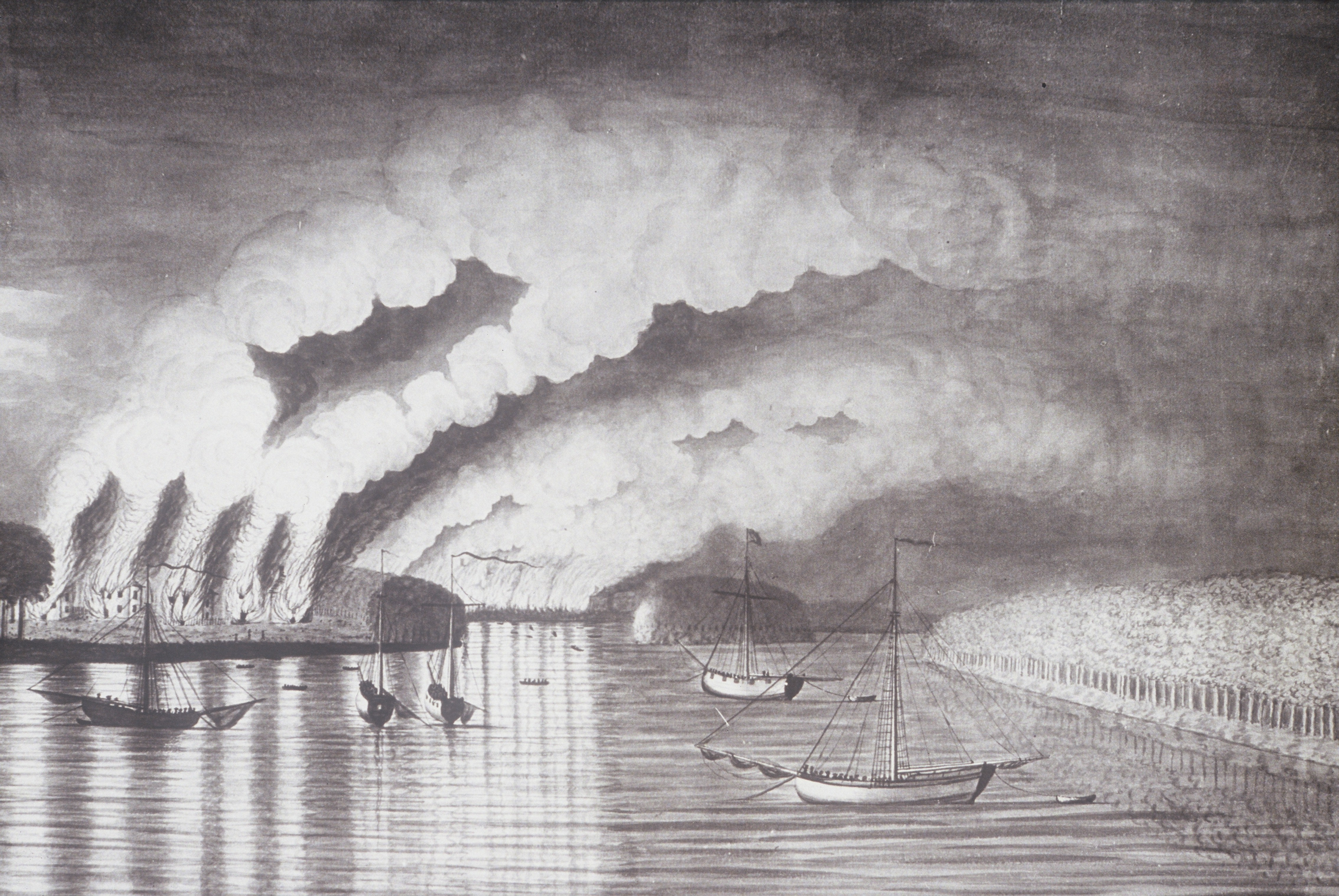
St. John River Campaign: A View of the Plundering and Burning of the City of Grimross (present-day Arcadia, New Brunswick) by Thomas Davies, 1758. This is the only contemporaneous image of the Expulsion of the Acadians.

In the Great Expulsion (known by French speakers as le Grand Dérangement), after the Battle of Fort Beauséjour beginning in August 1755 under Lieutenant Governor Lawrence, approximately 11,500 Acadians (three-quarters of the Acadian population in Nova Scotia) were expelled, families were separated, their lands and property confiscated, and in some cases their homes were burned. The Acadians were deported to separated locations throughout the British eastern seaboard colonies, from New England to Georgia, where many were put into forced labour, imprisoned, or put into servitude.

=== Second wave ===
The British conducted a second and smaller expulsion of Acadians after taking control of the north shore of what is now New Brunswick. After the fall of Quebec and defeat of the French, the British lost interest in such relocations.

Some Acadians were deported to England, some to the Caribbean, and some to France. After being expelled to France, many Acadians were eventually recruited by the Spanish government to migrate to Luisiana (present-day Louisiana). These Acadians settled into or alongside the existing Louisiana Creole settlements, sometimes intermarrying with Creoles, and gradually developed what became known as Cajun culture.

=== Louisiana Acadians ===
After 1758, thousands were transported to France. Most of the Acadians who later went to Louisiana sailed there from France on five Spanish ships. These had been provided by the Spanish Crown, which was eager to populate their Louisiana colony with Catholic settlers who might provide farmers to supply the needs of New Orleans residents. The Spanish had hired agents to seek out the dispossessed Acadians in Brittany and kept this effort secret in order to avoid angering the French king. These new arrivals from France joined the earlier wave expelled from Acadia, and gradually their descendants developed the Cajun population (which included multiracial unions and children) and culture. They continued to be attached to French culture and language, and Catholicism.

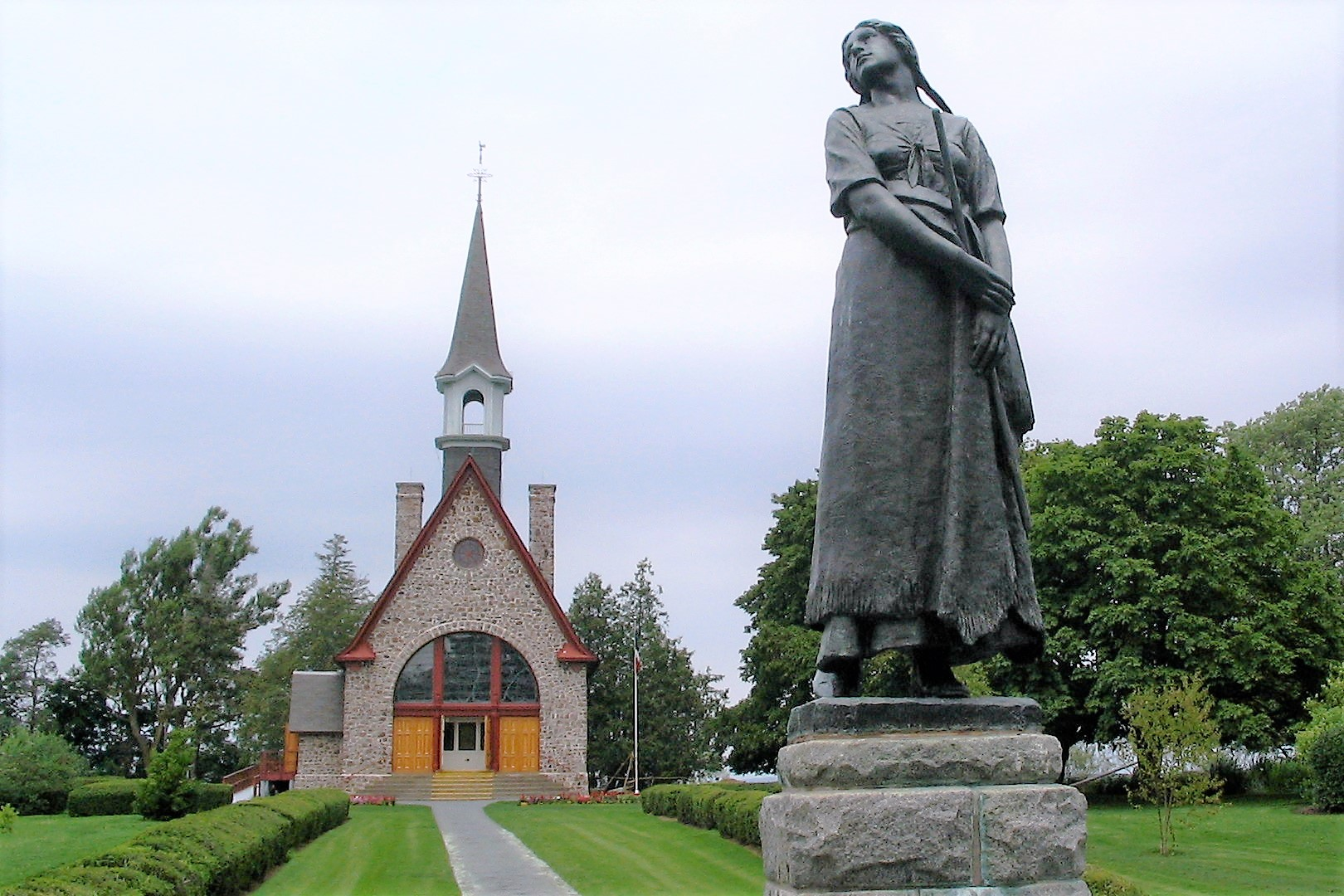
Sculptor Louis-Philippe Hébert's sculpture of Evangeline at the Grand-Pré National Historic Site in Nova Scotia

The Spanish offered the Acadians lowlands along the Mississippi River in order to block British expansion from the east. Some would have preferred Western Louisiana, where many of their families and friends had settled. In addition, that land was more suitable to mixed crops of agriculture. Rebels among them marched to New Orleans and ousted the Spanish governor. The Spanish later sent infantry from other colonies to put down the rebellion and execute the leaders. After the rebellion in December 1769, Spanish Governor O'Reilly permitted the Acadians who had settled across the river from Natchez to resettle along the Iberville or Amite rivers closer to New Orleans.

=== Returnees ===
In time, some Acadians returned to the Maritime provinces of Canada, mainly to New Brunswick and coastal villages that were not occupied by colonists from New England.

The British prohibited them from resettling their lands and villages in what became Nova Scotia. A few of the Acadians in this area had evaded the British for several years, but the brutal winter weather eventually forced them to surrender. Some returnees settled in the region of Fort Sainte-Anne, now Fredericton, but were displaced when the Crown awarded land grants to numerous United Empire Loyalists from the Thirteen Colonies after the victory of the United States in the American Revolution. Most of the descendants of Acadian returnees now live primarily on the eastern coast of New Brunswick, Canada.

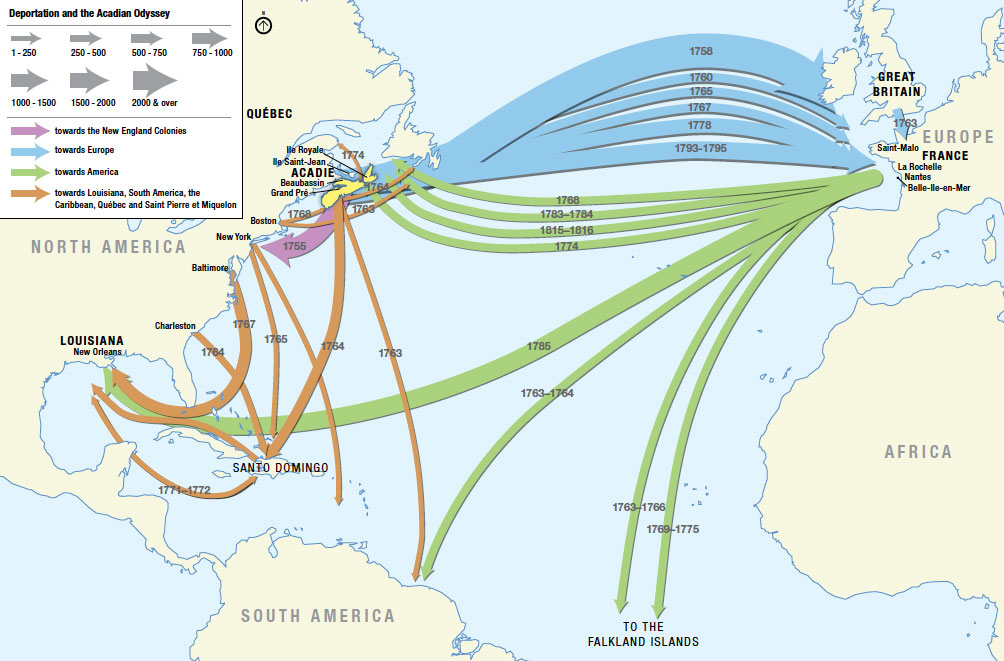
Map of the Deportation/Expulsion of the Acadians (1755–1816)

In 2003, at the request of Acadian representatives, Queen Elizabeth II, Queen of Canada issued a Royal Proclamation acknowledging the deportation. She established 28 July as an annual day of commemoration, beginning in 2005. The day is called the "Great Upheaval" on some English-language calendars.

Before the American Revolutionary War, the Crown settled Protestant European immigrants and New England Planters in former Acadian communities and farmland. After the war, it made land grants in Nova Scotia to Loyalists. British policy was to establish a majority culture of Protestant religions and to assimilate Acadians with the local populations where they resettled.

== Geography ==
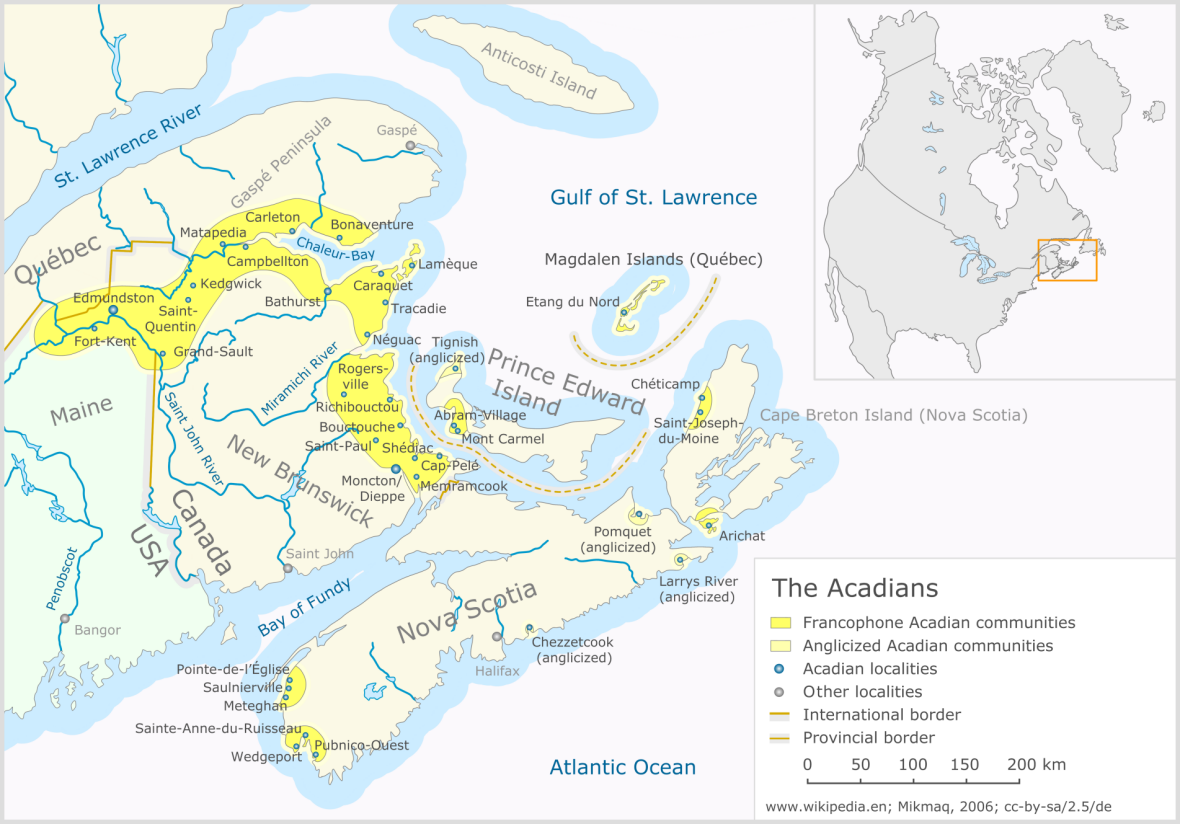
Present-day Acadian communities

The Acadians today live predominantly in the Canadian Maritime provinces (New Brunswick, Prince Edward Island and Nova Scotia), as well as parts of Quebec, Canada, and in Louisiana and Maine, United States.

In New Brunswick, Acadians inhabit the northern and eastern shores of New Brunswick. Other groups of Acadians can be found in the Magdalen Islands and the Gaspé Peninsula. Ethnic Acadian descendants still live in and around the area of Madawaska, Maine, where some of the Acadians first landed and settled in what is now known as the St. John Valley. There are also Acadians in Prince Edward Island and Nova Scotia, at Chéticamp, Isle Madame, and Clare. East and West Pubnico, located at the end of the province, are the oldest regions that are predominantly ethnic Acadian.

Other ethnic Acadians can be found in the southern regions of New Brunswick, Western Newfoundland and in New England. Many of these communities have assimilated to varying degrees into the majority culture of English speakers. For many families in predominantly Anglophone communities, French-language attrition has occurred, particularly in younger generations.

The Acadians who settled in Louisiana after 1764 became known as Cajuns for the culture they developed. They have had a dominant cultural influence in many parishes, particularly in the southwestern area of the state, which is known as Acadiana.

=== Geographical distribution ===
Data from this section from Statistics Canada, 2021.

==== Provinces and territories ====
Province / Territory	Percent Acadians	Total Acadians
Alberta	0.2%	10,110
British Columbia	0.1%	7,025
Manitoba	0.1%	1,465
New Brunswick	14.3%	108,375
Newfoundland and Labrador	0.2%	1,100
Northwest Territories	0.7%	270
Nova Scotia	5.1%	49,205
Nunavut	0.3%	95
Ontario	0.2%	34,125
Prince Edward Island	5.5%	8,265
Quebec	1.0%	83,945
Saskatchewan	0.1%	935
Yukon	0.7%	260
Canada—Total	0.8%	305,175

Today about one third of the population of the officially bilingual province of New Brunswick speaks French as their mother tongue. About half of these are of Acadian ancestry, and there are also many Acadian institutions, organizations and cultural events.

== Culture ==
Acadians are a culturally vibrant minority, particularly in New Brunswick and Nova Scotia, Canada, and in Louisiana (Cajuns) and northern Maine, United States. Since 1994, Le Congrès Mondial Acadien has worked as an organization to unite these disparate communities and help preserve the culture.

In 1881, Acadians at the First Acadian National Convention, held in Memramcook, New Brunswick, designated 15 August, the Christian feast of the Assumption of Mary, as the national feast day of their community. On that day, the Acadians celebrate by having a tintamarre, a big parade and procession for which people dress up with the colors of Acadia and make a lot of noise and music.

The national anthem of the Acadians is "Ave Maris Stella", adopted in 1884 at Miscouche, Prince Edward Island. The anthem was revised at the 1992 meeting of the Société Nationale de l'Acadie. The second, third and fourth verses were translated into French, with the first and last kept in the original Latin.

The Federation des Associations de Familles Acadiennes of New Brunswick and the Société Saint-Thomas d'Aquin of Prince Edward Island have resolved to commemorate 13 December annually as "Acadian Remembrance Day", in memory of the sinking of the Duke William and of the nearly 2,000 Acadians deported from Ile-Saint Jean who died in 1758 while being deported across the North Atlantic: from hunger, disease and drowning. The event has been commemorated annually since 2004; participants mark the day by wearing a black star.

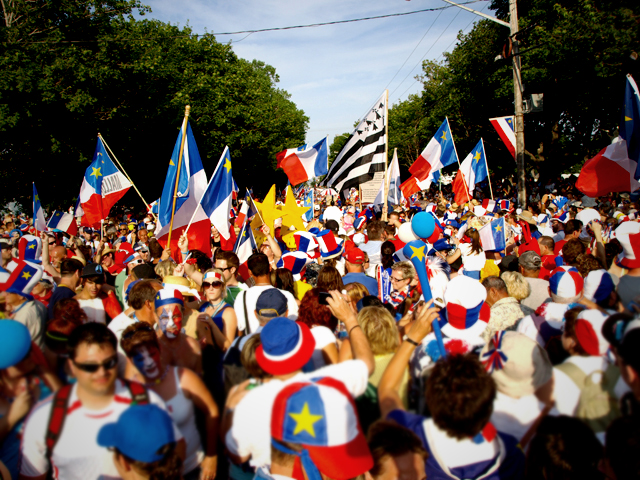
The Tintamarre in Caraquet, New Brunswick

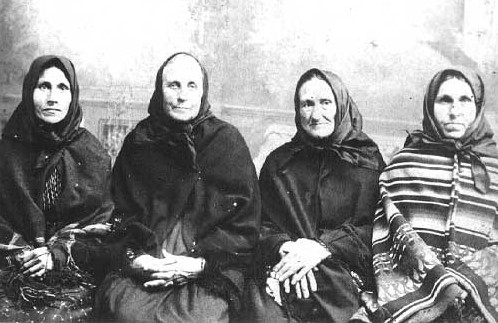
A picture of four Acadian women, 1895

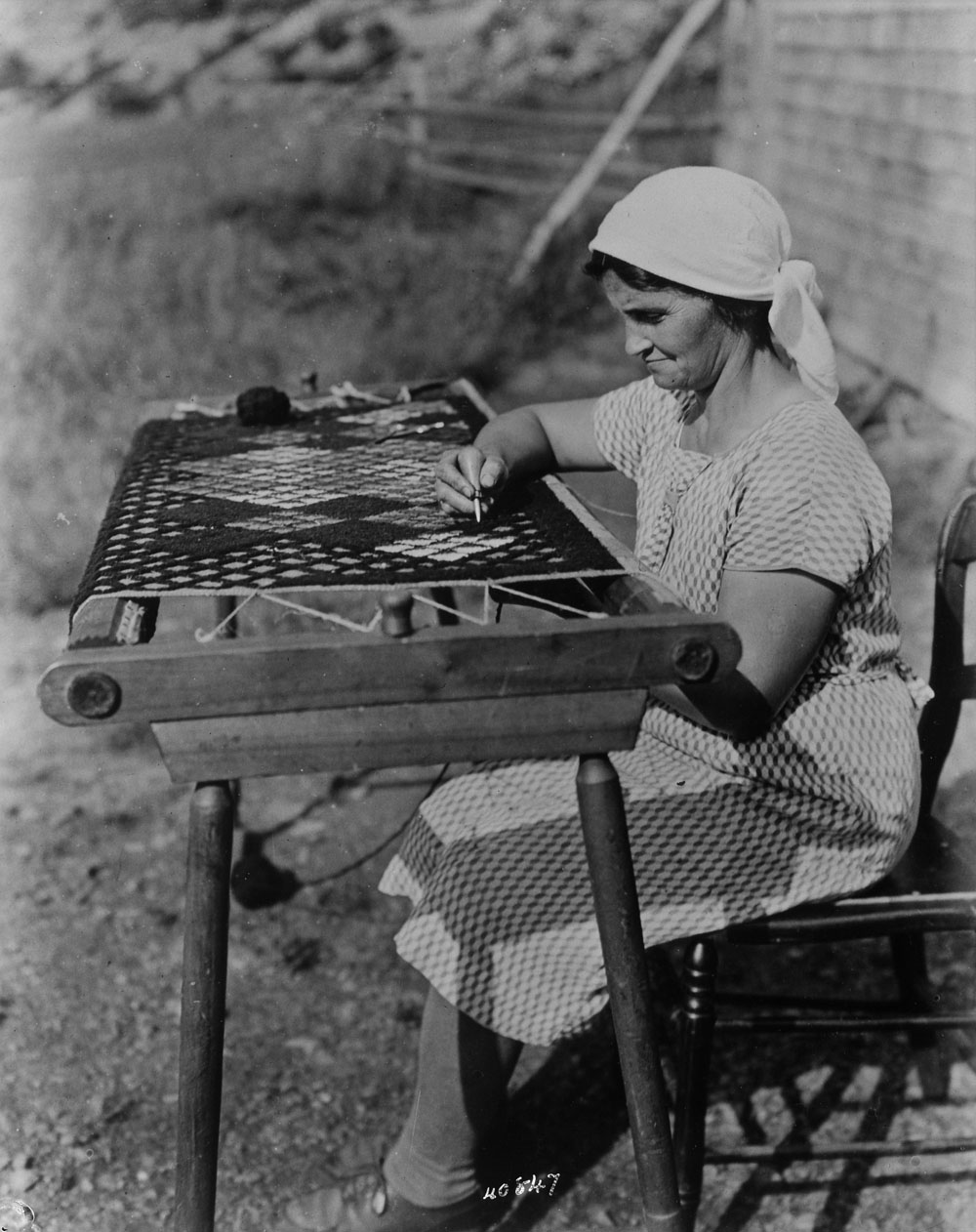
Acadian woman making a rug, 1938

== Legacy ==
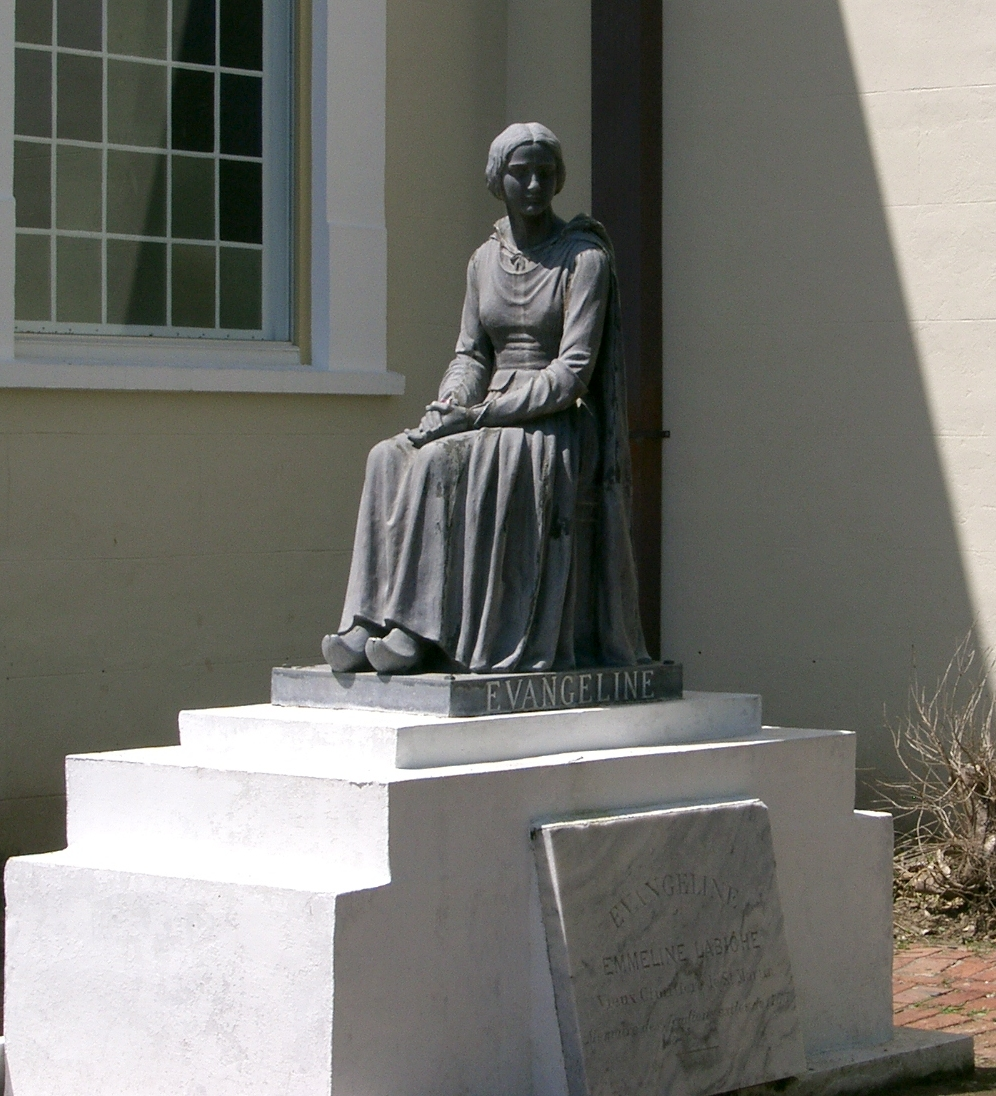
A statue of Longfellow's Evangeline – at St. Martinville, Louisiana

American writer Henry Wadsworth Longfellow published "Evangeline", an epic poem loosely based on the 1755 deportation. The poem became an American classic. Activists used it as a catalyst in reviving a distinct Acadian identity in both Maritime Canada and in Louisiana. Antonine Maillet's novel Pélagie-la-charette concerns the return voyage to Acadia of several deported families, starting 15 years after the Great Expulsion.

In the early 20th century, two statues were made of the fictional figure of Evangeline to commemorate the Expulsion: one was installed in St. Martinville, Louisiana and the other in Grand-Pré, Nova Scotia. The Acadian Memorial (Monument Acadien) has an eternal flame; it honors the 3,000 Acadians who settled in Louisiana after the Expulsion. Monuments to the Acadian Expulsion have been erected at several sites in the Maritime Provinces, such as at Georges Island, Nova Scotia, and at Beaubears Island.

== Flags ==
Flag of the Acadiana region of Louisiana

Flag of the New England Acadians

The flag of the Acadians is the French tricolour, with the addition of a golden star in the blue field (see top of article). This symbolizes Saint Mary, Our Lady of the Assumption, patron saint of the Acadians and widely known as the "Star of the Sea". This flag was proposed by Father Marcel-François Richard and adopted in 1884 at the Second Acadian National Convention, held in Miscouche, Prince Edward Island.

Acadians in the diaspora have adopted other symbols. The flag of Acadians in Louisiana, known as Cajuns, was designed by Thomas J. Arceneaux of the University of Louisiana at Lafayette. In 1974, it was adopted by the Louisiana legislature as the official emblem of the Acadiana region. The state has supported the culture, in part because it has attracted cultural and heritage tourism.

In 2004 New England Acadians, who were attending Le Congrès Mondial Acadien in Nova Scotia, endorsed a design by William Cork for a New England Acadian flag.

== Prominent Acadians ==
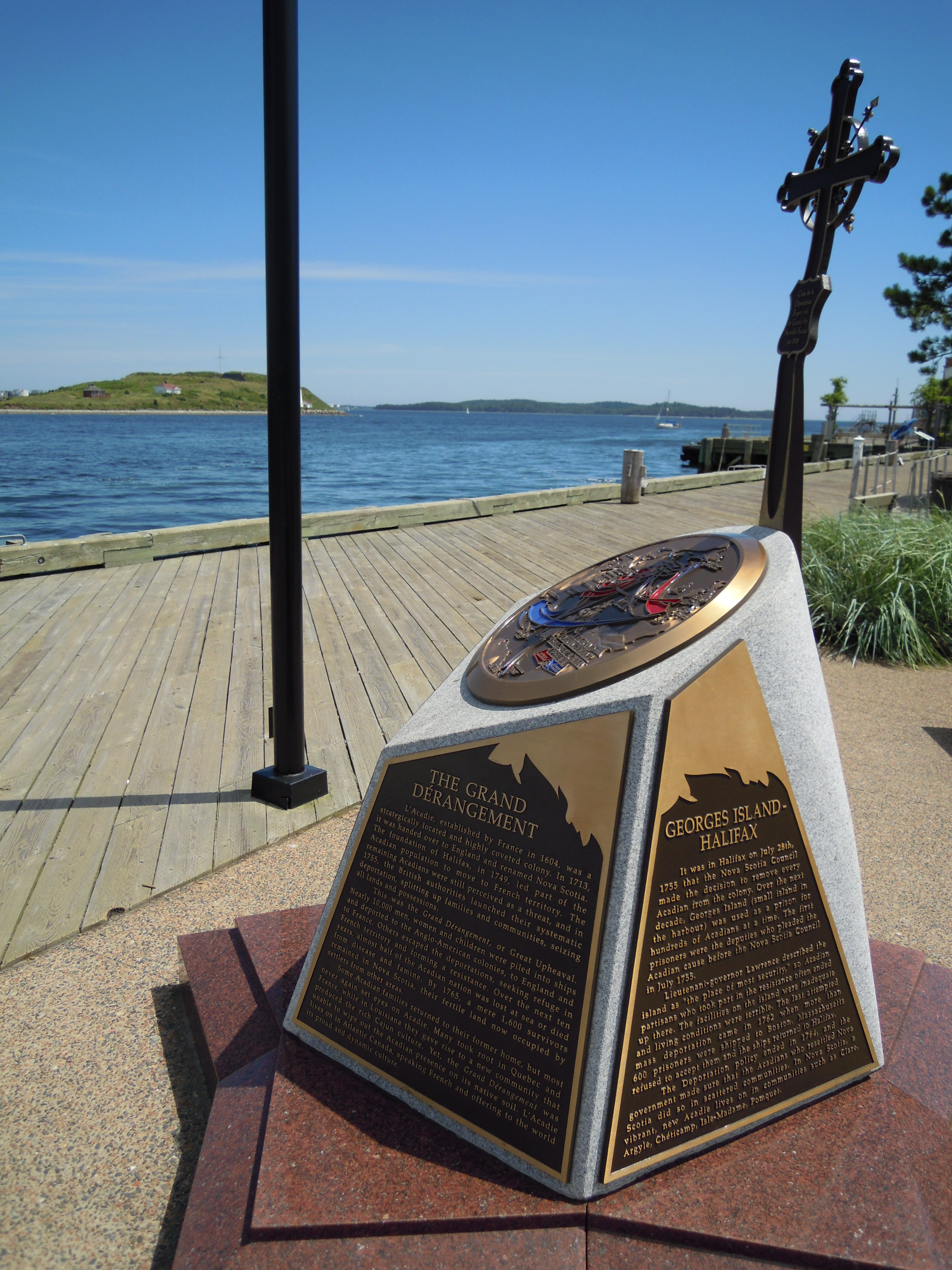
Monument to Imprisoned Acadians at Bishops Landing, Halifax, overlooking Georges Island

- Joseph Broussard, an Acadian folk hero and militia leader who joined French priest Jean-Louis Le Loutre in resisting the British occupation of Acadia.
- Noël Doiron (1684–1758). A regional leader, Noel was among the more than 350 Acadians who died during the deportation when the Duke William sank on 13 December 1758. He was widely celebrated and places have been named for him in Nova Scotia.
- Jean Baptiste Guedry (d. 1726). An example of an Acadian who resisted British rule. He took over a small ship off Acadia and was tried for piracy. The trial was publicized to the Mi'kmaq tribes as an example of English law. Guedry's trial was used as a counter to local customs, which allowed the holding of a group—i.e., all Englishmen—responsible for an individual's crimes. His prosecutors also used his trial as a test case for separating English law as applied to Acadia from law applied to First Nations groups like the Wabanaki Confederacy.

=== Contemporary Canadian figures ===
- Angèle Arsenault, singer
- Aubin-Edmond Arsenault, the first Acadian premier of any province and the first Acadian appointed to a provincial supreme court
- Joseph-Octave Arsenault, the first Acadian appointed to the Canadian Senate from Prince Edward Island
- Victor Boudreau, former New Brunswick politician and Canadian Senator
- Jean Paul Bourque (known by the stage name Johnny Burke), singer/songwriter
- Édith Butler, singer
- Phil Comeau, film director
- René Cormier, artist/activist and Canadian Senator
- Rhéal Cormier, baseball player
- Chris d'Entremont, member of parliament for West Nova
- Julie Doiron, singer/songwriter
- Lyse Doucet, BBC journalist and presenter
- Yvon Durelle, boxer
- Emile Duprée, professional wrestler and promoter
- René Duprée, professional wrestler
- Dominic LeBlanc, Canadian politician
- Jacques LeBlanc, boxer
- Roméo LeBlanc, former Governor General of Canada
- Antonine Maillet, writer, first non-European recipient of the Prix Goncourt
- Robert Maillet, actor and former professional wrestler
- Rodney Ouellette, physician-scientist and Canadian Senator
- Gérard Poitras, former Command Chief Warrant Officer of the Royal Canadian Air Force
- Louis Robichaud, former New Brunswick premier, modernized education and the government of New Brunswick in the mid-20th century
- Donald Savoie, public administration and regional economic development scholar
- Natasha St-Pier, singer
- Jackie Vautour, activist
- Peter John Veniot, first Acadian to serve as the premier of New Brunswick
- Sami Landri, drag queen

=== Figures in the U.S. ===
- William Arceneaux, Louisiana historian and president of the Council for the Development of French in Louisiana
- Beyoncé, singer and descendant of Joseph Broussard
- Kathleen Blanco, first female governor of Louisiana
- Melinda French Gates, philanthropist
- Dudley J. LeBlanc, senator from Louisiana
- Phoebe Legere, artist
- Dustin Poirier, former UFC fighter of Acadian descent from Louisiana, 1x Interim UFC Lightweight Champion holder
- Zachary Richard, singer/songwriter from Louisiana
- George Rodrigue, artist
- RuPaul, drag queen, television host, singer, producer, writer, and actor
- Austin Theriault, stock car driver

== See also ==
- Acadian cuisine
- Acadian culture
- Acadian folklore
- Acadian Renaissance
- Aquitani
- Chiac
- French-Canadian Americans
- History of Nova Scotia
- Iberians
- Paul Carmel Laporte
- Louisiana Creoles
- Military history of Nova Scotia
- Occitania
- Occitans
- Acadians in Quebec
- Acadian diaspora
- Religion in Acadia
- Mass media in Acadia
