= National Acadian Day =

Canadian national day

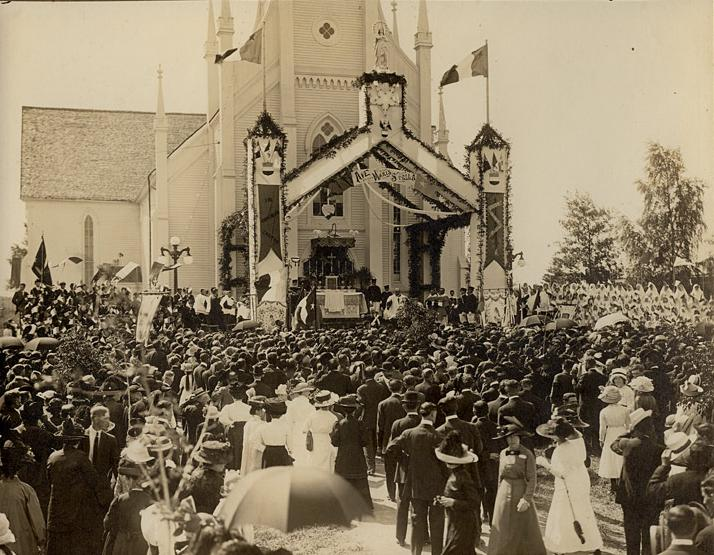
National Acadian Day in 1909, Shediac, New Brunswick

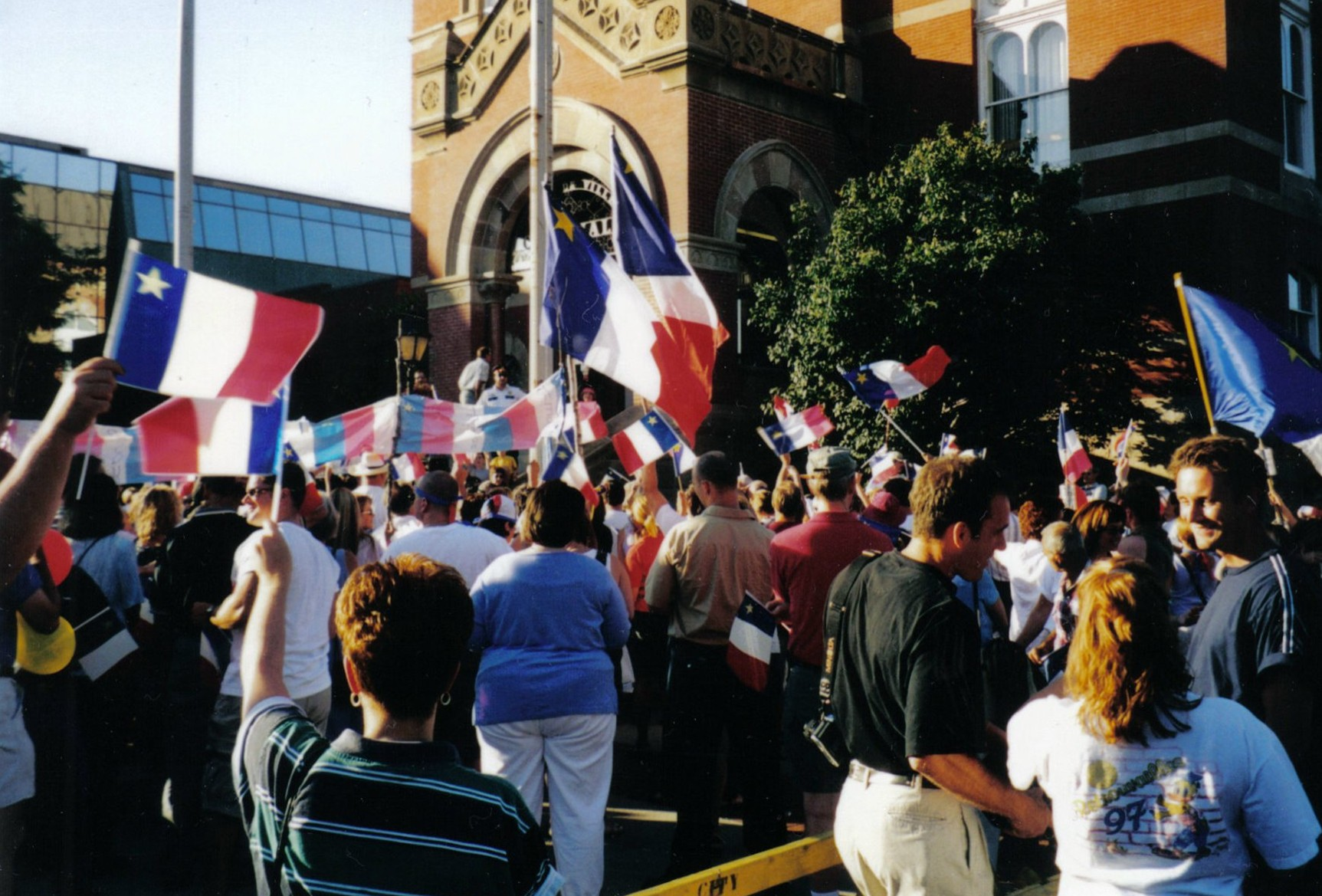
Celebration of National Acadian Day in Fredericton, New Brunswick, with a traditional tintamarre and Acadian flags

The National Acadian Day (French: Fête nationale de l'Acadie) is observed in parts of Canada each year on August 15, to celebrate Acadian culture. It was during the first National Convention of the Acadians held at Memramcook, New Brunswick, in 1881 that the Acadian leaders received the mandate to set the date of this celebration, which is also the feast of the Assumption of Mary.

The choice of the date was the object of a debate at the convention between those wishing for Acadians to celebrate June 24, Saint-Jean-Baptiste Day, and National Day of French Canadians since 1834 and National Holiday of Quebec since 1977, and others wishing the celebration to occur on August 15.

The arguments put forth by those who favoured June 24 were:

- Acadians must unite with the other francophone Canadians in common objectives before the anglophone majority of Canada.
- August 15 occurs during harvest, so it would be difficult for all to be free for the celebration.

The arguments put forth by those who favoured August 15 were:

- The Acadians constitute a distinct nationality/ethnicity and must adopt their own national day.
- The adoption of a national day distinct from that of French Canadians will not prevent unity between the two peoples.
- June 24 occurs during seeds, so it would be equally difficult for all to be free for the celebration.
- August 15 is Assumption Day, Catholic celebration of Virgin Mary, patron saint of the Acadians.

During this period of time, a good number of people among the Acadian leaders were traditionalists wishing for the conservation of the values and customs of pre-revolutionary France. This did not however prevent the Acadians from adopting a tricolor flag three years later at the Miscouche convention.

Abbot Marcel-François Richard, who favoured August 15, is believed to have had an influence on the decision with the speech he gave at the convention. He said:

In fact, it seems to me that a people who, for over a century of hardships and persecutions, was able to preserve its religion, language, customs and autonomy, must have acquired enough importance to affirm its existence in a solemn way; and this could not be accomplished better than by being able to celebrate its own national holiday... Allow me, at this time, to point out a few of the motives that will encourage you to choose Our Lady of Assumption as National Acadian Day instead of the Saint-Jean-Baptiste. Since Canadians have chosen Saint-Jean-Baptiste as their patron, it seems to me that unless you wish to mistake our nationality with theirs, it is crucial that Acadians choose a particular holiday. It is important to stress that we are not descendants of Canada, but of France. Consequently, I see no reason why we should adopt the Saint-Jean-Baptiste as our national holiday... We must choose a holiday that reminds us of our origin. I am even going to go as far as to affirm that the Assumption has always been, and must always remain, National Acadian Day, since Acadians are descendants of the French race. Louis XIII vowed to give his empire to the Blessed Virgin and he wanted the Assumption to be the kingdom's national holiday. However, not long afterwards, he sent colonists to take over Acadia. They did, however, have to bring the customs of their homeland along, and if unfortunate circumstances prevented them from celebrating their national holiday in a regular manner, it is true that the national devotion of the Acadians is their devotion to Mary.

In the end, the members present at the convention decided on August 15.

The Vatican ratified the choice of the Acadian convention many years later in a proclamation issued on January 19, 1938.

The Parliament of Canada made National Acadian Day an official Canadian holiday on June 19, 2003. Acadian Day is an officially recognised in Nova Scotia under the Provincial Acadian Day Act.

National Acadian Day is often dubbed by Acadians in Chiac as "Quinze zou des fous" (Quinze-Août des Fous) or simply "Quinze zou".

== See also ==
- Tintamarre
- Flag of Acadia
