= Tintamarre =

Tradition

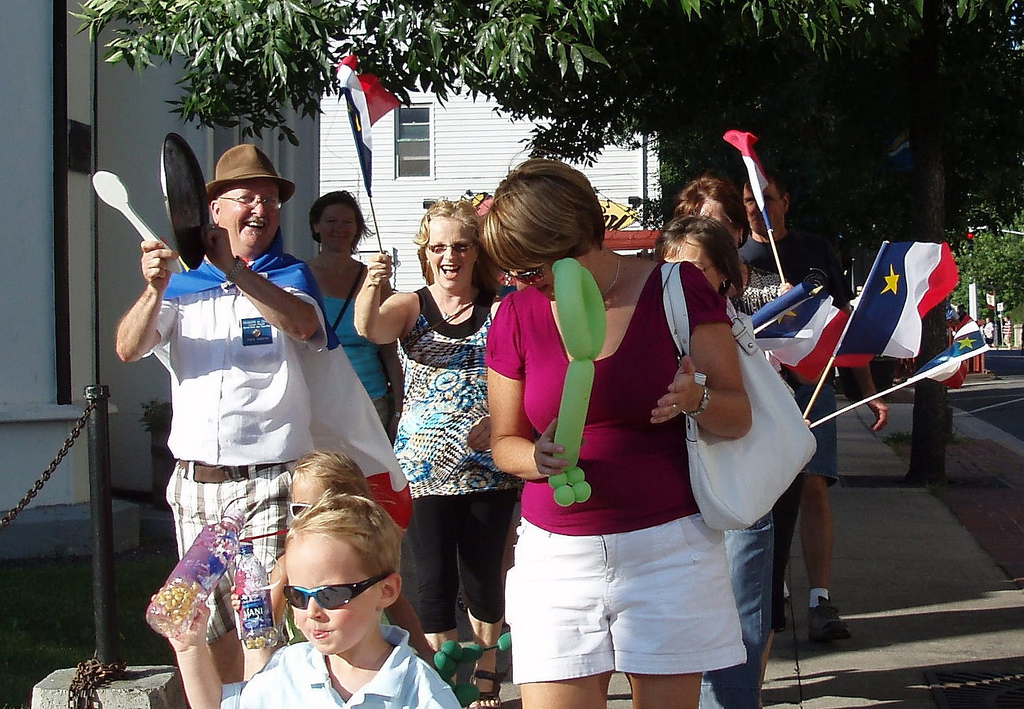
- Tintamarre noisemakers in Fredericton, New Brunswick, in 2010
- Status: Active
- Genre: Traditional
- Frequency: Annually and/or at gatherings of Acadians
- Location: Acadia
- Country: Primarily Canada
- Years active: 1955–present
- Founded: 10 August 1955
- Founder: Norbert Robichaud

Tintamarre is an Acadian tradition of marching through one's community making noise with improvised instruments and other noisemakers, usually in celebration of National Acadian Day. The term originates from the Acadian French word meaning "clangour" or "din". The practice is intended to demonstrate the vitality and solidarity of Acadian society, and to remind others of the presence of Acadians. It originated in the mid-twentieth century, likely inspired by an ancient French folk custom.

== History ==
Tintamarre is a recent tradition established by people of Acadian descent in Canada in the mid-20th century, although it is believed to have been inspired by the ancient French folk custom of Charivari. In 1955, during the commemorations of the 200th anniversary of the Expulsion of the Acadians, the Archbishop of Moncton, Norbert Robichaud, circulated an instruction sheet for the marking of the event. He advised families to kneel in outdoor prayer once the church bells began to ring, and he wrote:

Une fois la prière terminée, on fera pendant plusieurs minutes, un joyeux tintamarre de tout ce qui peut crier, sonner et faire du bruit: sifflets de moulin, klaxons d'automobiles, clochettes de bicyclettes, criards, jouets, etc. ("Once the prayer is finished, there will be a joyful tintamarre lasting for several minutes, featuring anything, everything and everyone that can make noise, shout and ring: mill whistles, car horns, bicycle bells, squawking objects, toys, etc.")

René Lévesque, then a Radio-Canada journalist, was in Moncton covering the commemoration of the Acadian deportation, and described the tintamarre in his report:

Écoutez encore, c'est la vie de l'Acadie française en 1955, deux siècles après la mort qu'on prévoyait. ("Listen! It is the sound of the heartbeat of French-speaking Acadia in 1955—two centuries after it was supposed to have been extinguished.")

In 1979, the Société Nationale des Acadiens sought to revive the Tintamarre for the celebrations in Caraquet, New Brunswick, of the 375th anniversary of the founding of Acadia. Organizers urged celebrants to reaffirm their Acadian identity loudly and clearly, so as to emphasize the slogan of the celebrations: On est venus c'est pour rester ("We've come back and we're here to stay"). In 1980, although there were no official efforts to organize any noisemaking, spontaneous Tintamarres were reported in Caraquet and in other Acadian communities in New Brunswick. By 1984, area newspapers noted discussions of holding "traditional Tintamarres" to celebrate the 100th anniversary of the Flag of Acadia, even though the "tradition" was only a few decades old.

The Tintamarre held during the 2009 Festival acadien in Caraquet involved 40,000 participants.

== Acadian symbol ==
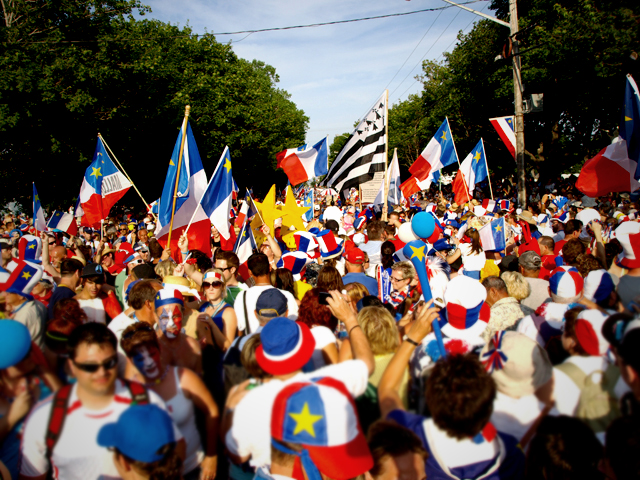
The Tintamarre in Caraquet, New Brunswick, in 2009

Along with the Acadian flag and the hymn Ave Maris Stella, the Tintamarre has become widely recognized as an Acadian symbol. It has become an important part of National Acadian Day celebrations in Canada and of any other events affirming Acadian identity and accomplishments. In 2006, a Tintamarre was held to help inaugurate a new medical training program at the Université de Moncton; when asked why noisemaking had been included in an academic event, organizers explained that the Tintamarre was "an essential Acadian custom".

A number of communities in Atlantic Canada, including Bouctouche, Moncton, Summerside, Caraquet, Clare and Chéticamp, hold annual Tintamarres, with the provincial governments of both New Brunswick and Nova Scotia promoting these events as tourist attractions. The tradition has extended beyond Acadia, with Tintamarres being held to celebrate the Franco-Ontarian community in Hawkesbury, Ontario, to launch the annual "Semaine de la Francophonie" in Toronto, and to mark Acadian Week in the town of Saint-Aubin-sur-Mer, Calvados, France. A Tintamarre was held on the Saint Leonard – Van Buren International Bridge on the Canada–United States border as part of the 2014 Acadian World Congress, which took place in the border counties of Aroostook in Maine, Témiscouata in Quebec, and Victoria, Madawaska and Restigouche in New Brunswick. The largest tintamarre parade is actually held in Bouctouche, New Brunswick, while in Caraquet, New Brunswick people gather in the streets to make noise, making more like a “foire” meaning a fair or festival.
