= Acadians in Quebec =

Ethnic community in Quebec, Canada

The Acadian community in Quebec is distributed across several regions and comprises individuals with diverse origins. A survey conducted by Léger revealed that over one million Quebecers have an Acadian surname. A study by the University of Quebec at Montreal (UQAM) indicates that approximately 4.8 million Quebec residents have one or more Acadian ancestors in their family tree. Montreal alone is home to approximately 200,000 individuals with Acadian heritage. The regions where Acadians reside are referred to as "Cadies", and numerous towns and villages use "Cadiens" as their demonym.

== Definitions ==
=== Acadian identity (Acadianité) ===
The term Acadianité delineates the defining characteristics of an Acadian. In the Maritime Provinces, the designation of Acadian is typically extended to encompass all Francophones, including several Anglophones who trace their lineage to assimilated Acadians. In Quebec, the term Acadian is understood to encompass any Francophone individual who exhibits an Acadian accent or demonstrates an affinity for Acadian culture, whether by birth or through association.

The number of Acadians is challenging to ascertain due to the inconsistencies in the conceptualization of Acadian identity across regions, individual self-identification, and the reliability of available sources. A significant proportion of Quebecers who align with the local definition of Acadian are unaware of their origins. In many instances, individuals uncover this information while engaged in genealogical research. According to the 2006 Canadian census, 96,145 individuals were self-identifying as Acadians in the country. Nevertheless, a considerable number of individuals who meet the criteria for classification as Acadians identify themselves ethnically as "French" or "Canadian." This is partly because the option Acadian was not previously available on the relevant forms. Since its inclusion, the number of individuals self-identifying as Acadian has increased, despite a lack of corresponding growth in the actual population. A 1989 Léger Marketing survey estimated that nearly one in seven Quebecers, or approximately one million individuals, have Acadian origins. Several genealogists, including Bona Arsenault and Adrien Bergeron, have endorsed this figure, with Bergeron asserting that Quebec has over one million Acadians.

Unless otherwise indicated, the term "Acadian" in this article is used by the generally accepted definition of Acadianité in Quebec.

=== Cadie ===
In Quebec, the term Cadie or Petite Cadie refers to a town or region where Acadians have settled. The term is thought to have derived from Acadia and to have ancient roots, later becoming popularized by historians such as Raymond Casgrain, Antoine Bernard, Robert Rumilly, Napoléon Bourassa, and Eugène Achard. Additionally, the word Cadie is employed as an alternative name for Acadiana, a region in Louisiana.

Approximately thirty municipalities and regions in Quebec can be considered "Cadies", although in some of these locations, Acadians were merely passing through, and Acadian culture is often no longer present today. In Abitibi-Témiscamingue, the villages of Béarn, Clerval, and Roquemaure are historically associated with the Acadians. In the Centre-du-Québec region, Saint-Grégoire in Bécancour, as well as Nicolet and its surrounding area, Saint-Pierre-les-Becquets, and Odanak, are all considered to be Cadies. In Chaudière-Appalaches, the municipalities of Saint-Gervais, the Beauce region (in particular, Saint-Théophile and Saint-Zacharie), and the Bois-Francs area are of particular interest. Additionally, the entire shoreline from Lévis in Chaudière-Appalaches to Notre-Dame-du-Portage in Bas-Saint-Laurent is also associated with the Acadians. The Côte-Nord region is also considered to be a Cadie. Some regions of the Estrie province are regarded as Cadies. In the Gaspésie–Îles-de-la-Madeleine region, Acadians are present in several locations, including along the southern shore of the Gaspé Peninsula, in the Matapédia Valley (especially in the southern part of this region), and on the Magdalen Islands. In the Lanaudière region, Acadians are present in the municipalities of L'Assomption, Saint-Jacques, and in the area surrounding Nouvelle-Acadie. In the Mauricie region, numerous localities are linked to the Acadians, including Batiscan, Champlain, Louiseville, Sainte-Anne-de-la-Pérade, Trois-Rivières, and Yamachiche. Additionally, Montreal is regarded as a Cadie, particularly in the borough of Verdun. In Montérégie, Acadians are associated with various localities situated along the Richelieu River. The Outaouais region is also worthy of mention, as is the city of Quebec, particularly the Limoilou neighborhood; Saguenay–Lac-Saint-Jean, the city of Saguenay—particularly the neighborhoods of Arvida and Kénogami in the borough of Jonquière.

=== Acadia ===
Acadia describes a vast territory with undefined boundaries and no formal recognition in law. Nevertheless, few individuals from these regions explicitly reject its existence. In the view of scholars such as Léon Thériault, Michel Roy, and Adrien Bérubé, discussing Acadia after 1763 is a paradoxical and "act of faith" due to the territory's conquest by the United Kingdom and the subsequent dispersal of its population. Over time, the conceptualization of Acadia has evolved, with varying definitions all tied to a sense of territory. Some, such as Édith Butler, assert that Acadia has no borders.

In 1979, Adrien Bérubé, a geographer, proposed four definitions of Acadia that have since become widely accepted. The initial iteration of Acadia, designated as Historical Acadia, existed between 1604 and 1763. Its territory encompassed the shores of the Bay of Fundy, or, in a more expansive interpretation, the entire coastline extending from the Saint Croix River in the west to Chaleur Bay in the north. This included the islands in the southern Gulf of Saint Lawrence, which correspond today to the Maritime Provinces, eastern Maine, and the Gaspé Peninsula. The second definition, Genealogical Acadia (also known as the Acadia of the Diaspora), encompasses the regions that welcomed Acadian families during the deportation. These include the Atlantic Provinces, Quebec, Saint Pierre and Miquelon, New England, Louisiana, the Caribbean, French Guiana, the Falkland Islands, and France. The third definition, Functional or Operational Acadia, is also referred to as the Acadia of the Maritimes or Atlantic Acadia. It encompasses only the Francophone areas of Canada's Maritime Provinces. Finally, Prospective Acadia includes all the Francophone counties and parishes of New Brunswick. Quebec is included in the first two definitions of Acadia. However, associating certain regions of Quebec with Acadia is still considered bold by many.

Acadia of the Lands and Forests is used to describe a region that encompasses the Hauts-Plateaux of New Brunswick, the Madawaska region, which extends across the border into Maine, and the Témiscouata region of Quebec.

== History ==
=== French regime ===
==== The first Acadians ====
A number of seigneurs and other Acadians undertook journeys to Quebec City for reasons pertaining to the administration of their affairs, despite the fact that Acadia was governed by its authorities. The city, situated at a major port, also attracted military personnel and businessmen.

==== Seven Years' War ====
In 1755, Quebec City became a destination for nearly 2,000 individuals displaced by the Acadian deportation. The refugees arrived in Quebec City via boats traversing the Gulf of Saint Lawrence or traversing the forest. A considerable number of fugitives perished as a result of battle or succumbed to the effects of fatigue, cold, hunger, or disease. A considerable number of these individuals also perished upon their arrival in Quebec. In 1758, Jean-Baptiste-Nicolas Roch de Ramezay, who had previously distinguished himself in Acadia, was appointed as the King's lieutenant and played a role in facilitating the Acadians' arrival in the city. However, Quebec was already overcrowded, which led to several issues. In 1759, the city was subjected to a British bombardment, compelling the population to evacuate. Some Acadians sought refuge on Île d'Orléans, a nearby island, but were compelled to evacuate the same year when the island was occupied. A small number of individuals could establish a settlement in Saint-Gervais, situated on the opposite bank of the Saint Lawrence River. In the Battle of the Plains of Abraham on September 13, 1759, 200 militia members of Canadian and Acadian descent were positioned to cover the retreat of French forces, facing British troops. Following the fall of Quebec, Lieutenant Colonel Monckton permitted 200 Acadians to return to Acadia. However, following a challenging journey, they were imprisoned in Halifax and subsequently deported to England. A census conducted between 1769 and 1770 indicated that Acadians constituted less than 6% of Quebec City's population, a proportion that remained approximately constant until the 1810s. The city, in a state of disrepair, was not an attractive place to live, and the British regarded the Acadians as rebels. Consequently, some Acadians relocated to the outskirts of the city or villages situated along the Saint Lawrence River between Quebec and Montreal.

In 1758, Acadians seeking refuge from deportation established a settlement known as Petite-Rochelle, situated near the Restigouche River in the western region of Gaspésie. In the region, Acadian and French privateers launched attacks on British ships. The Battle of the Restigouche took place between July 3 and 8, 1760, resulting in a British victory over the French. James Wolfe proceeded to destroy Petite-Rochelle, thereby offering the French the option of returning to France without further conflict, which the majority of them accepted. Those remaining sought refuge along the shores of Chaleur Bay. Those on the southern shore were deported during Roderick MacKenzie's raid in October 1761. Those who escaped took refuge in Miscou or Gaspésie. By 1774, Charles Robin had brought 81 Acadians to Chaleur Bay.

During the deportation, Montreal received several Acadians, particularly single individuals. However, the majority of these individuals arrived at a later date. The city was perceived as a more appealing destination than Quebec due to its fertile soil, relative peace at the time, and the presence of Sulpician seigneurs who had ties to Acadia. Situated between L'Assomption and Haut-Richelieu, two regions that had previously welcomed Acadians, Montreal also offered a range of employment opportunities, including the reconstruction efforts following the fires of 1765 and 1768. Mathurin Bourg was the first Acadian to settle in Montreal in 1772. A census conducted in 1781 recorded approximately 60 Acadian surnames, indicating that approximately 10% of the city's 18,000 residents were of Acadian descent. The influx of Acadians continued throughout the nineteenth century, as some sought employment in the factories or established businesses, such as that of Nazaire Dupuis in 1868. Many were from Haut-Richelieu, where Acadian origins were still a prominent aspect of the local identity. This heritage-inspired figures such as the French-Canadian architect Napoléon Bourassa and his disciple, the Acadian sculptor Louis-Philippe Hébert. Bourassa authored Jacques et Marie, a historical novel about the deportees, regarded as one of Canada's finest works of fiction.

=== British regime ===
==== Royal proclamation ====
In the wake of the 1763 Treaty of Paris, many Acadians relocated from New England to establish themselves near Fort Saint-Jean in Montérégie. The parish of L'Acadie, now part of Saint-Jean-sur-Richelieu, was established in 1768 along the Montréal River, which was subsequently renamed L'Acadie. The fertile soil allowed the Acadians to flourish, with a church constructed in 1801 and the population reaching 3,000 in a relatively short period. The settlement subsequently expanded to include the communities of Saint-Luc, Napierville, Saint-Jacques-le-Mineur, and Saint-Blaise. Other Acadians deported from their homes in Nova Scotia settled in the lower Richelieu Valley, in villages such as Saint-Denis-sur-Richelieu, Saint-Ours, Saint-Charles-sur-Richelieu, Saint-Marc-sur-Richelieu, Saint-Antoine, and Saint-Roch-de-Richelieu. By 1770, Saint-Denis was already home to 13 Acadian families. Simon Thibodeau and Louis Robichaud were instrumental in establishing a prominent ceramics industry in the region, which flourished for over a century. Additionally, numerous Acadians played a role in the Patriotes Rebellion of 1837–1838. Over time, proximity to major cities and migration contributed to assimilating Acadian culture in Montérégie. Celebrations in 1955 and 1982, along with family reunions, helped raise awareness among Acadian descendants.

Following 1765, refugees returned from New England and resettled in several small Acadian communities along the Saint Lawrence River. Some, however, elected to remain in Quebec despite the city's state of disrepair. Priests Le Guerne, Dosque, Germain, and Labrosse, all of whom had managed to evade imprisonment or deportation, facilitated the resettlement of refugees in the Quebec region. Acadia, subsequently renamed Nova Scotia, remained under the jurisdiction of the Diocese of Quebec until 1817. Bishop Briand, who served from 1766, dispatched priests to Acadia at the earliest opportunity once the British permitted their presence. This enabled the restoration of communications, with bishops themselves conducting visits, notably Bishop Plessis in 1811, 1812, and 1815. These visits facilitated the reunification of separated families and fostered closer ties between Acadians and Québécois.

Several Acadian refugees in Quebec took up residence in the seigneury of Saint-Sulpice, situated in the Lanaudière region. The Sulpicians facilitated the establishment of a favorable settlement along the L'Assomption and Achigan Rivers, which led to the formation of the community of Saint-Jacques-de-la-Nouvelle-Acadie in 1772.

The majority of Acadians who returned to settle on Prince Edward Island ultimately chose to leave to evade British servitude. Among them were those who established the village of Saint-Alexis-de-Matapédia in 1780.

==== Constitution act ====
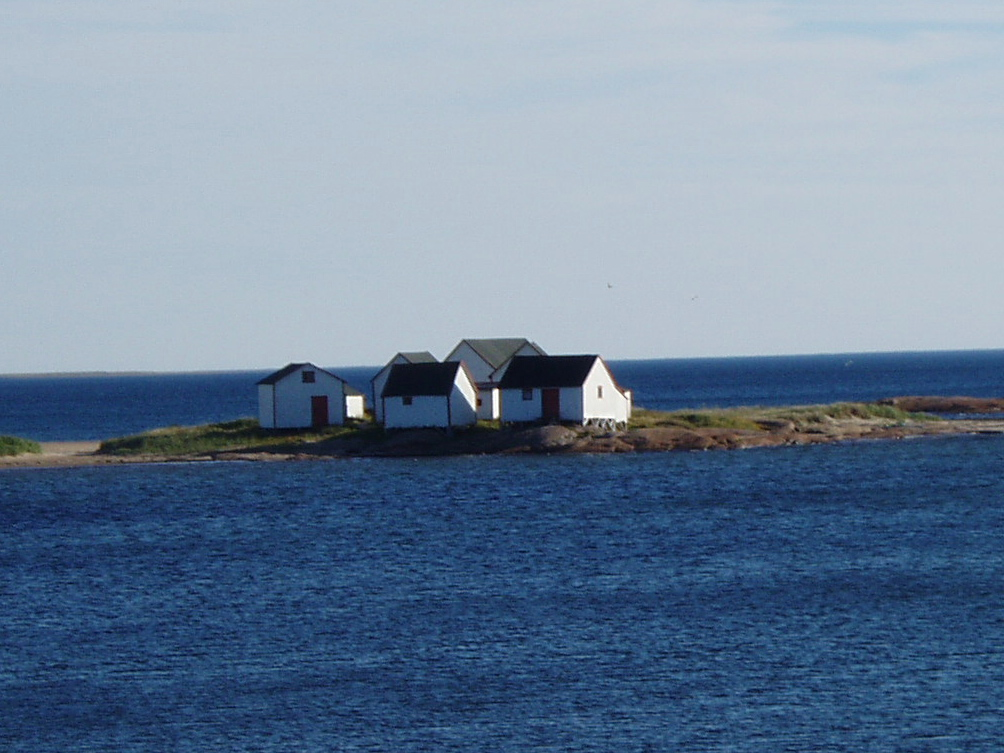
Fishermen's huts in Natashquan.

The individuals mentioned above impacted the city of Quebec, particularly in the wake of the Constitutional Act's implementation in 1791. Abbé André Doucet and his vicar, Pierre-Marie Mignault, had already made a notable impact. Deputies Louis Bourdages and Jean-Baptiste Hébert, active in the first half of the nineteenth century, were staunch defenders of democracy and supporters of the Patriotes' Rebellion. Consequently, Hébert was imprisoned in 1838. In the late 19th century, several Acadians from the Maritimes relocated to Quebec City in search of employment opportunities. In the aftermath of World War II, a further influx of Acadians into the city contributed to the strengthening of relations between Quebec and Acadia. During the 1970s, Acadians became more prominent in the economy and politics, as evidenced by the founding of the Parti acadien. In 1987, the Société Nationale de l'Acadie opened a Bureau de l'Acadie in Quebec, distributing the brochure Voici l'Acadie. The office later relocated to Montreal but closed in 1992, despite some financial support from the government.

The Acadians commenced their settlement of the Côte-Nord in 1830, motivated by a desire to evade the authority of the seigneurs of the Magdalen Islands. Approximately ten families settled in Kégaska, 20 to 25 in Natashquan, and over 70 families in Havre-Saint-Pierre and the seigneury of Mingan. The city of Sept-Îles, which has since become the region's capital, was founded in 1782 by Dominique Chiasson, an Acadian. Given the unfeasibility of agricultural activities, the population shifted its focus to fishing. Additionally, Acadians established a presence in Anse-aux-Fraises on Anticosti Island in 1773. By the time Henri Menier purchased the island, Acadians constituted 25% of its population. However, several families lacking land titles were expelled and sought refuge on the North Shore.

==== Acadian renaissance ====
Simultaneously, politicians such as Louis-Joseph Papineau and Éric Doiron lauded the courage of the Acadians in their orations.

Many publications were instrumental in the Acadian Renaissance. François-Xavier Garneau commenced publication of his Histoire du Canada in 1845, which included discussions of the Acadians. American poet Henry Wadsworth Longfellow contributed to the growing awareness of the Acadian diaspora with his 1847 poem Evangeline. Additionally, Edme Rameau de Saint-Père made a notable contribution to the movement through his historical works, which commenced in 1859. In 1869, the periodical La Gazette des familles acadiennes et canadiennes was launched in Quebec and ran for approximately a decade. In 1887 and 1888, Abbé Henri-Raymond Casgrain published Pèlerinage au pays d'Évangéline, accompanied by a series of Acadian documents unearthed in France. These works, anchored in historical veracity and crafted with a compelling narrative style, had a profound and enduring impact. Casgrain subsequently published Une Seconde Acadie in 1894.

In 1880, the Société Saint-Jean-Baptiste convened a congress in Quebec, extending an invitation to Acadians from the Maritimes. At this event, Pascal Poirier delivered a presentation on the status of Acadians in the wake of the Canadian Confederation. It was at this juncture that the decision was taken to convene the inaugural Acadian National Convention in Memramcook the following year.

=== Canadian confederation ===
In the 1880s, a significant number of Quebecers migrated to the United States, seeking greater spatial and employment opportunities. However, repatriation programs were met with limited success, prompting the government to explore alternative avenues for settlement. This led to the opening of the Témiscamingue region, which proved attractive to numerous Acadians from the Joliette area, particularly those who settled in the village of Béarn, where they constituted the majority population.

In 1893, approximately 50 families from the Natashquan region relocated to Saint-Théophile in the Beauce region of Quebec.

The Société Saint-Jean-Baptiste of Quebec persisted in its engagement with the Acadians, as evidenced by its practice of exchanging speakers, its collection of donations, and its distribution of 16,000 school textbooks to the Maritimes in 1946. The Eudists, who also operated colleges in New Brunswick and Nova Scotia, extended an invitation to Acadian students to attend their college in Quebec. These students were awarded scholarships after 1900 and established the Cercle d'Aulnay in 1924. From 1944 onwards, with the formation of the Association of Acadian Students of Quebec, the Vie Française journal also commenced publishing articles about them. The association organized talks and exchanges of delegates with Acadians from the Maritimes.

From 1912 to 1920, numerous Acadians from Gaspésie, the Maritimes, and the Magdalen Islands relocated to Verdun, which is now a neighborhood of Montreal. This resettlement was facilitated by Father Joseph Arsène Richard, who organized conferences, exchanges with diaspora Acadians, and other initiatives.

In 1916, Édouard Richard published Acadie, a three-volume work on the history of the Acadians. In 1949, Antoine Bernard published La Renaissance acadienne au XXe siècle, which followed a series of articles in Vie Française. The most widely read works remain the studies of Bona Arsenault, an Acadian from Gaspésie, who, beginning in 1955, consulted provincial and national archives, as well as genealogical manuscripts. An English-language journal, titled French Canadian and Acadian Genealogical Review, was published for several years by Roland Auger. Since 1921, Acadian history has been taught at the University of Montreal. The journal Vie Française disseminated information about Acadians and the Société Saint-Jean-Baptiste.

The Société l'Assomption was established in 1903 in Massachusetts. The Montreal branch was founded in 1911 by student Edmond Aucoin, followed by a branch in Verdun. These branches played a significant role in Acadian economics and nationalism, organizing patriotic days, providing scholarships, and facilitating trips to Maritime Acadia. The Quebec branch opened in 1929.

At the beginning of the 20th century, the primary Acadian neighborhood in Quebec was Limoilou. The Anglo-Pulp factory commenced operations in 1928, attracting a considerable number of workers from the Maritimes, some of whom were merely passing through on their way to Saguenay–Lac-Saint-Jean, where the pulp and paper and aluminium industries were undergoing rapid expansion. Capuchin priests, who had previously worked in Acadia, extended a warm welcome to these workers in Limoilou and organized a series of religious gatherings, parades, and other events to commemorate National Acadian Day.

In 1955, during the bicentennial of the Acadian Deportation, the city of Montreal renamed McEachren Avenue to Boulevard de l'Acadie, and several other nearby toponyms, such as Port-Royal Street and Acadia Metro Station, followed the same theme.

== Nowadays ==
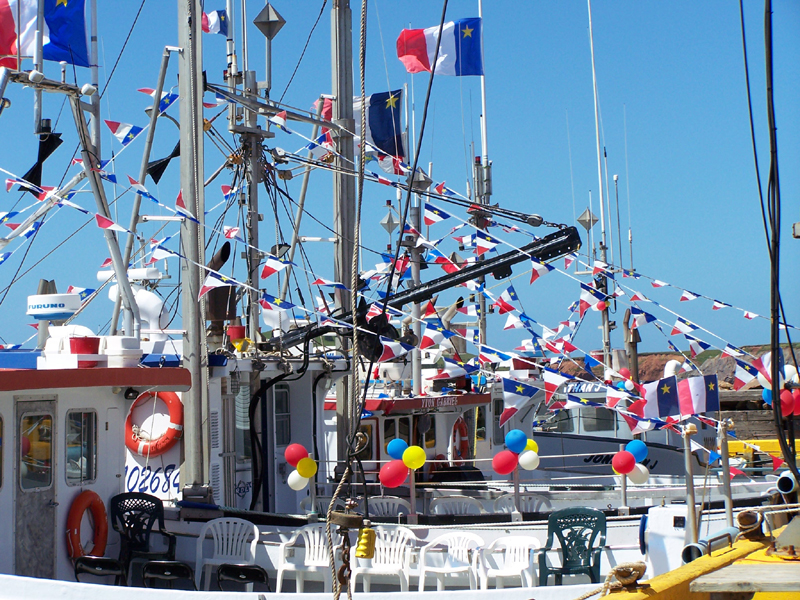
Boats decorated with the Acadian flag in the Magdalen Islands.

The Canadian province of Quebec is home to numerous associations representing the Acadian people, and many communities in the region celebrate National Acadian Day on August 15.

The Acadia of Lands and Forests region, comprising Témiscouata, northern Maine, and northwestern New Brunswick, was selected to host the 5th Acadian World Congress in 2014. Other regions that were considered included Louisiana, the Quebec shore of Chaleur Bay, and Quebec.

Media and Publications

- Phil Comeau's films: Les Acadiens du Québec with Fred Pellerin – a two-hour documentary series (Radio-Canada, 2011).

André-Carl Vachon's books

- Les Déportations des Acadiens et leur arrivée au Québec – 1755–1775 (2014).
- Raconte-moi la Déportation (a book for students, 2019).

== Quebec Acadian personalities ==
The following list comprises individuals of Acadian descent, either born in or currently residing in the Canadian province of Quebec.

- Bona Arsenault, politician and historian
- Jean Béliveau, ice hockey player
- Juliette Béliveau, actress
- Annie Blanchardf, singer
- Albéric Bourgeois, painter
- Pierre Bourque, former mayor of Montreal
- Jean-François Breau, singer
- Geneviève Bujold, comedian
- Édith Butler, singer
- Phil Comeau, filmmaker
- Ernest Cormier, Université de Montréal architect
- Louis-Jean Cormier, singer
- Isabelle Cyr, comedian
- Raoûl Duguay, singer, painter and poet
- Nazaire Dupuis, merchant and entrepreneur
- Patsy Gallant, singer, songwriter and actress
- Anne Hébert, writer
- Louis-Philippe Hébert, sculptor
- Raoul Jomphe, director
- Roland Jomphe, poet
- Claude Lafrance, singer
- Bernard Landry, former prime minister
- Georges Langford, singer
- Jean Lapierre, politician
- Denise Leblanc, politician
- Nicole Leblanc, comedian
- Wilfred LeBouthillier, singer
- Marcel Léger, politician and founder of the Fédération acadienne du Québec
- Antonine Maillet, writer
- Fred Pellerin, storyteller
- Maurice Richard, ice hockey player
- Zachary Richard, singer
- Michel Robichaud, couturier
- Marie-Jo Thério, singer
- Yves Thériault, writer
- Gilles Vigneault, singer
- Annie Savoie, singer

== See also ==
- Culture of Quebec
- Demographics of Quebec

== Bibliography ==
=== Documentaries ===
- Batigne, Stéphane (2009). Adrice et Clara [Adrice and Clara] (in French). Montreal: Éditions Mille et une vies. ISBN 978-2-923692-07-4.
- Bérubé, Adrien (1987). "De l'Acadie historique à la Nouvelle-Acadie : les grandes perceptions contemporaines de l'Acadie" [From historic Acadia to New Acadia: contemporary perceptions of Acadia]. Vie Française (in French). Quebec: Conseil de la vie française en Amérique. ISSN 0382-0262.
- Boudreau, Dennis M (2001). Dictionnaire généalogique des familles des Îles-de-la-Madeleine : Québec, 1760–1948 [Genealogical dictionary of Magdalen Islands families : Quebec, 1760-1948] (in French). Sainte-Foy: Société de généalogie de Québec. ISBN 978-2-89120-086-8.
- Chiasson, Anselme (1978). Les îles de la Madeleine: vie matérielle et sociale de l'en premier [The Magdalen Islands: material and social life in the early days] (in French). Leméac. ISBN 978-2-7609-5293-5.
- Chiasson, Anselme (1991). Le diable Frigolet ; et, 24 autres contes des îles de la Madeleine [Le diable Frigolet; and 24 other tales from the Magdalen Islands] (in French). Moncton: Éditions d'Acadie. ISBN 978-2-7600-0184-8.
- Hébert, Pierre-Maurice (1994). Les Acadiens du Québec [The Acadians of Quebec] (in French). Montreal: Éditions de L’Écho. ISBN 2-920312-32-4.
- Hébert, Pierre-Maurice (1984). Les Acadiens dans Bellechasse [Acadians in Bellechasse] (in French). La Pocatière: Société historique de la Côte-du-Sud.
- Nicole Martin-Veranka, Nicole (2003). Chassés d'Acadie : les Acadiens du Sud de Montréal [Driven out of Acadia: Montreal's southern Acadians] (in French). Montreal: Histoire-Québec. ISBN 978-2-89586-004-4.
- Mazerolle, Rodrigue (1998). Les acadiens réfugiés dans Bellechasse, 1756-58 [Acadian refugees in Bellechasse, 1756-58] (in French). Montreal: R. Mazerolle.
- Richard, Louis (1990). Les Familles acadiennes de la région de Trois-Rivières [Les Familles acadiennes de la région de Trois-Rivières] (in French). Trois-Rivières: Société de généalogie de la Mauricie et des Bois-Francs.
- Rumilly, Robert (1951). Les Îles de la Madeleine [Magdalen Islands] (in French). Montreal: Les Éditions Chantecler ltée.
- Acadiens et Antoniens, 1761-2006 [Acadians and Antonians, 1761-2006] (in French). Saint-Antoine-sur-Richelieu: Société historique et culturelle de Sainte-Antoine-sur-Richelieu. 2006. ISBN 978-2-922633-05-4.

=== Journals ===
- Bulletin de liaison de la Fédération acadienne du Québec

=== Novels ===
- Bourassa, Napoléon (1976). Jacques et Marie: souvenir d'un peuple dispersé [James and Mary: remembering a scattered people] (in French). Montreal: Fidès. ISBN 978-0-7755-0589-4.
- Rivière, Sylvain (2005). La belle embarquée [Beauty on board] (in French). Moncton, Lévis: Éditions de la Francophonie. ISBN 978-2-923016-90-0.
