= Marcel-François Richard =

Canadian priest and educator (1847–1915)

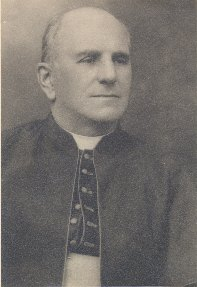
Marcel-François Richard

Marcel-François Richard (9 April 1847, Saint-Louis-de-Kent, New Brunswick - 18 June 1915, Rogersville, New Brunswick) was a Roman Catholic priest and a Canadian educator. He played an important part in the development of the Acadian people.

== Life ==
Born in Saint-Louis-de-Kent, New Brunswick, he studied in public schools and then at St. Dunstan's College in Charlottetown. He completed his classical studies before studying theology at the Grand Séminaire de Montréal.

In 1870 at age 23, he was ordained as a priest by Bishop Peter McIntyre of Charlottetown. He was named vicar in the parish of his birth Saint-Louis-de-Kent, and then parish priest for the next fifteen years.

In Saint-Louis-de-Kent, his principal concern was education. In 1874, he invited the Congregation of Notre Dame of Montreal to set up a community in the area. They built a convent dedicated to teaching women including nuns and Catholic teachers. Also, he had a bilingual school built for young Acadians in 1874, which offered a commercial program and a college preparatory school. This school became the Collège Saint-Louis (fr) a few years later.

In 1885, Bishop James Rogers sent Marcel-François Richard on a mission to Rogersville. He founded the parish of Acadieville. He even went into debt to save Rogersville and Acadieville from ruin after the poor harvests of 1884 and 1885.

== Acadian militancy ==
In 1881, Father Richard became involved in the Acadian national movement and participated in the 1881 National Acadian Convention in Memramcook. He worked with Stanislas-Joseph Doucet (fr) and François-Xavier Cormier (fr) to establish the Feast of the Assumption on August 15 as National Acadian Day. Some Acadians such as Philéas-Frédéric Bourgeois(fr) and Pierre-Amand Landry preferred June 24 which is Saint-Jean-Baptiste Day and Quebec's national holiday, but the Memramcook convention chose August 15 as favoured by Richard.

Acadian national flag

At the second National Acadian Convention in 1884 in Miscouche, the selection of national symbols was continued. Marcel-François Richard proposed Ave Maris Stella as the Acadian national anthem. He also designed and proposed the Acadian national flag, a French tricolour with a papal star added to represent devotion to the Virgin Mary. Both proposals were adopted.

Father Richard also campaigned for the appointment of more Acadian priests as bishops in the dioceses of the Maritime Provinces. In 1912 he finally obtained the nomination of the first Acadian bishop, Édouard Alfred LeBlanc. However his militancy displeased some Irish-Canadian prelates, who reproached him for putting the interests of the Acadian people before those of the universal Church, without distinctions based on languages or origins.

Father Richard is considered to have contributed much to the formation of the Acadian national identity during the Acadian Renaissance.

== Death ==
He died on 18 June 1915 at Rogersville, New Brunswick, where he is buried near the monument at Notre-Dame de l'Assomption (fr) which he himself had ordered built. In 1936, the Roman Catholic Archdiocese of Moncton was formed in Acadian canonical territory as he had wished.

The French-language elementary and high school École Mgr-Marcel-François-Richard in Saint-Louis-de-Kent is named in his honour.
