= Royal Proclamation of 2003 =

Canadian Crown Proclamation

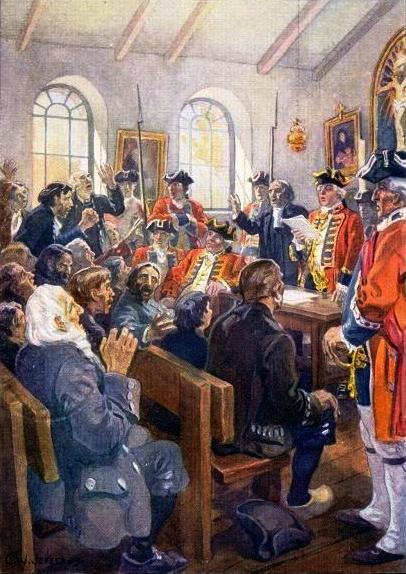
The deportation order is read to a group of Acadians in 1755

The Royal Proclamation of 2003, formally known as Proclamation Designating 28 July of Every Year as "A Day of Commemoration of the Great Upheaval", Commencing on 28 July 2005, is a document issued by the Canadian government in the name of Queen Elizabeth II acknowledging the Great Upheaval (or Great Expulsion or Grand Dérangement), Britain's expulsion of the Acadian settlers from Nova Scotia and New Brunswick, under a deportation order issued by King George II on 28 July 1755.

The Royal Proclamation of 2003 was made on 31 December 2003, with the 28 July 2005 designation for the first annual Day of Commemoration chosen to coincide with the 250th anniversary of the signing of the deportation order.

== Historical background ==
The proclamation's origin dates back to a 1763 petition submitted to King George III (grandson of George II) by Acadian exiles in Philadelphia, Pennsylvania. Because the King never responded to the petition, Warren A. Perrin, a Cajun (a.k.a. Louisiana Acadian) attorney and cultural activist from Erath, Louisiana, in the 1990s resurrected the petition and threatened to sue Elizabeth II (great-great-great-great-granddaughter of George III), as Queen in Right of the United Kingdom, if the Crown refused to acknowledge the Great Upheaval; no monetary compensation was requested, only acknowledgement.

After thirteen years of discussions, Perrin and his supporters in the United States and Canada persuaded the Canadian government to issue a royal proclamation acknowledging the historical existence of the Great Upheaval and subsequent misfortunes experienced by the Acadian people. The document itself was signed by Elizabeth II's viceregal representative in Canada, Governor General Adrienne Clarkson.

== Text of the proclamation ==
ADRIENNE CLARKSON
[ L.S. ]
Canada

Elizabeth the Second, by the Grace of God of the United Kingdom, Canada and her other Realms and Territories QUEEN, Head of the Commonwealth, Defender of the Faith.

To All To Whom these Presents shall come or whom the same may in any way concern,

Greeting:

Morris Rosenberg
Deputy Attorney General of Canada

A Proclamation

Whereas the Acadian people, through the vitality of their community, have made a remarkable contribution to Canadian society for almost 400 years;

Whereas on 28 July 1755, the Crown, in the course of administering the affairs of the British colony of Nova Scotia, made the decision to deport the Acadian people;

Whereas the deportation of the Acadian people, commonly known as the Great Upheaval, continued until 1763 and had tragic consequences, including the deaths of many thousands of Acadians – from disease, in shipwrecks, in their places of refuge and in prison camps in Nova Scotia and England as well as in the British colonies in America;

Whereas We acknowledge these historical facts and the trials and suffering experienced by the Acadian people during the Great Upheaval;

Whereas We hope that the Acadian people can turn the page on this dark chapter of their history;

Whereas Canada is no longer a British colony but a sovereign state, by and under the Constitution of Canada;

Whereas when Canada became a sovereign state, with regard to Canada, the Crown in right of Canada and of the provinces succeeded to the powers and prerogatives of the Crown in right of the United Kingdom;

Whereas We, in Our role as Queen of Canada, exercise the executive power by and under the Constitution of Canada;

Whereas this Our present Proclamation does not, under any circumstances, constitute a recognition of legal or financial responsibility by the Crown in right of Canada and of the provinces and is not, under any circumstances, a recognition of, and does not have any effect upon, any right or obligation of any person or group of persons;

And Whereas, by Order in Council P.C. 2003-1967 of 6 December 2003, the Governor in Council has directed that a proclamation do issue designating 28 July of every year as "A Day of Commemoration of the Great Upheaval", commencing on 28 July 2005;

Now Know You that We, by and with the advice of Our Privy Council for Canada, do by this Our Proclamation, effective on 5 September 2004, designate 28 July of every year as "A Day of Commemoration of the Great Upheaval", commencing on 28 July 2005.

Of All Which Our Loving Subjects and all others whom these Presents may concern are hereby required to take notice and to govern themselves accordingly.

In Testimony Whereof, We have caused this Our Proclamation to be published and the Great Seal of Canada to be hereunto affixed. Witness: Our Right Trusty and Well-beloved Adrienne Clarkson, Chancellor and Principal Companion of Our Order of Canada, Chancellor and Commander of Our Order of Military Merit, Chancellor and Commander of Our Order of Merit of the Police Forces, Governor General and Commander-in-Chief of Canada.

At Our Government House, in Our City of Ottawa, this tenth day of December in the year of Our Lord two thousand and three and in the fifty-second year of Our Reign.

By Command,
Jean-Claude Villiard
Deputy Registrar General of Canada
