= Rodney Ouellette =

Canadian politician and physician

The Honourable Rodney Ouellette ONB
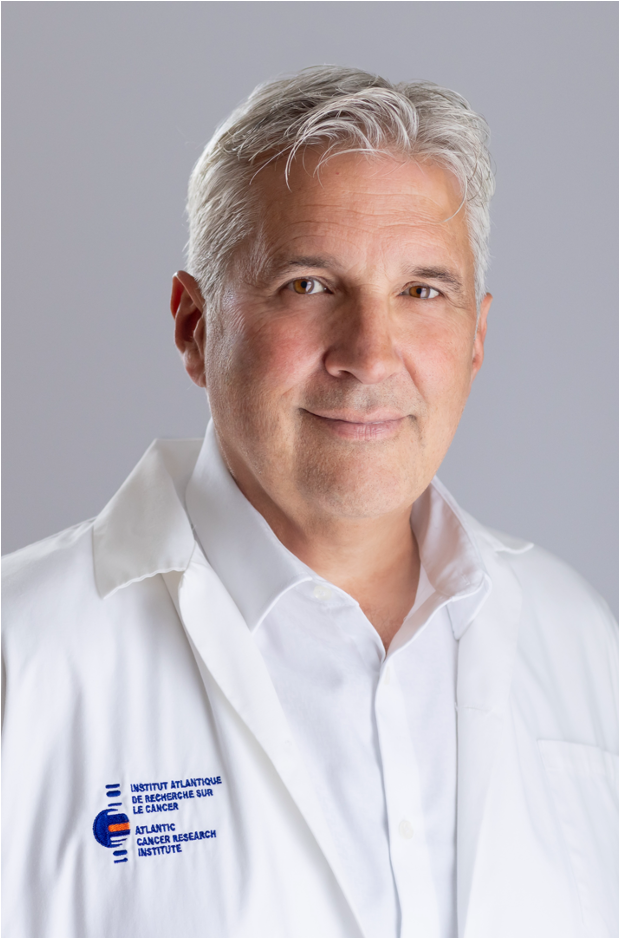

Canadian Senator from New Brunswick
- Incumbent
- Assumed office July 9, 2026
- Nominated by: Mark Carney
- Appointed by: Louise Arbour

Personal details
- Born: October 2, 1965 (age 61) Moncton, New Brunswick
- Spouse: Martine Tremblay
- Children: Maxime (1996), Caleb (1998), Eve (2000)

Rodney Ouellette (born October 2, 1965) is a Canadian physician-scientist and politician who has been a Canadian senator from New Brunswick since 2026.

== Early life ==
Ouellette was born in Moncton, New Brunswick, and was raised in Cap-Pelé. He attended Polyvalente Louis-J.-Robichaud high school.

== Education ==
Ouellette completed bachelor's and master's degrees in biochemistry at the Université de Moncton. He subsequently studied medicine and molecular and cellular biology at Université Laval, receiving both an MD and a PhD in 1996. He completed a residency in family medicine at the Université de Sherbrooke in 1998.

== Scientific career ==
After returning to New Brunswick in 1998, Ouellette founded the Atlantic Cancer Research Institute at the Dr. Georges-L.-Dumont University Hospital Centre in Moncton. He served as its CEO and scientific director for nearly 25 years before stepping down from that role in 2021 while continuing as scientific director until 2022.

His research has focused on the molecular biology of cancer and translation of genomic and molecular discoveries into precision oncology; more recent work includes liquid biopsy and circulating biomarkers, particularly approaches intended to predict treatment response. His research bridges molecular cancer biology and precision diagnosis and treatment.

During his tenure as CEO, he co-led the planning and funding application that led to the establishment of the New Brunswick Centre for Precision Medicine. The centre was developed through a partnership involving ACRI and the Université de Moncton to support interdisciplinary research in precision medicine and biomedical innovation. He is currently senior scientist and holds of the R.R. Léger Chair in Precision Cancer Research. He was a member of Governing Council of the Canadian Institutes of Health Research and more recently has work closely with the Terry Fox Research Institute and their Marathon of Hope Cancer Centres Network.

== Medical career ==
During his residency, Ouellette also established the Molecular Genetics Laboratory at the Dr. Georges-L.-Dumont University Hospital Centre, the first clinical molecular diagnostics laboratory in New Brunswick, at a time when molecular medicine was emerging as a component of routine clinical care. His work has included the translation of genomic and molecular technologies into clinical cancer diagnostics. Under his leadership, the laboratory introduced successive generations of molecular diagnostic technologies, including polymerase chain reaction (PCR), in situ hybridization, next-generation sequencing and, more recently, liquid-biopsy testing for cancer.

== Honours ==
Ouellette was awarded the Queen Elizabeth II Diamond Jubilee Medal in 2012 and the King Charles III Coronation Medal in 2025. He was appointed to the Order of New Brunswick in 2025. In 2006, he was named Alumni of the year by the LJR Foundation.

== Senate of Canada ==
On July 7, 2026, Prime Minister Mark Carney announced Ouellette's selection for appointment to the Senate of Canada to represent New Brunswick. He was formally summoned on July 9 by Governor General Louise Arbour, on the advice of the prime minister.
