= Miscouche =

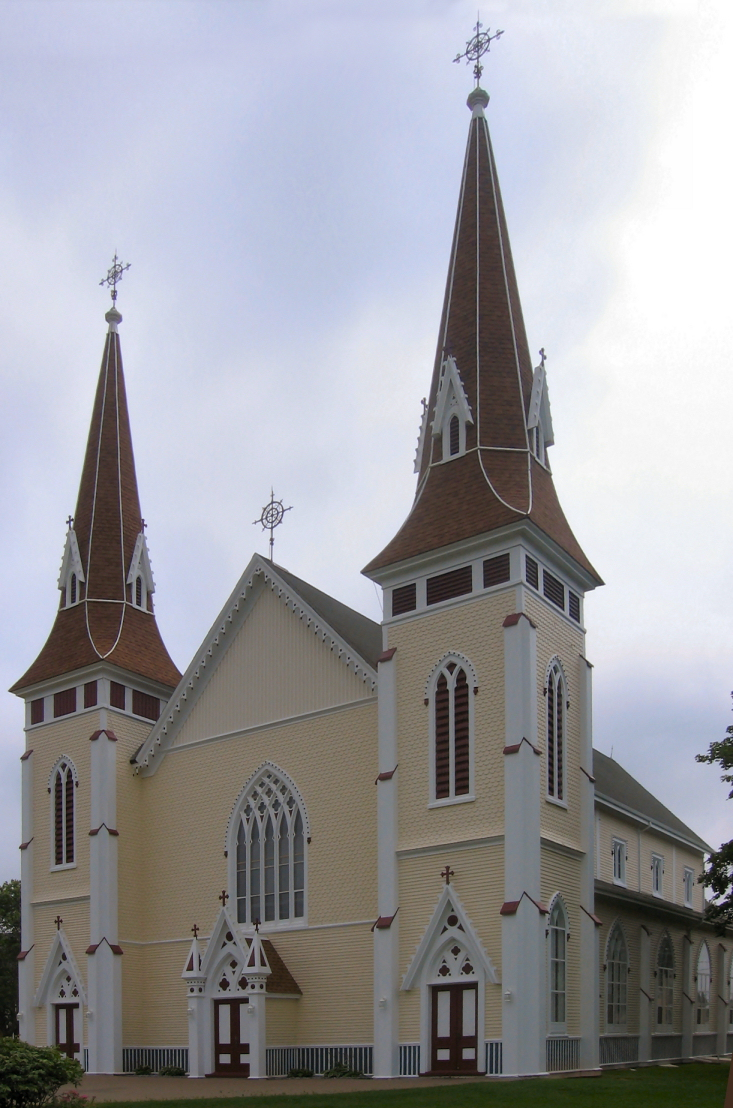
- St. John the Baptist Church, erected in 1892

- Location within Prince Edward Island Location within Canada Location within North America
- Coordinates: 46.43260°N 63.86825°W
- Country: Canada
- Province: Prince Edward Island
- County: Prince County
- Time zone: UTC-4 (Atlantic (AST))
  - Summer (DST): UTC-3 (ADT)
- Postal code: C0B 1T0
- Area code: 902
- Website: miscouche.ca

Miscouche (2021 population: 992) is a municipality that holds community status in Prince Edward Island, Canada. It is located in Prince County.

Incorporated in 1957, Miscouche is located 10 kilometres west of the City of Summerside. Its name is derived from the Mi'kmaq term for "Little grassy island".

Miscouche is east to the Evangeline Region, the province's largest francophone area comprising numerous Acadian settlements; 15% of Miscouche's population is considered francophone. Miscouche also serves as a service centre for some nearby rural communities, including Belmont, Central Lot 16, Southwest Lot 16, Grand River, St. Nicolas, and Linkletter.

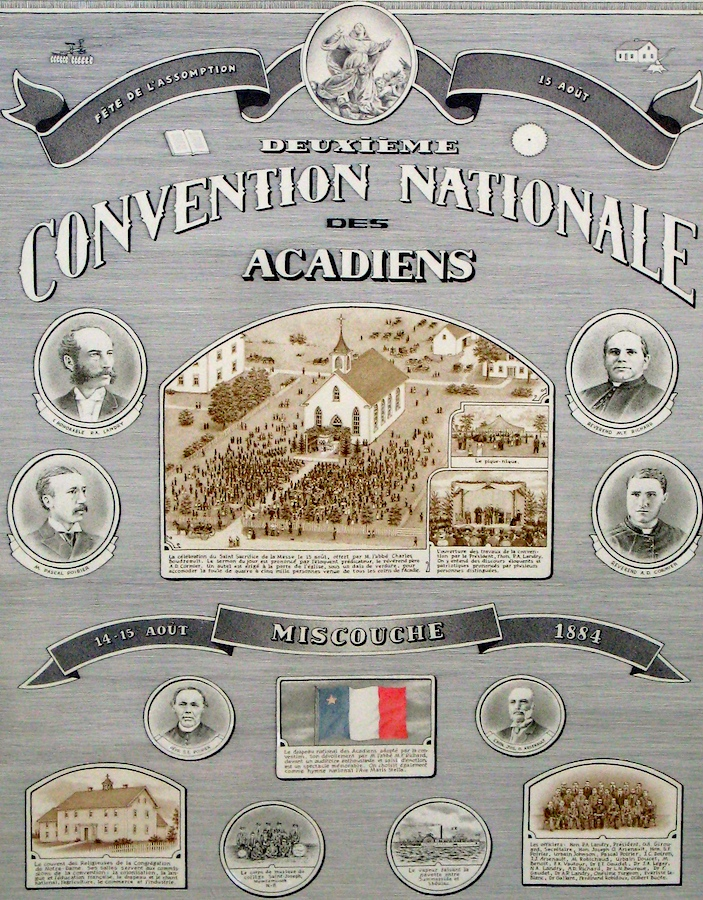
Poster for the Second Acadian National Convention, held in Miscouche in August 1884

== History ==
The Second Acadian National Convention was held in Miscouche in 1884, and was attended by approximately 5,000 Acadian delegates from across the Maritimes. The Convention saw the adoption of nearly all Acadian national symbols, including the Acadian flag. Because Miscouche hosted this historic convention, it was decided in 1964 that the Acadian Museum of Prince Edward Island be constructed next to the church. The Museum has been housed in a much larger facility since 1991 (still located on the same location as the former museum) and since 1996 it has served as one of the seven sites of Museum & Heritage Prince Edward Island, a division of the provincial Department of Community, Cultural Affairs and Labour.

St. John the Baptist Roman Catholic Church is one of the oldest wooden churches in Prince Edward Island. It features a historic Casavant organ. Extensive renovations were completed in recent years to restore much of the previous grandeur of the building.

== Demographics ==
Federal census population history of Miscouche
| Year | Pop. | ±% |
|---|---|---|
| 1961 | 676 | — |
| 1966 | 729 | +7.8% |
| 1971 | 750 | +2.9% |
| 1976 | 748 | −0.3% |
| 1981 | 752 | +0.5% |
| 1986 | 677 | −10.0% |
| 1991 | 672 | −0.7% |
| 1996 | 679 | +1.0% |
| 2001 | 766 | +12.8% |
| 2006 | 769 | +0.4% |
| 2011 | 869 | +13.0% |
| 2016 | 873 | +0.5% |
| 2021 | 992 | +13.6% |
Source: Statistics Canada

In the 2021 Census of Population conducted by Statistics Canada, Miscouche had a population of 992 living in 386 of its 401 total private dwellings, a change of 13.6% from its 2016 population of 873. With a land area of 3.49 km^{2} (1.35 sq mi), it had a population density of 284.2/km^{2} (736.2/sq mi) in 2021.

== Education ==
Miscouche Consolidated School was established in 1977. Grades Kindergarten through 9 are taught, with grades 10 -12 taught at Three Oaks Senior High in Summerside.
