= Flag of Acadia =

Flag of Acadia

Flag of Acadia specifications

The flag of Acadia (French: Drapeau de l'Acadie) represents the Acadian community of Canada. It was adopted on 15 August 1884, at the Second Acadian National Convention held in Miscouche, Prince Edward Island, by nearly 5,000 Acadian delegates from across the Maritimes.

It was designed by Father Marcel-François Richard, a priest from Saint-Louis-de-Kent, New Brunswick. Richard’s flag was a French tricolour, with a gold star in papal colours added to the blue band, representing devotion to the Virgin Mary and serving as a distinctive emblem of Acadian identity.

At the convention, Richard drew on military metaphors to argue that the Acadian movement required a visible emblem. He stated: “At the great 1881 convention held in Memramcook, we joined together in an orderly army set for battle, not to wage war on our brothers who share our religion, but to defend ourselves against any threat made to our nationhood,” concluding that such an army required “a national flag”. The flag was first raised publicly the following day, on 16 August 1884.

The Musée acadien at the Université de Moncton preserves the earliest known convention flag. Research by the museum states it consisted of a commercially manufactured French tricolour to which the star was added, a task traditionally attributed to Marie Babineau, in time for the closing session of the convention.

During the Second Convention, some delegates proposed “La Marseillaise” as the Acadian anthem, but Richard along with Pascal Poirier ultimately declared the adoption of "Ave maris stella" in 1884.

== Design ==
St-Louis-de-Kent, New Brunswick, birthplace of the Acadian flag

The flag is a vertical tricolour of blue, white and red, with a gold star in the upper hoist-side canton of the blue band. The star is widely known as Stella Maris (“star of the sea”), a traditional title of the Virgin Mary, and is used as a rallying symbol of Acadian identity.

The flag’s creation is often treated as part of the broader Acadian Renaissance of the late 19th and early 20th centuries, and its final form reflects both political and religious considerations of that period.

== Notable use ==
The Canadian Heraldic Authority’s register entry for the Société Nationale de l'Acadie (15 August 1995) describes the Acadian flag as “the national flag of Acadia”.

In 2004, during l’Année de l’Acadie, the Acadian flag was raised at Province House and displayed throughout the year’s Acadian celebrations.

In Nova Scotia, special “Acadian flag” number plates were established by regulation in 2011 (effective 2012).

== Gallery ==
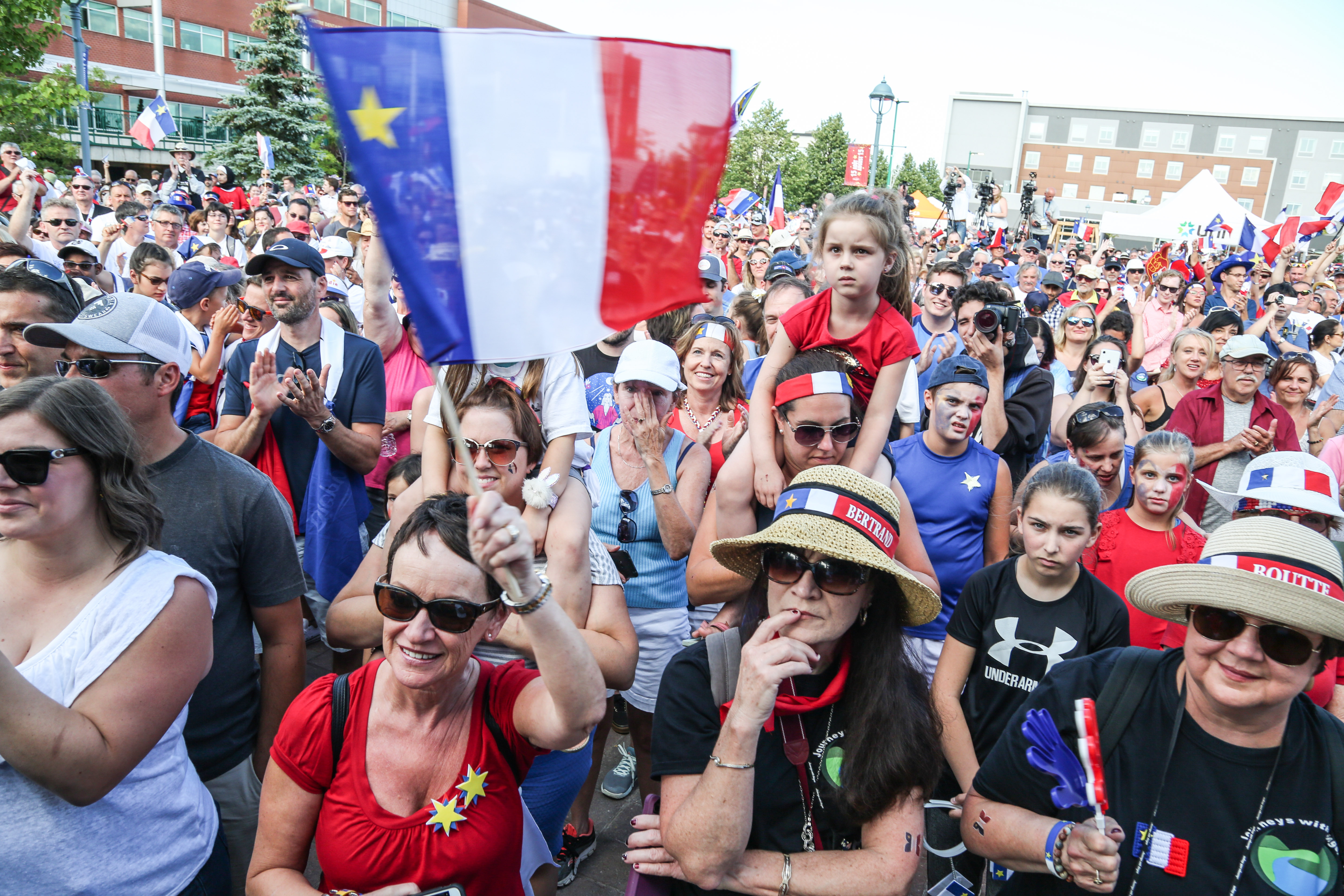
At the Congrès mondial acadien (2019)

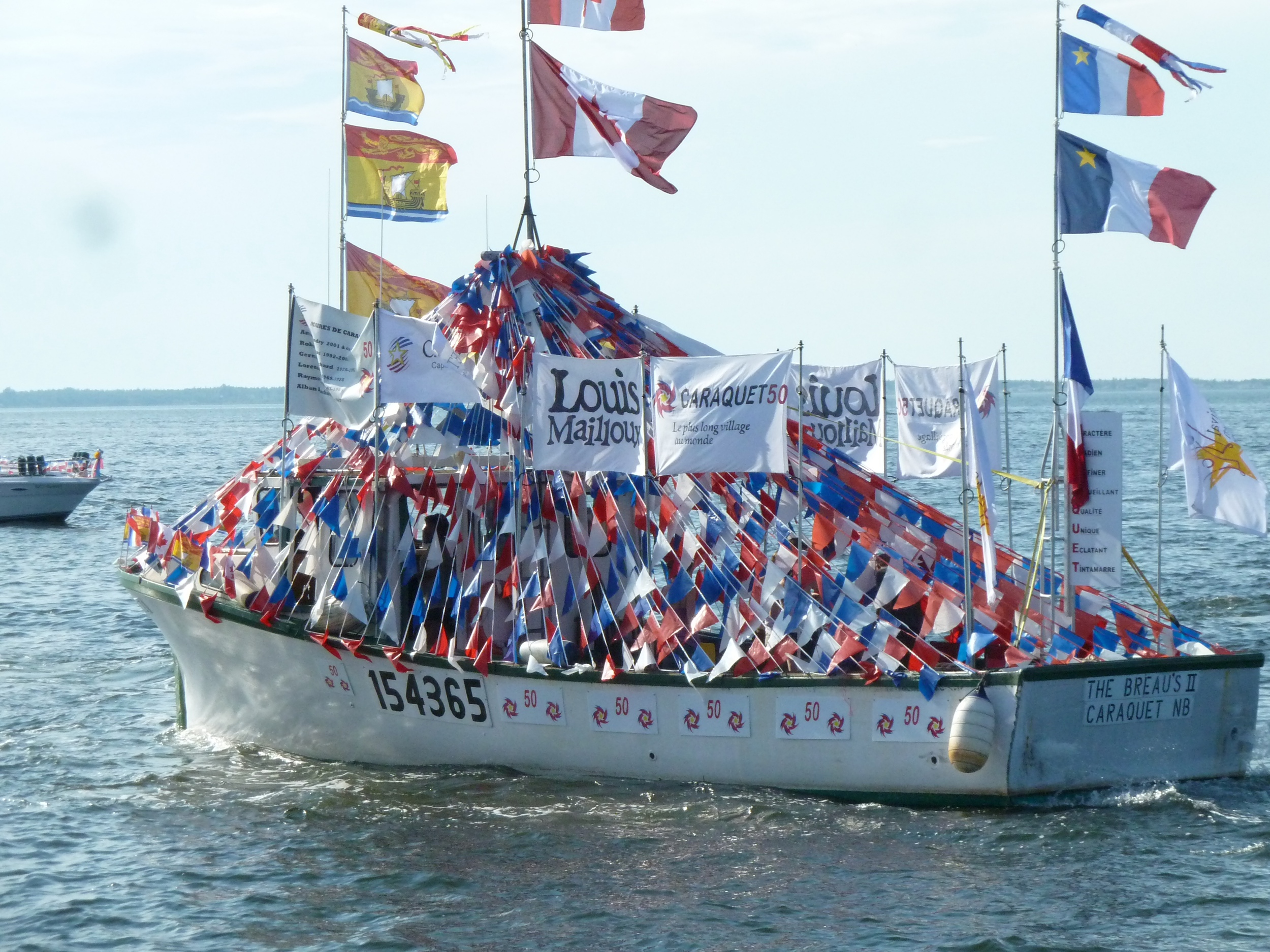
Blessing of the fleet in Caraquet

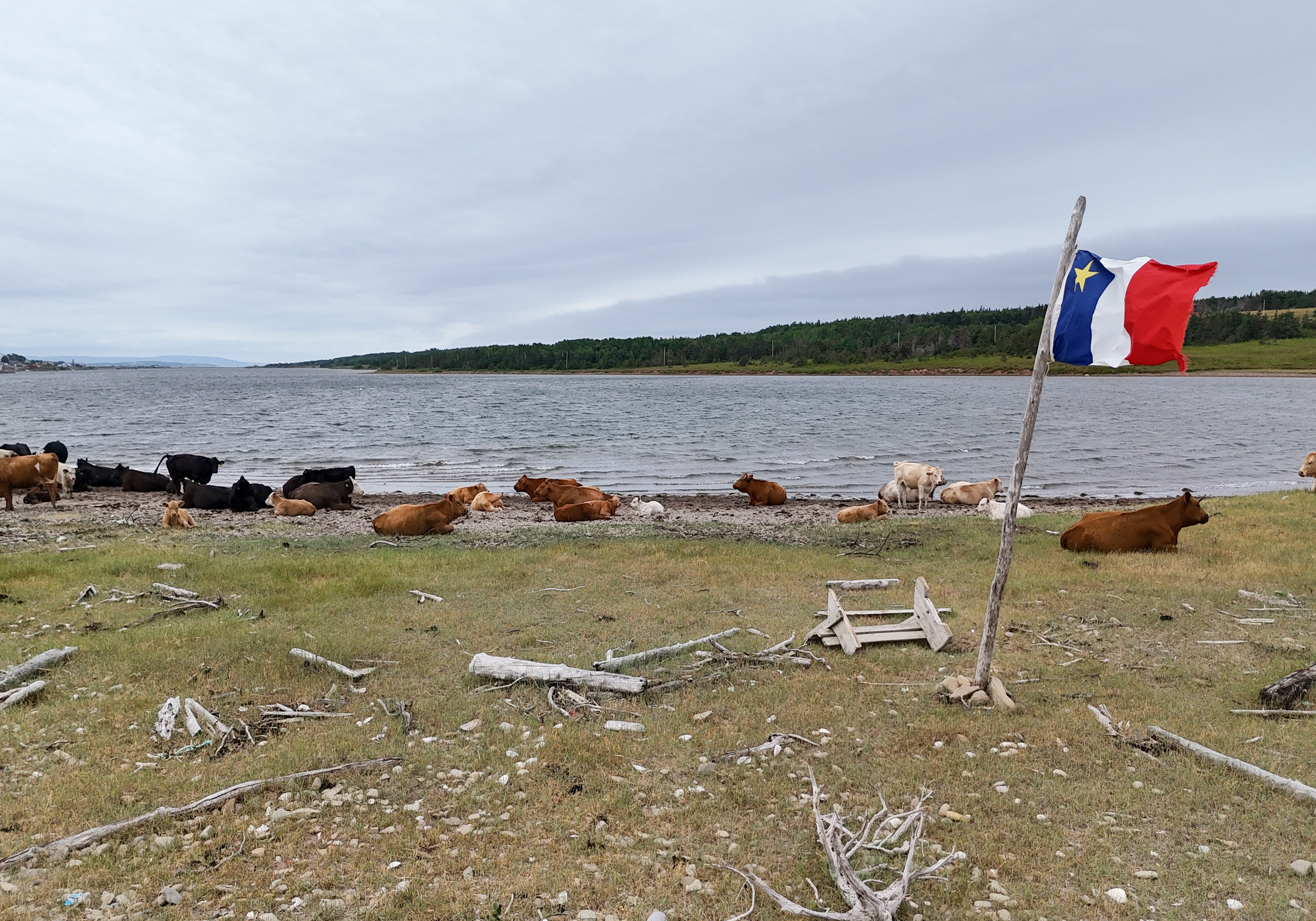
Acadian flag in Chéticamp

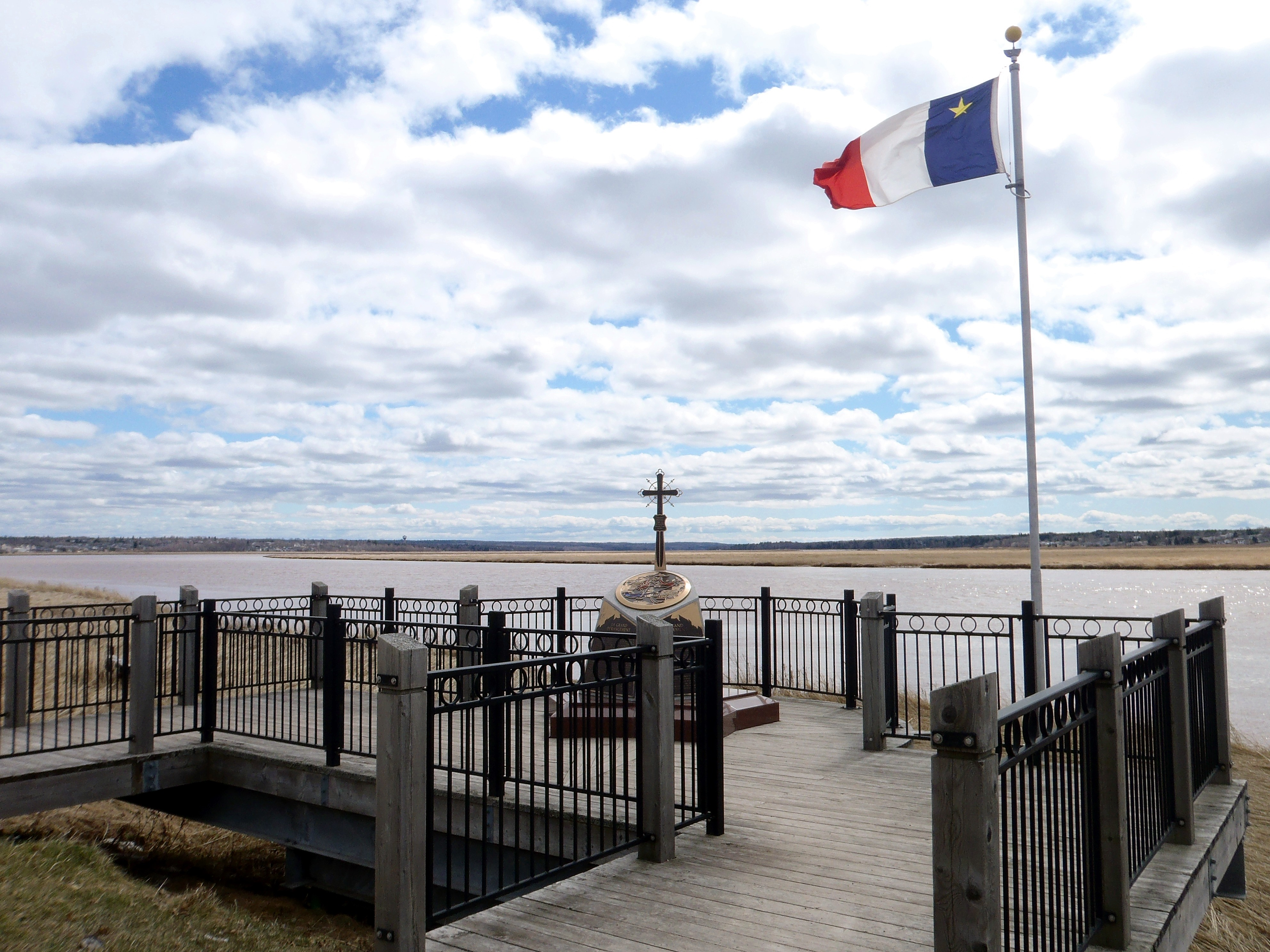
Displayed at the Acadian Memorial in Dieppe

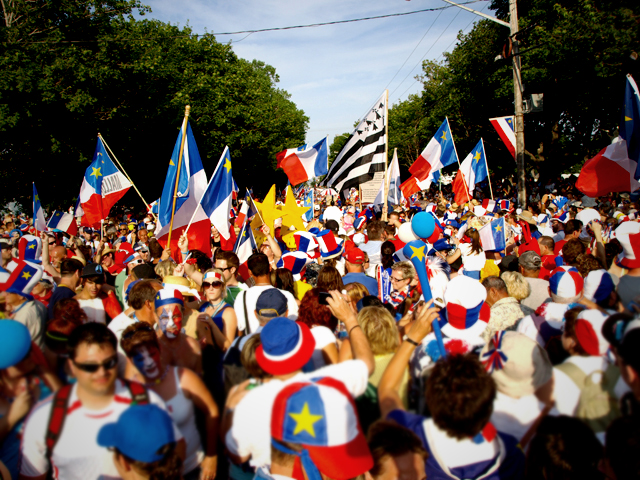
Acadian Festival in Caraquet

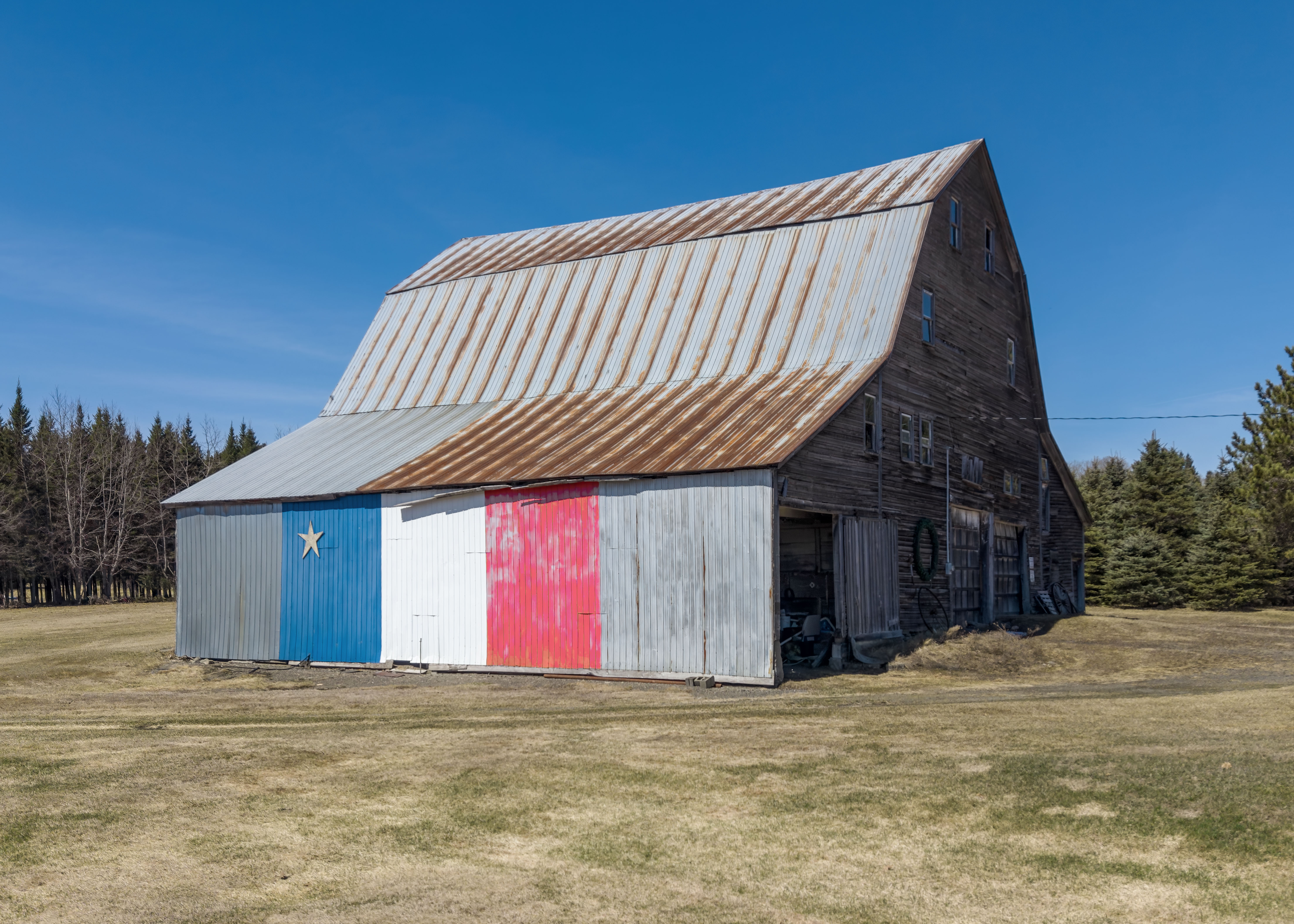
Painted on a barn in Grand Isle, Maine

== See also ==
- Flag of Acadiana
- Flag of France
