= Quebec slang =

Quebec slang may refer to:

- Quebec French lexicon
- Quebec French profanity
