= Henri Wittmann =

Canadian linguist from Quebec

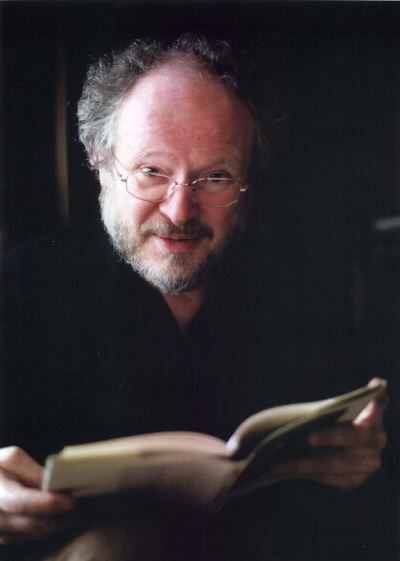
Henri Wittmann in 2002

Henri Wittmann (born 1937) is a Canadian linguist from Quebec. He is best known for his work on Quebec French.

== Biography ==
Henri (Hirsch) Wittmann was born in Alsace in 1937. After studying with André Martinet at the Sorbonne, he moved to North America and taught successively at the University of Colorado at Boulder, the University of Alberta in Edmonton, the University of Windsor and McGill University in Montreal before teaching in the French university system of Quebec, the Université du Québec à Trois-Rivières and at Rimouski as well as the Université de Sherbrooke. He retired from teaching in 1997, after an extensive tour of teaching and conferencing in France. In the following years, he became the first Director of the Presses universitaires de Trois-Rivières and emeritus researcher at the Centre d’Analyse des Littératures Francophones des Amériques (CALIFA) at Carleton University in Ottawa.

As a comparatist, Wittmann contributed to the study of the morphology of a number of languages and language families: Pre-Indo-European, Indo-European (Hittite, Italic, Romance, Germanic, Creole), Afro-Asiatic (Egyptian), African (Mande, Kwa, Bantu), Austronesian (Malagasy, Polynesian), Amerindian (Arawakan, Cariban). His work between 1963 and 2002 includes more than 140 items.

He is a life member since 1962 of the Linguistic Society of America (LSA). In 1965, he cofounded with André Rigault and Douglas Ellis the Linguistics Department at McGill University. In 1981, he was the cofounder, with Normand Beauchemin and Robert Fournier, of the Linguistic Society of Quebec (Association québécoise de linguistique) which he served for 10 years as president, secretary general and organizer of the annual meeting. In 1981 as well, he became the first Editor of the Revue québécoise de linguistique théorique et appliquée, a responsibility he assumed for the following 20 years.

Politically, Wittmann is known for his anarcho-syndicalist sympathies with strong links to the CNTU (Confederation of National Trade Unions), communautary and anti-war movements. In 1974-1978, he was at the center of a union conflict at the University of Quebec which changed the landscape of collective bargaining in the academic world. A specialist of the linguistic heritage of Quebec, he also is a stout defender of Quebec independence.

== Contributions to linguistics ==
Henri Wittmann is the first modern linguist to study non-standard forms of Quebec French (notably Joual, Magoua and Chaouin) in a theory-orientated and comparative framework.

In a general way, Wittmann, a student of André Martinet in the fifties, has been the first to apply the latter's principles of chain reactions in phonology to inflectional morphology. In Wittmann's view, the basic structure of the sentence is held together by functional items, with the lexical items filling in the blanks.

== Selected bibliography ==
- 1973. "Le joual, c'est-tu un créole?" La Linguistique 9:2.83-93.
- 1973. "The lexicostatistical classification of the French-based Creole languages." Lexicostatistics in genetic linguistics: Proceedings of the Yale conference, April 3–4, 1971, dir. Isidore Dyen, 89-99. La Haye: Mouton.
- 1974. "Le projet du français parlé à Trois-Rivières [II]." Annales de l'Association canadienne-française pour l'avancement des sciences 41:3.165-74. (With Jean-Pierre Tusseau).
- 1976. "Contraintes linguistiques et sociales dans la troncation du /l/ à Trois-Rivières." Cahiers de linguistique 6.13-22. Montréal: Presses de l'Université du Québec.,
- 1981. "Bom Sadek i bez li: la particule i en français." Revue québécoise de linguistique théorique et appliquée 1.177-96.
- 1982. "L'agglutination nominale en français colonial." Revue québécoise de linguistique théorique et appliquée 2:2.185-209.
- 1983, "Les réactions en chaîne en morphologie diachronique." Actes du 10e Colloque de la Société internationale de linguistique fonctionnelle, Université Laval, 9-11 mai. Québec: Presses de l'université Laval, pp. 285-292.
- 1983. "Le créole, c'est du français, coudon." Revue québécoise de linguistique théorique et appliquée 3:2.187-202.
- 1987. "Relexification phylogénétique et structure de C" en créole haïtien et en fon." Revue québécoise de linguistique théorique et appliquée 6:2.127-35.
- 1987. "Interprétation diachronique de la morphologie verbale du créole réunionnais." Revue québécoise de linguistique théorique et appliquée 6:2.137-50.
- 1990. "Morphologie et syntaxe des syntagmes [±wh] en créole haïtien et en fon." Proceedings of the Fourteenth International Congress of Linguists : Berlin/GDR, August 10-August 15, 1987. Berlin: Akademie Verlag, vol. 1, pp. 644-647.
- 1994. "Relexification et créologenèse." Actes du Congrès international des linguistes 15:4.335-38. Québec: Presses de l'Université Laval.
- 1994. "Le créole haïtien, langue kwa relexifiée: vérification d'une hypothèse 'P&P' ou élaboration d'astuces computationnelles?" Créolistique et grammaire générative, edited by Louis-Jean Calvet, 115-39. Paris: Sorbonne, Laboratoire de sociolinguistique (Plurilinguismes 8).
- 1995. "Grammaire comparée des variétés coloniales du français populaire de Paris du 17e siècle et origines du français québécois." "Le français des Amériques", edited by Robert Fournier & Henri Wittmann, 281-334. Trois-Rivières: Presses universitaires de Trois-Rivières.
- 1995. "La structure de base de la syntaxe narrative dans les contes et légendes du créole haïtien." Poétiques et imaginaires: francopolyphonie littéraire des Amériques, edited by Pierre Laurette & Hans-George Ruprecht, 207-18. Paris: L'Harmattan.
- 1996. "La forme phonologique comparée du parler magoua de la région de Trois-Rivières." Revue québécoise de linguistique théorique et appliquée 13.225-43.
- 1996. "L'Ouest français dans le français des Amériques: le jeu des isoglosses morphologiques et la genèse du dialecte acadien." L'Ouest français et la francophonie nord-américaine: actes du Colloque international de la francophonie tenu à Angers du 26 au 29 mai 1994, edited by Georges Cesbron, 127-36. Angers: Presses de l'Université d'Angers.
- 1996. "Contraintes sur la relexification: les limites imposées dans un cadre théorique minimaliste." Revue québécoise de linguistique théorique et appliquée 13.245-80.
- 1998. "Le français de Paris dans le français des Amériques." Proceedings of the International Congress of Linguists 16.0416 (Paris, 20-25 juillet 1997). Oxford: Pergamon.
- 1998. "Les créolismes syntaxiques du français magoua parlé aux Trois-Rivières." Français d'Amérique: variation, créolisation, normalisation (Actes du colloque, Université d'Avignon, 8-11 oct.), edited by Patrice Brasseur, 229-48. Avignon: Université d'Avignon, Centre d'études canadiennes.
- 1999. "Prototype as a typological yardstick to creoleness." The Creolist Archives Papers On-line, Stockholms Universitet.
- 1999. "Non-existential analogues of the verb to be in West African Languages, in Haitian Creole and in Magoua French." Paper, 9th International Conference on Creoles Studies.
- 2001. "Lexical diffusion and the glottogenetics of creole French." CreoList debate, parts I-VI, appendixes 1-9. The Linguist List, Eastern Michigan University & Wayne State University. (https://web.archive.org/web/20140511211442/http://listserv.linguistlist.org/archives/creolist.html).
