= Magoua =

Magoua (French pronunciation: [maɡwa]) is a particular dialect of basilectal Quebec French spoken in the Trois-Rivières area, between Trois-Rivières and Maskinongé. Long before a military fort was constructed there, Trois-Rivières became in 1615 the first stronghold of the coureurs des bois outside the city of Québec. Magoua is the ethnonym applied to their descendants in the area. Magoua is the most conservative of all Quebec French varieties, including Joual. It preserves the sontaient ("étaient") characteristic of Métis French and Louisiana French, has a creole-like past tense particle tà and has old present-tense contraction of a former verb "to be" that behave in the same manner as subject clitics.

Its name may derive from a word in Atikamekw: Makwa (French: huard), which means loon (Gavia immer).

== Morphology and vocabulary ==
Magoua	Standard French	English
mouén	moi, je	I
toué	toi, tu	you
(mouén) ch(u) tà ben màlàd	j’étais très malade	I was very sick
(mouén) chu la pis j’rès	j’y suis, j'y reste	I am here, and I stay
i son tà deus euzot	ils étaient deux	There were two of them
Ti-Oui i ben màlàd	Louis est très malade	Louis is very sick
Ti-Oui i tà ben màlàd	Louis était très malade	Louis was very sick
Ti-Oui tà pour t’aider	Louis t’aurait aidé	Louis would have helped you
tà mér tu la?	ta mère est-elle là?	Is your mother at home?
tà mér tà tu la?	ta mère était-elle là?	Was your mother at home?
(nouzot) ouen tà pour viend	nous serions venus	We would have come
vouzot tà àprà bouér	vous étiez en train de boire	You all were drinking
m’a fer sa	je le ferai	I will do it
t'a fer sa	tu le feras	You will do it
ouan alé wér wér si la djòb tà fèt	nous irons voir si le travail a été vraiment fait.	We will go and see if the job was really done
mon kien	le mien	mine
ton kien	le tien	yours
à gar	à la gare	at the train station
dan kour	dans la cour	in the yard
dan kor	dans le corps	in the body
ya ben kàrant onz d'skotch dan kor	Il a bien quarante onces de scotch dans le corps	He must have been drinking 40 ounces of Scotch
kòsen	vieillerie, truc, chose, affaire	old stuff
èn plènté d'kosen	une grosse quantité d'objets divers	plenty of stuff
ranmàs té kòsen pi dékris	prends tes affaires et vas-t’en	Pick up your things and scram!
tokàp	pénis, sans allure, con	penis, idiot
tokàpin	conne	idiotic woman
parlé màgoua	parler magoua	to speak Magoua, "comme les gens de chez nous"
èn cour d'Màgoua	une cour en désordre où on trouve de tout	a courtyard that looks like Ali Baba's cave
en vrà Màgoua	un Magoua de souche; un vrai débrouillard	a person of Magoua descent; someone without "proper European" manners; a resourceful person

== Bibliography ==
- Demharter, Cheryl A. 1980. «Les diphtongues du français canadien de la Mauricie.» The French Review 53.848-864.
- Demharter, Cheryl A. 1981. Une Étude phonologique du français parlé à Sainte-Flore, Province de Québec. Tulane University, New Orleans: Ph.D. dissertation.
- Deshaies, Denise. 1974. A socio-phonetic study of a Quebec French community: Trois-Rivières. University College of London: Doctoral thesis, 390 p.
- Deshaies, Denise. 1982. "Le français parlé à Trois-Rivières et le français parlé dans la ville de Québec". Langue et Société au Québec, Québec, 11-13 novembre 1982 (Atelier 215).
- Deshaies, Denise. 1984. "Deux analyses sociolinguistiques: Trois-Rivières et Québec". In Michel Amyot & Gilles Bibeau (ed.), Le statut culturel du français au Québec. Québec: Éditeur officiel du Québec, vol. 2, p. 206–208.
- Hardy, René. 2015. «Magouas et fiers de l’être.» La Gazette de la Mauricie, 9 janvier.
- Michaud, Émmanuel. 2014. Ni Amérindiens ni Eurocanadiens: une approche néomoderne du culturalisme métis au Canada. Thèse Ph.D., Université Laval, Québec.
- Wittmann, Henri, 1976. «Contraintes linguistiques et sociales dans la troncation du /l/ à Trois-Rivières.» Cahiers de linguistique de l'Université du Québec 6.13-22.
- Wittmann, Henri (1995), "Grammaire comparée des variétés coloniales du français populaire de Paris du 17e siècle et origines du français québécois" (PDF), in Fournier, Robert & Henri Wittmann; Wittmann, Henri (eds.), Le français des Amériques, Trois-Rivières: Presses universitaires de Trois-Rivières, pp. 281–334
- Wittmann, Henri (1996), "La forme phonologique comparée du parler magoua de la région de Trois-Rivières" (PDF), in Fournier, Robert (ed.), Mélanges linguistiques, Trois-Rivières: Presses universitaires de Trois-Rivières, pp. 225–243
- Wittmann, Henri, 1998. Les créolismes syntaxiques du français magoua parlé aux Trois-Rivières." Français d'Amérique: variation, créolisation, normalisation ('Actes du colloque, Université d'Avignon, 8-11 oct. 1996'), dir. Patrice Brasseur, 229-48. Avignon: Université d'Avignon, Centre d'études canadiennes.
- Wittmann, Henri, 1999. "Les équivalents non existentiels du verbe être dans les langues de l'Afrique de l'Ouest, en créole haïtien et en français magoua." Communication, 9e Congrès international des études créoles, Aix-en-Provence, 24-29 juin 1999. English abstract: "Non-existential analogues of the verb to be in West African Languages, in Haitian Creole and in Magoua French."
- Wittmann, Henri, 2001. "Les Magouas aux Trois-Rivières." Conférence, Premier Séminaire annuel du Centre d'analyse des langues et littératures francophones d'Amérique, Carleton University, Ottawa, mars 2001.

== See also ==
- Joual
- Chaouin
- Quebec French
- Trois-Rivières
- Henri Wittmann
