= AQL =

Aql may refer to:

- 'Aql, in Islamic philosophy and theology, the intellect or rationality
- Aquila (constellation), constellation abbreviation, as standardized by the International Astronomical Union
- Algic languages, by ISO 639-5 language code
- Said Aql (1912–2014), Lebanese poet, writer, playwright and language reformer
- Aql (company), a telecommunications company based in Leeds, UK

AQL may refer to:

- Acceptable quality limit, the worst-case quality level, expressed as a percentage of defects in a population, that is still considered acceptable
- Association québécoise de linguistique, the Quebec Linguistic Society
- ArangoDB Query Language, the query language for the ArangoDB database system

== See also ==
- Marvelous AQL, former name of the Japanese video game developer and anime producer Marvelous
