= Joual =

Sociolect of Québécois French originating amongst the working class

- joual
- Native to: Canada
- Region: Montreal
- Language family: Indo-European: Italic; Latino-Faliscan; Latin; Romance; Italo-Western; Western Romance; Gallo-Romance; Oïl; French; Canadian French; Quebec French; Joual

Language codes
- ISO 639-3: –
- Glottolog: None
- Linguasphere: 51-AAA-hqb

Joual (French pronunciation: [ʒwal]) is an accepted name for the linguistic features of Quebec French that are associated with the French-speaking working class in Montreal which has become a symbol of national identity for some. Joual has historically been stigmatized by some, and celebrated by others. While Joual is often considered a sociolect of the Québécois working class, many feel that perception is outdated, with Joual becoming increasingly present in the arts.

Speakers of Quebec French from outside Montreal usually have other names to identify their speech, such as Magoua in Trois-Rivières, and Chaouin south of Trois-Rivières. Linguists tend to eschew this term, but historically some have reserved the term Joual for the variant of Quebec French spoken in Montreal.

Both the upward socio-economic mobility among the Québécois, and a cultural renaissance around Joual connected to the Quiet Revolution in the Montreal East-End have resulted in Joual being spoken by people across the educational and economic spectrum. Today, many Québécois who were raised in Quebec during the 20th century (command of English notwithstanding) can understand and speak at least some Joual. Joual is also commonly spoken in a few Francophone communities in Ontario, such as Hearst.

== History ==
The creation of Joual can be traced back to the "era of silence", the period from the 1840s to the 1960s and the start of the Quiet Revolution. The "era of silence" was marked with stark stigmatization of the common working man. Written documents were not shared with the typical working class man, and the very strict form of French that was used by elites excluded a majority of the population. The Quiet Revolution during the 1960s was a time of awakening, in which the Quebec working class demanded more respect in society, including wider use of Québécois in literature and the performing arts. Michel Tremblay is an example of a writer who deliberately used Joual and Québécois to represent the working class populations of Quebec. Joual, a language of the working class, quickly became associated with slang and vulgar language. Despite its continued use in Canada, there are still ideologies present which place a negative connotation on the use of Joual.

== Origin of the name ==
Although coinage of the name joual is often attributed to French-Canadian journalist André Laurendeau, who in October 1959 wrote an article in Le Devoir criticizing the quality of the French language spoken by French Canadian students, the usage of this term throughout French-speaking Canada likely predates this text.

The actual word Joual is the representation of how the word cheval (Standard French: [ʃəval], 'horse') is pronounced by those who speak Joual. ("Horse" is used in a variation of the phrase parler français comme une vache 'to speak French like a cow', i.e. to speak French terribly; hence, a put-down of the Québécois dialect.) The weak schwa vowel [ə] disappeared. Then the voiceless [ʃ] was voiced to [ʒ], thereby creating [ʒval]. Next, the [v] at the beginning of a syllable in some regional dialects of French or even in very rapid speech in general weakened to become the semi-vowel [w] written ⟨ou⟩. The end result is the word [ʒwal] transcribed as Joual.

== Most notable or stereotypical linguistic features ==
Diphthongs are normally present where long vowels would be present in standard French. There is also the usage of sontaient, sonté (ils étaient, ils ont été).

Although moé and toé are today considered substandard slang pronunciations of moi and toi, these were the original pronunciations of ancien régime French used in all provinces of Northern France, by the royalty, aristocracy, and common people. After the 1789 French Revolution, the standard pronunciation in France changed to that of a previously-stigmatized form in the speech of Paris, but Quebec French continued to evolve from the historically older dialects, having become isolated from France following the 1760 British conquest of New France.

Joual shares many features with modern Oïl languages, such as Norman, Gallo, Picard, Poitevin and Saintongeais though its affinities are greatest with the 17th century koiné of Paris. Speakers of these languages of France predominated among settlers to New France.

It could be argued that at least some aspects of more modern Joual are further linguistic contractions of standard French. D'la (de la) is an example where the word de has nearly fallen out of usage over time and has become contracted. This argument does apply to other words, and this phenomenon has become widespread throughout contemporary French language.

A defining characteristic of the sociolect is the deliberate use of the pronoun tu to indicate a question. The pronoun maintains its traditional usage, that of representing the second person singular, but is also used in conjunction with a verb, to indicate a question. Tu is used, for this purpose, regardless of the technically relevant grammatical person. This is because tu, in this use-case, is a contraction of the antiquated t-il particle originating from 13th century France, which was used to indicate a question. For example, in metropolitan french, a question may be asked as simply "Veut-il manger?" whereas in Joual, it may be asked as "Il veux-tu manger?"

Another significant characteristic of Joual is the liberal use of profanities called sacre in everyday speech.

=== Words of English origin ===
There are a number of English loanwords in Joual, although they have been stigmatized since the 1960s, instead favoring alternative terms promoted by the Office québécois de la langue française. The commonality of English loanwords in Joual is attributed to the unilingually anglophone nature of the factory owners, business higher-ups, and industrial supervisors which employed the majority of French-speaking blue-collar workers throughout 20th century. This need to use English in workplace environments, when referring to technical elements of the worker's labour, caused the gradual integration of English loanwords into French. These words would eventually come to be conjugated and integrated as though they were traditionally French words (such as "Check" becoming the verb "Chequer"). The usage of deprecated anglicisms varies both regionally and historically. In the table below are a few common Joual words of English origin.

| Joual word | Pronunciation (approximation) | Standard French word (approximation) | English meaning | Example |
|---|---|---|---|---|
| Bécosse (f) | [bekɔs] | toilette extérieure (f) | outdoor toilet (from "back house") | le boss des bécosses (someone who behaves as though they are the boss) |
| Bécik (m) | [besɪk] or [bɛsɪk] | bicyclette (f), vélo (m) | bicycle | |
| Bike (m) | [bɑik] | motocyclette (f) | motorbike | |
| Bines (f) | [bɪn] | fèves (f) | beans | |
| Braker | [bʁeike] | freiner | to brake (verb) | |
| Breakeur (m) | [bʁeikɚ] | disjoncteur (m) | circuit breaker | |
| Bum (m) | [bʌm] | clochard (m) | bum, vagrant | |
| Chequer | [tʃɛke] | vérifier | to check something out (verb) | check ben ça ("check this out") |
| Chum (m, sometimes f) | [tʃɔm] | copain (m), ami (m), amie (f) | boyfriend or male friend, occasionally female friend | |
| Domper | [dõpe] | jeter, rompre avec | to throw out (rubbish) or to break up with someone (verb) | domper la puck (in hockey-"dumping the puck") |
| Flat (m) | [flat] | crevaison (f), plongeon sur le ventre (m) | flat tyre or belly flop (in the pool) | |
| Frencher | [fʁɛntʃe] | embrasser (avec langue) | to French kiss (verb) | |
| Froque (f) | [fʁʌk] | manteau (m) | jacket | |
| Hood (m) | like in English or [ʊd] | capot (m) | hood of a car | |
| Lift (m) | [lɪft] | | lift (as in giving someone a lift in a vehicle) | |
| Pinotte (f) | like in English, but with a shorter i | arachide (f) | peanut, also street slang for "amphetamines" | |
| States (les) | [steːts] | États-Unis (les) | the United States | |
| Tank (m) | [tẽːk] | réservoir (m) | container, tank à gaz: "fuel tank" | |
| Toaster (m) | [tostɚ] | grille-pain (m) | toaster | |
| Tough | [tɔf] | dur, difficile | tough | |
| Truck (m) | [tʁɔk] | camion (m) | truck | |
| Skidoo (m) | [skidu] | motoneige (f) | snowmobile (from Bombardier's "Ski-Doo") | |
| Screen (m) | [skɻiːŋ] | moustiquaire (f) | screen of a window | |
| Windshield | [wɪnʃiːl] | pare-brise (m) | windshield | |

Some words were also previously thought to be of English origin, although modern research has shown them to be from regional French dialects:

- Pitoune (log, cute girl, loose girl): previously thought to come from "happy town" although the word pitchoune exists in dialects from southern France (possibly coming from the Occitan word pichona, "little girl"), now used to mean "cute girl".
- Poutine: was thought to come from "pudding", but some have drawn a parallel with the Occitan language (also called Provençal or Languedoc) term podinga, a stew made of scraps, which was the previous use of the term in Montreal.

=== Glossary ===
| Joual | French | English |
|---|---|---|
| toé | toi (from classic French pronunciation of toi) | you (singular, oblique) |
| moé | moi (from classic French pronunciation of moi) | me |
| pis, pis quoi | et puis, puis quoi | and, So what |
| moé j'vo [ʒvɔ] or j'va [ʒvʌ] | moi je vais au/a la | I will, I am going |
| Çé | c'est | It is |
| Lé | Les | The (plural) |
| Ço [sɔ] | Ça | That |
| Po [pɔ] | Pas | Not |
| Lo [ʟɔ] | Là | There |
| j'fa, j'fasse, je fasse | je fais | I am doing |
| D'la | De la | Of the (feminine), from the (feminine), some (feminine), a quantity of (feminine) |
| té, t'es | tu es | you are |
| Yé | Il est | He is, it is |
| tsé (tsé là), t'sais | tu sais | you know |
| je s'ré | je serai | I will be |
| j'cres, j'cré | je crois | I believe |
| pantoute | pas du tout (de pas en tout) | not at all |
| y | il | he |
| a, a'l'o | elle, elle a | she, she has |
| ouais or ouin | oui | yeah, yep |
| y'o [jɔ] | il y a, il a | there is, he has |
| toul', tou'l' | tout le | all of the |
| icitte | ici | here |
| ben | bien | well / very / many (contextual) |
| tu d'ben | peut-être | maybe |
| bengadon, ben r'gardon, ben gardon | bien regarde-donc | well look at |
| Ga don ço, gadon ço, r'gardon ço | Regarde donc ça | Look at that |
| su, d'su, de su | sur, dessus | on, over top of |
| su la, s'a | sur la | on the (feminine) |
| su'l | sur le | on the (masculine) |
| anyway, en tout co [ã tu̥ kɔ], entouco, entéco, ent'lé co, entouka | en tout cas, en tous les cas | in any case, however, anyway (from English "anyway" addition of this word is non-ubiquitous, but en tout co has broad usage) |
| Aweille!, Enweille! | Envoye! Bouge! Allez! | Send! Move! Go on! (contextual) |
| enweille don, àweille don | envoie donc, allez | come on |
| faite, fette | saoul | drunk |
| fette, faite, té faite | fini, tu es fini | finished, you are finished |
| nuitte | nuit | night |
| ti / 'tite, p'tite / p'tit | petit / petite | small (masculine / feminine) |
| déhor, d'wor, dewor, dowor | dehors | outside, get out (contextual) |
| boutte (masculine) | bout | end, tip, bit (un ti boutte = un petit bout = a little bit or a little while) |
| toutte | tout | everything, all, the whole |
| litte | lit | bed |
| tusuite, tudsuite, tud'suite, tu'd'suite, toud'suite | tout de suite | right now |
| astheure, asteur (from "à cette heure") | maintenant, couramment | now, currently, from now on |
| han? | hein? | eh? huh? or what? |
| heille | hé | hey |
| frette | froid | cold |
| fà | fait | make/do |
| s'fèque, s'fà que, sfàk | donc (ça fait que) | so, therefore |
| mèk, mainque, main que | lorsque (from old French « mais que ») | as soon as, upon |
| dins, dan lé | dans les | in the (plural) |
| cé | c'est, ceci est | this is |
| c'pos, cé po, s'po[spɔ] | ce n'est pas | it's not |
| end'ssour, end'ssou | en dessous | under |
| s'assir, s'assoère | s'asseoir | to sit down |
| ak, ac, a'ec, èk, èque | avec | with |
| boète [bwaɪ̯t] | boîte | box |
| à soère, à swère | ce soir | tonight |
| àmandonné, aman'né | à un moment donné | at some point, at any given time |
| bouette | boue | mud |
| c't'un, cé t'un, s't'un | c'est un | it's a |
| j'suis, chuis | je suis (un) | I am |
| garah, gararh | garage | garage (non-ubiquitous usage) |
| char | voiture | car, short for chariot |
| tarla, con, nono | stupide | dumb |
| kétaine, quétaine | de mauvais goût, ringard (France) | tasteless, cheesy (fashion) |
| fif, fifi | éfféminé | sissy, feminine male (can also mean queer, derogatory) |
| tapette (une) | pédé (un) | queer, feminine male, male homosexual or pre sex change male (all usage is derogatory) |
| grand slack | grand et mince | tall and skinny (from English "slack") |
| smatte (té), smartte (té) | sympatique, gentil | friendly, kind |
| plotte | chatte, vagin | cunt, whore, pussy, vagina (contextually derogatory) |
| graine, grène | pénis | Cock, penis (graine is the literal translation of the word seed, contextually derogatory) |
| botare | bâtard | bastard |
| eulle | l' le | the |
| étchoeuré | écœuré | tired (annoyed) |
| t'su, d'su | mettre sur | put on |
| vert (té) | inexpérimenté (tu es) | (you are) inexperienced (being new, "green", to something, vert is the literal translation of the word green) |
| troud'cu, trou'd'cu, trou d'cul | enfoiré, trou de cul | ass hole (contextually derogatory) |
| panel (un) | camionnette, fourgon | van (panel van, cargo van, non-ubiquitous usage) |
| jarret, hârret | mollet | calf |
| lulu | mèche (deux) | twintails (non-ubiquitous usage) |
| Drette lo | Ici même (droit là) | Right there |
| Ç'à d'l'air à ço, Ç'à d'l'air de'd ço | Ça ressemble à ça | It looks like that |
| J'te dis | Je te dis | I tell you |
| J'toute fourré, j's'tout fourré, schtout fourré | Je suis confus | I'm so confused, I'm all fucked up |
| J'cogne des clous | Je suis épuisé | I'm so tired |
| Checke-moé le don, | Regarde le (donc) lui | Look at him |
| Checke Fern, Checke checke | Regarde ça/lui/elle, Regarde | Look at him/her/that or simply look (gender neutral form, contextual, non-ubiquitous usage, circa 1980s but still holds meaning) |
| 'Stacoze de'd, stacoze de, C't-à-cause de, | c'est à cause de | it is because of |
| 'Stacé | C'est assez | That's enough |
| Viarge | Putain ! | Damn ! |
| Grouille (toé) | Dépêche-toi | Hurry up |
| ta yeul!, la yeul!, ferme ta boète!, la ferme!, la farme! | tais-toi! ferme ta gueule! | shut up!, shut your animal mouth! (derogatory), shut your box! (derogatory) |
| Y pue d'la yeul (referring to a human male, Y means Il singular third person male whereas A (pronounced à) means Elle singular third person female) | Ça pue de la gueule (animal), Il a la mauvaise haleine (human male) | He has a stinky animal mouth, He has bad breath, He stinks from the mouth (gueule directly translates to animal mouth, hence the sentence is derogatory if relating to a human male. Pue is the literal translation of a conjugation of the verb to stink) |
| Chus dan marde | Je suis dans le pétrin (Je suis dans la merde) | I'm in big trouble (I'm in shit) |

== In popular culture ==
The two-act play Les Belles-sœurs by Canadian writer Michel Tremblay premiered in 1968 at the Théâtre du Rideau Vert in Montreal. Many consider it to have had a profound impact on Canadian culture, as it was one of the first times Joual was seen on a national stage. The play follows a working-class woman named Germaine in Montréal. After winning a million trading stamps, she invites her friends over to help paste them into booklets to redeem them. But Germaine is unsuspecting of her jealous friends who are envious of her winnings. The fact that the play was originally written in Joual is very important to the socio-linguistic aspect of the women. The characters all come from the working class and for the most part, speak in Joual, which at the time was not seen on the main stage. The play was cited at the time as a "radical element among Quebec critics as the dawn of a new era of liberation, both political and aesthetic".

When Les Belles-sœurs premiered in Paris, France in 1973 as it was originally written, in Joual, it was met with some initial criticism. One critic described it as difficult to understand as ancient Greek. Tremblay responded, "a culture should always start with speak to herself. The ancient Greeks spoke to each other". The popularity of the play has since caused it to be translated into multiple languages, raising controversies in the translation community over retaining the authenticity of Les Belles-sœurs even when not performed in the original dialect of Joual.

Writing in Joual gave Tremblay an opportunity to resist cultural and linguistic "imperialism" of France, while signifying the secularization of Québec culture.

== See also ==
- Anglicism
- Association québécoise de linguistique
- Basilect
- Bilingualism
- Canada
- Canadian French
- Canadien (disambiguation)
- Chaouin
- Chiac
- Cockney
- Demographics of Quebec
- Franglais
- French Canadian
- French Canadians
- French language in Canada
- Language contact
- Language planning
- Languages of Canada
- Linguistic description
- Magoua
- Mixed language
- Mockney
- Post-creole continuum
- Quebec (disambiguation)
- Quebec English
- Quebec French
- Quebec French lexicon
- Quebec French phonology
- Quebec French profanity
- Quebecer (disambiguation)
- Québécois
- Sociolinguistics
- Standard French
