= Quebec French phonology =

Sound system of French in Quebec

The phonology of Quebec French is more complex than Modern Parisian French. Quebec French has conserved phonemic distinctions between /a/ and /ɑ/, /ɛ/ and /ɛː/, /ø/ and /ə/, /ɛ̃/ and /œ̃/. The latter phoneme of each minimal pair has disappeared in Parisian French, and only the last distinction has been maintained in Meridional French though all of those distinctions persist in Swiss and Belgian French.

== Vowels ==
Oral
	Front			Central	Back
	unrounded		rounded	Central	Back
	short	long	rounded	Central	Back
Close	i		y		u
Close-mid	e		ø	ə	o
Open-mid	ɛ	ɛː	œ	ɞ	ɔ
Open	a				ɑ ɒː

Nasal
	Front		Back
	unrounded	rounded	Back
Mid	ẽ	œ̃˞ ~ ɚ̃	õ
Open	ã	œ̃˞ ~ ɚ̃	

The phonemes /œ/ and /ə/ are both realized as [ɞ] (parce que 'because', [paʁ̥skɞ]), but before /ʁ/, /œ/ is either open to [ɶː] or diphthongized to [aœ̯] when it is in the last syllable.

Tense vowels (/i, y, u/) are realized as their lax ([ɪ, ʏ, ʊ]) equivalents when the vowels are both short (not before /ʁ/, /ʒ/, /z/ and /v/, but the vowel /y/ is pronounced [ʏː] before /ʁ/) and only in closed syllables. Therefore, the masculine and feminine adjectives petit 'small' and petite ([p(ø)ti] and [p(ø)tit] in France) are [p(ɞ)t͡si] and [p(ɞ)t͡sɪt] in Quebec. In some areas, notably Beauce, Saguenay–Lac-Saint-Jean, and (to a lesser extent) Quebec City and the surrounding area, even long tense vowels may be laxed.

The laxing of the high vowels (/i/, /u/, and /y/) in the specified context always occurs in stressed syllables, (lutte [lʏt] 'struggle'), but it sometimes does not occur in unstressed syllables: culture can be either [kylt͡sʏːʁ] or [kʏlt͡sʏːʁ]. The lax allophone of a high vowel may also appear in open syllables by assimilation to a lax vowel in a following syllable: musique 'music' can be either [myzɪk] or [mʏzɪk]. The lax vowel may be retained in derived words even if the original stressed lax vowel has disappeared: musical can be [myzikal] or [mʏzikal]. Also, the lax allophone may sometimes occur in open syllables by dissimilation, as in toupie 'spinning top' [tupi] or [tʊpi], especially in reduplicative forms such as pipi 'pee-pee' [pipi] or [pɪpi]. Such phenomena are conditioned lexically and regionally. For example, for the word difficile 'difficult', the standard pronunciation [d͡zifisɪl] is found throughout Quebec, but the alternative pronunciations [d͡zifɪsɪl], [d͡zɪfɪsɪl] and [d͡zɪfsɪl] are also used.

The phonemes /a/ and /ɑ/ are distinct. /a/ is not diphthongized, but some speakers pronounce it [æ] if it is in a closed syllable or an unstressed open syllable, as in French of France. In general, the pronunciation in final open syllables is phonemically /ɑ/, but it is phonetically ranges between [ɑ] or [ɔ] speaker-to-speaker (Canada [kanadɑ] or [kanadɔ]), the latter being informal. There are some exceptions; the words la, ma, ta, sa, fa, papa and caca are always pronounced with the phoneme /a/. In internal open syllables, the vowel /ɑ/ is sometimes pronounced [ɒː] or [ɔː] (gâteau 'cake' [ɡɒːto] or [ɡɔːto]), which is considered to be informal. The vowel /ɑ/ is sometimes pronounced as [ɑʊ̯] in final closed syllables (pâte 'paste' [pɑʊ̯t]), but it is diphthongized as [ɑɔ̯] before /ʁ/ (tard 'late' [tɑɔ̯ʁ̥]). Otherwise, there are many words which are pronounced with the long /ɑ/ even though there is no circumflex: sable, espace, psychiatre, miracle, mardi and as (noun), etc. There are some words that are pronounced with the short /a/, even though there is a circumflex; they are exceptions: câlin and bâbord, etc. Some words are pronounced differently in different regions; for example, the words lacet, nage and crabe are exceptions and are pronounced with the short /a/ in Eastern Quebec but the long /ɑ/ in Western Quebec.

The phonemes /ɛ/ and /ɛː/ are always distinct. In open syllables, /ɛː/ is diphthongized to [ɛɪ̯] (pêcher is pronounced [pɛɪ̯ʃe]), but it is pronounced [ɛː] or [æː] before /ʁ/ (mairie "mayoralty" [mɛːʁi] or [mæːʁi]) and /v/ (trêve 'truce' [tʁ̥ɛːv]), and in other closed syllables, it is diphthongized to [ɛɪ̯], [ei̯], [æɪ̯] or [aɪ̯] (tête 'head' [tɛɪ̯t], [tei̯t], [tæɪ̯t] or [taɪ̯t]); on Radio-Canada, speakers pronounce [ɛɪ̯] in both open syllables and closed syllables.

Also, many words are pronounced with the long /ɛː/, even though there is no circumflex: aide, presse, cesse, caisse, graisse, sirène, scène, palmarès, etc. There are a few exceptions, which are pronounced with the short /ɛ/ phoneme even though there is a circumflex: êtes, bêche, extrême, suprême, pimbêche, prête (adjective), etc. Some words are pronounced differently in different regions; for example, the words arrête, haleine and baleine are exceptions: they are pronounced with short /ɛ/ in Eastern Quebec but with long /ɛː/ in Western Quebec.

Like in other dialects of French, the phonemes /i y u/ and /iː yː uː/ are not distinct in Quebec French. The spellings <î û oû> was the long /iː yː uː/ phonemes, had merged with the short counterparts very early on. Modern Quebec French, the /iː uː/ phoneme is used only in loanwords, mainly English (cheap [tʃiːp] cool [kuːl]).

The phoneme /ɔ/ is pronounced [ɒː] or [ɑɔ̯] (fort 'strong' [fɒːʁ] or [fɑɔ̯ʁ]) before /ʁ/.

The spelling ⟨oi⟩ phonemically is either /wa/ or /wɑ/ depending on the word (toi 'you' /twa/, but trois 'three' /tʁwɑ/), but when it is before /ʁ/ or /z/ in closed syllables, it is phonemically always /wɑ/: soir and framboise, etc. In joual, /wa/ can be pronounced [we] or [wɛ], but [ɛ] is found exceptionally in droit and froid and in inflexions of noyer and croire, as well as in soit. Those pronunciations are remnants from one of the founding French dialects. /wɑ/ is pronounced as [wɑ] in formal speech but becomes [wɔ] in informal speech. The ⟨oî⟩ spelling is phonemically /wɑ/. It is phonetically [wɑː] in formal speech, but it can also be pronounced in some additional different ways ([waɪ̯, wɛɪ̯, wei̯, wɛː, wɔː, wɒː]) in joual (boîte 'box' [bwaɪ̯t]). Also, there are many words which are pronounced with the long /wɑ/ even though there is no circumflex: coiffe, croissant, soirée and poivre, etc.

Another informal trait from 17th-century Parisian popular French is the tendency to open [ɛ] into [æ] in a final open syllable. On the other hand, in grammatical word endings and in the indicative forms of verb être (es and est), the [ɛ] is tensed into [e]. That is also common in France, but failure to tense the [ɛ] in Quebec is usually perceived as quite formal. However, Québécois usually pronounce [ɛ] when they are reading.

=== Nasal vowels ===
Apart from /ɔ̃/, the nasal vowels are very different from Modern Parisian French, but they are similar to traditional Parisian French and Meridional French. [ã] is pronounced exactly as in Meridional French: /ɛ̃/ → [ẽɪ̯̃] ~ [ãɪ̯̃], /ɑ̃/ → [ã] ~ [æ̃] (tempête 'storm' [tãpæɪ̯t]), quand 'when' [kæ̃]), /ɔ̃/ → [ɒ̃ʊ̯̃] (glaçon 'icicle' [ɡlæsɒ̃ʊ̯̃]), and /œ̃/ is pronounced [œ̃ʏ̯̃] ~ [ɚ̃] ~ [ʌ̃ɹ]. [æ̃] occurs only in open syllables. /ɛ̃/ and /ɔ̃/ are always diphthongized.

=== Diphthongization ===
Long and nasalized vowels (except [aː]) are generally diphthongized in closed syllables, but [ɛː], [ɔː], and [œː] are not diphthongized if they are before /v/ (with some exceptions: fève "bean", Lefebvre, orfèvre "goldsmith" and rêve "dream"):

- [ɛː] → [ɛɪ̯] ~ [ei̯] ~ [æɪ̯] ~ [aɪ̯], but [æɛ̯] ~ [aɛ̯] ~ [aɪ̯] before /ʁ/, as in fête [faɪ̯t] ~ [fæɪ̯t], Eng. "party"; père [pæɛ̯ʁ] ~ [paɛ̯ʁ] ~ [paɪ̯ʁ], Eng. "father"; fêter [fɛɪ̯te], Eng. "celebrate";
- [øː] → [øʏ̯], as in neutre [nøʏ̯tʁ̥], Eng. "neutral"
- [oː] → [oʊ̯], as in cause [koʊ̯z], Eng. "cause"
- [ɑː] → [ɑʊ̯], ([ɑɔ̯] before /ʁ/), as in pâte [pɑʊ̯t], Eng. "paste" bar [bɑɔ̯ʁ], Eng. "bar"
- [ɔː] → [ɑɔ̯] (only occurs before /ʁ/), as in bord [bɑɔ̯ʁ], Eng. "side"
- [œː] → [aœ̯] ~ [ɶœ̯] (only occurs before /ʁ/), as in cœur [kaœ̯ʁ] ~ [kɶœ̯ʁ], Eng. "heart"
- [iː] → [ɪi̯], as in livre [lɪi̯vʁ], Eng. "book/pound"
- [uː] → [ʊu̯], as in four [fʊu̯ʁ], Eng. "oven"
- [yː] → [ʏy̯], as in méduse [med͡zʏy̯z], Eng. "jellyfish"
- [ãː] → [ãʊ̯̃], as in banque [bãʊ̯̃k], Eng. "bank"
- [ẽː] → [ẽɪ̯̃] ~ [ãɪ̯̃], as in quinze [kẽɪ̯̃z] ~ [kãɪ̯̃z], Eng. "fifteen"
- [õː] → [ɒ̃ʊ̯̃], as in son [sɒ̃ʊ̯̃], Eng. "sound"
- [œ̃ː] → [œ̃ʏ̯̃], as in un [œ̃ʏ̯̃], Eng. "one"
- [wɑː] → [waɪ̯] ~ [wɛɪ̯] ~ [wei̯], as in boîte [bwaɪ̯t] ~ [bwei̯t], Eng. "box"

Diphthongs [ɑɔ̯], [ɑʊ̯], [aɛ̯], [aɪ̯], [ɑœ̯], [ãʊ̯̃], [ãɪ̯̃] and [waɪ̯] are the most exaggerated and so they are considered informal, but even some teachers use them. [ɑʊ̯] and [ãʊ̯̃] are rarely used in formal contexts. [wɑː] and [ãː] are never diphthongized except in joual. Diphthongs [ɛɪ̯], [oʊ̯], [øʏ̯], [ɪi̯], [ʊu̯], [ʏy̯], [ẽɪ̯̃] and [ɒ̃ʊ̯̃] are considered formal and usually go unnoticed by most speakers. [ɑː] and [ɔː] are not diphthongized by some speakers.

== Consonants ==
Consonant phonemes in Quebec French
		Labial	Dental/ Alveolar	Palatal	Velar/ Uvular
Nasal		m	n	ɲ	ŋ
Stop	voiceless	p	t		k
Stop	voiced	b	d		ɡ
Fricative	voiceless	f	s	ʃ	
Fricative	voiced	v	z	ʒ	
Approximant	plain		l	j	
Approximant	labial			ɥ	w
Rhotic		/ʀ/ (apical or dorsal, see below)			

Around 12 different rhotics are used in Quebec depending on region, age, education, and other things. The uvular trill [ʀ] has lately been emerging as a provincial standard, and the alveolar trill [r] was once used in informal speech in Montreal. In modern Quebec French, the voiced uvular fricative [ʁ] (though voiceless before and after voiceless consonants) is most common, but the uvular trill [ʀ] is often pronounced in clusters (br, dr, gr, vr, pr, tr, cr, fr): brun [bʀœ̃˞], treize [tʀ̥aɛ̯zə̆], etc.

The velar nasal [ŋ] is found in loanwords (ping-pong [pɪŋpɒŋ]), but is often found as an allophone of the palatal nasal [ɲ], the word ligne 'line' may be pronounced [lɪŋ].

In colloquial speech, the glottal fricatives [h]/[ɦ] are found as allophones of /ʃ/ and /ʒ/, respectively. They can also be pronounced as [ʃʰ] and [ʒʱ] if the original fricatives are not entirely relaxed. That is particularly found in the Beauce region to the point that the pronunciation is frequently stereotyped, but it can be found throughout Quebec as well as other French-speaking areas in Canada.

Dental stops are usually affricated before high front vowels and semivowels: in other words, /ty/, /ti/, /tɥ/, /tj/, /dy/, /di/, /dɥ/, /dj/ are then pronounced [t͡sy], [t͡si], [t͡sɥ], [t͡sj], [d͡zy], [d͡zi], [d͡zɥ], [d͡zj] (except in Gaspésie–Îles-de-la-Madeleine and Côte-Nord). Depending on the speaker, the fricative is more or less strong or sometimes even assimilates the stop in informal speech. For example, constitution may have any of the following pronunciations: /kɔ̃stitysjɔ̃/ → [kɒ̃ʊ̯̃st͡sit͡sysjɒ̃ʊ̯̃] → [kɒ̃ʊ̯̃ssisysjɒ̃ʊ̯̃].

In joual, some instances of final mute t may be pronounced:

lit /li/ → [lɪt].

There is also the special case of "debout" [dœ̈bʊt] 'standing up' and "ici" [isɪt] 'here' (sometimes actually written icitte). On the other hand, the t in but 'goal' and août 'August' are not pronounced in Quebec, but they are pronounced in France (increasingly for but). They often reflect centuries-old variations.

Many of the features of Quebec French are mistakenly attributed to English influence; however, the historical evidence shows that most of them descend from earlier forms from specific dialects and are forms that have since changed in France, or they are internal developments (changes that have occurred in Canada alone but not necessarily in all parts).

=== Consonant reduction ===
It has been postulated that the frequency of consonant reduction in Quebec French is caused by a tendency to pronounce vowels with more "strength" than consonants, a pattern that reverses that of European French.

Consonant clusters at the end of words are reduced and often lose altogether the last or two last consonants in both formal and informal Quebec French. The liquids /ʁ/ and /l/ seem to be especially likely to get dropped, as in table, /tabl/ → [tab], or astre, /astʁ/ → [ast] → [as] 'star'.

The phone /l/ in article determiners and even more in personal pronouns in most dialects does not exist in the mental representation of these words. As a matter of fact, pronouncing il and elle as [ɪl] and [ɛl] is seen as very formal and by some pedantic. Elle is further modified into [aː] in informal speech, a sound change that is similar to that of [ɛ] into [a] before /ʁ/.

In colloquial speech, the combination of the preposition sur + definite article is often abbreviated: sur + le = su'l; sur + la = su'a or sa; sur + les = ses. Sometimes dans + un and dans + les is abbreviated to just dun and dins. In the informal French of France, sur + le also becomes su'l, such as L'dimanche, i'est su'l pont dès 8 heures du mat ('On Sundays, he's hard at work from 8 a.m.'). No other contractions are used.

Some initial consonants are also reduced: [jœ̈l] gueule (France, [ɡœ̈l]), especially in the construction ta gueule [ta jœ̈l] "shut up". Many Québécois even write gueule as yeule.

=== Aspiration of voiceless plosives ===
In spoken Standard French, /k/, /p/ and /t/ are by and large regarded as unaspirated. However, in Quebec and certain other Canadian variants of spoken French, aspiration in those consonants is quite common. The voice onset time of these sounds produced by Québécoise francophones is, to some extent, longer than that of their French counterparts and so that they are often categorized as aspirated.

== Combinatory phenomena ==
=== Vowel harmonization and consonant assimilation ===
The high front vowels in Quebec French show a net tendency to be unvoiced or even lost, as in municipalité /mynisipalite/ → [myni̥si̥pali̥te], [mynspalte].

Much more common is the nasalization of some long vowels placed before a nasal consonant: même [mɛːm] → [mɛ̃ɪ̯̃m] ~ [mãɪ̯̃m], jeûne [ʒøːn] → [ʒø̃ỹ̯n], jaune [ʒoːn] → [ʒõʊ̯̃n], etc.

Similarly, consonants in clusters are often assimilated, usually with the consonant closer to the stress (the end of the word), which transmits its phonation (or its nasalization): demande [dmãːd] → [nmãːd], chaque jour [ʃak ʒʊu̯ʁ] → [ʃak̬ ʒʊu̯ʁ]. Progressive assimilation also occurs but only for [ʃ] and [s] before [v] and [m]: cheval [ʃval] → [ʃv̥al].

The dropping of /ə/, which is as frequent in Quebec as it is in France (but occurs in different places), creates consonant clusters, which causes assimilation. For instance, the first-person singular pronoun "je" may be devoiced before a verb with a voiceless consonant initial. That occurs most notably with verbs that normally begin with [s], as the well-known example je suis 'I am' is often realized as "chu" ([ʃy]) and je sais 'I know' as "ché" ([ʃe]) or even ([ʃːe]). However, the elision of /ə/ is not exclusive to Quebec, and the phenomenon is also seen in other dialects.

One extreme instance of assimilation in Quebec French is vocalic fusion, which is associated with informal speech and fast speech and consonant elisions. Vocalic fusion can be either total (as in prepositional determiners sur la [sʏʁla] → [sya] → [saː], dans la [dãla] → [dãa] → [dæ̃ː], and dans les [dãle] → [dẽɪ̯̃]) or partial (as in il lui a dit, [ɪllɥiɑd͡zi] → [ɪllɥiɔd͡zi] → [iɥiɔd͡zi] → [ijɔd͡zi] or [iːjɔd͡zi]). Partial fusion can occur also in slow speech.

=== Liaison ===
Liaison is a phenomenon in spoken French in which an otherwise-silent final consonant is pronounced at the beginning of a following word beginning with a vowel. The rules for liaison are complex in both European French and Quebec French.

== Sample passage ==
A young male speaker reads a text with a Quebec City accent.

From Les insolences du Frère Untel (1960), by Jean-Paul Desbiens, p. 27.

Un fruit typique de cette incompétence et de cette irresponsabilité,
[œ̃ fχɥi t͡sipɪk̚ | dœ sɛt‿ẽɪ̃kõʊ̃pɛtãːs | e dœ sɛt͡siʁɛspõʊ̃sabilite | ]
c'est le cours secondaire public.
[se lkʊu̯ʁ̞ | sœ̈ɡõʊ̃daɛ̯ʁ̞ pyblɪk ‖ ]
Tout a été improvisé, de ce côté :
[tu t‿ɑ ete | ẽɪ̃pχɔvɪze | dœ s koːte | ]
les programmes, les manuels, les professeurs.
[lɛ pχɔɡʁam | lɛ manɥɛl | lɛ pχɔfɛsɑœ̯ɹ ‖ ]
L'opinion réclamait un cours secondaire public.
[l‿ʌpʰinjõʊ̃ | ʁeklɑːmɛ̈ ɚ̃ kʊu̯ʁ sœ̈ɡõʊ̃daɛ̯ʁ̞ pyblɪk ‖ ]
On lui a vendu l'étiquette,
[õʊ̃ lɥi | ʌ vãd͡zy | let͡skɛt̚ | ]
mais l'étiquette était collée sur une bouteille vide.
[mɛ let͡skɛt‿ɛtɛ kɔle sʏn butɛj vɪd ‖ ]
Le mal vient non pas de la mauvaise foi,
[lœ̈ mal vjẽɪ̃ nõʊ̃ | pɔ dla mɔvaɛ̯z fwa | ]
mais du manque de lucidité et du porte-à-faux.
[mɛ d͡zy mãŋ | dœ̈ lysid͡zite | e d͡zy pɔʁt‿a fo ‖ ]
Le mal vient de ce qu'on a voulu jouer sur deux tableaux,
[lœ̈ mal vjẽɪ̃ | dœ̈ sœ̈ kõʊ̃ n‿ɑ vuly ʒwe | sʏʁ dø tablo | ]
sans jamais s'avouer qu'on jouait :
[sã ʒamɛ | s‿avwe k‿õʊ̃ ʒwɛ ‖ ]
d'une part, sauver le cours secondaire privé,
[d‿ʏn pɑɔ̯ʁ̞ | soːve lœ̈ kʊu̯ʁ̞ sœ̈ɡõʊ̃daɛ̯ʁ̞ pχive]
considéré en pratique comme la réserve nationale des vocations sacerdotales ;
[kõʊ̃sidɛʁe | ã pχat͡sɪk̚ | kɔm la ʁezɛʁv nasjɔnal | dɛ vɔkasjõʊ̃ sasɛʁdɔtal]
d'autre part, satisfaire l'opinion publique.
[d‿oʊ̯tχœ̈ pɑ̯ɒʁ̞ | sat͡ss̩faɛ̯ʁ̞ | l‿ʌpʰinjõʊ̃ pyblɪk ‖ ]
Le Département s'est occupé efficacement du plan institutionnel
[lœ̈ depaχtœmã | sɛ t‿ɔkype | ɛfikasmã | d͡zy plã ẽɪ̃st͡sit͡sy̥sjɔnɛl | ]
(les collèges classiques privés) ;
[lɛ kɔlaɪ̯ʒ klasɪk pχive | ]
il a escamoté le plan académique (le cours secondaire public).
[il‿a ɛskamɔte | lœ plã akademɪk | lœ̈ kʊu̯ʁ sœɡõʊ̃daɛ̯ʁ̞ pyblɪk ‖ ]
La solution virile, ici, exigeait que l'on distinguât
[la sʌlysjõʊ̃ viʁɪl | isi | ɛɡziʒɛ | kœ̈ lõʊ̃ d͡zɪstẽɪ̃ɡɑ | ]
(voyez-moi cet imparfait du subjonctif, comme il a grand air.
[vwaje mwa | sɛ t‿ẽɪ̃paχfɛ | d͡zy sʏbʒõʊ̃kt͡sɪf | kɔm ɪl ɑ ɡʁã t‿aɛ̯ʁ̞ ‖ ]
Salut, imparfait du subjonctif) une fois pour toutes pour ces deux plans.
[saly | ẽɪ̃paχfɛ d͡zy sʏbʒõʊ̃kt͡sɪf | ʏn fwa pʊχ tʊt | pʊχ sɛ dø˞ː plã ‖ ]

== Bibliography ==
- Ostiguy, Luc; Tousignant, Claude (2008). Les prononciations du français québécois. Montréal: Guérin universitaire. ISBN 9782760169470.

== See also ==
- French orthography
