= Quebec French lexicon =

There are various lexical differences between Quebec French and Metropolitan French in France. These are distributed throughout the registers, from slang to formal usage.

Notwithstanding Acadian French in the Maritime Provinces, Quebec French is the dominant form of French throughout Canada, with only very limited interregional variations. The terms Quebec French and Canadian French are therefore often used interchangeably.

== Standardization ==
The Office québécois de la langue française believes that neither morphology nor syntax should be different between Québécois and Metropolitan French, and even that phonetic differences should be kept to a minimum. However, starting in the 1960s, it agreed to the use of words then called "well-formed Canadianisms (canadianismes de bon aloi)," that either are regional in nature (such as names of plants and animals), have been used since before the Conquest, or are justified in their origin and are considered to be equivalent or "better" than the standard equivalent.

A very small list of words was published in 1969, mainly containing words that were archaic in France, but still common in Quebec. This list especially contained imperial units and words from aboriginal languages. Subsequent lists have been published regularly since then.

Many differences that exist between Quebec French and European French arise from the preservation of certain forms that are today archaic in Europe. New words were also created for Quebec specialties that do not exist in Europe.

As with any two regional variants, there is an abundance of slang terms found in Quebec that are not found in France. Quebec French profanity uses references to Catholic liturgical terminology, rather than the references to prostitution that are more common in France. Many English words and calques have also been integrated in Quebec French, although less than in France. In Quebec, borrowed English words tend to have the same meaning as the English word. In France, they often have a very different meaning; for example le smoking for 'tuxedo'. Borrowing from English is politically sensitive in Quebec and tends to be socially discouraged.

=== Gender-neutral usage ===
Formal Quebec French also has a very different approach to gender-neutral language than Metropolitan French. There is a much greater tendency to generalize feminine markers among nouns referring to professions. This is done in order to avoid having to refer to a woman with a masculine noun, and thereby seeming to suggest that a particular profession is primarily masculine. Forms that would be seen as highly unusual in France are commonplace in Quebec, such as la docteure, la professeure, la première ministre, la gouverneure générale, and so forth. Many of these have been formally recommended by the Office québécois de la langue française and adopted by society at large. Official government and state titles and designations always have official, mandated French equivalent terms for each gender.

Also, rather than following the rule that the masculine includes the feminine, it is relatively common to create doublets, especially in polemical speech: Québécoises et Québécois, tous et toutes, citoyens et citoyennes.

As an isolated anecdote, a Quebec labour union once decided to promulgate an epicene neologism on the model of fidèle, calling itself the Fédération des professionnèles, rather than use either professionnels (masculine only) or professionnels et professionnelles (masculine and feminine). This sparked a fair amount of debate and is rather on the outer edge of techniques for nonsexist writing in Quebec French.

In 2025, the Quebec minister for French language announced that the provincial government and municipal governments would be directed to cease using gender-inclusive suffixes, alternatives, and doublets in official communications.

=== Morphology (word formation) ===
Some suffixes are more productive in Quebec than in France, in particular the adjectival suffix -eux, which has a somewhat pejorative meaning: téter → téteux ('thick, dumb, nitpicking, nerd'), niaiser → niaiseux ('foolish, irritating'); obstiner → ostineux ('stubborn'); pot → poteux ('a user or dealer of marijuana'). This originates in the Norman language.

The adjectival suffix -euse is added to verbal stems to form "the machine that verbs." For example, laver → laveuse 'washing machine'; balayer → balayeuse 'vacuum cleaner' (but 'streetsweeper' in France). In France 'vacuum cleaner' is aspirateur.

Quebec French	English	Metropolitan French	Note
abatis	assart	essart	
achigan	black bass	perche noire	
acre	acre	arpent	In Louisiana, an arpent is still a legal unit of measurement, and is not the same as an acre. Here, arpent is used both as a measure of length as well as area. Land was traditionally surveyed to either 40 or 80 arpents back from a river or bayou (1.5 or 3 miles). For measuring area, a square (English) mile contains 640 acres, but 512 arpents.
pinotte/arachide	peanut	cacahuète	
atoca/canneberge	cranberry	airelle/canneberge	In Quebec, canneberge usually denotes the fruit itself as well as the cranberry juice, whereas atoca usually refers to the cranberry jelly traditionally eaten with the Thanksgiving or Christmas turkey. In France airelle is also used for lingonberry; shops selling cranberries imported from Canada increasingly label them canneberge.
avionnerie	aircraft manufacturing plant	usine de fabrication d'avions	
banc de neige	snow bank	congère	
barrer	to lock	verrouiller	French colonists would use a crossbar to secure the entrance to their dwelling. Hence, barring rather than locking the door.
débarrer	to unlock	déverrouiller	
bebitte/bibitte	bug	moustique/insecte/bestiole/bêbette	In France, the term bitte refers to a man's phallus. Bitte is not used in Quebec, though French terms such as this are recognized more and more. The younger Québécois generation can often use their own native terms and French terms alternately. The French on the other hand are more rarely exposed to Quebec French and so are less "accepting" of such deviations.
bicycle/velo	bicycle	vélo	
bleuets [sauvages]	lowbush/wild blueberries	myrtilles / airelle à feuilles étroites	See Quebec specialities section
bleuetière	blueberry field or farm	champ de myrtilles	
bordages			Ice stuck to the bank of a river. Often used to designate the slushy mix of ice and snow pushed to the side of the road by snow plows.
bouscueil			Jostling of ice under the effect of winds, tides, or streams
brûlot	noseeums	nez	A type of cranefly / tiny fly that causes a burning sensation when it bites, thus the name.
brunante	nightfall/dusk	crépuscule	
cabane à sucre	sugar shack	cabane à sucre	
cacaoui	long-tailed duck	harelde boréale	A type of wild duck
carcajou	wolverine (Am.), glutton (Br.)	glouton	
ceinture fléchée	Assumption sash	Châssis de l'Assomption	
chopine	pint	pinte	Pinte is used in Canada, but refers to a quart
coureur de(s) bois / bûcheron	backwoodsman, fur trader, lumberjack	bûcheron, commerçant de fourrures	
débarbouillette	facecloth	gant de toilette (glove)	
demi	half-pint	demi	
dépanneur	convenience store/corner store	épicerie/supérette	A small store serving the local community. Many are open 24/7 and have a gas station attached to them.
doré	walleye / blue pike perch / sauger	doré / sandre bleu / poirier	
épluchette / épluchette de blé d'inde	corn roast	rôti de maïs	Designates a social gathering where people husk and eat corn / 'To husk' - éplucher
érablière	maple grove	érablière	
fin de semaine	weekend	week-end	
stationnement/parking	parking lot (Am.), car park (Br.)	parking	The word stationnement is the French word, but in France many words are replaced with the English equivalent when it is shorter.
frasil	fragile ice	glace fragile	
huard (huart)	Common loon	Plongeon huard	A type of bird typically found in lakes and ponds. In Canada, this bird is found on one dollar coins and is alternatively used to designate one dollar coins.
magasinage/magasiner	shopping, to go shopping	courses/faire des courses/faire les magasins	The word for 'shop' or 'store' in all varieties of French is le magasin. In Quebec, the verb magasiner is used for 'shopping', and was naturally created by simply converting the noun. In France, the expression is either faire des courses, faire des achats, faire des emplettes, or faire du shopping. No single verb exists as does in Quebec.
maringouin/moustique	mosquito	moustique	
millage/kilométrage	mileage	kilométrage	
orignal	moose (Am.), elk (Br.)	élan	The word moose is also used in Britain by many.
ouananiche	freshwater salmon	saumon atlantique d'eau douce	
ouaouaron	bullfrog	grenouille-taureau	
outarde	Canada goose	bernache du Canada	
poudrerie / rafale de (neige)	blowing snow	rafale de (neige) poudreuse	
pruche	Eastern hemlock	tsuga du Canada	
raquetteur	snowshoer	celui qui fait des raquettes	
souffleuse	snowblower	chasse-neige	In Quebec, un chasse-neige is a snowplow, though the term charrue is mainly used for 'snowplow'.
suisse	eastern chipmunk	tamia rayé	Also sometimes called petit suisse 'tiny chipmunk' because when compared, it is smaller than a squirrel.
télézard	a couch potato	patate de sofa	from télé + lézarder
tire d'érable	maple taffy	tire d'érable	
traversier	ferryboat	ferry/bac	
tuque	tuque	bonnet	
tuxedo	tuxedo (Am.), dinner jacket (Br.)	smoking	In Quebec, the word tuxedo is used to describe a dinner or evening jacket distinguished primarily by satin or grosgrain facings on the jacket's lapels and buttons and a similar stripe along the outseam of the trousers. The word smoking is generally used to refer to a tuxedo in France.
verge/cour	yard	As in cour arrière, literally 'backyard'	
vivoir	living room	salon / (salle de) séjour	

== Preservation of forms ==
Many differences that exist between Quebec French and Metropolitan French arise from the preservation of certain forms that are today archaic in Europe. For example, espérer for 'to wait' (attendre in France).

Cour in Quebec is a backyard (jardin in French), whereas in France cour has dropped this meaning and primarily refers to a courtyard (as well as other meanings like 'court'). However, in some areas of France, such as in the mining regions of northern France, cour still means 'backyard'.

The word breuvage is used for '[a] drink' in addition to boisson; this is an old French usage (bevrage) from which the English beverage originates. Breuvage may be used in European French, but generally indicates some nuance, possibly pejorative.

The word piastre or piasse, a slang term for a dollar (equivalent to buck in English), was in fact the term originally used in French for the American or Spanish dollar (they had the same value for a long period).

The word couple is used in standard French as a masculine noun ('a couple', married or unmarried), but in Quebec it is also used as a feminine noun in phrases like une couple de semaines (a couple of weeks). This is often thought to be an anglicism, but is in fact a preservation of an archaic French usage.

It is quite common in Quebec French to describe something positive using litotes, such as pas laid ('not ugly') for 'beautiful' or pas pire ('not worst') for 'good' when standard French would suggest using the positive equivalent instead. However, Metropolitan French has its own commonly used litotes: pas bête or pas con ('smart'); pas mal ('fine'); pas dégueu(lasse) ('tasty'); and pas top, pas super or pas génial ('bad').

=== Prepositions ===
The preposition à is often used in possessive contexts, whereas standard French uses de; le char à Pierre ('Pierre's car') instead of la voiture de Pierre. This is also found in the informal French of France, such as Hier j'ai vu la copine à Bruno ('Yesterday I saw Bruno's girlfriend').

In a number of cases, Quebec speakers prefer to use the preposition à instead of using a non-prepositional phrase with ce 'this'; for example à matin or à soir instead of ce matin and ce soir ('this morning' and 'this evening'). Note also à cette heure, pronounced and sometimes spelt asteure or astheure (literally 'at this time') for maintenant 'now' and désormais 'henceforth', which is also found in Queneau. These usages of à are considered colloquial.

== Nautical terms ==
A number of terms that in other French-speaking regions are exclusively nautical are used in wider contexts in Quebec. This is often attributed to the original arrival of French immigrants by ship, and to the dominance of the Saint Lawrence River as the principal means of transport among the major settlements of the region in the past centuries. An example is the word débarquer, which in Quebec means to get off any conveyance (a car, a train); in France, this word means only to disembark from a ship or aircraft (descendre from other vehicles), plus some colloquial uses. Another example would be vadrouille for 'mop' (in French it would mean 'wandering', or a mop made of ropes and used on a ship. A regular house mop would be called serpillère).

== Political terms ==
Since Canada uses the Westminster system, unlike republican France, many political terms devised in English have had to be imported or new terms created. This is can lead to awkward constructions, the most famous example being Dominion, for which there is no French translation. In Canadian English, the first minister of the federation is called the Prime Minister and the first minister of a province is called a Premier. However, Quebec French makes no distinction and both are called Premier ministre in all cases. An electoral district in Canada is called a riding in anglophone Canada but a comté in Quebec.

== Quebec specialties ==
There are also words for Quebec specialties that do not exist in Europe, for example poutine, CEGEP, tuque (a Canadianism in both official languages), and dépanneur ('a corner store, small grocery'; dépanneur in France is a mechanic who comes in to repair a car or a household appliance, which is called a dépanneuse in Quebec).

Blueberries, abundant in the Saguenay-Lac-Saint-Jean, are called bleuets; in France, they are lumped together with myrtilles (bilberries) and bleuet refers to cornflower. (Bleuet is also slang for someone from Saguenay-Lac-Saint-Jean.) Although very similar, these are not the same plants (i.e. myrtilles are Vaccinium myrtillus and bleuets are Vaccinium angustifolium or corymbosum).

== Informality ==
French speakers of Quebec use the informal second-person pronoun tu more often and in more contexts than speakers in France do. In certain contexts it may be perfectly appropriate to address a stranger or even the customer of a store using tu, whereas the latter would be considered impolite in France. The split often runs across generations in Quebec: People between 40 and 60 years of age often feel that sales people, or service personnel giving them a tu instead of a vous are uncouth or uncultivated. People 60 years of age and older will sometimes feel insulted if a stranger uses the tu to them. Government employees (such as policemen or bureaucrats with some contact with the public) as well as employees of large stores or large chains in Quebec are usually instructed to use vous with everybody, unless some kind of camaraderie is in play or they know the person well. Sometimes the split is also across social or educational lines. For instance, young academics are usually hesitant in using tu with slightly older colleagues who have just a few more years of seniority.

A similar distinction in English, where, since the second person singular thou went out of use 200 years ago, might be whether to address or respond to someone on a first-name basis. For example, one might say to a man that one has just met, "Thank you, Mr. Gibson"—equivalent to using vous. If Mr Gibson wants to maintain formality, that is, similar to using vous, he might say, "You're welcome", and if he wants to be more relaxed and familiar, he would add, "Please call me Jim". This gives Anglophones an inkling of the use of tu in Canadian French.

Metropolitan French public speakers such as politicians occasionally come across as stuffy or snobbish to certain Quebec Francophones. There is also a certain impression among the Quebec population (men especially) that Metropolitan French is quite effeminate—though this is not often directly discussed. This may explain why even better educated Québécois rarely try to emulate the Metropolitan French accent, though many probably could do so with relative ease. This is also true for people from southern France. Visitors from southern France who move temporarily to Paris and pick up the local Parisian accent may be derided by their friends who have remained in the south. This is all similar to the perception North American English-speakers may have of British English as "uppity" or "fancy".

== Idioms ==
There is a huge variety of idioms in Quebec that do not exist in France, such as fait que 'so'; en masse 'a lot'; s'en venir (for arriver and venir ici); ben là! or voyons donc! 'oh, come on!', de même (for comme ça).

Reference books have been written about idioms specific to Quebec. Some examples include:

- J'ai mon voyage = J'en ai marre/Pas possible! 'I'm fed up/Unbelievable!'
- C'est de valeur = C'est dommage 'What a pity'
- Habillé comme la chienne à Jacques 'dressed up like a dog's dinner'
- C'est malade/fou raide 'That's sick/crazy/rad'
- Se faire avoir 'to get fooled'
- Mais que = lorsque, quand que 'When...' (the subjunctive must follow this form)
- Tirer le diable par la queue = Avoir les difficultés avec l'argent 'I'm in a tight spot financially'
- Se faire passer un sapin 'to be lied to'
- Avoir une face à claque 'a bad person'
- Avoir les yeux dans la graisse de bines 'to be in love, to be tired (glassy-eyed)'
- Avoir l'estomac dans les talons 'to be extremely hungry'
- Être né pour un petit pain 'one who does not have many opportunities', usually used in the negative form.
- Il fait frette 'It is cold'
- Chanter la pomme 'to flirt'
- Se pogner le cul 'to sit and do nothing all day'
- Je m'en sacre 'I do not give a damn'

Dialogue in sitcoms on Quebec television often uses such idioms extensively, which can make certain dialogues rather incomprehensible to French speakers of Europe. Most speakers will use various contractions, omitting certain articles or even changing the pronunciation of certain words, which can be daunting for inexperienced speakers.

== Slang terms ==
As with any two regional variants, there is an abundance of slang terms found in Quebec that are not found in France. Quebec French profanity uses references to Catholic liturgical equipment, rather than the references to prostitution that are more common in France.

The expression 'you're welcome' is bienvenue or ça me fait plaisir in Quebec, though de rien or y'a pas de quoi is also used in Quebec. Note that the expression bonne journée (as opposed to bonjour) is also often used for 'goodbye' in Quebec (similar to good day), which it is not in France (where it is more common to say au revoir or bye).

Some slang terms unique to Quebec:

Québécois	English	Notes
ben	very	Used informally for 'Well...', on both sides. Ben, tu te souviens de cette encyclopédie sur Internet?. It is derived from the formal form eh bien.
bibitte	small insect	Derived from bébête for 'small creature'
blonde	girlfriend	May be used regardless of hair colour
bobette(s)	underwear, specifically panties	In Europe, sous-vêtements
brailler	to weep, to whine	In Europe, to scream, to speak very loudly (colloquial)
char	car	Comes from cart and horse days. In Europe, a char is an army tank or a chariot.
crosser	to masturbate; to double-cross, to deceive	Verb is 'to masturbate' in reflexive form only. Crosseur 'wanker, swindler'. In Europe, the French say (se) branler
crier	to obtain	In Europe, 'to cry'. See also pogner
déguidine!	stop procrastinating, get on with it, hurry up	The second "d" is pronounced "dz". See also déniaise!, envoye!, enweye!, awaye!
écœurant	wonderful (used ironically)	Literally 'nauseating', used ironically to mean something is overwhelmingly good, as an English speaker might say "so sweet I got a tooth ache". Someone calling another person mon écœurant 'you bastard!' is not a term of endearment.
envoye! (enweye)(awaye)	let's go, hurry up, come on	Often pronounced with a "w" sound, not with "v"
faque	that said, so, that means	Contraction of fait que or ça fait que. Also, in Europe ce qui fait que...
fif	homosexual	fam. Osti quié fif ce gars la. ('Damn, he's gay, that guy there'). European French = PD/pédé
fin, fine	nice, sweet (of a person)	In Europe mignon, mignonne
flo	a kid (perhaps 10 years old or so)	Might possibly be an anglicism from fellow. European French môme/gosses/les drôles
fret(te)	cold	Denotes something colder than merely ça caille !/Il fait froid
le fun	fun, amusing (adjective, not noun, despite the le)	c'est très le fun; c'est amusant
gale, galle	scab	Possibly related to the disease
garrocher	to throw without caution, fling carelessly	Pronounced garrocher or goarrocher
genre	like	This slang is used as a parallel to the word like used in some American slang; the French word for 'like', comme, may also be used. These words appear often in the same sentence as the word tsé (tu sais 'you know') as a form of slipped words within spoken structure. The use of voilà in this manner, although common in France, is not found in Canada.
gollé	trench, ditch	From English gully
graine	cock, penis	Eille le gros, on voit ta graine!—European French bitte, queue
grouiller	hurry up, move	This verb is often used in grouille-toé, meaning 'hurry up'. Also used to mean 'you move' as in grouille pas (ne bouge pas), meaning 'don't move'. It is used in the same way in Europe: grouille-toi, grouille tes puces (literally 'shake your fleas')
guidoune	prostitute, badly dressed woman, effeminate man	
jaser	to chat	
lutter	hit with a car	Can be used as follows: J'ai lutté un orignal 'I hit a moose'. Lutter in proper French means 'to wrestle'.
magané	deteriorated, used, wrecked	Can also mean tired, sick or exhausted.
mets-en	totally, for sure, I'll say	Used to agree with a statement (informal)
pantoute	not at all	Contraction of pas en tout (pas du tout)
paqueté/saoul	drunk	
pitoune	babe, chick (good looking girl); or floating log	Depends on the context, from Occitan pichona [pi'tʃuno] 'young girl'
plate	boring, unfortunate	plat 'flat' with the t pronounced
pleumer	having peeling skin after sun exposure; to vomit, sometimes also used instead of plumer	J'ai un coup de soleil, je pleume. 'I have a sunburn, my skin is peeling.' To vomit when having nausea; J'ai trop bu hier, j'ai pleumé partout 'I drank too much yesterday, I barfed everywhere'
plotte	vagina or promiscuous woman	Very vulgar, similar to the English cunt
plumer	To pluck (literally, as plume means 'feather').	Secondly, it can be used as a verb to describe a beating in a game; Je vais te plumer aux cartes in the sense of plucking the feathers of an opponent; similar to the English expression "to lose one's shirt". Finally, as a verb meaning 'to peel', as in J'ai plumé quelques légumes 'I peeled some veggies'.
poche	bad, untalented	Can also mean 'unfortunate' (c'est poche ça, similar to c'est plate ça)
pogner	get, grab	Can also mean to be sexually attractive, successful, or to have a loud argument with someone (J'me suis pogné avec mon voisin, 'I bickered with my neighbour'). It may also mean 'obtain', as in Je me suis pogné une nouvelle radio 'I grabbed myself a new radio'.
quétaine	kitsch, tacky (not in a good way)	
taper, tomber sur les nerfs	to irritate someone, 'get on one's nerves'	Only taper sur les nerfs in France.
tête(s) carrée(s)	English-Canadians	Used only in Quebec, this term can be considered pejorative or even a racial slur. Literally "square head(s)" in English.
toé (toi)	you (informal)	
tsé (tu sais)	you know	Used in the same way the French use vous savez and corresponds to the English version "you know" or the American version "y'know" (abbreviated structure). Often heard in the same sentence as the word genre, as both are slang representing lack of clarity.
se tasser	move over	Europe: s'entasser 'to be jammed in together'. Ça se tasse, a situation where tempers settle down after a scandal or quarrel
v'nir	to come	In Quebec check les ben v'nir! In Europe, regarde le bien s'en venir

== Words from aboriginal languages ==
Word	Meaning
achigan	black bass
atoca	cranberry
boucane old term of boucan 'meat smoker' also root of buccaneer	smoke
carcajou	wolverine
manitou	important individual
maskinongé	muskellunge (muskie) (Esox masquinongy), largest member of the freshwater pike family
micouène	large wooden spoon
mocassin	moccasin
ouananiche	land-locked variety of salmon

== Use of anglicisms ==
Loanwords from English, as well as calques or loans of syntactic structures, are known as anglicisms (French: anglicismes).

=== Colloquial and slang registers ===
The use of anglicisms in colloquial and Quebec French slang is commonplace, but varies from a place to another, depending on the English presence in the area. These words cannot be used in official documents or in academic writing, etc. Some examples of long-standing anglicisms include:

Anglicism	Meaning	English word (cognate)
anyway	anyway, nevertheless	
all-dressed	with all the toppings [pizza, etc.]	
bécosse	outhouse, washroom	backhouse
bines	pork and beans	beans
blood	(adj.) nice, generous [of a person]	
chum	male friend; boyfriend [chum de fille 'female friend', blonde 'girlfriend']	chum
checker	to check	check
chiffe/chiffre	a shift [work period at factory, etc.]	shift
chouclaques	running shoes	
cruiser	make a pass at	cruise
cute	cute (good-looking)	
domper	to dump (a boyfriend or girlfriend)	dump
faker	to simulate, pretend (e.g., orgasm)	fake
fan	a fan (of a band, a sports team), a ceiling fan	
filer	to feel [guilty, etc.]; when unmodified, to feel good; negated, to feel bad (j'file pas astheure)	feel
flusher	to flush (toilet); get rid of; dump [boyfriend/girlfriend]	flush
flyé	extravagant, far out, over the top	fly
frencher	to French kiss	French
full	very much (je l'aime full), full (Le réservoir est full)	
game	game, sports match or, used as an adjective, meaning having the courage to do something; Je suis game.	
good	good! [expressing approval; not as an adjective]	
hot	hot (excellent, attractive)	
hot-chicken	hot chicken sandwich	hot chicken
lousse	loose, untied, released	loose
moppe	mop	mop
pantré	the pantry or food cupboard; mets-ça s'a pantré	pantry
pâte à dents	toothpaste	calque of toothpaste
peanut	Peanut or something of little value (Travailler pour des peanuts, 'Work for peanuts') While the spelling pinotte is valid, it is seldomly used, especially in formal contexts. The alternate spelling peanut is more widespread throughout Quebec, including cities like Victoriaville.	
pitcher	to throw, to pitch	to pitch
pogner le ditch	to go in the ditch with one's car	
party	party, social gathering	
scramme	scram! get lost!	
scrapper	scrap, ruin, break, destroy, nullify	scrap
signe	a sink	
slacker	to slacken, loosen; slack off, take it easy; fire [employee]	slack
smatte	smart; wise-guy (either good or bad, as in "smart ass"); likeable [person]; cool;	smart
smoke meat	Montreal smoked meat (similar to pastrami)	smoked meat
swomp	swamp, bog	swamp
toast	Can be used as the verb for toasting (Toast mes tranches de pain or Tu as bien trop fait toasté mon pain). Québécois can also use the word toaster instead of grille-pain for the appliance.	toast
tof	difficult, rough	tough
toffer	withstand, endure	tough it out
toune	song	tune
whatever	(indicating dismissal)	whatever

It is also very commonplace for an English word to be used as a nonce word, for example when the speaker temporarily cannot remember the French word. This is particularly common with technical words. Since decades passed before technical documentation began to be printed in French in Quebec, an English word might be the most common way for a French-speaking mechanic or other technical worker to refer to the mechanisms he or she had to deal with. It is often difficult or impossible to distinguish between such a nonce anglicism and an English word quoted as such for effect.

One such example is the rural Quebec pronunciation of North American car parts that are commonly used. Their pronunciation sometimes varies significantly and may even be found in written form as wipeurs, winnecheer, houde, top, galipeur, tchok, naqueule, gasquette, shaffe, cameshaft, sille de crinque, taillerode or térodenne.

There are some anglicisms that have no obvious connection to any currently existing modern Canadian English idiom. For example, être sur le party (lit. 'to be on the party', 'to be partying, to be in the mood for a party'). Idioms like foquer le chien ('to screw the pooch') are even used.

=== Standard register ===
A number of Quebecisms used in the standard register are also derived from English forms, especially as calques, such as prendre une marche (from take a walk, in France, se promener, also used in Quebec) and banc de neige (from English snowbank; in France, congère, a form unknown in Quebec.) However, in standard and formal registers, there is a much stronger tendency to avoid English borrowings in Quebec than in France.

As a result, especially with regard to in modern items, Quebec French often contains forms designed to be more "French" than an English borrowing that may be used anyway in European French, like fin de semaine, which is week-end in France, or courriel (from courrier électronique) for France's mail or mel.

Some are calques into French of English phrases that Continental French borrowed directly, such as un chien chaud for European French hot dog. In Quebec, the spelling gai to mean 'homosexual' is standard. In France, gai has kept the original meaning of 'happy, cheerful' while gay is used to mean 'homosexual', but specifically in reference to gay American subculture and by those usually over 35 who identify as gay. Gay men in France 35 and under usually label themselves as homo, not gay.

Although many (not all) of these forms were promulgated by the Office québécois de la langue française (OQLF) of Quebec, they have been accepted into everyday use. Indeed, the French government has since adopted the word courriel (in 2003). The term has been gaining acceptance as it is now used in respected newspapers such as Libération.

=== Jargon and slang ===
Social groups, tied together by either a profession or an interest, may use part or all of the corresponding English jargon or slang in their domains, instead of that used in other French-speaking countries. English terms are, for example, very widely used in typically male jobs like engineering (notably mechanical engineering), carpentry, and computer programming. This situation was caused historically by a lack of properly translated technical manuals and documentation.

Recent translation efforts in targeted domains such as the automotive industry and environmental engineering are yielding some results. The most English-ridden Quebec slang is used among members of the gamer community, who are also for the most part Millennials and frequent computer users. In these circles, computer gaming slang is used as well as an enormous number of normal terms commonly found in computer applications and games (save, map, level, etc.).

=== Perception ===
The perceived overuse of anglicisms in the colloquial register is one cause of the stigmatization of Quebec French. Both the Québécois and the European French accuse each other (and themselves) of using too many anglicisms. A running joke of the difference between European French and Quebec French is that in Europe, on se gare dans un parking 'one parks in a carpark' and in Quebec, on se parque dans un stationnement 'one parks in a parking lot'.

Quebec and France tend to have entirely different anglicisms because in Quebec they are the gradual result of two and a half centuries of living with English-speaking neighbors, whereas in Europe anglicisms are much more recent and the result of the increasing international dominance of American English.

== Other differences ==
Like most global languages there are regional differences. Even within Quebec there are regional uses of words or expression. Here are some other differences between standard Quebec French and France French:

Quebec term	Translation	Meaning of term in Europe	France term	Note
char (pronounced [ʃɑɔ̯ʁ])	car	tank (military assault vehicle)	voiture	
abreuvoir (pronounced [abʁœvwɑːʁ] or [abʁœvwɒːʁ])	water fountain	watering place for animals	fontaine	Used only for animals in Europe (or for comical effect)
achalandage (pronounced [aʃalãdaːʒ])	traffic (of a store, street, public transit)	stock, merchandise, clientele (archaic)	circulation, embouteillage, bouchon	
arrêt	a stop or command to stop		arrêt	Used on stop signs in Quebec only
aubaine	sale	opportunity	promotion	An item is une aubaine but en promotion
baccalauréat (pronounced [bakalɔʁeɑ], [bakalɔʁeɒ] or [bakalɔʁeɔ])	bachelor's degree	high school leaving exam or diploma	baccalauréat	
barrer (pronounced [bɑʁe] or [bɒʁe])	to lock	to block or to strike through	fermer à clé, verrouiller	Quebec usage archaic in Europe
bête (pronounced [bɛɪ̯t], [beɪ̯t], [bæɪ̯t] or [baɪ̯t])	disagreeable (person)	stupid	désagréable, impoli	European usage also used in Quebec
blé d'Inde (pronounced [ble d‿ẽɪ̯̃d])	corn (North American usage)		maïs	Maïs also standard in Quebec when referring to the corn, such as mais éclatée (or soufflée) 'popped corn'. Blé d'Inde is always used to refer to the whole stalk, as in corn on the cob.
brosse	drinking binge	brush	cuite	
cartable	vinder	school bag, satchel	classeur	See also classeur
cédule	schedule	tax bracket (archaic)	emploi du temps/agenda	
chandail (pronounced [ʃãdaj])	t-shirt, sweater, sweatshirt	knit sweater	pull-over/T-shirt	
choquer	to anger	to shock	fâcher	
classeur (pronounced [klɑː.sɶːʁ], [klɑː.saœ̯ʁ] or [klɒː.saœ̯ʁ])	filing cabinet	binder	armoire à dossier	See also cartable
correct (pronounced [kɔʁɛkt] or [kɔʁɛk])	good, sufficient, kind, O.K.	corrected	bon, juste	
coupe glacée	ice cream sundae		coupe de glace de la glace au chocolat/à la fraise, etc.	An ice cream stand is known as a bar laitier or crèmerie (in France, a glacier)
croche	crooked; strange, dishonest	eighth note	curieux/bizarre/étrange	
crème glacée	ice cream		de la glace	An ice cream stand is known as a bar laitier or crèmerie (in France, a glacier)
débarbouillette	dishrag, washcloth, (glove)		gant de toilette	
débarquer	get out of (a car, etc.)	disembark (from a boat)	descendre	
débrouiller	to figure things out by oneself, to get out of a jam	to clear up, as in one's thoughts (from brouillard, 'fog')		
déjeuner	breakfast	lunch	petit déjeuner	See also dîner, souper. Quebec usage is the same as in Belgium, Switzerland and Occitania (Occitan dejunar [dedʒu'na]).
déniaiser (pronounced [denjɛɪ̯ze])	to get one's act together, to loosen up sexually			
dîner (pronounced [d͡zine])	lunch	dinner	déjeuner	Quebec usage is the same as in Belgium, Switzerland, and Occitania (Occitan dinnar [dinˈna]). Dîner as 'dinner/evening meal' is standard in formal settings and upscale milieux, such as business, military, diplomatic circles, society dinner party, or an upscale restaurant. In Quebec, the evening meal is le souper.
efface	eraser		gomme	Gomme is used for chewing gum
épais (male) (pronounced [epɛ]), épaisse (female) (pronounced [epɛɪ̯s], [epeɪ̯s], [epæɪ̯s] or [epaɪ̯s])	dumb, slow-witted	thick	con (male), conne (female)	Con is also in usage in Quebec with the same meaning.
espadrilles (pronounced [ɛspʁ̥adʁɪj])	running shoes	rope-soled sandal	baskets/tennis/chaussures de sport	
être plein (pronounced [ɛɪ̯t pʰlẽɪ̯̃], [eɪ̯t pʰlẽɪ̯̃], [æɪ̯t pʰlẽɪ̯̃] or [aɪ̯t pʰlẽɪ̯̃])	to be full (from eating)	pleine 'to be pregnant'; 'to be drunk'	être bourré / avoir trop mangé	
familiale	station wagon	estate car	break (voiture)	
fesser	to hit	to spank	frapper	
fête (pronounced [fɛɪ̯t], [feɪ̯t], [fæɪ̯t] or [faɪ̯t])	birthday	saint's day	anniversaire	
football (pronounced [fʊtbɒɫ] or [fʊtbɑʊ̯l])	gridiron football	association football	football canadien / football américain	this usage of football to mean the local code or its closely related U.S. cousin is so uniform throughout Canada that the governing body for association football in Quebec is officially the Fédération de soccer du Québec.
innocent (pronounced [inɔsã] or [inɔsæ̃])	stupid [person]	innocent, naive	imbécile	
insignifiant (pronounced [ẽɪ̯̃siɲifjã] or [ẽɪ̯̃siɲifjæ̃])	stupid [person]	insignificant, unremarkable	imbécile	
linge (pronounced [lẽɪ̯̃ʒ])	clothes	linen	vêtements	
liqueur (pronounced [likɶːʁ] or [likaœ̯ʁ])	soft drink	liquor, liqueur	soda	
magasiner	to go shopping		faire des courses, faire les magasins, du lèche-vitrine (fam.)	
maringouin (pronounced [maʁẽɪ̯̃ɡwẽɪ̯̃] or [maʁẽɪ̯̃ɡwãɪ̯̃])	mosquito		moustique	
mouiller	to rain	to wet	pleuvoir	
niaiser (pronounced [njɛɪ̯ze])	annoy, tease, kid, act up	(does not exist as a verb; niais 'stupid')	se moquer or (hum) dire des niaiseries	Déniaiser (Eu) is 'to make a man lose his virginity'. J'avais juste vingt ans et je me déniaisais / Au bordel ambulant d'une armée en campagne (Brel)
niaiseux (male) (pronounced [njɛɪ̯zø] or [njɛɪ̯zø˞]), niaiseuse (female) (pronounced [njɛɪ̯zøʏ̯z])	an idiot, a fool, an annoying and childish person		niais 'stupid, simpleton'	Can also be used to describe a thing: C'est donc ben niaiseux ce film là! 'this movie is really dumb!').
niaiserie (pronounced [njɛɪ̯zʁi]), niaisage (pronounced [njɛɪ̯zaːʒ])	something that is dumb, childish, frivolous and a waste of time		connerie	Usually used to describe things that a niaiseux does
patate	potato	informal word for 'potato' except when referring to the sweet potato (patate douce)	pomme de terre (pronounced [pɔm dœ̈ tæːʁ] or [pɔm dœ̈ taɛ̯ʁ])	Tu es dans les patates!, told to someone who acts out of, or makes a statement while being unaware of what is going on. Europe: Être à côté de la plaque
peser sur (pronounced [pœ̈ze] or [pɛɪ̯ze])	press (a button)	weigh	appuyer, enfoncer	
la plaque (d'immatriculation)	license plate	license plate	les plaques (mineralogiques)	The French license plate codes are based on a system developed by the mining authorities; Quebec requires only a rear plate on cars and pickup trucks. (les plaques d'immatriculation is used on both sides, especially when speaking of vehicles registered in Switzerland, Ontario, Belgium, or the Maritimes)
poudrerie	blizzard, blowing snow	gunpowder factory	blizzard, tempête de neige, rafales de (neige) poudreuse	
rentrer (pronounced [ʁãtʁe])	enter	re-enter	entrer	In Quebec, 're-enter' is rerentrer. Colloquial French also uses rentrer and rerentrer with the same meanings as in Quebec.
sans-cœur (pronounced [sãkɶːʁ] or [sãkaœ̯ʁ])	mean	heartless	méchant	
soccer (pronounced [sɔkɶːʁ], [sɔkaœ̯ʁ], [sɒkɚ])	association football	Originally British slang for association football (see Oxford "-er"), but now generally considered an Americanism in most of Europe (however, in Ireland, soccer is the most common term for this sport)	foot, football	See note on football above.
souper	supper	late-night dinner	dîner	Quebec usage same as in Belgium, Switzerland and Occitania (Occitan sopar [su'pa]). See also déjeuner, dîner. In formal and upscale settings, the international practice is followed i.e. dîner is the evening meal while souper is a late-night, informal meal.
suçon (pronounced [sysõʊ̯̃])	lollipop	love bite	sucette	And vice versa: a sucette is a love bite or fellatio in Quebec.
téléroman (pronounced [teleʁɔmã] or [teleʁɔmæ̃])	soap opera	a soap opera or a continuing series	feuilleton	
thé glacé	iced tea		ice tea	
touché (gridiron football)	touchdown	Not used in this sense in Europe. (In all forms of French, the word is used as the past participle of toucher 'touch', as well as a fencing term.)	touchdown	See Touchdown Atlantic for an example of the use of touché in reference to Canadian football.
valise	trunk of a car	suitcase (also in Quebec)	coffre	
vidanges (pronounced [vidãːʒ])	garbage	act of emptying	ordures	Vidange in France refers to an automotive oil change, and also an empty bottle in Belgium

Many, but not all, of the European equivalents for the words listed above are also used or at least understood in Quebec.

== See also ==
- Official Quebec dictionary (Grand dictionnaire terminologique multilingue by the Office québécois de la langue française)
- Quebec French profanity
