= Association québécoise de linguistique =

The Association québécoise de linguistique (AQL - Quebec Linguistic Society) is an academic organization devoted to the scientific study of human language, and is a professional society for Francophone linguistic researchers in North America and beyond.

The AQL was formed in 1981. The first executive was formed by Normand Beauchemin as president, Henri Wittmann as vice-president, and Robert Fournier as secretary-general.

== Journal ==
Revue québécoise de linguistique théorique et appliquée
- Discipline: Linguistics
- Language: French
- Edited by: Henri Wittmann

Publication details
- History: 1981–present
- Publisher: Presses universitaires de Trois-Rivières (Canada)
- Frequency: Annual

Standard abbreviations
- ISO 4: Rev. Qué. Linguist. Théor. Appl.

Indexing
- ISSN: 0835-3581

The official journal of the AQL is the Revue québécoise de linguistique théorique et appliquée (RQLTA), an academic journal which publishes peer-reviewed articles reporting research in all the major subdisciplines of linguistics, as well as book reviews and a variety of other communications. The first editor of the journal was Henri Wittmann, under whose editorship, which extended over almost twenty years, the journal published some of the major research results on Quebec French. RQLTA is the only North-American research journal in linguistics that publishes its articles exclusively in French.

== Annual conference ==
The AQL holds an annual linguistics conference every year on alternating campuses throughout Quebec and French Canada, usually in conjunction with ACFAS.

== See also ==
- Canadian French
