= Quebec French profanity =

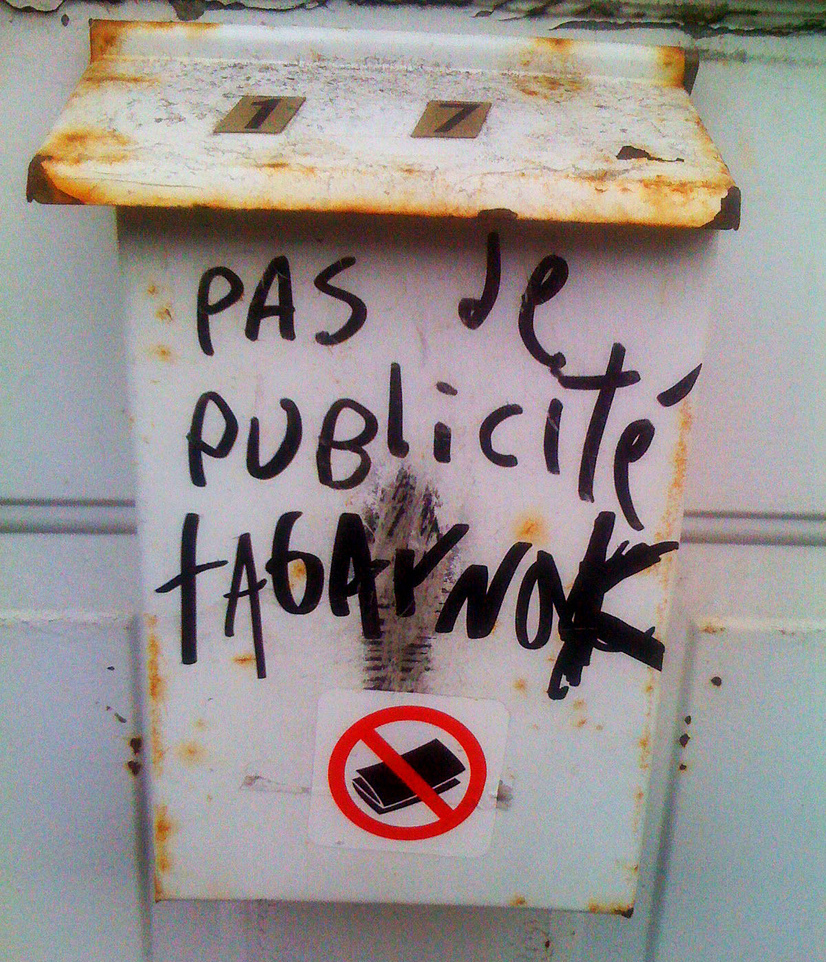
Mailbox sign using French-Canadian profanity. The closest English translation of sentiment and severity is "No fucking junkmail". Tabarnak is the strongest form of that sacre, derived from tabernacle (where the Eucharist is stored, in Roman Catholicism).

Quebec French profanities, known as sacres (singular: sacre; from the verb sacrer, "to consecrate"), are words and expressions related to Catholicism and its liturgy that are used as strong profanities in Quebec French (the main variety of Canadian French), Acadian French (spoken in Maritime Provinces, east of Quebec, and parts of Aroostook County, Maine, in the United States), and traditionally French-speaking areas across Canada. Sacres are considered stronger in Québec than the sexual and scatological profanities common to other varieties of French (such as merde, "shit").

== History ==
The sacres originated in the early 19th century, when the social control exerted by the Catholic clergy was increasingly a source of frustration. One of the oldest sacres is sacrament, which can be thought of as the Franco-Canadian equivalent of the English "goddamn it". It is known to have been in use as early as the 1830s. The word sacrer in its current meaning is believed to come from the expression Ne dites pas ça, c'est sacré ("Don't say that, it is sacred/holy"). Eventually, sacrer started to refer to the words Quebecers were not supposed to say. This is likely related to the commandment "Thou shalt not take the name of the Lord thy God in vain" (Exodus 20:7). The influence and social importance of Catholicism at that time allowed sacres to become powerful forms of profanity.

As a result of the Quiet Revolution in the 1960s, the influence of the Catholic Church in Quebec has declined, but the profanity still persists today.

== List of common sacres ==
These sacres are commonly given in a phonetic spelling to indicate the differences in pronunciation from the original word, several of which (notably, the deletion of final consonants and change of [ɛ] to [a] before /ʁ/) are typical of informal Quebec French. The nouns here can also be modified for use as verbs (see "Non-profane uses", below). Additionally, some forms, notably ostie and criss, can become semi-adjectival when followed by de, as in Va t'en, ostie de chat! (Scram, you fucking cat!); tabarnak is often added at the end for extra emphasis.

Often, several of these words are strung together when used adjectivally, as in Va t'en, ostie d'câlice de chat à marde! (see "Intricate forms", below) and many combinations are possible. Since swear words are voluntarily blasphemous, the spellings are usually different from the words from which they originate. For example, câlice can be written kâliss, calice, caliss, cawliss, and so on. There is no general agreement on how to write these words, and the Office québécois de la langue française does not regulate them.

- baptême [ba.tae̯m]: "baptism"
- câlice [kɑːlɪs] (calice): "chalice"
- ciboire [si.bwɑːʁ]: "ciborium" or "pyx", receptacles in which the host is stored
- criss [kʁɪs] (Christ): "Christ", or crisser, a more emphatic version of sacrer, both verbs meaning "to curse"
- esti [əs.t͡si], [ɛs.t͡si] or ostie [ɔs.t͡si] (hostie): "host"
- maudit [moːd͡zi] (m) or maudite [moːd͡zɪt] (f): "damned" (or "damn")
- sacrament [sa.kʁa.mã] (sacrement): "Sacrament"
- saint [sẽ]: "Saint", added before others (ex. saint-simonaque, saint-sacrament, etc.)
- simonaque [si.mɔ.nak] (simoniaque): from the sin of simony
- tabarnak [ta.baʁ.nak] (tabernacle): "tabernacle"; typically considered the most profane of the sacres
- viarge [vjaʁʒ] (vierge): "the Virgin Mary"

=== Mild forms ===
Most sacres have modified, milder euphemistic forms (see minced oath). Such forms are not usually considered nearly as rude as the original. They are the equivalent of English words such as "gosh", "heck", or "darn". Many of the euphemistic forms are only similar-sounding to religious terms, so are considered not to denigrate the Church directly.

- câlice: câline, câlif, câlique, câline de bine, câlibine, câlibouette
- calvaire: calvâce, calvince, calvinouche, calvinus, calvinice, calverace
- ciboire: cibolle, cibollaque, ciboulle, ciboulette, gériboire
- criss: cristie, crime, crimebine, criff, cliss, christophe, Christophe Colomb, crimpuff (from the English "cream puff"), crique
- esti: titi, estifie, estique, estine, 'sti
- maudit: maudine, mautadine, mautadit, mautadite, maustie, mauzus (from the English "Moses")
- sacrament: sac à papier, sacréfice, sacramouille, Sacramento
- tabarnak: tabarnouche, tabarouette, tabarnouille, batarnak (anagram of tabarnak), tabarchum, tabarslaque, tabarclak, tabarnache, barnac, tabarnane, taberolls, tabréré, tabebouts, tabebruns, tabergaut, tabertix, taberguermon, tabermeuns, taberuph, tabermost, taberax, taberkalu, taberpuch, tabarlan, tabarlie, taberson, tabersiouf, taberbooger, taberkhalil, tabeurn, tabouère (merge of tabarnak and siboire), tabarnoune, tabarwet

The following are also considered milder profanity:

- bâtard: "bastard"
- toton: "boob", used to denote a breast or a complete idiot
- torrieu (tort à Dieu): "harm to God"
- marde (merde): "shit", used in conjunction with other words, sometimes profanity: esti de marde, silo de marde, tas de marde, mange donc un char de marde, pédale de marde, ciboulette de marde, or château de marde, Internet de marde
- câliboire [ˈkɑːˌlɪbwɑːʁ]: a mix between câlice and ciboire

Sometimes older people unable to bring themselves to swear with church words or their derivatives would make up ostensibly innocuous phrases, such as cinq six boîtes de tomates vartes (literally, "five or six boxes of green tomatoes", varte being slang for verte, "green"). This phrase when pronounced quickly by a native speaker sounds like saint-siboire de tabarnak ("holy ciborium of the tabernacle"). Another example of a benign word that is church sounding is coltord, which was simply an anglicism for "coal-tar", but pronounced just so, sounds like a merged câlice and tort ("harm").

=== Intricate forms ===
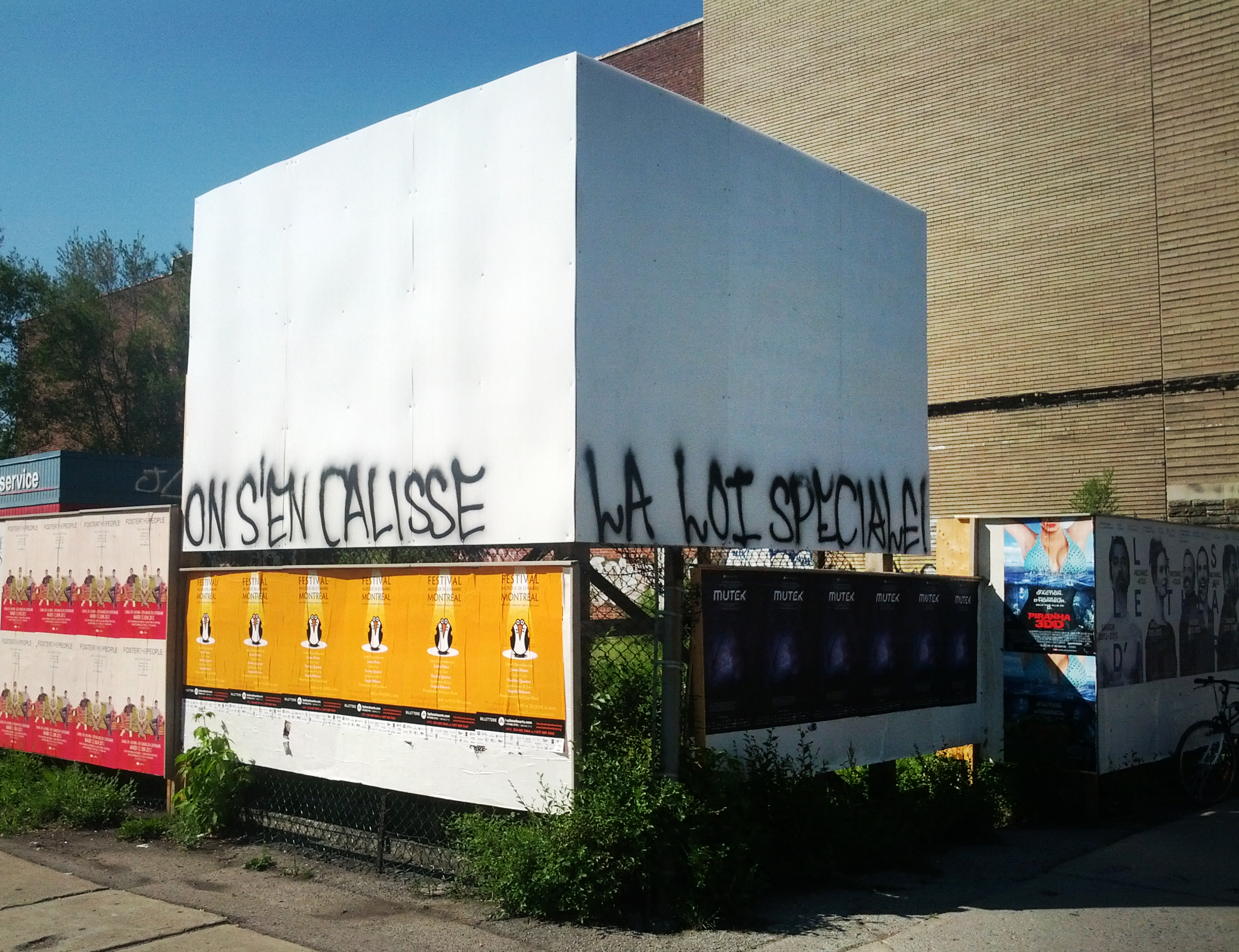
Graffiti in Montreal, Quebec (loosely translated as "We don't give a fuck [about] the special law")

In Québec French, swear words can be combined into more powerful combinations to express extreme anger or disgust. These intricate uses of French profanities can be difficult to master. The combinations are endless; some people in both Quebec and francophone communities in other provinces consider mixing and matching swear words to be a sort of skilled art.

- Mon tabarnak j'vais te décâlisser la yeule, câlice or mon tabarnak, m'a tu t'l'a décâlisser ta gran' yeule: Décâlisser means "to fuck something up"; yeule comes from the derived noun gueule, which refers to an animal's throat or maw, but is used in joual to mean the human mouth or face. The whole sentence can be summarized as "I'm gonna beat your fucking face in, you motherfucker".
- Esti de câlice de tabarnak: Very strong expression of anger. Can also be used as a descriptive phrase expressing anger or derision: Esti de câlice de tabarnak, c'est pas possible comment que t'es cave ("Jesus fucking Christ, there's no way you can be this stupid").
- Crisse de câlice de tabarnak d'esti de sacrament: Expressive of extreme anger.
- Crisse de câlice de tabarnak d'esti de sacrament de trou viarge: Expressive of very extreme anger.
- J'm'en calice: Denotes extreme apathy and suppressed anger, similar to the English "I don't give a fuck". J'm'en calice des politiciens: "I don't give a fuck about politicians."
- Esti d'épais à marde!: Expression of anger aimed at someone perceived to be lacking in intellectual acumen; épais ("thick") is used as a derogatory term meaning "idiot", with esti ("Eucharist") and à marde ("of shit") acting as intensifiers

== Use ==
A very strong way to express anger or frustration is to use the words tabarnak, sacrament, and câlice. Depending on the context and the tone of the phrases, it might make everybody quiet, but some people use these words to add rhythm or emphasis to sentences.

Usually, more than one of these words is used in Franco-Canadian profanity. The words are simply connected with de (of), without any restrictions. Long strings of invective can be connected in this way, and the resulting expression does not have to have any concrete meaning—for example, Mon ostie de saint-sacrament de câlice de crisse (literally, "My host of (the) holy sacrament of (the) chalice of Christ"). Non-religious terms may also be strung together in this way, as in Mon crisse de char est brisé, câlisse de tabarnak (literally, "My Christ of (a) car is broken, chalice of (the) tabernacle"). In areas where English is also commonly spoken, English expletives are often inserted. Fuck ostie ("Fuck [the] host") is common in Quebec.

The adjective fucké (with meanings varying from "crazy, disturbed" to "broken down") is much milder than "fucked" is in English. It is routinely used in, for instance, TV sitcom dialogue. The same goes for "shit" (which in Quebec French is used only as an interjection expressing dismay, never as the noun for excrement). When used as a verb, Va chier (literally, "Go shit"), means not to excrete but rather to "fuck off". When used in the past-tense chié, it is used exactly as fucké: Mes souliers sont chiés ("My shoes are fucked", literally: "My shoes are shitted").

Even English-language dialogue containing these words can appear on Quebec French-language television without bleeping. For example, in 2003, when punks rioted in Montreal because a concert by the band The Exploited had been cancelled, TV news reporters solemnly read out a few lyrics and song titles from their album Fuck the System. The same is not true of Quebec's English-language television stations, which follow the same guidelines as other stations in Canada. In November 2017 the CRTC ruled that "fuck" is not a swear word in French.

== Non-profane uses ==
A slang term with the preposition en means "a lot of": d’la bouffe en tabarnak (or en crisse, etc.) means "a lot of food", similar to English constructs such as "fuck-ton" or "shitload".

Sacres are often used as verbs too. For example, crisser une volée means "to beat the fuck out of", "to kick one's ass" or, more literally, "to give a beating", where crisser is used as a stronger form of "to give" (donner in French). There are constructions like détabarnaker or décrisser, which means "to leave" or "to destroy", using the dé prefix, which is about separation. Others include s’en câlicer or s’en crisser ("to not give a damn"), sacrer son camp or crisser son camp ("to run away"), and décâlisser. Some are even found as adverbs, such as sacrament, meaning "very" or "extremely", as in C’est sacrament bon ("This is really good"). En tabarnak or en câlisse can mean "extremely angry".

In the movie Bon Cop, Bad Cop, Quebec actor and stand-up comic Patrick Huard's character teaches Colm Feore's how to swear properly.

These expressions are found less commonly in literature, but rappers and other singers often use criss and câlice as a rhyme. More traditional singers also use these words, such as Quebec singer Plume Latraverse.

One fine example of the use of sacres as different word classes is a dialogue by Les Cyniques called Le cours de sacres. The phrase Jules, étant irrité, a expulsé violemment Jacques qui était en colère ("Jules, who was irritated, violently ejected Jacques, who was angry.") becomes Le sacrament qui était en calvaire a calissé dehors l’ostie en tabarnak ("That fucker, who was pissed off, kicked out that dickhead, who was fucking furious.") with each content word (noun, verb, adjective or adverb) replaced with a profane synonym. This usage of sacres is similar to the form of Russian swearing known as mat.

== Possible Protestant origin ==
The expression of ideas linked to the Protestant (Huguenot) faith can be considered, looking at both the initial meaning expressed by the swear words and the geographic origin of the settlers of New-France.

Since the roughly twenty initial words have generated close to four hundred euphemisms and thousands of set constructions, all equally present in all regions of Quebec, it would make more sense to have them begin their development at an earlier time than the mid-nineteenth century.

=== Meaning ===
The main Quebec swear words refer to aspects of Catholic worship and practice that Calvinists have historically rejected or objected to, including eucharistic adoration, transubstantiation, the Virgin Mary (viarge) and simony (simonaque). They are expressed in French rather than Latin.

"The reformers unanimously rejected transubstantiation, ... understand that words alone are not strong enough to illustrate this philosophy" and "You have to understand the hatred they feel in the face of what they perceive as a fraud".

=== Settler origin ===
16th-century religious geopolitics on a map of modern France

Origins of immigrants to New France from 1608–1700

About a third of the established settlers came from the Pays de Caux in the Northern part of Normandy "The Pays de Caux ... formed a kind of triangle bounded by the port cities of Rouen, Dieppe and Le Havre. These three communities stand out as the only real points of concentration (settler provenance in Normandy)" also "The Pays de Caux housed probably the largest concentration of rural Protestants north of the Loire" and another third from the Poitou area (which includes Angoumois, Aunis, Saintonge), where lived France's greatest concentrations of Huguenots at that time.

This fact has already been noted in a different context: "The geographical areas where women were recruited coincide with the Protestant areas".

It appears that throughout the New-France period, settlement originated from French Protestant strongholds as the increasing pressure from the Counter-Reformation made it harder and harder for them to live in France. This would suggest that Quebec swear words were originally an expression of their religious principles.

== Comparison to other languages ==
The use of liturgical profanity is not unique to Canadian French or Quebec. In Italian, although to a lesser extent, some analogous words are in use: in particular, ostia (host) and (more so in the past) sacramento are relatively common expressions in the northeast, which are lighter (and a little less common) than the typical blasphemies in use in Italy, such as porco Dio (pig god) and porca Madonna (see Italian profanity). Modifying the terms into euphemistic equivalents is used in Italy; for example, ostia is commonly modified to osteria (a type of restaurant). The word sacramento has produced the verb sacramentare, which colloquially means "to use blasphemy".

Other dialects in the world feature this kind of profanity, such as the expressions Sakrament and Kruzifix noch einmal in Austro-Bavarian and krucifix in Czech. La hostia is an expletive expression in some Spanish dialects. In Catalan, hòstia is used and is frequently abbreviated to osti. Spanish also uses me cago en ... ("I shit on ...") followed by "God", "the blessed chalice", "the Virgin" and other terms, religious or not. It can be shortened to just ¡La virgen! or ¡Copón bendito! ("Blessed chalice!"). In Romanian, the profanity anafura mă-tii! ("Your mother's host!") is sometimes used with "Easter", "Christ", "Cross", "Commemoration" (parastas), "sacred oil lamp" (tu-i candela 'mă-sii), "God", "Church", etc.

Sheila Fischman's translation of La Guerre, yes Sir! (published under that title in French and English and meaning roughly "War, you bet!"), by Roch Carrier, leaves many sacres in the original Quebec French, since they have no real equivalent in English. She gives a brief explanation and history of these terms in her introduction, including a few not listed here. At a crucial point in the story, a boy swears in the presence of his father. For the first time, instead of beating or punishing his son, the father swears back. This represents the boy's passage into manhood.

Irish Catholics of old employed a similar practice, whereby "ejaculations" were used to express frustration without cursing or profaning (taking the Lord's name in vain). This typically involved the recitation of a rhyming couplet, where a shocked person might say, "Jesus who, for love of me / Died on the Cross at Calvary" instead of "Jesus!" This is often abbreviated simply to "Jesus-hoo-fer-luv-a-me", an expression still heard among elderly Irish people. "Jesus, Mary and Joseph!" is used in Quebec French: Jésus, Marie, Joseph!

Hungarians, primarily Catholics, follow the same suit: instead of Isten (God) or as a curse, az Istenit! (the God of it!), they often use another word which also begins with is: iskoláját (the school of it!) or istállóját (the stable of it!).

== See also ==
- Joual
- Sacred–profane dichotomy
