= Quebec French =

Variety of French spoken in Quebec

- French of Quebec
- français québécois (French)
- Native to: Quebec (primary location and sole official language); Ontario; Western Canada; New England; Michigan; Florida (especially Hallandale Beach)
- Ethnicity: Québécois people
- Native speakers: 7 million in Quebec; 700,000 speakers elsewhere in Canada and the United States (2006) (Note: Source: A 2006 Census of Canada. Includes multiple responses. The simplifying assumption has been made that there are no native speakers of Quebec French in Atlantic Canada (see Acadian French) but that all native speakers of French in the rest of Canada are speakers of Quebec French.)
- Language family: Indo-European: Italic; Latino-Faliscan; Romance; Italo-Western; Western Romance; Gallo-Romance; Arpitan–Oïl; Oïl; Francien zone; French; Quebec French
- Early forms: Vulgar Latin: Old Gallo-Romance; Old French; Middle French
- Writing system: Latin script (French alphabet); French Braille
- Signed forms: Signed French (français signé)

Official status
- Official language in: Quebec
- Regulated by: Office québécois de la langue française

Language codes
- ISO 639-3: –
- Glottolog: queb1247
- Linguasphere: 51-AAA-hq
- IETF: fr-u-sd-caqc

Quebec French (French: français québécois, pronounced [fʁãsɛ kebekwa]) is the predominant variety of the French language spoken in Canada. It is the dominant language of the province of Quebec, used in everyday communication, in education, the media, and government.

Maxime, a speaker of Québécois French, recorded in Slovenia.

Canadian French is a common umbrella term to describe all varieties of French used in Canada, including Quebec French. Formerly it was used to refer solely to Quebec French and the closely related dialects spoken in Ontario and Western Canada, in contrast with Acadian French, which is spoken in some areas of eastern Quebec (Gaspé Peninsula), New Brunswick, and in other parts of Atlantic Canada, as well as Métis French, which is found generally across the Prairie provinces.

The term joual is commonly used to refer to Quebec working class French (when considered a basilect), characterized by certain features often perceived as phased out, "old world" or "incorrect" in standard French. (Note: Entry for joual in Dictionnaire du français Plus. "Variété de français québécois qui est caractérisée par un ensemble de traits (surtout phonétiques et lexicaux) considérés comme incorrects ou mauvais et qui est identifiée au parler des classes populaires.") Joual, in particular, exhibits strong Norman influences largely owing to Norman immigration during the Ancien Régime; people from Normandy were perceived as true Catholics and allowed to emigrate to the new world as an example of ideal French settlers. The Acadian French equivalent of joual is called Chiac.

== History ==
The origins of Quebec French lie in the 17th- and 18th-century regional varieties (dialects) of early modern French, also known as Classical French, and of other langues d'oïl (especially Poitevin dialect, Saintongeais dialect, Norman and Picard) that French colonists brought to New France. Quebec French either evolved from this language base and was shaped by the following influences (arranged according to historical period) or was imported from Paris and other urban centres of France as a koiné, or common language shared by the people speaking it.

=== New France ===
Unlike the language of France in the 17th and 18th centuries, French in New France was fairly well unified. It acquired loan words, especially place names such as Québec, Canada and Hochelaga, and words to describe the flora and fauna such as atoca (cranberry) and achigan (bass), from First Nations languages.

The importance of the rivers and ocean as the main routes of transportation also left its imprint on Quebec French. Whereas European varieties of French use the verbs monter and descendre for "to get in" and "to get out" of a vehicle (lit. 'to mount' or 'to dismount', as one does with a horse or a carriage), the Québécois variety in its informal register tends to use embarquer and débarquer, a result of Quebec's navigational heritage.

=== British rule ===
With the onset of British rule in 1760, the French of Canada became isolated from that of Europe. This led to a retention of older pronunciations, such as moé for moi (audio comparison) and expressions that later died out in France. In 1774, the Quebec Act guaranteed French settlers as British subjects rights to French law, the Roman Catholic faith and the French language to appease them at a moment when the English-speaking colonies to the south were on the verge of revolting in the American Revolution.

=== 1840 to 1960 ===
In the period between the Act of Union of 1840 and 1960, roughly 900,000 French Canadians left Canada to emigrate to the United States to seek employment. The ones that returned, brought with them new words taken from their experiences in the New England textile mills and the northern lumber camps. As a result, Quebec French began to borrow from both Canadian and American English to fill accidental gaps in the lexical fields of government, law, manufacturing, business and trade.

=== 1960 to 1982 ===
From the Quiet Revolution to the passing of the Charter of the French Language, the French language in Quebec saw a period of validation in its varieties associated with the working class while the percentage of literate and university-educated francophones grew. Laws concerning the status of French were passed both on the federal and provincial levels. The Office québécois de la langue française was established to play an essential role of support in language planning. Protective laws and distaste towards anglicisms arose at the same time to preserve the integrity of Quebec French, while Metropolitan French on the other hand does not have that same protective attitude and in recent decades has been more influenced by English, causing Quebec French not to borrow recent English loanwords that are now used in Metropolitan French.

== Social perception and language policy ==
=== Mutual intelligibility with other varieties of French ===
There is a continuum of intelligibility between Quebec and European French; the two are most intelligible in their more standardized forms and pose more difficulties in their dialectal forms. The differences between both varieties are analogous to those between American and British English even if differences in phonology and prosody for the latter are greater.

Quebec's culture has only recently gained exposure in Europe, especially since the Quiet Revolution (Révolution tranquille). The difference in dialects and culture is large enough that speakers of Quebec French overwhelmingly prefer their own local television dramas or sitcoms to shows from Europe or the United States. Conversely, numerous singers from Quebec have become famous even in France, including Félix Leclerc, Gilles Vigneault, Kate and Anna McGarrigle, Céline Dion, Garou, Cœur de pirate, and Charlotte Cardin. Some television series from Quebec such as Têtes à claques and L'Été indien are also known in France. The number of such shows from France shown on Quebec television is about the same as the number of British shows on American television even though French news channels like France 24 and a francophone channel based in France, TV5 Québec Canada, are broadcast in Quebec. Nevertheless, Metropolitan French series such as The Adventures of Tintin and Les Gens de Mogador are broadcast and known in Quebec. In certain cases, on French TV, subtitles can be added when barbarisms, rural speech and slang are used, not unlike cases in the US of a number of British programmes being shown with subtitles (notably those from Scotland).

== Relation to European French ==
Historically speaking, the closest relative of Quebec French is the 17th and 18th-century koiné of Paris.

Formal Quebec French uses essentially the same orthography and grammar as the French of France, with few exceptions, and exhibits moderate lexical differences. Differences in grammar and lexicon become more marked as language becomes more informal.

While phonetic differences also decrease with greater formality, Quebec and European accents are readily distinguishable in all registers. Over time, European French has exerted a strong influence on Quebec French. The phonological features traditionally distinguishing informal Quebec French and formal European French have gradually acquired varying sociolinguistic status, so that certain traits of Quebec French are perceived neutrally or positively by Québécois, while others are perceived negatively.

=== Perceptions ===
Sociolinguistic studies conducted in the 1960s and 1970s showed that Québécois generally rated speakers of European French heard in recordings higher than speakers of Quebec French in many positive traits, including expected intelligence, education, ambition, friendliness and physical strength. The researchers were surprised by the greater friendliness rating for Europeans, since one of the primary reasons usually advanced to explain the retention of low-status language varieties is social solidarity with members of one's linguistic group. François Labelle cites the efforts at that time by the Office québécois de la langue française "to impose a standard as French as possible" as one of the reasons for the negative view Québécois had of their language variety.

Since the 1970s, the official position on Québécois language has shifted dramatically. An oft-cited turning point was the 1977 declaration of the Association québécoise des professeurs de français defining thus the language to be taught in classrooms: "Standard Quebec French [le français standard d'ici, literally, 'the Standard French of here'] is the socially favoured variety of French which the majority of Francophone Québécois tend to use in situations of formal communication." (Note: Original text: "Le français standard d'ici est la variété de français socialement valorisée que la majorité des Québécois francophones tendent à utiliser dans les situations de communication formelle.")

Ostiguy and Tousignant doubt whether Québécois today would still have the same negative attitudes towards their own variety of French that they did in the 1970s. They argue that negative social attitudes have focused instead on a subset of the characteristics of Quebec French relative to European French, and particularly some traits of informal Quebec French. Some characteristics of European French are even judged negatively when imitated by Québécois. (Note: See for example Ostiguy & Tousignant, p. 68, on the perception as "pedantic" of the use of the tense allophones [i], [y], [u], where [ɪ], [ʏ], [ʊ] would be expected in Quebec French. "En effet, l'utilisation des voyelles tendues peut avoir allure de pédanterie à l'oreille d'une majorité de Québécois.")

=== Typography ===
Quebec French has some typographical differences from European French. For example, in Quebec French a full non-breaking space is not used before the semicolon, exclamation mark, or question mark. Instead, a thin space (which according to Le Ramat de la typographie normally measures a quarter of an em) is used; this thin space can be omitted in word-processing situations where the thin space is assumed to be unavailable, or when careful typography is not required.

=== Spelling and grammar ===
==== Formal language ====
A notable difference in grammar which received considerable attention in France during the 1990s is the feminine form of many professions that traditionally did not have a feminine form. (Note: The Académie française has taken strong positions opposing the officialization of feminine forms in these cases. Lionel Jospin's female cabinet ministers were the first to be referred to as Madame la ministre instead of Madame le ministre, whereas this had been common practice in Canada for decades.) In Quebec, one writes nearly universally une chercheuse or une chercheure "a researcher", whereas in France, un chercheur and, more recently, un chercheur and une chercheuse are used. Feminine forms in -eure as in ingénieure are still strongly criticized in France by institutions like the Académie française, but are commonly used in Canada and Switzerland.

There are other, sporadic spelling differences. For example, the Office québécois de la langue française formerly recommended the spelling tofou for what is in France tofu "tofu". This recommendation was repealed in 2013. In grammar, the adjective inuit "Inuit" is invariable in France but, according to official recommendations in Quebec, has regular feminine and plural forms.

==== Informal language ====
Grammatical differences between informal spoken Quebec French and the formal language abound. Some of these, such as omission of the negative particle ne, are also present in the informal language of speakers of standard European French, while other features, such as use of the interrogative particle -tu, are either peculiar to Quebec or Canadian French or restricted to nonstandard varieties of European French.

=== Lexis ===
==== Distinctive features ====
While the overwhelming majority of lexical items in Quebec French exist in other dialects of French, many words and expressions are unique to Quebec, much like some are specific to American and British varieties of English. The differences can be classified into the following five categories. The influences on Quebec French from English and Native American can be reflected in any of these five:

- lexically specific items (québécismes lexématiques), which do not exist in other varieties of French;
- semantic differences (québécismes sémantiques), in which a word has a different meaning in Quebec French than in other French varieties;
- grammatical differences in lexical items (québécismes grammaticaux), in which a word has different morpho-syntactic behaviour in Quebec French than in other varieties;
- differences in multi-word or fixed expressions (québécismes phraséologiques);
- contextual differences (roughly, québécisme de statut), in which the lexical item has a similar form and meaning in Quebec French as in other varieties, but the context in which the item is used is different.

The following tables give examples of each of the first four categories, along with the Metropolitan French equivalent and an English gloss. Contextual differences, along with individual explanations, are then discussed.

Examples of lexically specific items:

| Quebec French | Metropolitan French | English gloss |
|---|---|---|
| abrier | couvrir | to cover |
| astheure (à c't'heure) | maintenant | now |
| chum (m) | copain (m) | friend (m) or boyfriend |
| chum (f) | amie (f) | friend (f) |
| magasiner | faire des courses | to go shopping/do errands |
| placoter | papoter | to chat/chatter |
| pogner | attraper, prendre | to catch, grab |

Examples of semantic differences:

| Lexical item | Quebec French meaning | Metropolitan French meaning |
|---|---|---|
| blonde (f) | girlfriend | blonde-haired woman |
| char (m) | car | tank |
| chauffer | to drive (a vehicle) | to heat |
| chialer | to complain | to bawl, blubber |
| dépanneur (m) | convenience store (and also repairer) | mechanic |
| gosse | gosses (fem pl): balls (testicles) | gosse (masc sg): child/kid |
| suçon (m) | lollipop | hickey/love bite |
| sucette (f) | hickey/love bite | lollipop |
| éventuellement | eventually | possibly |

Examples of grammatical differences:

| Lexical item | Quebec French grammar | Metropolitan French grammar | English gloss |
|---|---|---|---|
| autobus (noun) | autobus (f) (colloquial) | autobus (m) | bus |
| pantalon (noun) | pantalons (pl) | pantalon (masc sg) | trousers |

Examples multi-word or fixed expressions unique to Quebec:

| Quebec French expression | Metropolitan French gloss | English gloss |
|---|---|---|
| avoir de la misère | avoir de la difficulté | to have difficulty, trouble |
| avoir le flu | avoir la diarrhée | to have diarrhea |
| avoir le goût dérangé | gouter une saveur étrange | to taste something strange, unexpected |
| en arracher | en baver | to have a rough time |
| prendre une marche | faire une promenade | to take a walk |
| se faire passer un sapin | se faire duper | to be tricked |
| parler à travers son chapeau | parler à tort et à travers | to talk through one's hat |

Some Quebec French lexical items have the same general meaning in Metropolitan French but are used in different contexts. English translations are given in parentheses.

- arrêt (stop): In Quebec, most stop signs say arrêt. Some Quebec stop signs say stop and older signs use both words. However, in France, all such signs say stop, which is the standard in Europe.
- condom, pronounced [kɔ̃dɔ̃] (condom): In Quebec French, this term has neutral connotations, whereas in Metropolitan French, it is used in more technical contexts. The neutral term in Metropolitan French is préservatif.

In addition, Quebec French has its own set of swear words, or sacres, distinct from other varieties of French.

===== Use of anglicisms =====
One characteristic of major sociological importance distinguishing Quebec from European French is the relatively greater number of borrowings from English, especially in the informal spoken language, but that notion is often exaggerated. The Québécois have been found to show a stronger aversion to the use of anglicisms in formal contexts than do European francophones, largely because of what the influence of English on their language is held to reveal about the historically superior position of anglophones in Canadian society. According to Cajolet-Laganière and Martel, out of 4,216 "criticized borrowings from English" in Quebec French that they were able to identify, some 93% have "extremely low frequency" and 60% are obsolete. (Note: That very low frequency was confirmed in a corpus of two million words of spoken French corpus from the Ottawa-Hull region by Poplack et al. (1988).) Despite this, the prevalence of anglicisms in Quebec French has often been exaggerated.

Various anglicisms commonly used in European French informal language are mostly not used by Quebec French speakers. While words such as shopping, parking, escalator, ticket, email and week-end are commonly spoken in Europe, Quebec tends to favour French equivalents, namely: magasinage, stationnement, escalier roulant, billet, courriel and fin de semaine, respectively. As such, the perception of exaggerated anglicism use in Quebec French could be attributed, in part, simply to the fact that the anglicisms used are different, and thus more noticeable by European speakers.

French spoken with a large number of anglicisms may be disparagingly termed franglais. According to Chantal Bouchard, "While the language spoken in Quebec did indeed gradually accumulate borrowings from English [between 1850 and 1960], it did not change to such an extent as to justify the extraordinarily negative discourse about it between 1940 and 1960. It is instead in the loss of social position suffered by a large proportion of Francophones since the end of the 19th century that one must seek the principal source of this degrading perception." (Note: Original text: "En effet, si la langue parlée au Québec s'est peu à peu chargée d'emprunts à l'anglais au cours de cette période, elle ne s'est pas transformée au point de justifier le discours extraordinairement négatif qu'on tient à son sujet de 1940 à 1960. C'est bien plutôt dans le déclassement subi par une forte proportion des francophones depuis la fin du XIX^{e} siècle qu'il faut chercher la source de cette perception dépréciative.)

===== Borrowings from Indigenous languages =====
Ouaouaron, the Canadian French word for bullfrog, a frog species native to North America, originates from an Iroquois word.

Maringouin, the word for mosquito, originates from Tupi-guarani, that used to be spoken on the northern coasts of Brazil. It is thought that early French colonists adopted this word in the late 1600s after exchanges with explorers returning from South America.

Atoca, a synonym for cranberry, also originates from Iroquois.

===== Additional differences =====
The following are areas in which the lexicon of Quebec French is found to be distinct from those of other varieties of French:

- lexical items formerly common to both France and New France but are today unique to Quebec French (this includes expressions and word forms that have the same form elsewhere in La Francophonie but have a different denotation or connotation);
- borrowings from Amerindian languages, especially place names;
- les sacres – Quebec French profanity;
- many loanwords, calques, and other borrowings from English in the 19th and 20th centuries, whether or not such borrowings are considered Standard French;
- starting in the latter half of the 20th century, an enormous store of French neologisms (coinages) and re-introduced words via terminological work by professionals, translators, and the OLF; some of this terminology is "exported" to the rest of la Francophonie;
- feminized job titles and gender-inclusive language;
- morphological processes that have been more productive:
  1. suffixes: -eux/euse, -age, -able, and -oune
  2. reduplication (as in the international French word guéguerre): cacanne, gogauche, etc.
  3. reduplication plus -oune: chouchoune, gougounes, moumoune, nounoune, poupoune, toutoune, foufoune, etc.
  4. new words ending in -oune without reduplication: zoune, bizoune, coune, ti-coune, etc.

==== Recent lexical innovations ====
Some recent Quebec French lexical innovations have spread, at least partially, to other varieties of French, for example:

- clavardage, "chat", a contraction of clavier (keyboard) and bavardage (chat). Verb: clavarder
- courriel, "e-mail", a contraction of courrier électronique (electronic mail)
- pourriel, "spam e-mail", is a contraction of poubelle (garbage) and courriel (email), whose popularity may also be influenced by the word pourri (rotten).
- baladodiffusion (may be abbreviated to balado), "podcasting", a contraction of baladeur (walkman) and radiodiffusion.

=== Sociolinguistics ===
On Twitter, supporters of the Quebec separatist party Bloc Québécois used hashtags that align with the syntactic pattern found in hashtags used in French political discourse, rather than adopting the hashtags commonly used by other Canadian parties with similar political positions.

== Phonology ==
=== Vowels ===
==== Systematic (in all formal speech) ====
- /ɑ/, /ɛː/, /œ̃/ and /ə/ as phonemes distinct from /a/, /ɛ/, /ɛ̃/ and /ø/ respectively
- [ɪ], [ʏ], [ʊ] are lax allophones of /i/, /y/, /u/ in closed syllables
- Nasal vowels are similar to the traditional Parisian French: /ɛ̃/ is diphthongized to [ẽɪ̯̃], /ɔ̃/ is diphthongized to [õʊ̯̃], /ɑ̃/ is fronted to [ã], and /œ̃/ is generally pronounced [œ̃˞]
- /a/ is pronounced [ɑ] in final open syllables (avocat /avɔka/ → [avɔkɑ])
- /a/ is pronounced [ɑː] before /ʁ/ in final closed syllables (dollar /dɔlaʁ/ → [dɔlɑːʁ])

==== Systematic (in both informal and formal speech) ====
- Long vowels are diphthongized in final closed syllables (tête /tɛːt/ → [tɛɪ̯t] ~ [taɪ̯t], the first one is considered as formal, because the diphthong is weak)
- Standard French /a/ is pronounced [ɔ] in final open syllables (avocat /avɔka/ → [avɔkɔ])

==== Unsystematic (in all informal speech) ====
- /wa/ (spelled oi) is pronounced [wɛ], [we] or [waɛ̯]
- /ɛʁ/ is pronounced [aʁ]

=== Consonants ===
==== Systematic ====
- /t/ and /d/ are affricated to [t͡s] and [d͡z] before /i/, /y/, /j/, /ɥ/ (except in Gaspésie–Îles-de-la-Madeleine and Côte-Nord)

===== Unsystematic =====
- liquids /l/ and /ʁ/ (written as l and r) are dropped in unstressed position with schwa /ə/ or unstressed intervocalic position
- Trilled r – [r]

=== Sociolinguistic status of selected phonological traits ===
These examples are intended not exhaustive but illustrate the complex influence that European French has had on Quebec French pronunciation and the range of sociolinguistic statuses that individual phonetic variables can possess.

- The most entrenched features of Quebec pronunciation are such that their absence, even in the most formal registers, is considered an indication of foreign origin of the speaker. That is the case, for example, for the affrication of /t/ and /d/ before /i/, /y/, /j/ and /ɥ/. (This particular feature of Quebec French is, however, sometimes avoided in singing.)
- The use of the lax Quebec allophones of /i/, /y/, /u/ (in the appropriate phonetic contexts) occurs in all but highly formal styles, and even then, their use predominates. Use of the tense allophones where the lax ones would be expected can be perceived as "pedantic".
- The Quebec variant of nasal vowels [ã], [ẽɪ̯̃], [õʊ̯̃] and [œ̃˞] corresponding to the Parisian [ɒ̃] (traditionally pronounced [ɑ̃]), [æ̃] (traditionally pronounced [ɛ̃]), [õ] (traditionally pronounced [ɔ̃]) and [æ̃] (traditionally pronounced [œ̃]) are not subject to a significant negative sociolinguistic evaluation and are used by most speakers and of educated speakers in all circumstances. However, Parisian variants also appear occasionally in formal speech among a few speakers, especially speakers who were often watching cartoons when they were a child, because the dubbing affected them and it is not considered as a Quebec accent. Some speakers use them in Radio-Canada, but they never have brin-brun merger (The preceding discussion applies to stressed syllables. For reasons unrelated to their social standing, some allophones close to the European variants appear frequently in unstressed syllables.)
- To pronounce [ɔː] instead of [ɑː] in such words as gâteau clearly predominates in informal speech and, according to Ostiguy and Tousignant, is likely not to be perceived negatively in informal situations. However, sociolinguistic research has shown that not to be the case in formal speech, when the standard [ɑː] is more common. However, many speakers use [ɔː] systematically in all situations, and Ostiguy and Tousignant hypothesize that such speakers tend to be less educated. It must be mentioned that a third vowel [a], though infrequent, also occurs and is the vowel that has emerged with /a/ as a new European standard in the last several decades for words in this category. (Note: For example, while The New Cassell's French dictionary (1962) records gâteau as [ɡɑto] and Le Nouveau Petit Robert (1993) gives the pronunciation [ɡato].) According to Ostiguy and Tousignant, this pronunciation is seen as "affected", and Dumas writes that speakers using this pronunciation "run the risk of being accused of snobbery." Entirely analogous considerations apply to the two pronunciations of such words as chat, which can be pronounced [ʃɑ] or [ʃɔ].
- The diphthonged variants of such words as fête (e.g. [faɪ̯t] instead of [fɛːt]), are rarely used in formal speech. They have been explicitly and extensively stigmatized and were, according to the official Quebec educational curricula of 1959 and 1969, among the pronunciation habits to be "standardized" in pupils. In informal speech, however, most speakers use generally such forms to some extent, but they are viewed negatively and are more frequent among uneducated speakers. However, many Québécois teachers use the diphthongization.
- Traditional pronunciations such as [pwɛl] for poil (also [pwal], as in France. Words in this category include avoine, (ils) reçoivent, noirci, etc.) and [mwe] for moi (now usually [mwa], as in France; this category consists of moi, toi, and verb forms such as (je) bois and (on) reçoit but excludes québécois and toit, which have had only the pronunciation [wa]), are no longer used by many speakers, and are virtually absent from formal speech. They have long been the object of condemnation. Dumas writes that the [we] pronunciations of words in the moi category have "even become the symbol and the scapegoat of bad taste, lack of education, vulgarity, etc., no doubt because they differ quite a bit from the accepted pronunciation, which ends in [wa], [...]" On the other hand, writing in 1987, he considers [wɛ] in words in the poil group "the most common pronunciation."
- One of the most striking changes that has affected Quebec French in recent decades is the displacement of the alveolar trill r [r] by the uvular trill r [ʀ], originally from Northern France, and similar acoustically to the Parisian uvular r [ʁ]. Historically, the alveolar r predominated in western Quebec, including Montreal, and the uvular r in eastern Quebec, including Quebec City, with an isogloss near Trois-Rivières. (More precisely, the isogloss runs through Yamachiche and then between Sherbrooke and La Patrie, near the American border. With only a few exceptions, the alveolar variant predominates in Canada outside Quebec.) Elocution teachers and the clergy traditionally favoured the trilled r, which was nearly universal in Montreal until the 1950s and was perceived positively. However, massive migration from eastern Quebec beginning in the 1930s with the Great Depression, the participation of soldiers in the Second World War, travel to Europe after the war, and especially the use of the uvular r in radio and then television broadcasts all quickly reversed perceptions and favoured the spread of the uvular r. The trilled r is now rapidly declining. According to Ostiguy and Tousignant, the change occurred within a single generation. The Parisian uvular r is also present in Quebec, and its use is positively correlated with socioeconomic status.

== Syntax ==
Like other varieties, Quebec French is characterized by increasingly wide gaps between its formal and informal forms. Notable differences include the generalized use of on (informal for nous), the use of single negations as opposed to double negations: J'ai pas (informal) vs Je n'ai pas (formal) etc. There are increasing differences between the syntax used in spoken Quebec French and that of other regional dialects of French. However, the characteristic differences of Quebec French syntax are not considered standard despite their high-frequency in everyday, relaxed speech.

One far-reaching difference is the weakening of the syntactic role of the specifiers (both verbal and nominal), which results in many syntactic changes:

- Relative clauses (1) using que as an all-purpose relative pronoun, or (2) embedding interrogative pronouns instead of relative pronouns (also found in informal European French):
  1. J'ai trouvé le document que j'ai de besoin. (J'ai trouvé le document dont j'ai besoin.) "I found / I've found the document I need."
  2. Je comprends qu'est-ce que tu veux dire. (Je comprends ce que tu veux dire.) "I understand what you mean."
- Omission of the prepositions that collocate with certain verbs:
  - J'ai un enfant à m'occuper. (Standard French: s'occuper de; J'ai un enfant dont je dois m'occuper.) "I have a child (I need) to take care of."
- Plural conditioned by semantics:
  - La plupart du monde sont tannés des taxes. (La plupart du monde est tanné des taxes.) "Most people are fed up with taxes."
- A phenomenon throughout the Francophonie, dropping the ne of the double negative is accompanied, in Quebec French, by a change in word order (1), and (2) postcliticisation of direct pronouns (3) along with euphonic insertion of [z] liaisons to avoid vowel hiatus. This word order is also found in non-standard European French.
  1. Donne-moi-le pas. (Ne me le donne pas.) "Don't give it to me."
  2. Dis-moi pas de m'en aller! (Ne me dis pas de m'en aller) "Don't tell me to go away!"
  3. Donne-moi-z-en pas ! (Ne m'en donne pas!) "Don't give me any!"

Other notable syntactic changes in Quebec French include the following:

- Use of non-standard verbal periphrasis, (many of them archaisms):
  - J'étais pour te le dire. (J'allais te le dire. / J'étais sur le point de te le dire.) "I was going to/about to tell you about it." (old European French but still used in e.g. Haiti)
  - Avoir su, j'aurais... (Si j'avais su, j'aurais...) "Had I known, I would have..."
  - Mais que l'hiver finisse, je vais partir. (Dès que l'hiver finira, je partirai.) "As soon as winter ends, I will leave."
- Particle -tu used (1) to form tag questions, (2) sometimes to express exclamative sentences and (3) at other times it is used with excess, for instance (note that this is common throughout European French via the addition of -t'y or -tu):
  - C'est-tu prêt? (Est-ce prêt? / C'est prêt? / Est-ce que c'est prêt?) "Is it ready?"
  - Vous voulez-tu manger? (Vous voulez manger?) "Do you want to eat?"
  - On a-tu bien mangé! (Qu'est-ce qu'on a bien mangé!) "We ate well, didn't we?"
  - T'as-tu pris tes pilules? (Est-ce que tu as pris tes médicaments?) "Have you taken your medications?"
  - This particle is -ti (from Standard French -t-il, often rendered as [t͡si]) in most varieties of North American French outside Quebec as well as in European varieties of français populaire as already noted by Gaston Paris. It is also found in the non-creole speech on the island of Saint-Barthelemy in the Caribbean.
- Extensive use of litotes (also common in informal European French):
  - Il fait pas chaud! (Il fait frais!) "It is not all too warm out!"
  - C'est pas laid pantoute! (Ce n'est pas laid du tout!) "Isn't this nice!" (literally: "This is not ugly at all.")
  - Comment vas-tu? – Pas pire, pas pire. "How are you? – Not bad. Not bad at all"

However, these features are common to all the basilectal varieties of français populaire descended from the 17th century koiné of Paris.

- Use of diminutives (also very common in European French):
  - Tu prendrais-tu un p'tit café? Une p'tite bière? "Would you like to have a coffee? A beer?"

== Pronouns ==
- In common with the rest of the Francophonie, there is a shift from nous to on in all registers. In post-Quiet Revolution Quebec, the use of informal tu has become widespread in many situations that had previously called for a semantically singular vous. While some schools are trying to re-introduce this use of vous, which is absent from most youths' speech, the shift from nous to on has not been similarly discouraged.
- The traditional indefinite use of on, in turn, is usually replaced by different uses of pronouns or paraphrases, like in the rest of the Francophonie. The second person (tu, t') is usually used by speakers when referring to experiences that can happen in one's life:
  - Quand t'es ben tranquille chez vous, à te mêler de tes affaires ...
- Other paraphrases using le monde, les gens are more employed when referring to overgeneralisations:
  - Le monde aime pas voyager dans un autobus plein.
- As in the rest of la Francophonie, the sound [l] is disappearing in il, ils among informal registers and rapid speech. More particular to Quebec is the transformation of elle to [a], sometimes written "a" or "à" in eye dialect or al [al], and less often [ɛ], [e], sometimes written "è." Elle est may transform to 'est, pronounced [e:].
- Absence of elles – For a majority of Quebec French speakers, elles is not used for the third person plural pronoun, at least in the nominative case; it is replaced with the subject pronoun ils [i] or the stress/tonic pronoun eux(-autres). However, 'elles' is still used in other cases (ce sont elles qui vont payer le prix).
- -autres In informal registers, the stress/tonic pronouns for the plural subject pronouns have the suffix –autres, pronounced [ou̯t] and written –aut’ in eye dialect. Nous-autres, vous-autres, and eux-autres, also found in Louisiana French, are comparable to the Spanish forms nosotros/as and vosotros/as, though with different usage and meanings.

== Verbs ==
In their syntax and morphology, Quebec French verbs differ very little from the verbs of other regional dialects of French, both formal and informal. The distinctive characteristics of Quebec French verbs are restricted mainly to:

- Regularization
  1. In the present indicative, the forms of aller (to go) are regularized as [vɔ] in all singular persons: je vas, tu vas, il/elle va. Note that in 17th century French, what is today's international standard /vɛ/ in je vais was considered substandard while je vas was the prestige form.
  2. In the present subjunctive of aller, the root is regularized as all- /al/ for all persons. Examples: que j'alle, que tu alles, qu'ils allent, etc. The majority of French verbs, regardless of dialect or standardization, display the same regularization. They therefore use the same root for both the imperfect and the present subjunctive: que je finisse vs. je finissais.
  3. Colloquially, in haïr (to hate), in the present indicative singular forms, the hiatus is found between two different vowels instead of at the onset of the verb's first syllable. This results in the forms: j'haïs, tu haïs, il/elle haït, written with a diaeresis (tréma) and all pronounced with two syllables: /a.i/. The "h" in these forms is silent and does not indicate a hiatus; as a result, je elides with haïs forming j'haïs. All the other forms, tenses, and moods of haïr contain the same hiatus regardless of register. However, in Metropolitan French and in more formal Quebec French, especially in the media, the present indicative singular forms are pronounced as one syllable /ɛ/ and written without a diaeresis: je hais, tu hais, il/elle hait.
- Differentiation
  1. In the present indicative of both formal and informal Quebec French, (s')asseoir (to sit/seat) only uses the vowel /wa/ in stressed roots and /e/ in unstressed roots: je m'assois, tu t'assois, il s'assoit, ils s'assoient but nous nous asseyons, vous vous asseyez. In Metropolitan French, stressed /wa/ and /je/ are in free variation as are unstressed /wa/ and /e/. Note that in informal Quebec French, (s')asseoir is often said as (s')assire.
  2. Quebec French has retained the /ɛ/ ending for je/tu/il-elle/ils in the imperfect (the ending is written as -ais, -ait, -aient). In most other dialects, the ending is pronounced, instead, as a neutralized sound between /e/ and /ɛ/.
  3. Informal ils jousent (they play) is sometimes heard for ils jouent and is most likely due to an analogy with ils cousent (they sew). Because of the stigma attached to "ils jousent," most people now use the normative ils jouent, which is free of stigma.

== See also ==
- Association québécoise de linguistique
- Demographics of Quebec
- Franco-Ontarian
- Franglais
- French language in Canada
- French phonology
- Gender-neutral language in French
- History of French
- Québécois
- Quebec English
- Quebec French lexicon
- Quebec French phonology
- Quebec French profanity
- Bill 104, Quebec
