= American French =

Collective term for French varieties of North America

American French (French: le français d'Amérique) is a collective term used for the varieties of the French language that are spoken in North America, which include:

- Canadian French
  - Quebec French
    - Joual
  - Ontario French
  - Métis French
  - Acadian French
    - Chiac
    - St. Marys Bay French
  - Brayon
  - Newfoundland French
- in the United States:
  - Frenchville French
  - Louisiana French
  - Missouri French
  - Muskrat French
  - New England French (a variety of Canadian French spoken in New England)
- Haitian French
- Saint-Barthélemy French
- Saint Pierre and Miquelon French

== See also ==
- Americans in France
- Francophonie
- French-based creole languages
  - French Guianese Creole
  - Haitian Creole
  - Karipúna French Creole
  - Louisiana Creole
  - Michif
- French America
- French Americans
- French language in Canada
- French language in the United States
  - French language in Minnesota
- Varieties of French

== Bibliography ==
- Robert Fournier & Henri Wittmann, éd., Le français des Amériques, Presses Universitaires de Trois-Rivières, 1995 ISBN 2-9802307-2-3.
- Patrice Brasseur, éd., Français d'Amérique: variation, créolisation, normalisation, Centre d'Études canadiennes, Université d'Avignon, 1998 ISBN 2-9511963-0-X.
- Henri Wittmann, «Le français populaire de Paris dans le français des Amériques», Proceedings of the International Congress of Linguists 16.0416 (Paris, 20-25 juillet 1997), Oxford, Pergamon (CD edition).
- Hubert Mansion, 101 mots à sauver du français d'Amérique, Michel Brulé, 2008 ISBN 978-2-89485-403-7.
