= New England French =

French variety of New England, US

- français de Nouvelle-Angleterre
- Native to: United States (New England) (primarily Maine, New Hampshire, and Vermont)
- Native speakers: 170,000 (2015) (Note: Including all dialects of French spoken in New England, except French Creole)
- Language family: Indo-European: Italic; Latino-Faliscan; Latinic; Romance; Italo-Western; Western; Gallo-Iberian; Gallo-Romance; Gallo-Rhaetian?; Arpitan–Oïl; Oïl; Francien zone; French; Canadian French; New England French
- Early forms: Old Latin: Vulgar Latin; Proto-Romance; Old Gallo-Romance; Old French; Middle French; Canadian French

Language codes
- ISO 639-3: –
- Glottolog: None
- Linguasphere: 51-AAA-iid
- Percentage of population speaking French at home, including other dialects but excluding French-based creoles (2015) 10–15% 5–10% 1–5% 0.5-1% Speakers by total population Population speaking French at home, including other dialects (2015) >15000 10000-15000 5000-10000 2500-5000 1000-2500 500-1000 <500

New England French (French: français de Nouvelle-Angleterre) is a variety of French spoken in the New England region of the United States. It descends from Canadian French because it originally came from French Canadians who immigrated to New England during the Grande Hémorragie.

New England French is one of the major forms of the French language that developed in what is now the United States, the others being Louisiana French and the nearly extinct Missouri French, Muskrat French and Métis French. The dialect is the predominant form of French spoken in New England (apart from standard French), except in the Saint John Valley of northern Aroostook County, Maine, where Brayon French predominates.

The dialect is endangered. After the First World War, laws were instituted banning immersive bilingual teaching outside of dedicated foreign-language classes, and during the 1960s and 1970s some public schools disciplined students for speaking French in school; however, in recent years it has seen renewed interest and is supported by bilingual education programs in place since 1987. A continuing trend of reduced bilingual and foreign-language education has affected the language's prevalence in younger generations. However, cultural programs in recent years have led to renewed interest among older generations speaking the dialect, and the language has also been bolstered by newly arrived refugee populations from Francophone Africa in cities such as Lewiston.

== History ==
=== Early history ===
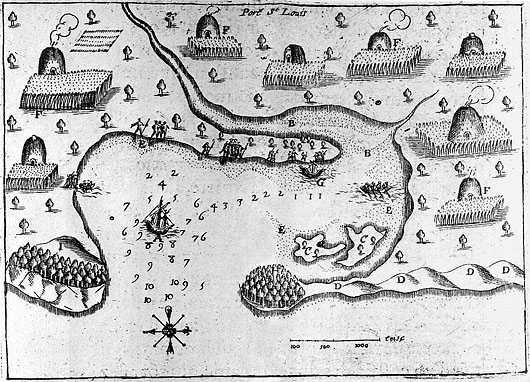
1605 map of Plymouth Harbor and its natives, by French colonist and geographer Samuel de Champlain, creator of the first accurate coastal map of the Maritimes and New England

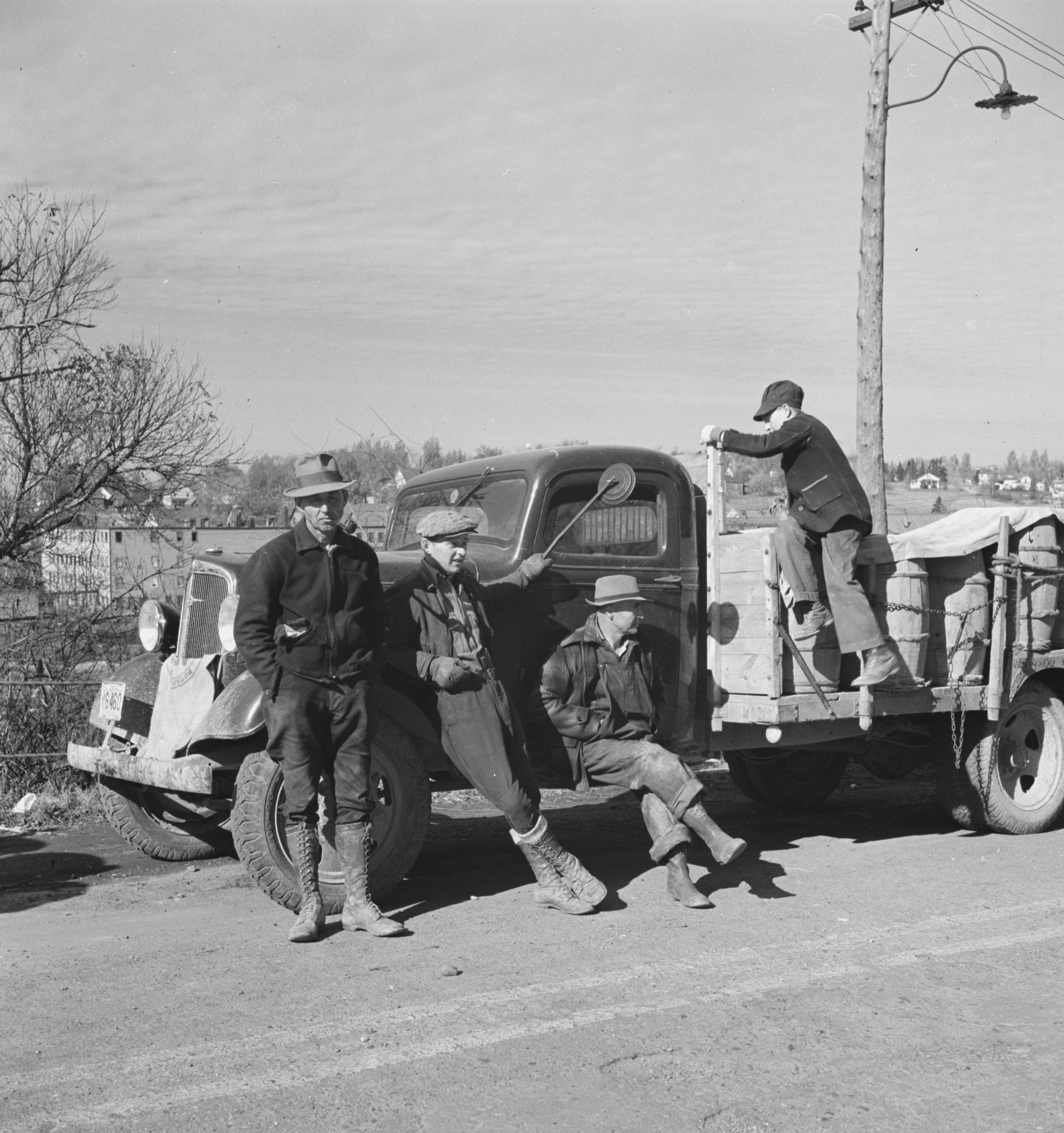
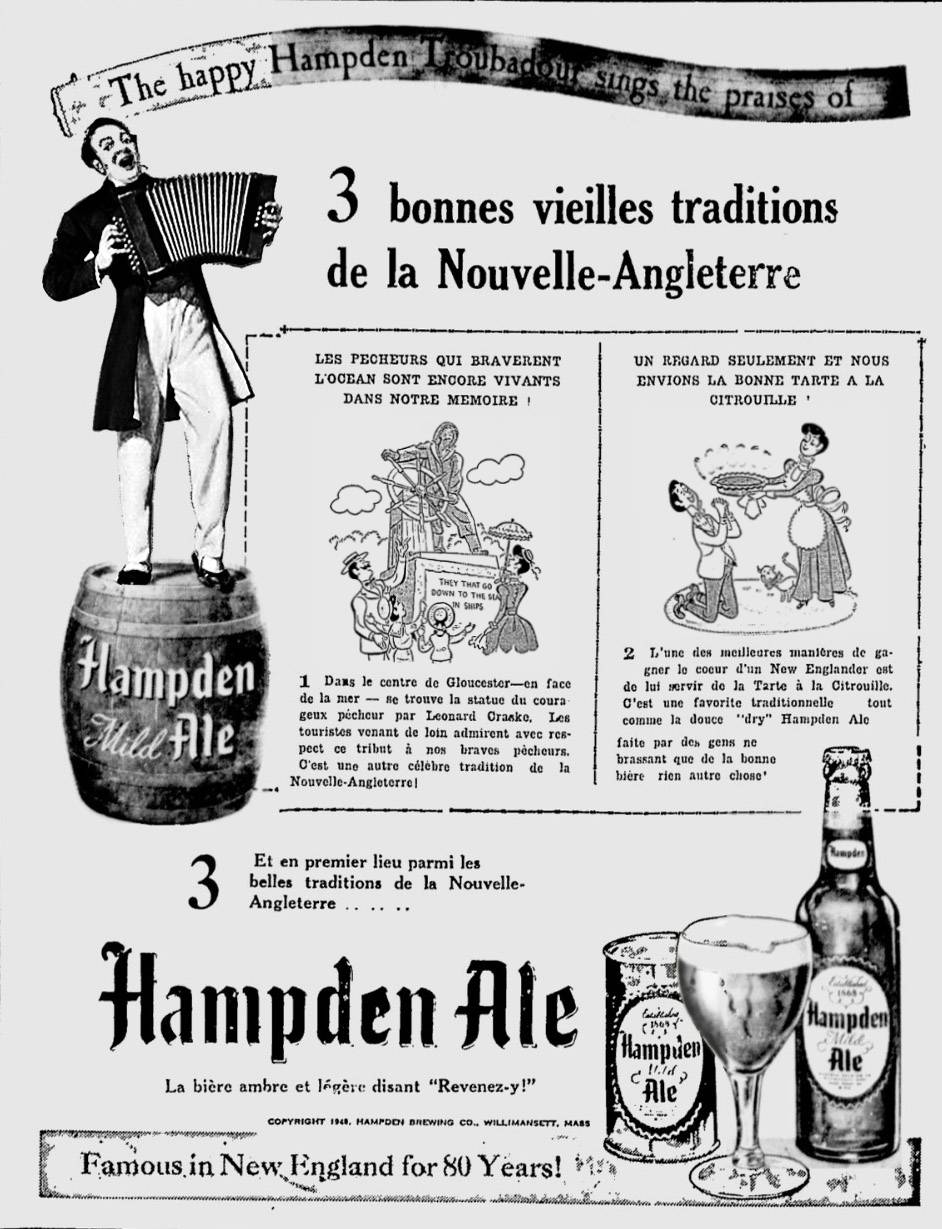
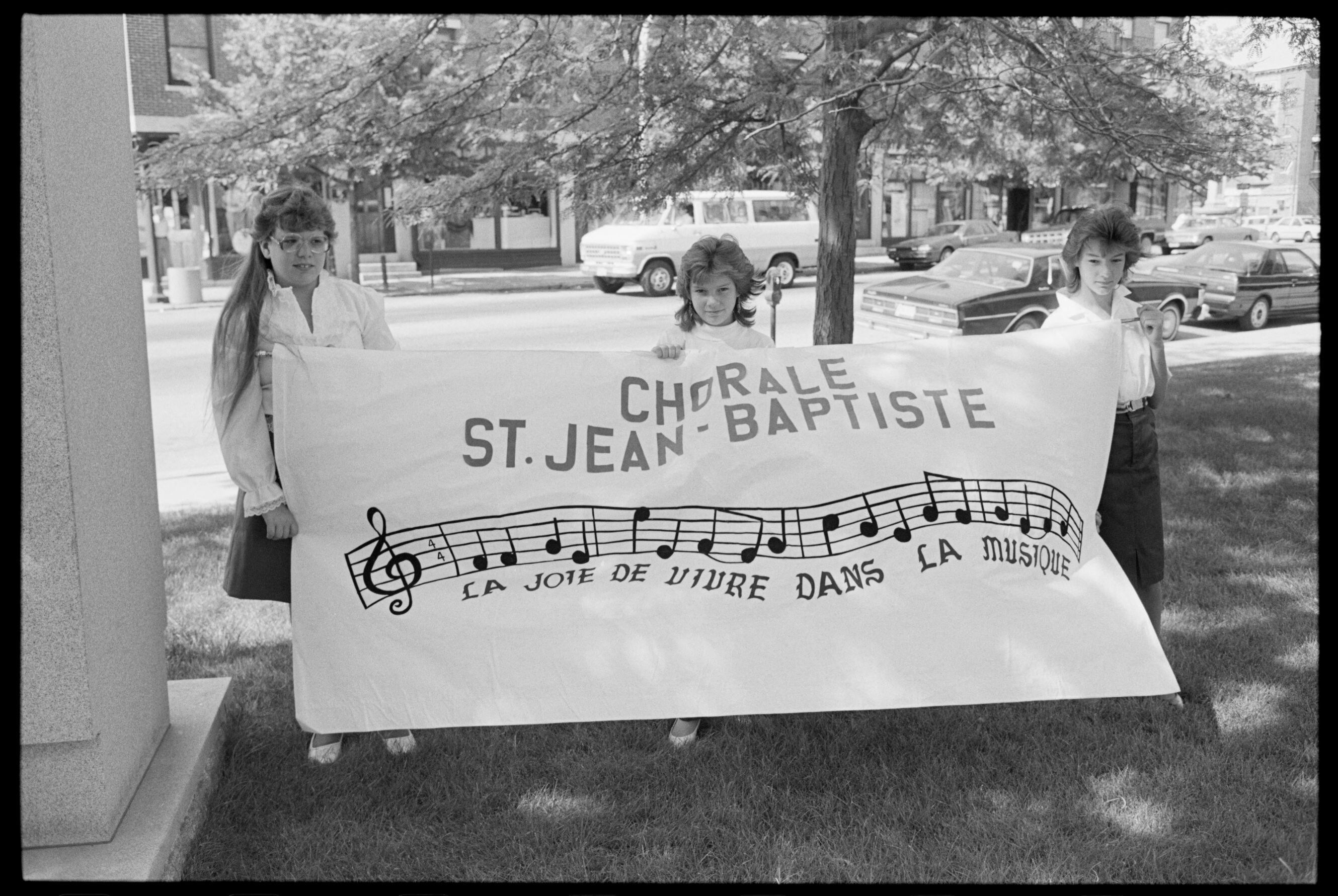
Top to bottom: French-Canadian American potato farmers in Caribou, Maine (1940); a bilingual ad for Hampden Ale (1948); three girls holding a banner for Lowell's Chorale St. Jean-Baptiste (1986)

Dating back to the earliest colonial period, a French presence remained in New England with its proximity to Quebec, even after many Acadians were exiled in Le Grand Dérangement and later settled in Spanish Louisiana. Although the French and Indian War would leave distance between the Yankee and Franco settlers, the role of France in the American Revolution as well as the contributions of French military figures like Rochambeau in the Siege of Yorktown, engendered an alliance against Loyalists at that time.

Early figures from French stock who would become a part of the American narrative included Peter Faneuil, Gov. James Bowdoin, and Paul Revere, all descendants of Huguenots who fled persecution to the New World. However, while Faneuil and Bowdoin both spoke fluently, the latter encouraged his son James Bowdoin III to learn the language, but was described as decidedly pro-British after the Revolution, for his disdain at France's reversion of the Edict of Nantes. In contrast, born to a French household, Revere (anglicized from Rivoire) only spoke the English of the Bay Province, though he had family who spoke the French language in Boston and overseas, and would correspond with them, having replies translated for him.

The French language remained extant in Boston during its time as a British colony, though not abundant, one reason being a fear of the influence of Catholicism; academically this prevented the language from gaining early acceptance at Harvard, when its first instructor was dismissed in 1735, after two years of teaching, due to rumors of converting students from Protestantism. Six decades later, one of the first publishers of a French textbook in the Americas was Harvard's first salaried French instructor, Joseph Nancrède, who compiled then-contemporary French texts and published them alongside limited English translations in his L'Abeille Françoise in 1792. Years before, in 1789, Nancrède established the first French newspaper of Boston, a short-lived weekly published for six months that year which he described in its prospectus as a means to foster commerce between the Americans and French-speaking world, and "to convey adequate ideas of the Majesty of Congress to nations who scarcely know that there is one existing."

Outside of Boston, prior to the Industrial Revolution and the Second Industrial Revolution, the influence of French settlers in New England was diminished almost entirely following the end of the French and Indian War and the 1763 Treaty of Paris, which gave control of the region to the British. During this time many of Vermont's earliest settlers returned to Quebec; however, the Vermont Archaeological Society has noted in the past that a small number of French remained settled, at farms too remote to meet the notice of the fledgling colonial government. Similarly, Maine was claimed by the French to the east of the Kennebec River, and during the expulsion of the Acadians, French culture largely left that landscape as well.

Prior to the Great Migration of the Québécois during the Second Industrial Revolution, one of the earliest examples of New England French arose from the Papineau Rebellion in Lower Canada. Following the rebellion, Ludger Duvernay, one of the 26 patriot leaders arrested by Canadian authorities for printing articles critical of the British colonial government, went into exile in the States. Formerly publishing La Minerve in Montreal, he issued a prospectus for a French-language paper in 1838, hoping Americans would support a journal that promoted civil rights and independence in Lower Canada. He set up in Burlington, Vermont, what was described as the first French-Canadian American newspaper, publishing the first issue of Le Patriote Canadien on August 7, 1839, for both Canadians across the border and a patriot community in the United States.

=== The Great Migration ===
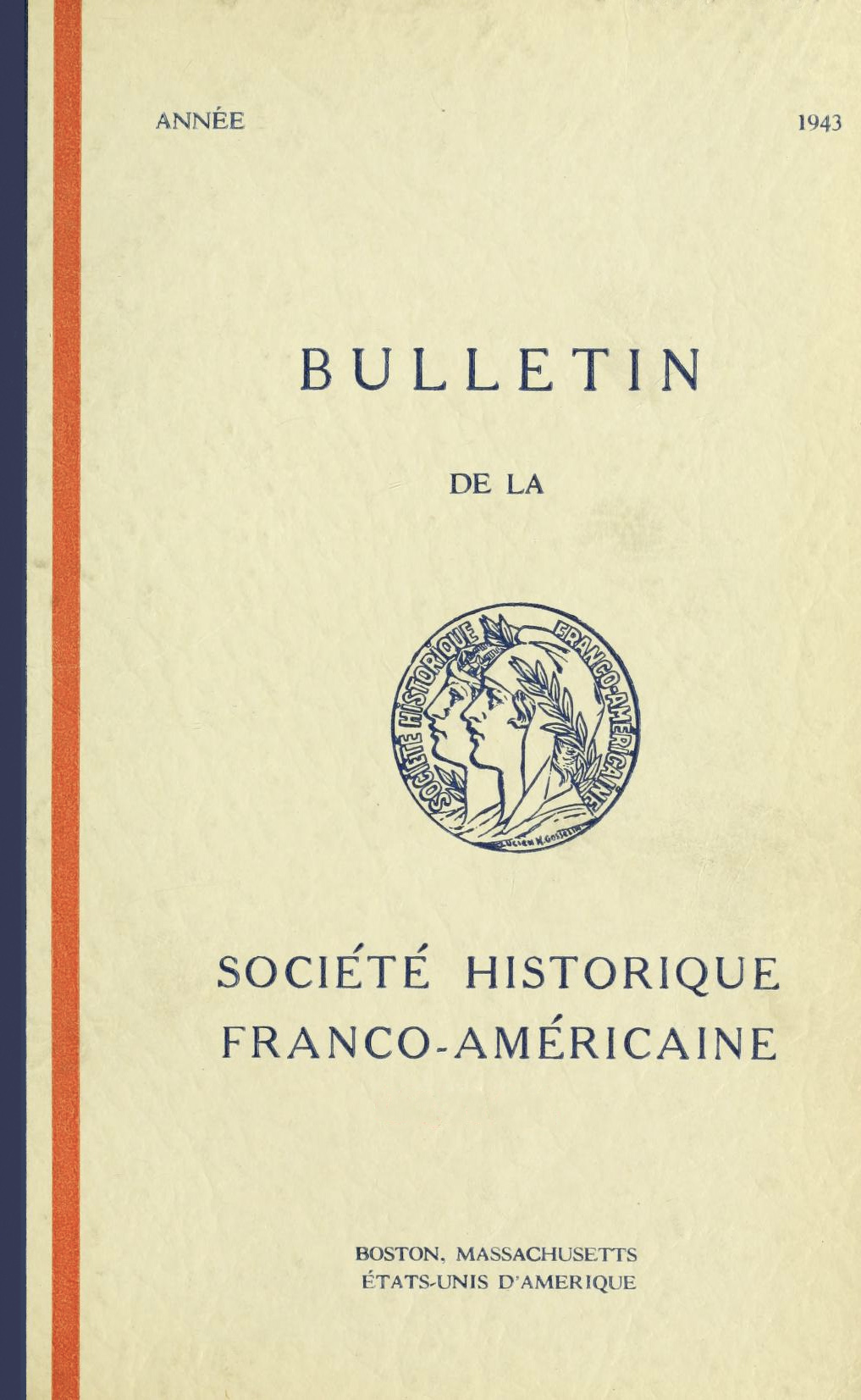
The Bulletin de la Société Historique Franco-américaine for 1943, one of many institution created from La Survivance

Beginning in the late 1840s, greater numbers of French Canadians began to settle in the States, at first for seasonal agricultural jobs, and then eventually brought in by horse and later train, to serve as factory workers for the large mill towns being built by the Boston Associates and others all across the six New England states. By 1899 there were reportedly 120 French-language parishes in New England, and by that time of the 1.5 million people of French-speaking Canada, about 600,000 had migrated to the U.S., primarily to New England. To a degree these newcomers integrated and learned the English language; however, La Survivance also endured. On the eve of the Chinese Exclusion Act, in 1881 Carroll D. Wright described the newly-arrived French as the "Chinese of the Eastern States" for their refusal to entirely integrate, the use of their labor by mill owners to subvert union wages, and the creation of separate French-language institutions. This statement would serve as a flashpoint of controversy for decades, but others in the Yankee political class would welcome the newcomers, with Senator Henry Cabot Lodge remarking in a 1908 immigration speech to the Boston City Club that they "represent one of the oldest settlements on this continent. They have been, in the broad sense, Americans for generations, and their coming to the United States is merely a movement of Americans across an imaginary line." Industrial cities as large as Fall River, Massachusetts, and as small as Somersworth, New Hampshire, would often have bilingual signs, and American customs such as baseball gradually adopted by younger generations had their own francized jargon, with it being as common for a muff (Note: An error by an outfielder in failing to catch an easy play.) to be met with an outcry of "sacré nom" by spectators.

One of the earliest examples of New England French being differentiated from Canadian French and Acadian French came in an 1898 study in Johns Hopkins University's Modern Language Notes, noting variants of phonology, and studies would continue sporadically covering vocabulary into the late 20th century. By 1924, approximately 1.5 million people, regardless of origin, spoke French in New England, (Note: It is unclear if this represents native fluency or fluency as a second-language.) which at the 1920 US Census was recorded at 7.4 million residents, placing the proportion of French speakers at about one-fifth of the population, or nearly the same proportion as that of French speakers in Canada in 2016.

=== Historical newspapers ===
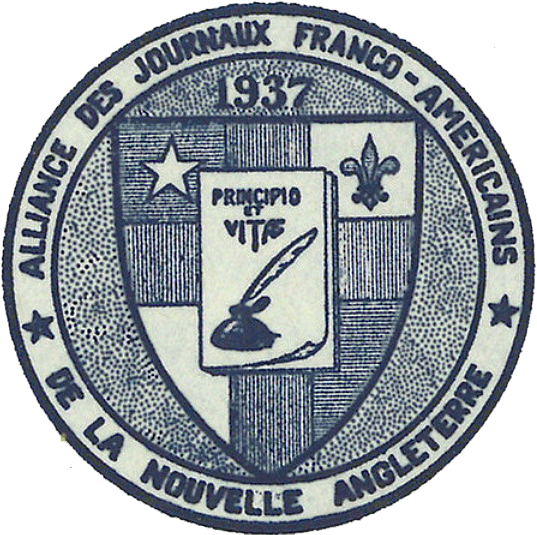
Seal of the Alliance des Journaux Franco-Américains de la Nouvelle Angleterre, a trade organization of French-language newspapers in New England extant from 1937 to 1963.

A map showing a total of 242 Franco-American newspapers published in New England in the French language, extant for some period between the years 1838 and 1938.

During the late 19th through mid-20th centuries, the dialect was supported with more than 250 French newspapers extant in New England, many being published weekly and only seeing publication for a few years, while some would endure from the late 1800s and early 1900s into the interwar period, with 21 newspapers and four monthlies in existence in 1937, and a handful publishing through the 1960s, such as Le Messager in Lewiston, Maine, L'Indépendant in Fall River, Massachusetts, and La Justice in Holyoke, Massachusetts. However, competition with the daily English press, a lack of public support from non-speakers, and the availability of larger Quebec publications like La Presse in Montreal led to a gradual decline of the New England French newspaper trade. In one 1936 editorial in the Woonsocket L'Union, the editorship described an apathy that had set in with the French community in response to an increase in advertising for financial support- (Note: Original in French: "Notre presse réussit à peine à se maintenir...Un de nos hebdomadaires vient encore d'expirer; d'autres vivent presque exclusivement des annonces; plusieurs n'obtiennent que blâme et dénigrement en retour de la publicité gratuite qu'ils donnent aux œuvres franco-américaines...C'est surtous l'hostilité, l'apathie, l'indifférence des Franco-Américains qui empêchent nos journaux d'atteindre la perfection...Leurs défauts proviennent de leur impuissance relative bien plus que de leur incompétence")

"Our press is barely able to maintain itself ... One of our weeklies has just expired; others live almost exclusively on ads; many get only blame and denigration in return for the free publicity they give to Franco-American works ... It's all the hostility, the apathy, the indifference of Franco-Americans that prevent our newspapers from achieving perfection ... Their defects come from their relative helplessness rather than from their incompetence."

Many of these ads would increasingly appear in English, and changing mediums like radio, as well as a frustration with the helpless financial situation leading to more ads only aggravated the decline. One exception to this was Lewiston's Le Messager, whose publisher-owner, Jean-Baptiste Couture, founded central Maine's first, and New England's only radio station owned by a Franco-American weekly, WCOU, in 1938. The bilingual WCOU would outlive the paper, broadcasting regular French programming through at least 1972. A few newspapers were able to retain a readership beyond the 1960s independently. This included Le Travailleur, a Worcester French-language weekly that folded in 1978 which, in its final years, could hardly be described as in the tradition of its predecessors, as it was mainly syndicated news from France. During a period of revival in preserving New England French in academia and civics, the Ligue des Sociétés de Langue Française ("League of French Language Societies") in Lewiston launched its monthly L'Unité, which published from 1976 through 1984. The only New England French news outlet to endure into the emergence of the internet was Le Journal de Lowell; founded in 1975, the monthly paper would continue to produce French-language content, including the translation of English ads, until December 1995, when it abruptly ceased publication.

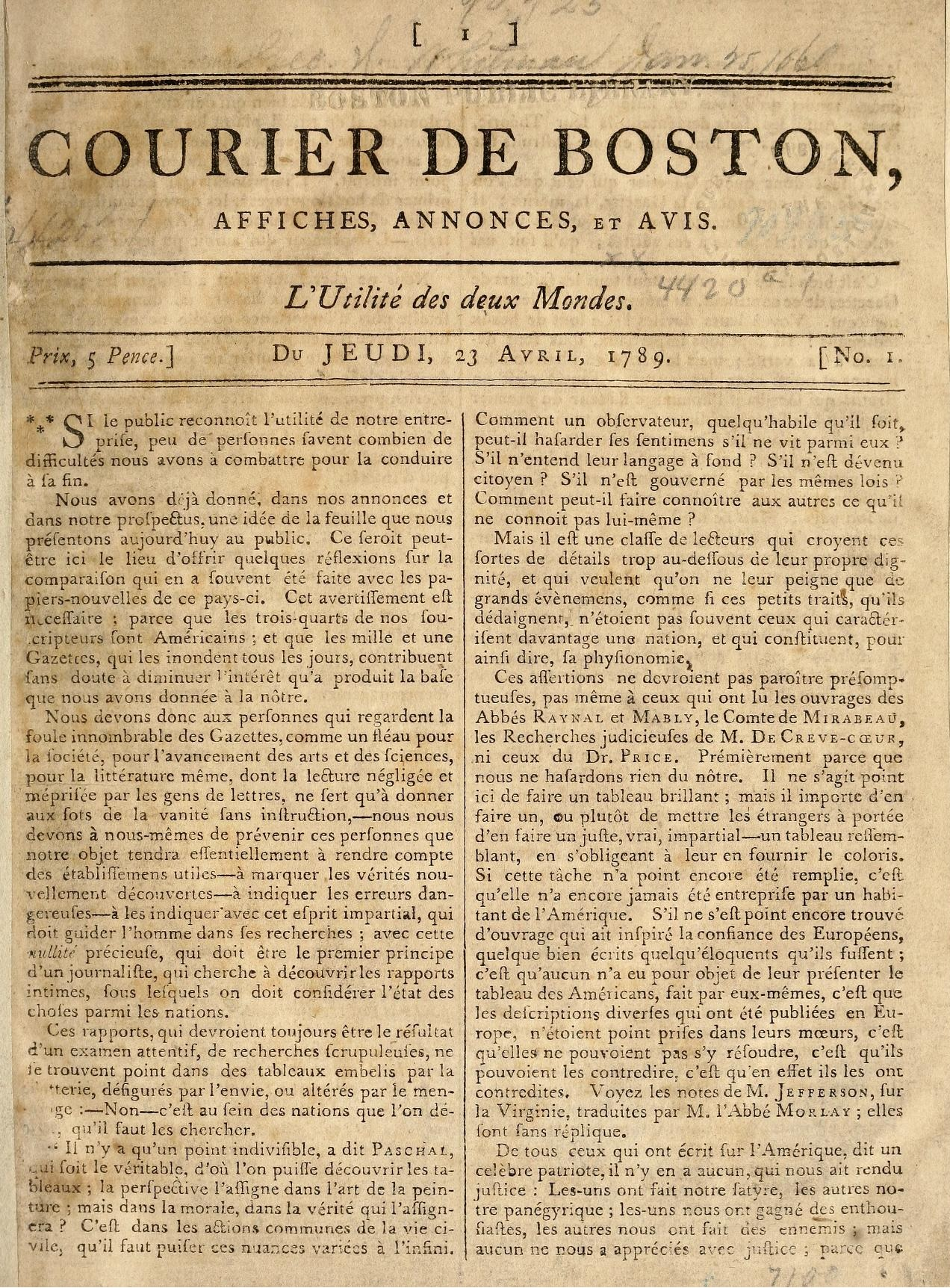
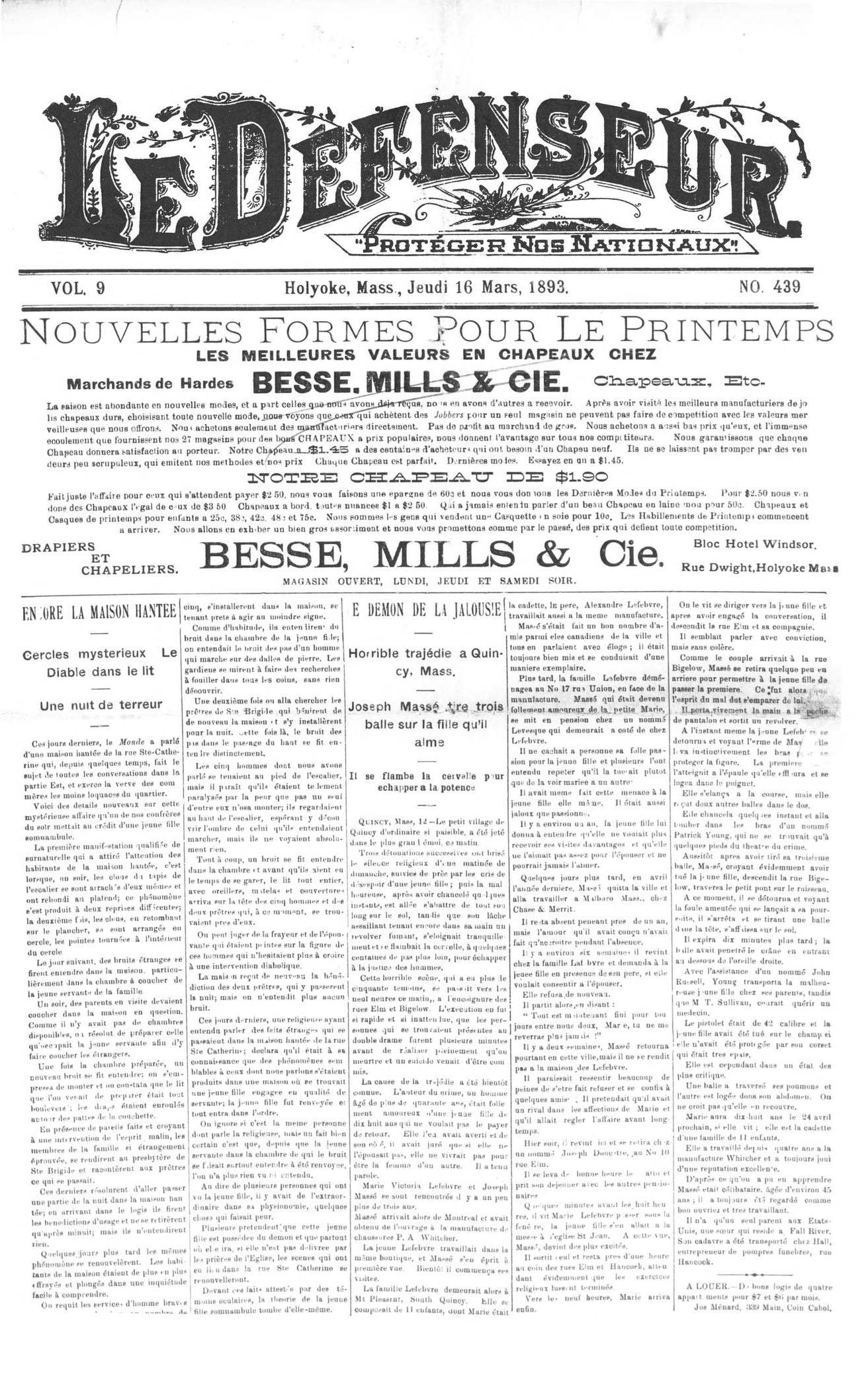
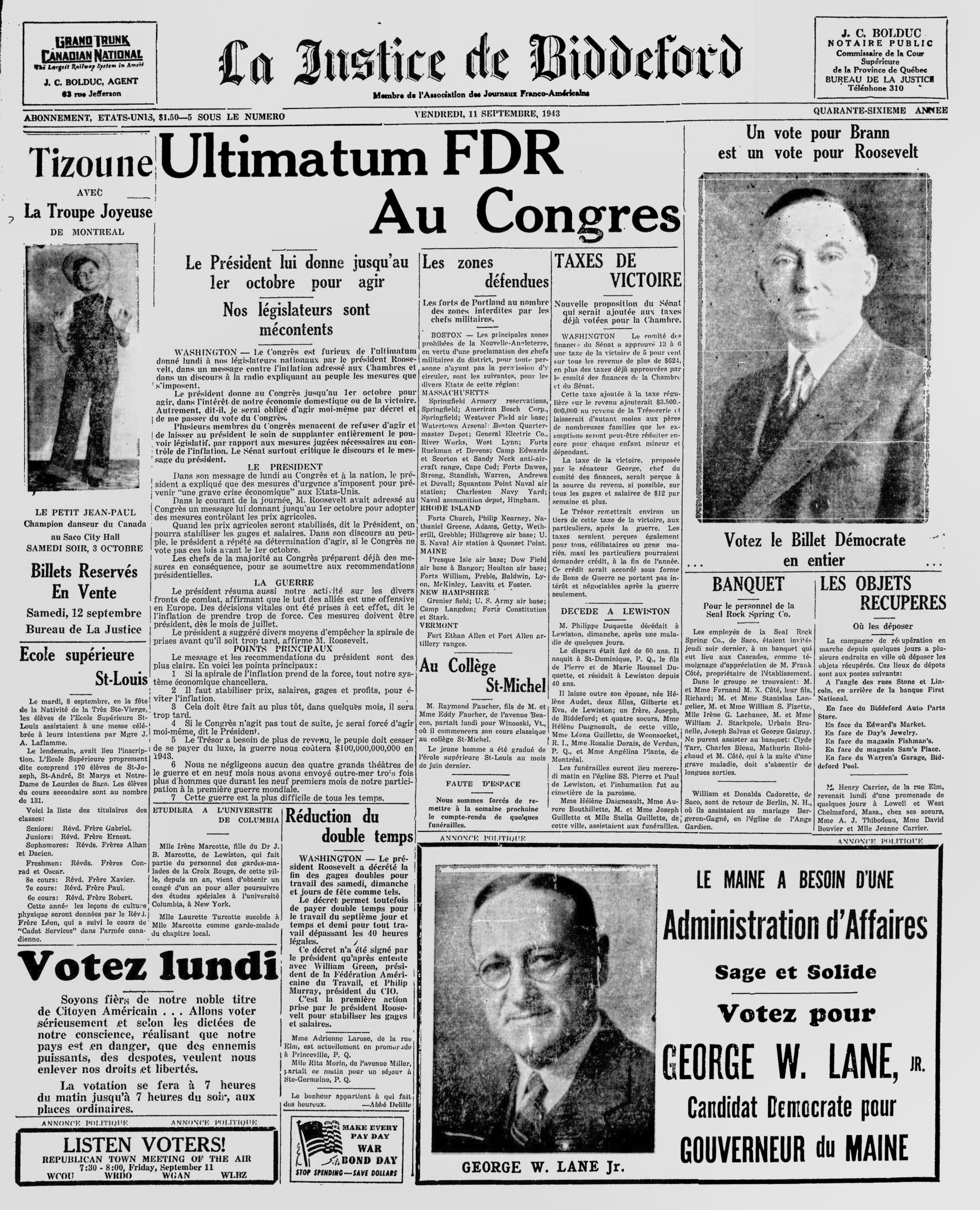
Left to right: The Courier de Boston, published in 1789, was the city's first French newspaper, coverage including George Washington's inaugural speech in French and English in its May 14, 1789 issue; an 1893 issue of Le Défenseur, a Holyoke French weekly extant from 1884 to 1894; a 1942 issue of La Justice de Biddeford, published from 1896 to about 1950

=== Decline ===
A combination of cultural and economic forces would drive a decline in the use of the French language in New England through the end of the 20th century. Attitudes varied among Anglophone Yankees. During a speech in 1891 in Boston, Canadian Prime Minister Wilfrid Laurier urged a French-Canadian audience, "One of the things that is absolutely essential is to study the English language, the language of [this] country...most of you, if you are now over a million on this side of the 45th line, you have not come for any other object than that of earning your daily bread. So, while not losing the memory of your origin, remember that you have duties to fulfill as citizens of the Republic and that you must love your adopted homeland." (Note: Original in French:[I]l y a une chose qui est tout a fait indispensable, c'est d'etudier la langue anglaise, la langue du pays... Car, apres tout, la grande chose s'est d'abord de gagner le pain de chaque jour; et si vous etes etablis sur le sol americain, la plupart d'entre vous, si vouts etes maintenant au dela d'un million de ce cote-ci de la ligne 45ieme, vous n'y etes pas venus pour d'autre object que celui de gagner votre pain quotidien. Ainsi, tout en ne perdant pas le souvenir de votre origine, souvenez-vous que vous avez des devoirs a remplir comme citoyens de la Republique et que vous devez aimer votre patrie d'adoption.)

While a sense of civic solidarity with Americans was expressed by Laurier and other French-American and Canadian leaders, economic discrimination also disfavored New England French speakers. Not unlike the exclusion some Francophones in Louisiana would witness, attitudes towards French speakers in New England would also result in disparate outcomes. In a 1983 study by the US Commission on Civil Rights, a Vermont committee found that though the French language was spoken by a large part of its population, they often held disparately lower wealth and educational outcomes than monolingual English-speaking peers, with few resources given to bilingual education. The committee would attribute this in part to the Americanization Department of the US Bureau of Education program, begun in 1919, requiring all students to be taught in English alone, prompting laws in Rhode Island, Maine, and New Hampshire prohibiting immersive teaching, requiring only English in classes not specifically dedicated to foreign language. Connecticut and Vermont would both see bills introduced for preventing the use of French in Catholic schools, but neither would pass their legislatures. A consequence of those laws that were enacted however, were that entire communities where only French was spoken were subject to scrutiny by the state. A threat of penalty or termination of funding for speaking French outside of French classes led to measures in Maine which suppressed the language. Most notably, children were often asked to refrain from speaking anything but English when state officials were present, leading to "silent playgrounds" during days schools were being inspected.

In turn, as the economy of Canada improved, a number of those whose families had moved to the United States would return to Quebec, Ontario, and New Brunswick, as well, into the latter half of the 20th century.

=== Preservation efforts ===
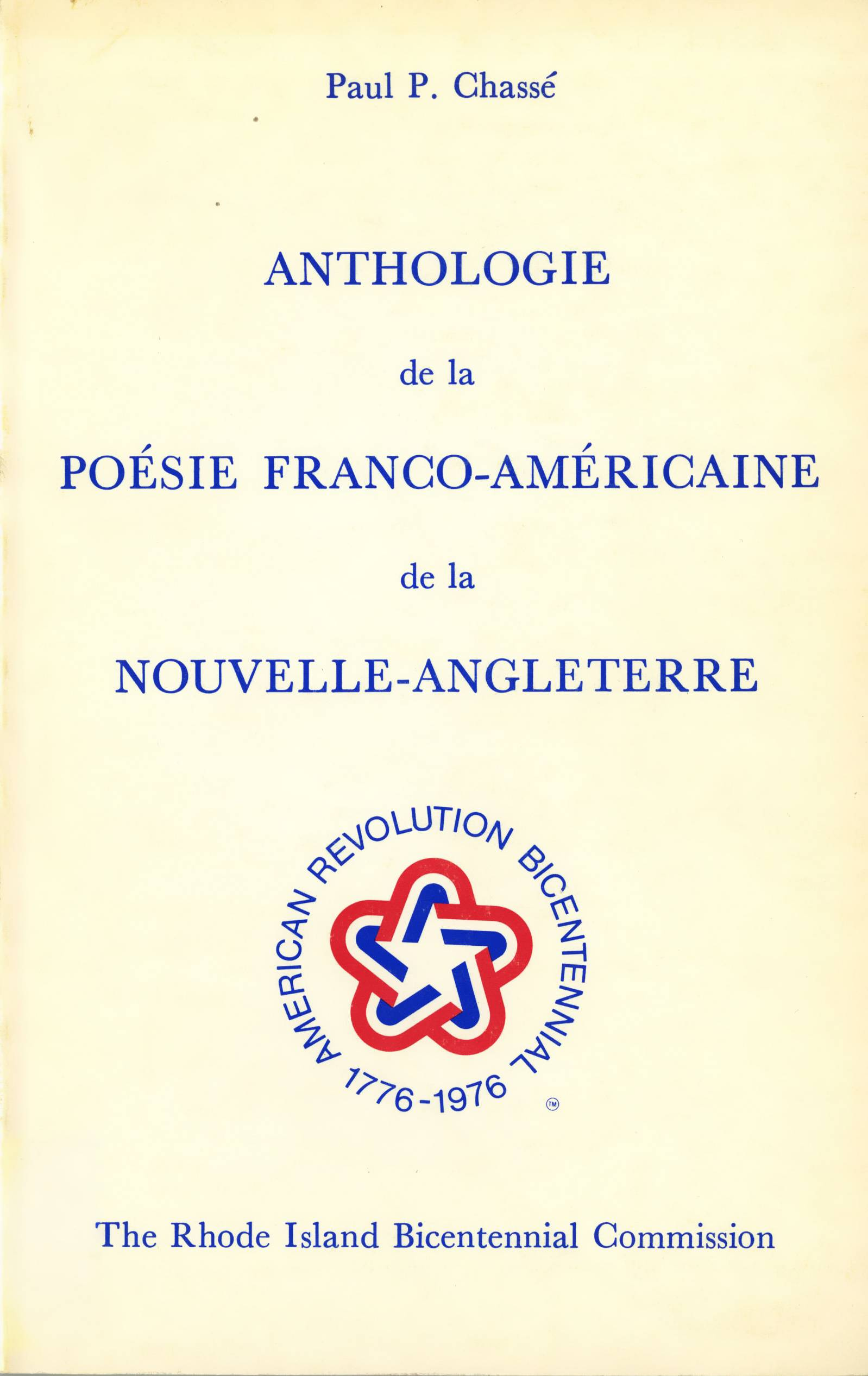
Anthologie de la poésie Franco-Américaine de la Nouvelle-Angleterre, compiled by Paul Chassé for the American Bicentennial, represents the most complete collection of Franco-American poetry, with most works in New England French.

A decline in the French language was evident by the mid-20th century, with Joseph Ubalde-Paquin, a president of the Société Historique Franco-Américaine, noting during the 2nd Congress of the French Language in Boston in 1937 (2e Congrès de la Langue française), that "the Franco-Americans always speak valiantly the French Language, but the French spirit disappears from their families; their children think in English and therefore speak more easily in the English language." Paquin went on to urge families to francize their prayer and song, so future generations "may serve as an extension of ourselves and our ancestors". (Note: Original in French: Ce soir, après vingt-cinq ans, nous pouvons dire à notre tour: les Franco-Américains parlent toujours vaillamment la Langue française, mais l'esprit français disparit de leurs familles; leurs enfants pensent en anglais et par conséquent, s'expriment plus facilement dans la Langue anglaise. Le Deuxieme Congrès devra marquer le commencement d'une ère nouvelle. Esperons que les campagnes d'idées qui le precedent, l'agitation des esprits, les sentiments qu'auront fait germer dans nos coeurs les missionnaires de la pensé française qui nous visitent, nous inciteront comme chefs de famille, à prendre la ferme résolution de franciser l'atmosphere de nos prière et la chanson, afin que nos enfants ressentent le besoin de parler français et d'être le prolongement de nous-mêmes et de nos aïeux.) Such groups, organized at a national and international level in New England, represented more than gatherings of Franco-Americans, but rather other speakers of the French language as well. For example, a 1938 reception for René Doynel de Saint-Quentin saw representation from Louisiana and from Boston's Syro-Lebanais community. In 1938 as well, New Englanders saw representation at the Second Congress on the French Language in Canada (Deuxième Congrès de la langue française au Canada), which included resolutions to establish 12 survivance committees in the New England states, promoting press, cultural institutions and similar. To some degree a Comité de la Survivance française en Amérique would remain active into the 1950s, while meetings of the Société Historique Franco-Américaine would continue in cooperation with other French-speaking communities through the 1980s.

In 2012 the state of Maine, one of two states (along with Vermont) where French was the second-most spoken language, created a Franco-American Task Force to evaluate the current status of the language among Franco-Americans in Maine. Among its findings were that of this population, only 12.3% over the age of 5, about 40,000 individuals, spoke French. Some 98.5% of these Franco-Americans had been born in the United States, indicating the persistence of New England French. Nevertheless, the report concluded the French language was no longer inherently part of French-American identity. As part of this effort, in 2012 Maine launched an immersive Maine French Heritage Language Program, designed to have at least four in five classes conducted in French, catering to both the New England dialect and those of immigrants and refugees. However, this program was cut by 2014, when the French Department of the University of Southern Maine, providing program curricula, was closed entirely. By 2019, the decline had not seen any changes in trend despite the language's centuries-old presence in the state. Even with renewed bilingualism initiatives, a lack of support for foreign-language programs and a shortage of teachers, as well as the stigmatism of the previous English-only laws were blamed in part for a lack of knowledge in French in Maine's youngest generation.

The Massachusetts American and French Canadian Cultural Exchange Commission, though not strictly a linguistic body like Louisiana's CODOFIL, maintains, and develops cultural ties between French-Canadians and Franco-Americans, as well as a number of Francophone organizations.

Although not taught strictly in the New England dialect, in recent years new efforts have arisen to preserve the language, with a Maine chapter of the Alliance Française established in Portland in August 2019, adding to others in Hartford, Providence, Greater Burlington, the Centre Franco-Americain in Manchester, and the French Cultural Center in Boston. The New England dialect, and some of the vocabulary and mannerisms that characterize it, not unlike Acadian, Canadian, and Cajun French, however, have faced less institutional support, in favor of Standard French. A number of smaller local cultural and language preservation groups remain extant, including Le Comité Franco-Américain de Lowell and L'Association Francophone de Fall River in Massachusetts.

While not approached from a preservation standpoint, in recent years a "French Friendly" policy has been adopted through the Northern Border Regional Commission by the state of New Hampshire and its chambers of commerce, and Burlington, Vermont, providing training for service industry employees to provide Canadian French service to a substantial French-Canadian tourist demographic.

== Population ==
As the French language is differentiated only from French Creole in US Census Bureau figures, this provides an estimate of the French-speaking population but speakers of the dialect are not enumerated specifically. According to the 2016 American Community Survey, in total there were about 160,000 residents in New England who spoke some form of the language at home, with the highest population in Massachusetts, and the highest per capita residential population in Maine. By county, the 2015 American Community Survey showed the highest populations of French speakers in Middlesex County, Massachusetts, with 16,593 household speakers, and Hartford County, Connecticut, with 11,620. Per capita, the only county with more than 10% of residents speaking any form of French at home was Aroostook County, Maine (9,800 or 14.6%), due to its geographic proximity to Canada and speakers of Acadian and Quebec French. Coos County, New Hampshire (2,923 or 9.6%), Androscoggin County, Maine (8,913 or 8.8%) and Essex County, Vermont (374 or 6.3%) were the only other counties with more than 5% of the population speaking French, with Androscoggin County, home to Lewiston, Maine, being the sole county not bordering Canada with such a proportion of speakers.

=== French speakers by state ===
The figures below include speakers of any French dialect, as estimated during the 2012-2016 American Community Survey:

State	French name	Number of speakers	Percent French-speaking
Maine	Maine	38,695	3.06%
New Hampshire	Nouveau Hampshire	21,260	1.68%
Vermont	Vert Mont	8,508	1.43%
Rhode Island	Île Rhode	9,382	0.94%
Massachusetts	Massachusetts	54,710	0.86%
Connecticut	Connecticut	25,828	0.76%

=== Francophone communities ===
French language spoken at home by more than 10% of the population, as estimated for the 2011-2015 American Community Survey:

Community	French name	State	Percent French-speaking	Total population of community (2010 census)
Frenchville	Ville-Française	Maine	67.4%	1,087
Hamlin	Hamlin	Maine	62.8%	219
Grand Isle	Grande Île	Maine	62.6%	467
Madawaska	Madawaska	Maine	61.8%	4,035
Dennistown Plantation	Plantation de Dennistown	Maine	59.3%	30
St. Agatha	Sainte-Agathe	Maine	56.6%	747
Van Buren	Van Buren	Maine	56.5%	2,171
Cyr Plantation	Plantation Cyr	Maine	55.9%	103
Fort Kent	Fort-Kent	Maine	47.5%	4,097
Wallagrass	Wallagrass	Maine	46.9%	546
St. John Plantation	Plantation de Saint-Jean	Maine	44.2%	267
New Canada	Nouveau-Canada	Maine	40.7%	321
Eagle Lake	Lac Aigle	Maine	40.1%	864
Winterville Plantation	Plantation de la Ville d'hiver	Maine	39.0%	224
St. Francis	Saint-François	Maine	38.2%	485
Ferdinand	Ferdinand	Vermont	30.0%	32
Norton	Norton	Vermont	24.2%	169
Canaan	Canaan	Vermont	22.8%	972
Clarksville	Ville de Clark	New Hampshire	17.2%	265
Berlin	Berlin	New Hampshire	16.7%	10,051
Stewartstown	Stewartstown	New Hampshire	16.0%	1,004
Portage Lake	Lac Portage	Maine	15.7%	391
Lewiston	Lewiston	Maine	14.7%	36,592
Caswell	Caswell	Maine	14.7%	306
Milan	Milan	New Hampshire	13.6%	1,337
Errol	Errol	New Hampshire	13.1%	291
Sabattus	Sabattus	Maine	12.9%	4,876
Dummer	Dummer	New Hampshire	12.2%	304
Wentworth Location	Emplacement de Wentworth	New Hampshire	12.1%	33
Averill	Averill	Vermont	11.1%	24
Lyman	Lyman	Maine	10.1%	4,344

== Vocabulary ==
Interview in New England French with a New Hampshire resident discussing common criticisms of the dialect, as well as the mélange of others spoken in the northern New England states, 2015

Although many variations of French are spoken by populations within New England, including Quebec, Acadian, and European French, a 1961 speaking study conducted by the United States Department of Health, Education, and Welfare found a number of features of the New England dialect that were prevalent in the mid-20th century. Some colloquialisms found in New England French are similar to rural Quebec French with the use of words like char (roughly, "chariot"), compared with the standard French word for car, voiture ("vehicle", "automobile"), and represent words regarded as archaic in standardized French or words used in other dialects but of similar, yet distinct, usages. When respondents were presented with more advanced Standard French prompts, however, they generally demonstrated comprehension and code switching. Some examples of responses provided in the study and other regional literature include:

English	Standard French	Laurentian French	New England French
bottleneck	goulot	goulot	gougeau
corn	maïs	blé d'Inde	blé d'Inde
car	voiture	voiture/auto/char	char
dollar	dollar	dollar/piastre	piastre
heavy	lourd	lourd/pesant	pesant
midwife	sage-femme	sage-femme	baboche
mirror	miroir	miroir	glace
now	maintenant	maintenant/astheure	astheure (Note: Contraction of "à cette heure", also found in Louisiana French and colloquially in Northwest parts of France.)
pineapple	ananas	ananas	pomme de pin
potato	pomme de terre	patate	pétate
strainer	passoire	passoire	tamis
sweeper	balai	balayeuse	balai

=== Code switching in English ===
Given the ubiquity of English in the region as well as the close proximity of French and English speaking groups, oftentimes code switching is used extensively by Franco-American families even when French is not spoken by all members of the household. Many of these words are used as terms of endearment between grandparents referring to their grandchildren, or by their parents, and often picked up by the children themselves, in households of Franco-American families whose youngest generations primarily speak English.

Examples include substitutions as simple as calling grandparents mémère (shortened mémé) or pépère (pépé), while a 1969 study found other more opaque examples, a small sample of which includes:

- baboune (noun), to press one's lips together and outwards in a pouty expression or "duck face". For example- "Don't make a baboune like that, your face will stay that way."
- pépéte (noun), bird, as in "Do you see the little pépétes?"
- quenoeil (noun), eye, as in "Make pretty quenoeils for mémère."
- séssi (verb), sit down, particularly in the context of an exclamation as in "Séssi! You séssi now!"
- matante or mononcle, aunt or uncle

== Media ==
Though not offering weekly or monthly coverage, the New York-based bilingual France-Amérique magazine writes periodic news stories on Francophone community events and institutions in New England. With the exception of Francophone group publications such as the newsletter of Boston Accueil, no regular French periodicals are extant within New England today. In other mediums the language is rarely found, with the exception of Canadian French AM repeaters of Radio-Canada from Quebec, and an online forum maintained by the Organisation internationale de la Francophonie, "Bienvenue à Boston".

== See also ==
- Acadian French
- American French
- Canadian French
- Early Franco-American newspapers
- French in New Hampshire
- French language in Canada
- French language in the United States
- Louisiana French
- New England English
- Ku Klux Klan in Maine
