= Franglais =

Mix of French and English

Franglais (French: [fʁɑ̃ɡlɛ]) or Frenglish (/ˈfrɛŋɡlɪʃ/ FRENG-glish) is a French blend that referred first to the overuse of English words by French speakers and later to diglossia or the macaronic mixture of French (français) and English (anglais).

== Etymology ==
The word Franglais was first attested in French in 1959, but it was popularised by the academic, novelist, and critic René Étiemble in his denunciation of the overuse of English words in French, Parlez-vous franglais? published in 1964. Earlier than the French term was the English label Frenglish, first recorded in 1937. Other colloquial blends for French-influenced English include Franglish (recorded from 1967), Frenchlish (1974), and Fringlish (1982).

== English sense ==
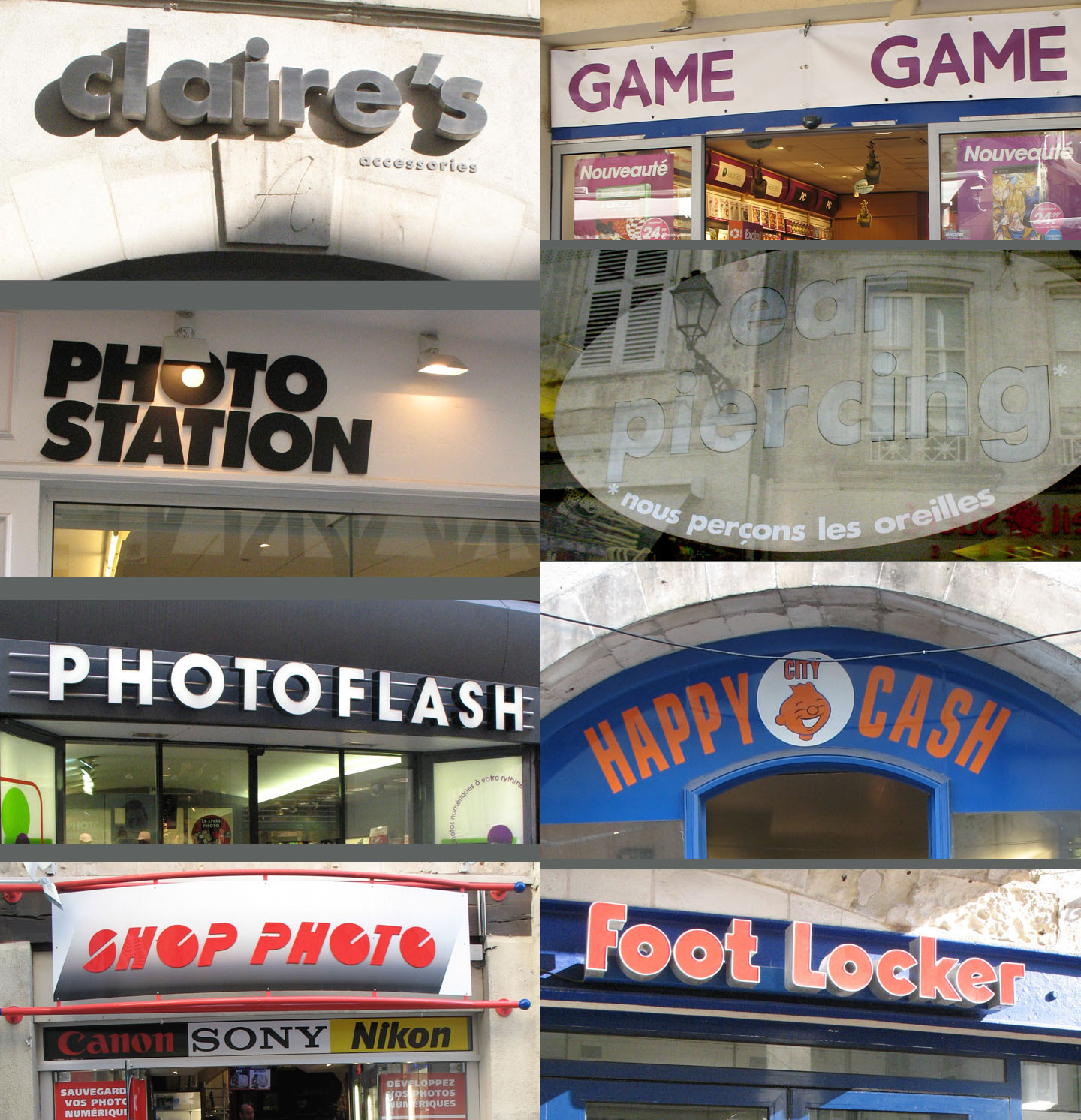
A typical shopping centre in La Rochelle, in western France, shows many examples of the English language.

In English, Franglais means a combination of English and French. It evokes the linguistic concepts of mixed language and barbarism. Reasons for this blend could be caused by lexical gaps, native bilingualism, populations trying to imitate a language where they have no fluency (sometimes known as creoles/pidgins), or humorous intent. Franglais usually consists of either filling in gaps in one's knowledge of French with English words, using false friends, or speaking French which (although ostensibly "French") would not be understood by a French speaker who does not also have a knowledge of English (for example, by using a literal translation of English idiomatic phrases).

Some examples of Franglais are:

- Longtemps, pas voir. – 'Long time, no see.'
- Je vais driver downtown. – 'I'm going to drive downtown.' (Je vais aller au centre-ville en voiture)
- Je suis tired. – 'I am tired.' (Je suis fatigué(e))
- Je ne care pas. – 'I don't care.' (Ça m'est égal or Je m'en fiche)
- J'agree. – 'I agree.' (D'accord)

=== In English humour ===
Geoffrey Chaucer's Prioress knew nothing of the French of France, but only that of Stratford-atte-Bow ('Cockney French'). Similar mixtures occur in the later stages of Law French, such as the famous defendant who "ject un brickbat a le dit Justice, que narrowly mist" ("threw a brickbat at the said Justice, which narrowly missed").

Another example in English literature is found in Henry V by William Shakespeare. In Act 3, Scene 4, a French princess is trying to learn English, but unfortunately, foot as pronounced by her maid sounds too much like foutre (vulgar French for 'semen', or 'to have sexual intercourse' when used as a verb) and gown like con (French for 'cunt', also used to mean 'idiot'). She decides that English is too obscene.

A literary example of the delight in mélange occurs in Robert Surtees' Jorrocks' Jaunts and Jollities:

You shall manger cinq fois every day," said she; "cinq fois," she repeated.—"Humph!" said Mr. Jorrocks to himself, "what can that mean?—cank four—four times five's twenty—eat twenty times a day—not possible!" "Oui, Monsieur, cinq fois," repeated the Countess, telling the number off on her fingers—"Café at nine of the matin, déjeuner à la fourchette at onze o'clock, dîner at cinq heure, café at six hour, and souper at neuf hour.

The 19th-century American writer Mark Twain, in Innocents Abroad (1869), included the following letter to a Parisian landlord:

PARIS, le 7 Juillet. Monsieur le Landlord—Sir: Pourquoi don't you mettez some savon in your bed-chambers? Est-ce que vous pensez I will steal it? La nuit passée you charged me pour deux chandelles when I only had one; hier vous avez charged me avec glace when I had none at all; tout les jours you are coming some fresh game or other on me, mais vous ne pouvez pas play this savon dodge on me twice. Savon is a necessary de la vie to any body but a Frenchman, et je l'aurai hors de cet hotel or make trouble. You hear me. Allons. BLUCHER.

The humourist Miles Kington wrote a regular column "Let's Parler Franglais" which was published in the British magazine Punch in the late 1970s. These columns were collected into a series of books: Let's Parler Franglais, Let's Parler Franglais Again!, Parlez-vous Franglais?, Let's Parler Franglais One More Temps, The Franglais Lieutenant's Woman and Other Literary Masterpieces.

A somewhat different tack was taken in Luis van Rooten's Mots d'Heures: Gousses, Rames: The D'Antin Manuscript. Here, English nursery rhymes are written with meaningless French phrases which are meant to recall the sounds of the English words, and the resulting French texts are presented as a historical manuscript and given a pseudo-learned commentary.

Another classic is Jean Loup Chiflet's Sky My Husband! Ciel Mon Mari! which is a literal translation of French into English. However, in this context, the correct translation of ciel...! is 'heavens...!'

In Monty Python's 1975 movie Monty Python and the Holy Grail, the French castle guard (John Cleese) orders, when King Arthur (Graham Chapman) does not want to go away, his fellow guards to "Fetchez la vache." The other French guards respond with "Quoi?" and he repeats "Fetchez la vache!" The guards finally get it: fetch la vache ('the cow'), which they then catapult at the Britons.

== French sense ==
In French, franglais refers to the use of English words sometimes deemed unwelcome borrowings or bad slang. An example would be le week-end (also weekend), which is used in many French dialects which have no synonym; however, Canadians would use la fin de semaine ('the end of the week') instead, although fin de semaine in France refers to the end of the work week, i.e. Thursday and Friday. Franglais also refers to nouns coined from Anglo-Saxon roots or from recent English loanwords (themselves not always English in origin), often by adding -ing at the end of a popular word—e.g., un parking ('a car park or parking lot' is alternatively un stationnement in Canadian French, although stationnement means 'the action of parking or the state of being parked' in European French); un camping ('a campsite'); and du shampoing ('shampoo', but pronounced [ʃɑ̃pwɛ̃], not */ʃɑ̃pu.iŋ/), which has been standardized and has appeared on many French hair-care product labels since at least the 1960s. A few words which have entered French are derived from English roots but are not found at all in English, such as un relooking ('a makeover'), and un rugbyman ('a rugby player'). Others are based on misunderstandings of English words, e.g.: un footing meaning 'a jog or a run' rather than 'a pediment'; un tramway meaning 'a tram', not 'a tram-track'. Still others are based on misapprehensions of English punctuation, e.g. un pin's (with the apostrophe in both singular and plural) meaning 'a lapel pin'; or word order, e.g. un talkie-walkie meaning 'a walkie-talkie' (hand-held, two-way radio). For those who do not speak English, such words may be believed to exist as such in English. However, in Canada, where both English and French are spoken, expressions such as footing and relooking are not used.

Some examples of Franglais are in fact imagined or examples of words being adopted from one language into another in the opposite direction of what many people believe. People who have no linguistic training or do not bother to consult dictionaries tend to create and perpetuate such urban legends about Franglais. For example, many numismatists think that the French spelling piéfort of the English term piedfort results from an imagined reintroduction of an English misspelling. In fact, the spelling piéfort is found in French dictionaries as an alternative of pied-fort and even as the only spelling given in the 1932–1935 edition of the Dictionnaire de l'Académie française and the etymology derived by professional linguists and shown in these dictionaries shows the change in spelling happened within French.

Owing to the worldwide popularity of the Internet, relatively new English words have been introduced into French (e.g. e-mail and mail, referring to either e-mail or an e-mail address). An equivalent for the English word e-mail derived from French roots was coined in Quebec French and promoted by Quebec government: courriel (from courrier électronique), and this term is now widely used there. The Académie française has also suggested the use of the abbreviation mél. (from message électronique) as an analogy with the abbreviation tél. for 'telephone', to be used before an e-mail address; however, the term mél., which roughly approximates the English pronunciation of mail, is now used more broadly in France than that prescribed usage. Another example from French is the word look. The equivalent of the English verb to look at in French is regarder but the noun a look (i.e. the way that something looks or is styled) has become un look in French, such that the sentence "This Pepsi can has a new look" in French would be "Cette cannette de Pepsi a un nouveau look".

== In France ==
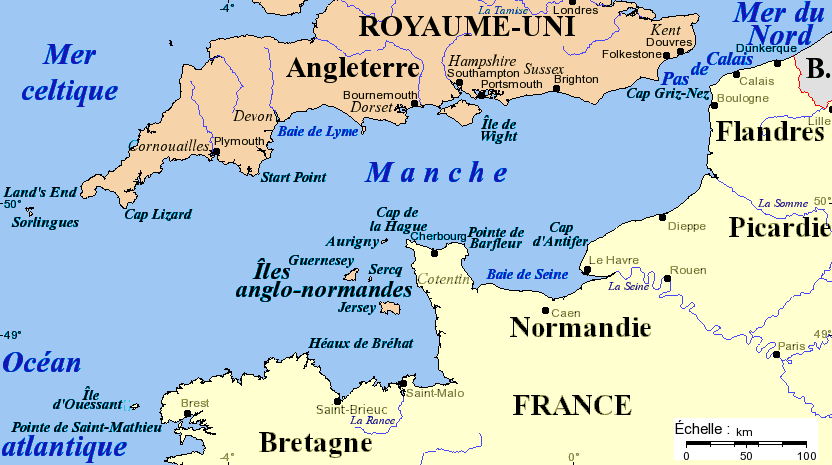
Map of the English Channel, a natural barrier between French- and English-speaking communities

After World War II, a backlash began in France over the growing use of English there. "Corruption of the national language" was perceived by some to be tantamount to an attack on the identity of the country itself. During this period, ever greater imports of American products led to the increasingly widespread use of some English phrases in French. Measures taken to slow this trend included government censorship of comic strips and financial support for the French film and French-language dubbing industries. Despite public policies against the spread of English, Franglais is gaining popularity in both writing and speaking.

In recent years, English expressions are increasingly present in French mass media:

- TV reality shows often use English titles such as Loft Story, Star Academy, Popstars, and Secret Story.
- A leading national newspaper, Le Monde, publishes a weekly article selection of The New York Times entirely in English and uses anglicisms such as newsletter, chat, and e-mail instead of French substitutions (bavardage/clavardage for 'chat' or courriel for 'e-mail').
  - Note that saying bavardage to a French person instead of Internet 'chat' may confuse them, since bavardage refers in France to real-life conversation and is rarely used in an Internet context. The word clavardage (a blend of clavier 'keyboard' and bavarder 'chat') is hardly known outside of Canada. The word chat in writing can be confusing as well since it natively means 'cat' in French; thus, the unique respelling tchat is occasionally seen.
- In James Huth's movie Brice de Nice (to be pronounced as if it were in English), Franglais is used in a satirical way to make fun of teens and other trendy people who use English words to sound cool.

Most telecommunication and Internet service providers use English and Franglais expressions in product names and advertising campaigns. The leading operator, France Télécom, has dropped the accents in its corporate logo. In recent years, it has changed its product names with trendier expressions such as Business Talk, Live-Zoom, Family Talk. France Télécom's mobile telecommunications subsidiary Orange SA runs a franchise retail network called mobistores. Its Internet subsidiary, formerly known as Wanadoo (inspired by the American slang expression wanna do) provides a popular triple play service through its Livebox cable modem. The second-largest Internet service provider in France is Free, which offers its freebox. Set-top boxes that are offered by many other providers are also following this trend (e.g. Neuf-box, Alice-box, etc.) and the word box by itself is gradually ending up referring to these set-top boxes.

SNCF, the state-owned railway company, has recently introduced a customer fidelity program called S'Miles. Meanwhile, Air France has renamed its Fréquence Plus frequent flyer program to Flying Blue. The Paris transportation authority RATP has also recently introduced a contactless smartcard ticketing system (like the Oyster card in London) called NaviGO.

Public authorities such as the Académie française and the Conseil supérieur de la langue française generally propose alternative words for anglicisms. The acceptance of such words varies considerably; for example, ordinateur and logiciel existed before the English words computer and software reached France, so they are accepted (even outside France in the case of ordinateur). On the other hand, vacancelle failed to replace weekend or fin de semaine (the latter being in current usage in Canada). The word courriel, equivalent to 'e-mail', coined and used in French-speaking Canada, is gaining popularity in written European French. However, most French Internet users generally speak about mail without the prefix "e-". Note that English words are often shorter, and they are usually coined first (the French alternatives are generally thought of only after the original word has already been coined, and then they are debated at length before coming into use). This is partly why they tend to stay in use.

Alternative words proposed by the Académie française are sometimes poorly received by a technologically aware audience and unclear to a non-technologically aware audience. The proposed terms may be ambiguous (often because they are coined based on phonetics, thus hiding their etymology) which results in nonsense (e.g. cédéroms réinscriptibles for CD-RW (literally 'rewritable CD-ROMs', despite ROM meaning 'read-only memory'). Some words are considered uncool, for example, tchat (formed by adding t- to chat) or dévédé (formed by writing DVD phonetically).

The use of English expressions is very common in the youth language, which combines them with verlan wordplay. The letter j is thus sometimes humorously pronounced as in English in words such as jeunes ('youth'), rendered as /dʒœns/ and thus written djeun's, to refer to this trend.

== In Canada ==
=== Quebec ===
Map highlighting Quebec within Canada

Quebec is the only French-majority province in Canada and the only de jure (but not de facto) monolingual jurisdiction. New Brunswick is officially bilingual, and the other provinces, while mostly English-speaking, are not officially English-only.

When a speaker uses calques and loanwords in speech which includes English or French words and grammatical structures in a combination, it is sometimes referred to as Franglais, or a mixed language.

Quebec French has longstanding borrowings from English due to the historical coexistence of two speech communities within Quebec (and especially around Montreal). Likewise, Quebec English, the language of the English-speaking minority, has borrowed many French words such as dépanneur ('convenience store'), autoroute ('highway'), stage ('internship'), circular ('flyer', from the word circulaire, a circulated pamphlet), and many others. These are permanent and longstanding features of local usage, rather than the recent slangish improvisation by any speaker or affinity group with poor knowledge of the other language.

These expressions have mainly become part of a common tongue/register born out of mutual concession to each other. In fact, the substantial bilingual community in and around Montreal will occasionally refer to Franglais, usually after it is pointed out by an observer that someone has used various French and English words, expressions or prepositions in the same sentence, a surprisingly common occurrence in various spoken registers.

=== Other areas in Canada ===
Canadian French is French as it is spoken in Canada. Scholars debate to what extent language mixture can be distinguished from other mechanisms, such as code-switching, substrata, or lexical borrowing. A mixed language arises in a population which is fluent in both languages.

The word Franglais refers to the long-standing and stable mixes of English and French spoken in some towns, cities, and rural areas of other Canadian provinces: New Brunswick, Nova Scotia, Ontario, Alberta, Manitoba, and Newfoundland. Such mixing is used in the northern regions of Maine (U.S.) (see Chiac and Acadian French). It has been asserted that this mix uses approximately equal proportions of each language (except in Newfoundland), although it is more likely to be understood by a French-speaker, since it usually uses English words in French pronunciation and grammar.

Franglais is commonly spoken in French-language schools in Ontario and Alberta, as well as in DSFM (Division scolaire franco-manitobaine) schools in Manitoba, where students may speak French as their first language but will use English as their preferred language, yet will refer to school-related terms in French specifically (e.g. "Let's go to the bibliothèque", instead of "Let's go to the library"). As many French schools and French immersion classes have a strict "French-only" policy, English or Franglais is used out of class, between students.

Because of bilingual product packaging, speakers and readers may form new pronunciations that become terms. For example, someone may pronounce the words on a package of strong cheddar and call it "old fort".

=== Mistaken and unstable usages ===
Franglais, in the sense of mistaken usage by second-language speakers, occurs across Canada. An example of an anglicism turned Franglais is the mistranslation of English phrases into French by students who are unaware of the Canadian French word. For example, a hot dog is sometimes called un chien chaud when the French word is simply un hot dog. (However, the Quebec government has itself promoted expressions such as chien chaud for 'hot dog', and hambourgeois for 'hamburger', neither of which has gained widespread acceptance.) In some ways, confusion over which expression is more correct, and the emphasis that many immersion schools place on eliminating anglicisms from students' vocabulary, has promoted the use of Franglais. Franglais can also slowly creep into use from mispronunciation and misspelling by many bilingual Canadians. Common mistakes that immersion or bilingual students propagate include incorrect inflection and stresses on syllables, incorrect doubling of consonants, strange vowel combinations in their spelling and using combinations of prefixes and suffixes from English.

Recently, Canadian youth culture (especially in British Columbia and southeastern Ontario) purposely uses Franglais for its comical or euphemistic characteristics, for example, in replacing English swear words with French ones. Some English-speaking Canadians, especially Anglo-Quebecers and those in southeastern Ontario, euphemistically use the Québécois sacres (i.e., religious words such as sacrament as expletives) rather than swearing in English.

=== Pseudo-anglicisms ===
There is a particular form of Franglish which consists of the adoption of English words with alternative meanings to their usage in English.

These are words like forcing ('a scramble', 'a rush', 'a strong effort'), or bronzing ('a tan', 'the act of sunbathing'), made by adding the English ending -ing to a verb from French (e.g. forcer 'to force' or bronzer 'to tan') to form a new noun. These are slang or informal at best, and not widely accepted.

Another type of false anglicism comes from the shortening of an English name, keeping only the first word (while the important word is the last). For example, a dress suit is designated by the word smoking, borrowed ultimately from 'smoking jacket'. Yet the British use dinner jacket and Americans use tuxedo (or tux); in English, smoking is used only as a participle and as the gerund. Another example is the use of the word clap for 'clapperboard' used in filmmaking.

They are either French constructions which mimic English rules, or shifts of meaning which affect borrowings.

== In Cameroon ==
Cameroon has substantial English and French-speaking populations as a legacy of its colonial past as British Southern Cameroons and French Cameroun. Despite linguistically segregated education since independence, many younger Cameroonians in urban centres have formed a version of Franglais/Franglish from English, French and Cameroonian Pidgin English known as Camfranglais or Frananglais. Many educational authorities disapprove of it, and they have banned it in their schools. Nevertheless, the youth-culture argot has gained popularity and has a growing music scene.

== Elsewhere in the world ==
Franglais is spoken in London, due to its large French-speaking population.

Franglais also thrives in communities where imperfect English–French bilingualism is common. The United Nations Office at Geneva is so named in an imitation of the French à Genève, rather than the expected "in Geneva".

Another example is provided by the civil servants in European Union institutions (European Parliament, European Commission, European Court of Justice), based in bilingual Brussels (French and Dutch) and Luxembourg City (Luxembourgish and German). They often work in English, but they are surrounded by a French-speaking environment, which influences their English (e.g. "I'm a stagiaire at the Commission and I'm looking for another stage in a consultancy", referring to internships).

== Songs ==
- A notable song with substantial Franglais lyrics was "(Si Si) Je Suis un Rock Star", written and recorded by Bill Wyman. The record reached #14 in the UK Singles Chart in 1981.
- The song "Je Suis Une Dolly" by Dolly Rockers references French culture whilst singing to a Frenchman.
- "Lady Marmalade", initially recorded by Labelle, is set in New Orleans and mixes in French and French-sounding words to its English lyrics, most famously the refrain "voulez-vous coucher avec moi, ce soir?"
- The song "For Me, for Me, Formidable" by Charles Aznavour relates the struggle of a French singer trying to sing a love song to an English girl.
- The song "I Want to Pogne" by Rock et Belles Oreilles.
- "It is not because you are" by Renaud.
- "I went to the market, mon p'tit panier sous mon bras", a popular Acadian song made famous by Gilles Vigneault.
- "Michelle" by the Beatles ('Michelle, ma belle, these are words that go together well: ma Michelle' and more).
- "L'amour à la française", French entry at the Eurovision Song Contest 2007.
- Québécois musician Daniel Lanois has written many songs in Franglais, including "O Marie" and "Under a Stormy Sky" from his 1989 album Acadie and "The Collection of Marie Claire" from his 1993 album For the Beauty of Wynona
- The 1969 song by Québécois singer Robert Charlebois "Les ailes d’un ange" is peppered with Franglais and Anglicisms common in Canadian French.

.

== See also ==
- Post-creole continuum
- Cultural identity and Cultural imperialism
- Creole language
- Code-switching
- Loanword
- Dunglish
- Spanglish
- Béarlachas
