= Varieties of French =

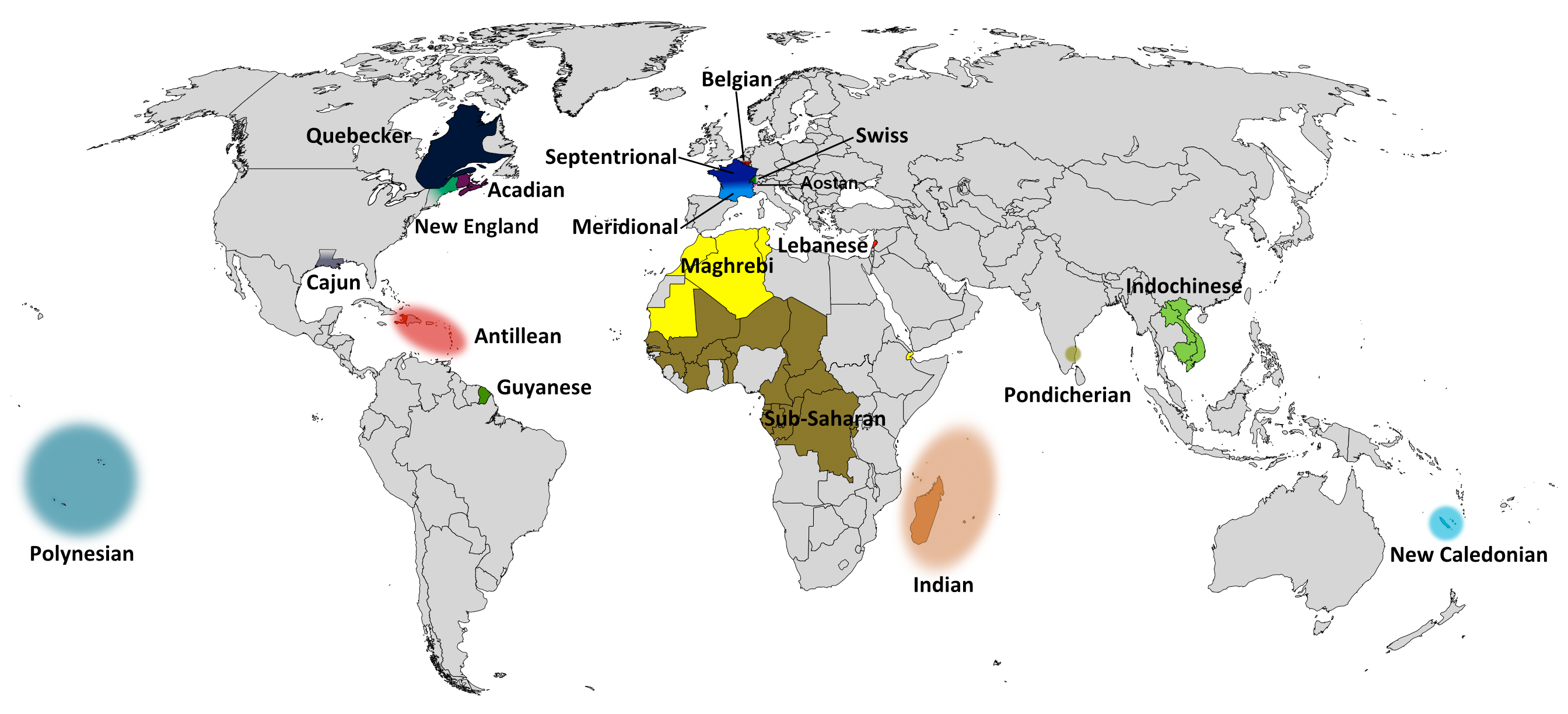
Dialects of the French language in the world

Varieties of the French language are spoken in France and around the world. The Francophones of France generally use Metropolitan French (spoken in Paris and considered standard) although some also use regional dialects or varieties such as Meridional French. In Europe outside France there are Belgian French, Swiss French, and in Italy Aostan French. In Canada, French is an official language along with English; the two main dialects of French in Canada are Canadian French and Acadian French. Standard French (e.g. used by Anglophones speaking French or by Francophones in Canada using a different dialect) is also commonly grouped as Canadian French. In Lebanon, French was an official language until 1941 and the main dialect spoken there is Lebanese French or Levantine French. Levantine French was also spoken by Sephardic Jews in Thessaloniki, Istanbul and Smyrna, by Armenians and Greek bourgeois in the urban centres of Asia Minor, by Syrian Catholics and Melkites in Aleppo and Beirut.

Note that the discussion here refers to varieties of the French language, not to the Romance sister languages (sometimes considered dialects) of French spoken in France (e.g. Picard, Limousin, Gascon, etc.; for these languages see: Langues d'oïl, Francoprovençal, Occitan and languages of France). See also French-based creole languages, which are also considered separate languages.

== Africa ==
French is an administrative language and is commonly but unofficially used in the Maghreb states, Mauritania, Algeria, Morocco and Tunisia. As of 2023, an estimated 350 million African people spread across 34 African countries can speak French either as a first or second language, mostly as a secondary language, making Africa the continent with the most French speakers in the world. While there are many varieties of African French, common features include the use of an alveolar trill and use of borrowed words from local languages. Many dialects of French found in the continent of Africa are highly influenced by the native languages that are spoken in each respective country. Two examples of the various dialects of African French are Abidjan French, or more broadly Ivorian French, and Kinshasa French.

=== Abidjan/Ivorian French ===
While various indigenous African languages are still spoken within the city of Abidjan, as well as within the entire country of the Ivory Coast, French is used by a significant amount of the population as it is the main language used in commerce, education, and government. Abidjan French, or Ivorian French, is linguistically distinct from a "standard" French through its unique phonetic and phonological differences, lexical substitutions, and grammatical borrowings. Many of these linguistic differences are influenced, either directly or indirectly, by the various native African languages spoken in the Ivory Coast. Concerning the phonetics and phonology of Ivorian French, it is not uncommon for the nasal [ɑ̃] phoneme to be produced as [ɑ], specifically at the start of a word while the palato-alveolar fricatives [ʒ] and [ʃ] often possess a degree of difficulty in their pronunciation. An abundance of words from regional African languages are utilized as loanwords in Ivorian French and some meanings of French words have changed over time (ex. the term commerce which in French relates to the domain of "trade, business", in Ivorian French has evolved into meaning a large "shopping street" with many stores where "trade occurs". Additionally, differences in grammar are seen in Abidjan French, as compared to a more traditional French, such as the omission of articles and prepositions in some linguistic contexts.

=== Kinshasa French ===
Kinshasa French is the main language used in government and commerce domains in the Democratic Republic of the Congo (DR Congo) since independence from Belgium in 1960, however this French is highly influenced by the four national languages (Lingala, Swahili, Kikongo, and Tshiluba) that are spoken much more frequently and casually. Many elements of Kinshasa French are also influenced from Belgian French, for reasons relating back to colonial times. The French spoken in Kinshasa varies from a "standard" French in many ways; including the posteriorization of the French anterior vowel [y] (converting it to the phoneme [u]), the delabialization of the phoneme [ɥ] (which becomes [j]), as well as the palatalization of apico-dental consonants that are followed by the anterior vowels [i] and [y] (ex. a French word such as dix [dis] is pronounced as [dzis]).

== North America ==
=== Canada ===
==== Acadian ====
Acadian French is a variant of French spoken by Francophone Acadians in the Canadian Maritime provinces, the Saint John River Valley in the northern part of the U.S. state of Maine, the Magdalen Islands and Havre-Saint-Pierre, along the St. Lawrence's north shore. Speakers of Metropolitan French and even of other Canadian dialects have some difficulty understanding Acadian French.

Notable features include /k/ and /tj/ becoming [t͡ʃ] and /ɡ/ and /dj/ becoming [d͡ʒ] before front vowels and the use of some archaic words.

===== Chiac =====
Chiac is a dialect of combined Acadian French and English and is spoken mainly around Moncton, New Brunswick. The pronunciation of French words is very different from other dialects and resembles English pronunciation. Chiac cannot be identified solely on its frequent use of English words since many other French dialects use many English words as well, but Chiac has an unusual amount of English. Chiac French has developed through proximity to English-speakers who settled nearby during the colonial period. Sounds that are characteristic of Chiac are the different use of the letters "d", "t", "r", and "c". Other differences include the use of vowel sounds such as "ea", "eo", "on", "an", and "oi". Such English-stylized pronunciations are different from other dialects of North American French such as Québécois and Brayon. Some forms of Chiac deviate from the original language to the extent that it is nearly incomprehensible to the larger Francophone community. Chiac is perhaps best categorized as a creole language alongside Haitian Creole and Louisiana Creole, French dialects that incorporate Indigenous, African, and other European languages, as opposed to dialects such as Québécois and Brayon that deviate slightly from Metropolitan French but are nonetheless derived primarily from earlier dialects of French with little contribution from other source languages.

==== Newfoundland ====
Newfoundland French is a regional dialect of French that was once spoken by settlers in the French colony of Newfoundland.

==== Quebec ====
Quebec French is the dominant and most prevalent regional variety of French found in Canada. Although Quebec French constitutes a coherent and standard system, it has no objective norm since the very organization mandated to establish it, the Office québécois de la langue française, believes that objectively standardizing Quebec French would lead to reduced inter intelligibility with other French communities around the world.

==== Ontario ====
Ontario French is often divided into two categories: North and South. The further north the more French is spoken and the closer the dialect and culture is to Quebec French. Further south, the French is closer to the global standard, with a more English cultural influence as well as a more Parisian grammar and dialect structure. Both Parisian and Canadian French are taught in the French immersion schools.

Notable features include [ɪ], [ʏ], and [ʊ] as allophones of /i/, /y/, and /u/ in closed syllables and affrication of /t/ and /d/ to [t͡s] and [d͡z] before /i/ and /y/ (the word tu is pronounced [t͡sy]).

Long vowels are generally diphthongized in closed syllables (the word fête is pronounced [faɛ̯t]).

=== United States ===
Several varieties of French emerged in the United States: Louisiana French, New England French and the nearly-extinct Frenchville French, Missouri French, Muskrat French and Métis French.

==== Louisiana ====
Louisiana French, the largest of the groupings, is spoken mostly in Louisiana and derives from the forms of the language spoken by the colonists of lower French Louisiana. Louisiana French is traditionally divided into three dialects: Colonial French, Modern Louisiana French or "Acadian" French, and Louisiana Creole French. Colonial French was originally the dialect spoken by the land-holding educated classes. Acadian, the dialect of the Acadians who came to French Louisiana in droves following their expulsion from Acadia during the French and Indian War, was spoken largely by the white lower classes. Louisiana Creole, a creole that developed long before Haitian immigrants arrived in Louisiana, largely developed as the tongue of the Louisiana Creole community and a significant portion of self-identified Cajuns. However, linguists now believe that the Colonial and Acadian dialects have largely merged into modern Louisiana French but remain distinct from Louisiana Creole.

French has gained co-official status with English in Louisiana, and there is both a thriving multi-generational base of speakers as well as a growing network of French immersion schools across the state in order to preserve the language. Louisiana also has a French-language society called CODOFIL (Conseil pour le développement du français en Louisiane) and cultural institutions dedicated to preserving French such as the Nous Foundation and Alliance Française of New Orleans.

==== Missouri ====
Missouri French is now spoken by a handful of people in the Midwestern United States, primarily in Missouri. It is the last remnant of the form of French once spoken widely in the region known as the Illinois Country, which was colonized as part of French Louisiana. It is considered very moribund, with only a few elderly speakers still fluent.

==== New England ====
New England French is the local name for Canadian French as it is spoken in New England, except in the Saint John Valley of northern Aroostook County, Maine, where Acadian French predominates.

== Caribbean ==
=== Haiti ===
Haitian French is the variety of French spoken in Haiti. The main difference between Haitian French and the Metropolitan French is in the Haitian speaker's intonation, a rather subtle creole-based tone being used. Importantly, differences are not enough to cause problems between both speakers.

== Asia ==
=== Cambodian ===
Cambodian French is the French of Cambodia. It dates back to the French colonization of Indochina in 1863. Many, especially the Khmer and Chinese peoples, learned French. Cambodian French was influenced by Khmer and various Chinese varieties, such as Teochew and Cantonese.

Cambodian French is still used as a second language in some schools, universities and government offices, but most of the younger generations and members of the business world choose to learn English. Otherwise, its speakers are generally elderly. Since the 1990s, there has been a small revival of French in Cambodia with French-language schools and centres opening. Many Cambodian students travel to France to receive studies as well as French-language media. Nevertheless, Cambodia has the smallest Francophone population of former French Indochina.

=== Indian French ===
Indian French is the French spoken by some Indians in the former colonies of Pondichéry, Chandannagar, Karaikal, Mahé and Yanam. There is a considerable influence from Dravidian languages like Tamil (Puducherry Tamil dialect), Telugu (Yanam Telugu dialect) and Malayalam (Mahé Malayalam dialect).

=== Lao ===
Lao French is spoken in Laos. It goes back to the French colonization of Indochina despite a decline in the language after the country's independence and the communist takeover. A revival has now raised the number of students learning French to 35%. In addition, the Laotian élite and the elderly population speak French, which is the diplomatic language of Laos.

=== Vietnamese ===
Vietnamese French is spoken in Vietnam, which has the largest Francophone population in Asia. Over 5% of the population learn the language or speak it well. French is also spoken among the elderly in Vietnam as a legacy of the colonial French era and also by the country's élite. A French pidgin, Tây Bồi, was spoken by Vietnamese servants in French households during the colonial era. Since the end of the Vietnam War in 1975, the number of French-speakers in Vietnam and the number of students taking the language have declined, but French remains taught as an optional foreign language in higher education.

== Europe ==
=== Aostan ===
Aostan French (French: français valdôtain) is the variety of French spoken in the Aosta Valley of Italy, where there is a significant trilingual Francophone population. Some expressions, words and phrases are different from Standard French, some of them are similar to Swiss French and some reflect the influence of Piedmontese language or Italian. Both French and Italian overlay the indigenous local language continuum of Aosta Valley, called Valdôtain (locally, patois), which is Franco-Provençal in type.

=== Belgian ===
Belgian French (French: français de Belgique) is the variety of French spoken mainly in the French Community of Belgium, alongside related minority regional languages such as Walloon, Picard, Champenois and Gaumais. Notable features include a strong distinction between long and short vowels, the lack of the approximant /ɥ/, and the use of certain Belgicisms.

=== Jersey Legal ===
Jersey Legal French is the official dialect of French used administratively in Jersey. Notable features include some archaic word choices and the words septante and nonante for "seventy" and "ninety" respectively.

=== Jewish French ===
Jewish French is an ethnolect of French spoken by 200-300 thousand of 480-600 thousand Jews in France and 200 thousand French Jews in Israel. Unlike most other Jewish languages, it is not considered in decline, but instead is doing well. It contains some influence from Yiddish, Israeli Hebrew as well as Judeo-Arabic from Maghrebi Jews who moved to France after being expelled from North Africa. Today there is media, both digital and physical, in Jewish French. It is not descendent from Zarphatic.

=== Meridional ===
Meridional French (French: français méridional) is the regional variant of French spoken in Occitania. It is strongly influenced by Occitan.

=== Swiss ===
Swiss French (French: français de Suisse, Suisse romand) is the variety of French spoken in the French-speaking area of Switzerland known as Romandy. The differences between Swiss French and Parisian French are minor and mostly lexical.

== Oceania ==
=== New Caledonian ===
New Caledonian French (French: français de Nouvelle-Calédonie) is the local name of the French varieties spoken in the French overseas territory of New Caledonia. It is the native language of the Caldoche (inhabitants of European origin) and is also used as a secondary language by the indigenous Melanesian Kanaks (who mainly speak the New Caledonian languages), and Asian and Polynesian immigrants.

== See also ==
- Français fondamental – Simplified version of French
- French language
- Geographical distribution of French speakers
- Langues d'oïl
- Occitan
- Dialect
- French-based creole languages
- Languages of France
- La Francophonie
- Law French
- Standard French
