= Canadian French =

Variety of the French language

- Français canadien
- Pronunciation: [fʁãˈsɛ kanaˈd͡zjɛ̃]
- Native to: Canada (primarily Quebec, Ontario, Manitoba, New Brunswick, Prince Edward Island, and Nova Scotia, but present throughout the country); smaller numbers in emigrant communities in New England (especially Maine and Vermont), United States
- Native speakers: 7,800,000 (2021 census)
- Language family: Indo-European: Italic; Latino-Faliscan; Latinic; Romance; Italo-Western; Western; Gallo-Iberian; Gallo-Romance; Gallo-Rhaetian?; Arpitan–Oïl; Oïl; Francien zone; French; Canadian French
- Early forms: Old Latin: Vulgar Latin; Proto-Romance; Old French; Middle French
- Dialects: Newfoundland Peninsular; Ontario; Métis; Acadian; Québécois; New England; Detroit River
- Writing system: Latin script (French alphabet); French Braille

Official status
- Official language in: Canada

Language codes
- ISO 639-3: –
- Glottolog: None
- IETF: fr-CA

Canadian French (French: français canadien, [fʁãˈsɛ kanaˈd͡zjɛ̃]) is the French language as it is spoken in Canada. It includes multiple varieties, the most prominent of which is Québécois (Quebec French). Formerly Canadian French referred solely to Quebec French and the closely related varieties of Ontario (Franco-Ontarian) and Western Canada—in contrast with Acadian French, which is spoken by Acadians in New Brunswick (including the Chiac dialect) and some areas of Nova Scotia (including the dialect St. Marys Bay French), Prince Edward Island and Newfoundland & Labrador (where Newfoundland French is also spoken).

== Dialects and varieties ==
Quebec French is spoken in Quebec. Closely related varieties are spoken by Francophone communities in Ontario, Western Canada and the New England region of the United States, differing only from Quebec French primarily by their greater linguistic conservatism. The term Laurentian French has limited applications as a collective label for all these varieties, and Quebec French has also been used for the entire dialect group. The overwhelming majority of francophone Canadians speak this dialect.

Acadian French is spoken by over 350,000 Acadians in parts of the Maritime provinces, Newfoundland, the Magdalen Islands, the Lower North Shore and the Gaspé Peninsula. St. Marys Bay French is a variety of Acadian French spoken in Nova Scotia.

Brayon French is spoken in Madawaska County, New Brunswick, and, to a lesser extent, Aroostook County, Maine, and Beauce of Quebec. Although superficially a phonological descendant of Acadian French, analysis reveals it is morphosyntactically identical to Quebec French. It is believed to have resulted from a localized levelling of contact dialects between Québécois and Acadian settlers.

Métis French is spoken in Manitoba and Western Canada by the Métis, descendants of First Nations mothers and voyageur fathers during the fur trade. Many Métis spoke Cree in addition to French, and over the years they developed a unique mixed language distinct from their French dialect called Michif by combining Métis French nouns, numerals, articles and adjectives with Cree verbs, demonstratives, postpositions, interrogatives and pronouns. Both the Michif language and the Métis dialect of French are severely endangered.

Newfoundland French is spoken by a small population on the Port au Port Peninsula of Newfoundland. It is endangered—both Quebec French and Acadian French are now more widely spoken among Newfoundland Francophones than the distinctive peninsular dialect.

=== Sub-varieties ===
There are two main sub-varieties of Canadian French. Joual is an informal variety of French spoken in working-class neighbourhoods in Quebec. Chiac is a blending of Acadian French syntax and vocabulary, with numerous lexical borrowings from English.

== Historical usage ==
The term "Canadian French" was formerly used to refer specifically to Quebec French and the closely related varieties of Ontario and Western Canada descended from it. This is presumably because Canada and Acadia were distinct parts of New France, and also of British North America, until 1867. The term is no longer usually deemed to exclude Acadian French.

Phylogenetically, Quebec French, Métis French and Brayon French are representatives of koiné French in the Americas whereas Acadian French, Cajun French, and Newfoundland French are derivatives of non-koiné local dialects in France.

== Use of anglicisms ==
The term anglicism (anglicisme) is related to the linguistic concepts of loanwords, barbarism, diglossia, and the macaronic mixture of the French and English languages.

According to some, French spoken in Canada includes many anglicisms. The "Banque de dépannage linguistique" (Language Troubleshooting Database) by the Office québécois de la langue française distinguishes between different kinds of anglicisms:

- Complete anglicisms are words or groups of loan words from the English language. The form is often exactly the same as in English (e.g., "glamour", "short", and "sweet"), but sometimes there is a slight adjustment to the French language (e.g., "drabe", which comes from the English word "drab").
- Hybrid anglicisms are new words, formed by the addition of a French element to an English word. This element (a suffix, for instance) sometimes replaces a similar element of the English word. "Booster" is an example of hybrid anglicism; it is made up of the English verb "to boost", to which the French suffix –er is added.
- Semantic anglicisms are French words used in a sense which exists in English but not in French. Examples include ajourner ("postpone") in the sense of "to have a break", pathétique in the sense of "miserable" or "pitiful", plancher ("floor/surface") in the sense of "floor" (level of a building), and préjudice ("harm/injury") in the sense of "(unfavorable) opinion".
- Syntactic anglicisms are those relating to the word order of a sentence and the use of prepositions and conjunctions. The expression "un bon dix minutes" ("a good ten minutes"), for instance, comes from the English language; the more conventional French wording would be "dix bonnes minutes". The use of the preposition pour ("for") after the verbs demander ("ask [for]") and chercher ("search/look [for]") is also a syntactic anglicism.
- Morphological anglicisms are literal translations (or calques) of the English forms. With this kind of borrowing, every element comes from French, but what results from it as a whole reproduces, completely or partly, the image transmitted in English. The word technicalité, for instance, is formed under English influence and does not exist in standard French (which would instead use the phrasing "détail technique"). À l'année longue ("all year long"), appel conférence ("conference call"), and prix de liste ("list price") are other morphological examples of anglicisms.
- Finally, sentencial anglicisms are loan idioms peculiar to the English language. The expressions ajouter l'insulte à l'injure ("add insult to injury") and sonner une cloche ("ring a bell") are sentencial anglicisms.

Academic, colloquial, and pejorative terms are used in Canada to refer to the vernacular. Examples are des "sabirisation" (from sabir, "pidgin"), Franglais, Français québécois, and Canadian French.

== See also ==
- Official bilingualism in Canada
- French language in Canada
- Association québécoise de linguistique
- History of French
- Languages of Canada
- Quebec French lexicon
- French language in the United States
- CSA keyboard – the official keyboard layout of Canada
- Canadian Language Museum
- Maillardville
- French colonization of the Americas

== Notes and references ==
=== References ===
- The lexical basis of grammatical borrowing: a Prince Edward Island French
- Language in Canada. Edwards, John R.
- Canadian French for better travel. Montreal: Ulysses Travel Guides. 2004. ISBN 2-89464-720-4. Archived from the original on October 19, 2021.
