= Cayouche =

Canadian country singer (1949–2024)

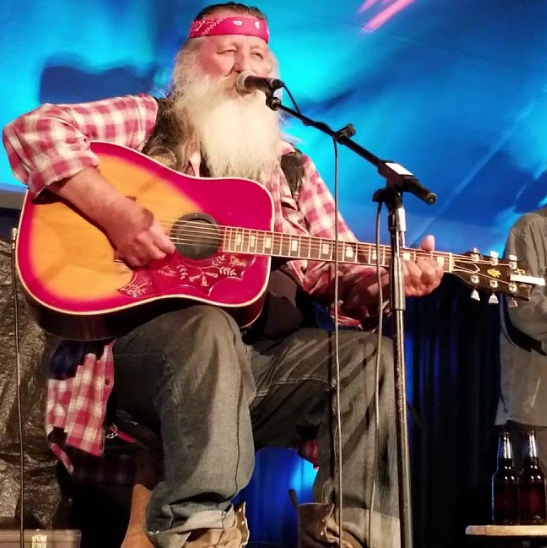
- Cayouche in 2018

Background information
- Also known as: Cayouche
- Born: Réginald Charles Gagnon; 7 January 1949; Moncton, New Brunswick, Canada
- Died: 29 May 2024 (aged 75) Maisonnette, New Brunswick, Canada
- Genres: Country, bluegrass
- Occupations: Singer, songwriter
- Years active: 1994–2024
- Website: cayouche.ca

Réginald Charles Gagnon (7 January 1949 – 29 May 2024), known professionally as Cayouche, was a Canadian singer and songwriter of Acadian descent. He is credited with creating Acadian French country music.

== Early life ==
Réginald Charles Gagnon was born in Moncton, New Brunswick on 7 January 1949. When he was 13 years old, Gagnon moved with his mother to the suburbs of Boston, Massachusetts. At the age of 19, he joined the United States Marine Corps and served in the Vietnam War, though he never saw combat. Following his time in the US military, Gagnon returned to Massachusetts. In 1979, Gagnon returned to Canada with only his backpack and a guitar, and traveled nomadically for the next eight years. That became the first step in his country-folk music career.

== Career ==
Gagnon's performance moniker Cayouche stems from the US, where he says that people would tell him "You're not Acadian, you're La Cayouche!", or the opposite of an Acadian. "La Cayouche" later became "Cayouche."

Even before the release of his first album, a Radio-Canada team had observed that Cayouche was already popular in the Acadian Peninsula. More than 25 years later, he remains popular the region. His first album, Un Vieux Hippy, released in 1994, sold more than 15,000 copies in a small market, and songs such as "La chaîne de mon Tracteur", "Export A", and "L'alcool au volant" attained relative popularity.

Cayouche has had consistent popularity throughout Canada and Europe and remains one of the few Acadian artists to have sold over 100,000 albums.

A few of his other hits are "Fume Fume", "C'est ça mon Acadie", and "La reine du bingo". Gagnon, who later came to live in Maisonnette on the Acadian Peninsula, was the subject of the documentary film Cayouche: Le Temps d'une bière (English: Cayouche: Time for a beer) by Maurice André Aubin in 2009.

== Personal life and death ==
Gagnon motorcycled as a hobby. One of his songs, "L'Alcool au volant" (Drinking and driving), was created to warn others of drunk driving; though in 2008, Gagnon was stopped by a Codiac RCMP officer and received charges of impaired driving and driving with blood alcohol content over the legal limit the following year, receiving a $2,000 fine for the incident.

Gagnon died from cancer in Maisonnette, on 29 May 2024, at the age of 75.

== Discography ==
- Un Vieux Hippy (1994)
- Moitié-moitié (1996)
- Roule, roule (1999)
- Last Call (2003)
- Le rappel (2011)
- Les Meilleures Tounes (2019)

== Filmography ==
- Cayouche, Le Temps d'une bière (2009)
- Pour l'amour du country (2001–2012)
