= Marie-Thérèse Lasselle =

New France artist (1743–1819)

- Mixed-media self-portrait by Marie-Thérèse Lasselle, c. 1780
- Born: 1743; Montreal, New France
- Died: 1819 (aged 75–76); River Raisin settlement (Monroe, Michigan)
- Known for: 18th-century female watercolor and textile art, Self-Portrait (c. 1780)

Marie-Thérèse Lasselle (1743–1819) was an 18th-century artist from Montreal who created one of the earliest known artistic likenesses of a woman from the Great Lakes region. The mixed-media portrait combines embroidery with watercolor on fabric. She was from a family of fur traders.

== Biography ==
Born Marie-Thérèse Berthelet dit Savoyard in Montreal in 1743 (Note: Some sources give her birth year as 1735.), she was educated in a convent school in Montreal before marrying Jacques Lasselle at Lachine, near Montreal, on February 18, 1765. The fur trade took her family from Montreal to Kekionga (Fort Wayne, Indiana), Fort Pontchartrain (Detroit, Michigan), and the River Raisin settlement (Monroe, Michigan). Her family traded with Native American peoples. Her eldest son, Jacques Lasselle Jr., married a daughter of the Shawnee chief Blue Jacket and signed the Treaty of Greenville as an interpreter. Marie-Thérèse Lasselle died in the River Raisin settlement in 1819.

== Self-portrait ==
Lasselle's self-portrait, created around 1780 while living in Detroit, is a rare example of surviving art created by a woman in the 18th century on the North American frontier. It has been useful to historians as it provides evidence of expression, dress, and material goods of early French-speaking women in the Detroit region. Art historian Heidi Strobel wrote, "Because the lives of these women are poorly documented, their embroidered self-portraits were more than just a likeness, for they served an important autobiographical function. The iconography and materiality of these portraits conveys information about late 18th-century beliefs about femininity, self-expression, and individual agency." The portrait was donated to the Monroe County Museum in Monroe, Michigan, where it remains.

== See also ==
- Mary Knowles
- Mary Linwood
- Muskrat French

== Archives ==
- Lasselle Collection, 1713–1904 (L127), Indiana Division, Indiana State Library, Indianapolis, Indiana.
