= Chiac =

Acadian French variety of southeast New Brunswick, Canada

- Native to: Canada
- Region: Acadians in southeastern New-Brunswick
- Language family: Indo-European: Italic; Latino-Faliscan; Romance; Italo-Western; Western Romance; Gallo-Romance; Oïl; French; Canadian French; Acadian French; Chiac

Language codes
- ISO 639-3: –
- Glottolog: None

An immigrant couple living in Massachusetts, United States, speaking a version of Chiac.

Chiac (or Chiak, Chi’aq) is a patois of Acadian French spoken mostly in southeastern New Brunswick, Canada. Chiac is frequently characterized and distinguished from other forms of Acadian French by its borrowings from English and is thus often mistakenly considered a form of Franglais.

The word "Chiac" can also sometimes be used to refer to ethnic Acadians of rural southeastern New Brunswick, who are not considered French Canadian historically and ethnically because of their separate and distinctive history. They are considered ethnically as "Chiac-Acadian" or simply "Chiac".

== Characteristics ==
As a major modern variety of Acadian-French, Chiac shares most phonological particularities of the dialect. However, Chiac contains far more English loanwords compared to other Canadian French dialects. Many of its words also have roots in the Eastern Algonquian languages, most notably Miꞌkmaq. Loanwords generally follow French conjugation patterns; "Ej j'va aller watcher un movie" uses the English-derived loanword "watch" as if it were an "-er" verb. The most common loans are basic lexical features (nouns, adjectives, verb stems), but a few conjunctions and adverbs are borrowed from English ("but, so, anyway").

== History ==
Chiac originated in the community of specific ethnic Acadians, known as "Chiacs, Chiaks or Chi'aq", living on the southeast coast of New Brunswick, specifically near the Shediac Bay area.

While some believe that Chiac dates back as far as the 17th or the 18th centuries, others believe it developed in the 20th century, in reaction to the dominance of English-language media in Canada, the lack of French-language primary and secondary education, the increased urbanization of Moncton, and contact with the dominant Anglophone community in the area. The origin of the word "Chiac" is not known; some speculate that it is an alteration of "Shediac" or "Es-ed-ei-ik".

== Geographic distribution ==
Chiac is mostly spoken by native speakers of Acadian French in the southeastern region of New Brunswick. Its speakers are primarily located in the Westmorland County of southeastern New Brunswick and further north along the coast in adjacent Kent County.

Further north along the coast, Acadian French resembling Quebec French is more common as the border with Quebec is approached. To the immediate east, west, and south, fully bilingual speakers of French and English are found, and the regions beyond typically have unilingual Anglophones.

== In culture ==
Acadian writers, poets, and musicians such as Lisa LeBlanc, Radio Radio, Fayo, Cayouche, Les Hay Babies, 1755, Antonine Maillet and many others have produced works in Chiac.

Chiac is also featured in Acadieman, a comedy about "The world's first Acadian Superhero" by Dano Leblanc.

== See also ==
- Acadian Exodus
- Acadian French
- Caló (Chicano)
- Cultural assimilation
- French language
- Haitian Creole
- Louisiana Creole people
- Louisiana Creole
- Michif
- Pidgin
- Shediac
