= French of France =

Variety of French language

- France French; Metropolitan French; Hexagonal French; Standard French
- français de France français de métropole français métropolitain français hexagonal français standard
- Native to: France
- Region: Northern France
- Ethnicity: French people
- Language family: Indo-European: Italic; Latino-Faliscan; Latinic; Romance; Italo-Western; Western; Gallo-Iberian; Gallo-Romance; Gallo-Rhaetian?; Arpitan–Oïl; Francien zone; French; French of France
- Early forms: Old Latin: Vulgar Latin; Proto-Romance; Old Gallo-Romance; Old French; Middle French
- Writing system: Latin (French alphabet); French Braille

Official status
- Regulated by: Académie française (French Academy)

Language codes
- ISO 639-3: –
- Linguasphere: 51-AAA-i
- IETF: fr-FR

French of France (French: français de France [fʁɑ̃sɛ də fʁɑ̃s]) is the predominant variety of the French language in France, Andorra and Monaco, in its formal and informal registers. It has, for a long time, been associated with Standard French. It is now seen as a variety of French alongside Acadian French, Belgian French, Canadian/Quebec French, Swiss French, etc.

== Phonology ==
=== Paris ===
In Paris, nasal vowels are no longer pronounced as in traditional Parisian French: /ɑ̃/ → [ɔ̃], /ɛ̃/ → [ɐ̃], /ɔ̃/ → [õ] and /œ̃/ → [ɐ̃]. Many distinctions are lost: /a/ and /ɑ/, /ɛ/ and /ɛː/, /ø/ and /ə/, /ɛ̃/ and /œ̃/, and /nj/ and /ɲ/.

=== Southern regions ===
In the South of France, nasal vowels have not changed and are still pronounced as in traditional Parisian French: enfant [ɑ̃ˈfɑ̃], pain [pɛ̃], bon [bɔ̃] and brun [bʁœ̃], but some speakers add a [ŋ] at the end. Many distinctions are lost. At the end of words, most speakers do not distinguish /e/ and /ɛ/: both livré and livret are pronounced [liˈvʁe]. In closed syllables, they no longer distinguish /ɔ/ and /o/ or /œ/ and /ø/: both notre and nôtre are pronounced [nɔtʁ̥], and both jeune and jeûne are pronounced [ʒœn]. The distinctions of /a/ and /ɑ/ and of /ɛ/ and /ɛː/ are lost. Older speakers pronounce all es: chaque [ˈʃakə] and vêtement [ˈvɛtəmɑ̃].

=== Northern regions ===
In the North, both /a/ and /ɑ/ are pronounced as [ɔ] at the end, with là is pronounced [lɔ] and mât [mɔ]. In Jura, the phoneme /ʁ/ is pronounced as a uvular trill: rouge is pronounced [ʀuːʒ], rêve is pronounced [ʀeːv], phonemic long vowels are still maintained: pâte [pɑːt] and fête [feːt], etc. In Brittany and Nord-Pas-de-Calais, phonemic long vowels are also maintained: neige [neːʒ] and tête [teːt].

== See also ==
- Languages of France
