= St. Marys Bay French =

Acadian dialect of Nova Scotia, Canada

St. Mary's Bay French
- français de la Baie Sainte-Marie (French)
- Region: Clare, Nova Scotia, Canada
- Ethnicity: Acadians
- Language family: Indo-European: Italic; Romance; Western; Gallo-Romance; Oïl; French; Acadian French; St. Mary's Bay French
- Early forms: Old French: Middle French
- Writing system: French alphabet

Language codes
- ISO 639-3: –
- IETF: fr-u-sd-cans
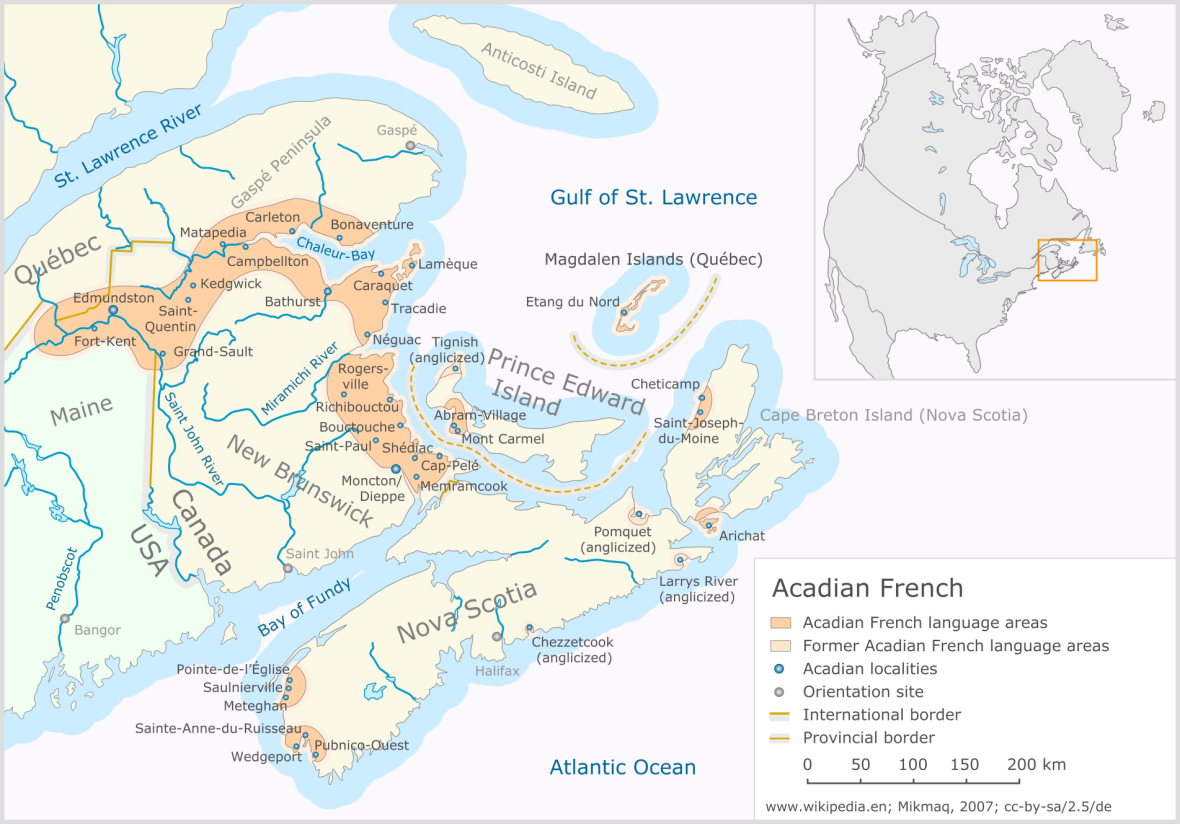
- In this map of Acadian French, Clare is on the west of Nova Scotia.

St. Marys Bay French (French: français de la Baie Sainte-Marie) is a dialect of Acadian French spoken around St. Marys Bay, Nova Scotia, specifically in the region of Clare, Nova Scotia. While sharing features with other dialects of Acadian French, it differs from these and other varieties of French in its morphology and phonology, and to a lesser extent its lexicon.

== Situation ==
The speakers of St. Marys Bay French live mostly in Digby County, Nova Scotia, in the villages of Church Point, Comeauville, Corberie, Grosses Coques, Meteghan, St-Bernard, Rivière du Saumon, and Saulnierville. French has been spoken by a minority in this region for some time; in 1941, the number of Acadian French speakers in Digby County numbered 9,560, out of a total of 19,472 residents. By the mid 1970s, the number of residents of Digby County reporting their mother tongue as French was 7,730, or 38% of the population.

== Comparison with other varieties of French ==
The phonemic inventory of Baie Sainte-Marie French is similar to the varieties of Acadian French spoken in Yarmouth County, to the south. However, it has idiosyncratic vowel phonemes, for example /i e o u y œ/ have various diphthongised realisations, as do several nasal vowel phonemes.

Phonological correspondences
Parisian French		Saint Mary's Bay		Meaning
Phoneme(s)	Example	Phoneme(s)	Example	Meaning
/ʒ/	jamais [ʒaˈmɛ]	/x~h/	jama's [xaˈmɑ], [haˈmɛ]	never
/ɛj/	soleil /sɔlɛj/	/ɑj/	soleil /sɔˈlɑj/	sun
/ɛʁ/	terre /tɛʁ/	/ɑɾ/	tarre /tɑɾ/	land
/ɛ̃/	main [mɛ̃]	/ɔn/	main [mɔn]	hand
/tj/	tien /tjɛ̃/	/tɕ/	tien /tɕɔn/	yours
/ʃj/	chien /ʃjɛ̃/	/ɕ/	chien /ɕɔn/	dog
/ɑ̃/	temps [tɑ̃]	/æ̃õ/	teaon [tæ̃õ]	time

A number of these correspondences are common outside of St. Marys Bay French and even Acadian French. A similar pronunciation of 'jamais' in part of Îles de la Madeleine occurs about as /xaˈmɑ/. In the Cajun French of Terrebonne Parish, Louisiana, jamais is often realized as /hɑ̃'mɛ/.

== In popular culture ==
Grand Dérangement's song "L'homme à point d'accent" (from the album Dérangé) is sung in St. Marys Bay French.
