= Brayon =

Francophone ethnic group of New Brunswick, Canada

Brayon Brayon, Brayonne
Regions with significant populations
- Canada, concentrated in the Madawaska region of New Brunswick.

Languages
- French (maternal language), English (as a second language), Franglais

Religion
- Primarily Roman Catholic

Related ethnic groups
- French, Acadians, Cajun, Québécois, Franco-Ontarian, Franco-Newfoundlander, French American

Brayons (/breɪˈjɒ̃/; French pronunciation: [bʁɛjɔ̃]), also called Madawaskayens, are a Francophone people inhabiting the area in and around Madawaska County, New Brunswick, Canada, and some parts of northern Maine.

In French, Brayons are referred to by the masculine les Brayons or the feminine les Brayonnes. They speak with a French accent also known as "Brayon".

== Etymology ==
"Brayon" used to be written as "Breillon". The origins of the word are not well known. It is hypothesized to have perhaps been derived from the verb "Brayer" (to pull on a rope), the noun "Braie" ("old clothes" in certain dialects of the West of France), or the verb "Broyer" (to crush; the inhabitants of the region used to crush flax).

== Culture ==
Given their location in New Brunswick, they are considered by many to be Acadians. However, some residents relate more to Quebec and have strong roots and ancestral ties to Quebec.

Brayons formed a distinctive culture with a history and heritage linked to farming and forestry in the Madawaska area. This is unlike both the primarily maritime heritage of the modern Acadians and the St. Lawrence Valley history of the Québécois.

== Geography ==
Historically, the formal borders between New Brunswick and Quebec, and to some extent Maine, did not matter much to the people of the area. This caused blending and commonalities and close relationships between people in the area, whether Acadian or Québécois or people from parts of northern Maine, forming a Brayon identity.

This Madawaska region was part of a border dispute and was claimed by Quebec when it was called Lower Canada.

The view of uniqueness led (at least jokingly) to the founding of the République du Madawaska during the Aroostook War of 1838, wherein some Brayons, disgusted with the actions of both British and American interlopers on their historical lands, declared themselves allied with neither and independent. The république was never formally recognized and was ultimately split by the Webster-Ashburton Treaty into American and Canadian parts.

Brayon French is not completely restricted to Madawaska County.

Brayon is a dialect of Acadian French.

== Other uses ==
Brayon(ne) is also the name of the inhabitants of the Pays de Bray in northwestern France (Normandy, Seine-Maritime département and Picardy, Oise département).
