= Muskrat French =

French cultural group of southeast Michigan, US

The Muskrat French (French: Francophonie au Michigan; also known as the Mushrat French or Detroit River French Canadien) are a cultural group and dialect found in southeastern Michigan along the Detroit River and Lake St. Clair, the western and southern shores of Lake Erie from Monroe County, Michigan to Sandusky, Ohio, and in southwestern Ontario. Their name comes from their tradition of eating muskrat during Lenten Fridays.

== History ==
In the context of the North American fur trade, French traders and settlers established vast networks of trading posts for trade with the Native Americans. Many voyageurs and coureurs des bois entered into formal or informal unions (marriage à la façon du pays) with Native women.

The first known use of the term Muskrat French is found in an 1877 essay by Detroit naturalist, historian, and writer Bela Hubbard.

== Culture ==
Self-portrait of Marie-Thérèse Lasselle (c. 1780), representative of an early French-Canadian woman of the Detroit and River Raisin region, and the Muskrat French.

Contemporary expressions of Muskrat French culture can be found both within the community itself, and within the broader community of Detroit residents who draw on local history for events. Within the general community, the Marche du Nain Rouge, an annual early Spring festival draws on the early Detroit folkstory of the Nain Rouge (Red Dwarf) to "expiate" bad influences from the city. Annual dinners featuring muskrat are held around Monroe County, Michigan, continuing a tradition from the earliest days of settlement. In Monroe, Michigan the folklore figure Loup Garou has been featured in events for children sponsored by the Monroe County Museum at the early French site, the Navarre Trading Post. Monroe, Michigan community organizations have long featured a muskrat as mascot, highlighting the local Muskrat French culture and its prominence in the area. The culture may be visualized in the c. 1780 self-portrait of former Monroe, Michigan resident Marie-Thérèse Lasselle at the Monroe County Museum. It represents one of the earliest known artistic likenesses of a French-speaking woman from the Great Lakes region.

While the Muskrat French culture is associated mostly with the Detroit River region, fur trade culture, in which many Muskrat French families originate, was widespread in the Great Lakes region. Families associated with the fur trade were part of kinship networks that often had members in towns throughout the region, such as in Green Bay, Cahokia, Kaskaskia, St. Ignace, and Michilimackinac as well as Detroit. Some scholars use the term Muskrat French to refer to the widespread articulation of French Canadian cultures as expressed in the Great Lakes.

Not all people of French-Canadian heritage in the Detroit River region identify with this regional subculture and may identify as simply French Canadian or French. Beginning in 2014, cultural advocates successfully sought resolutions from the Michigan Legislature naming the last week in September French Canadian Heritage Week in Michigan. The genealogies of many descendants of French settlers of Detroit and the Great Lakes region include Indigenous peoples. Familial, social, political, and trading partnerships frequently overlapped; for example, Marie-Thérèse Lasselle's eldest son, Jacques Lasselle Jr., married a daughter of the Shawnee chief Blue Jacket and signed the Treaty of Greenville as an interpreter.

While most local families of French origin eventually became monolingual English speakers, there is a local French dialect also known as Muskrat French, as well as unique culinary traditions, musical traditions, folkways, and folklore that are associated with the expression of this culture.

== See also ==
- Frenchtown, Michigan
- Findians
