= Spumoni =

Italian ice cream dessert

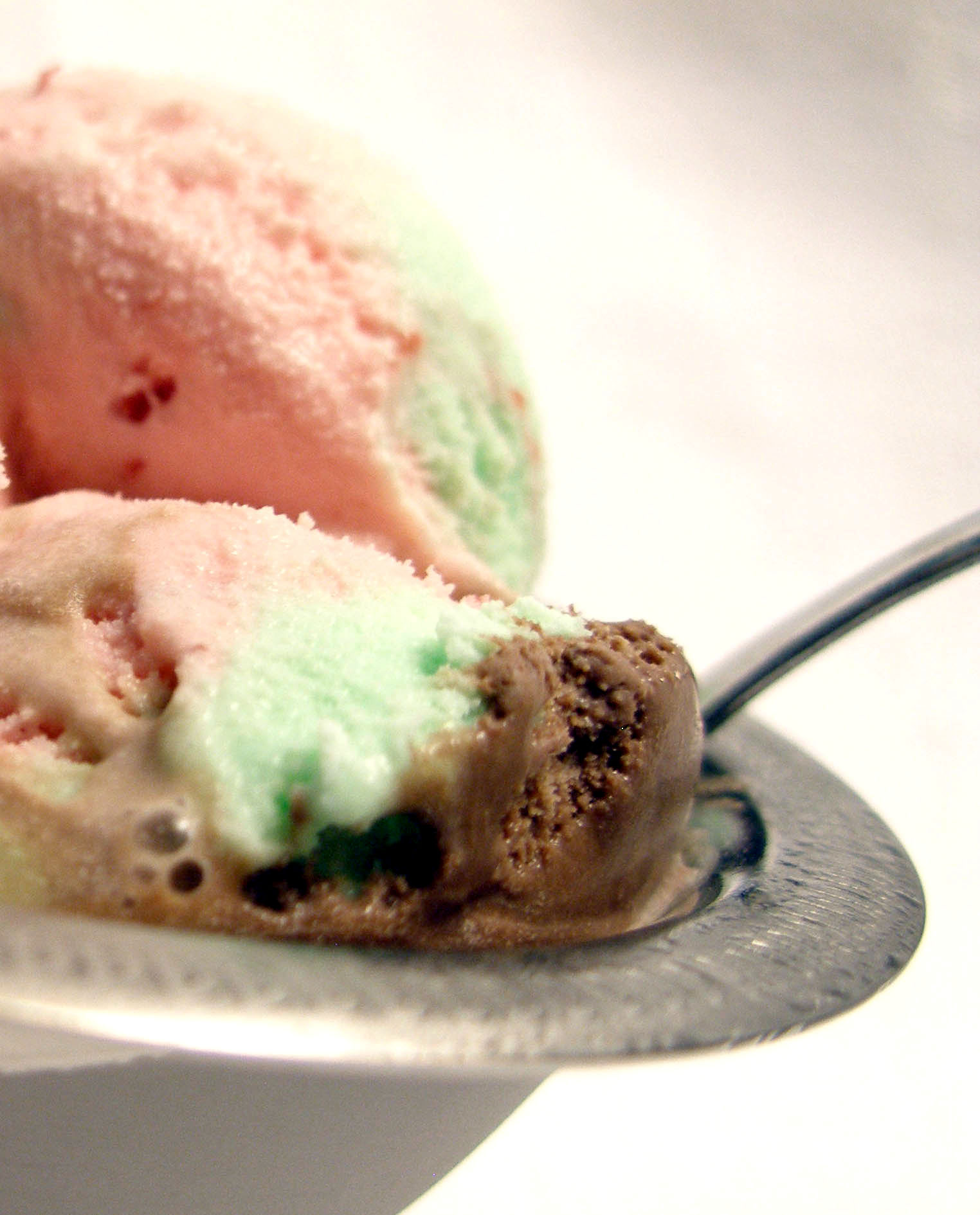
- A bowl of spumoni
- Alternative names: Spumone (Italian singular form)
- Type: Ice cream
- Place of origin: Italy
- Region or state: Naples, Campania
- Main ingredients: Ice cream, candied fruits, nuts

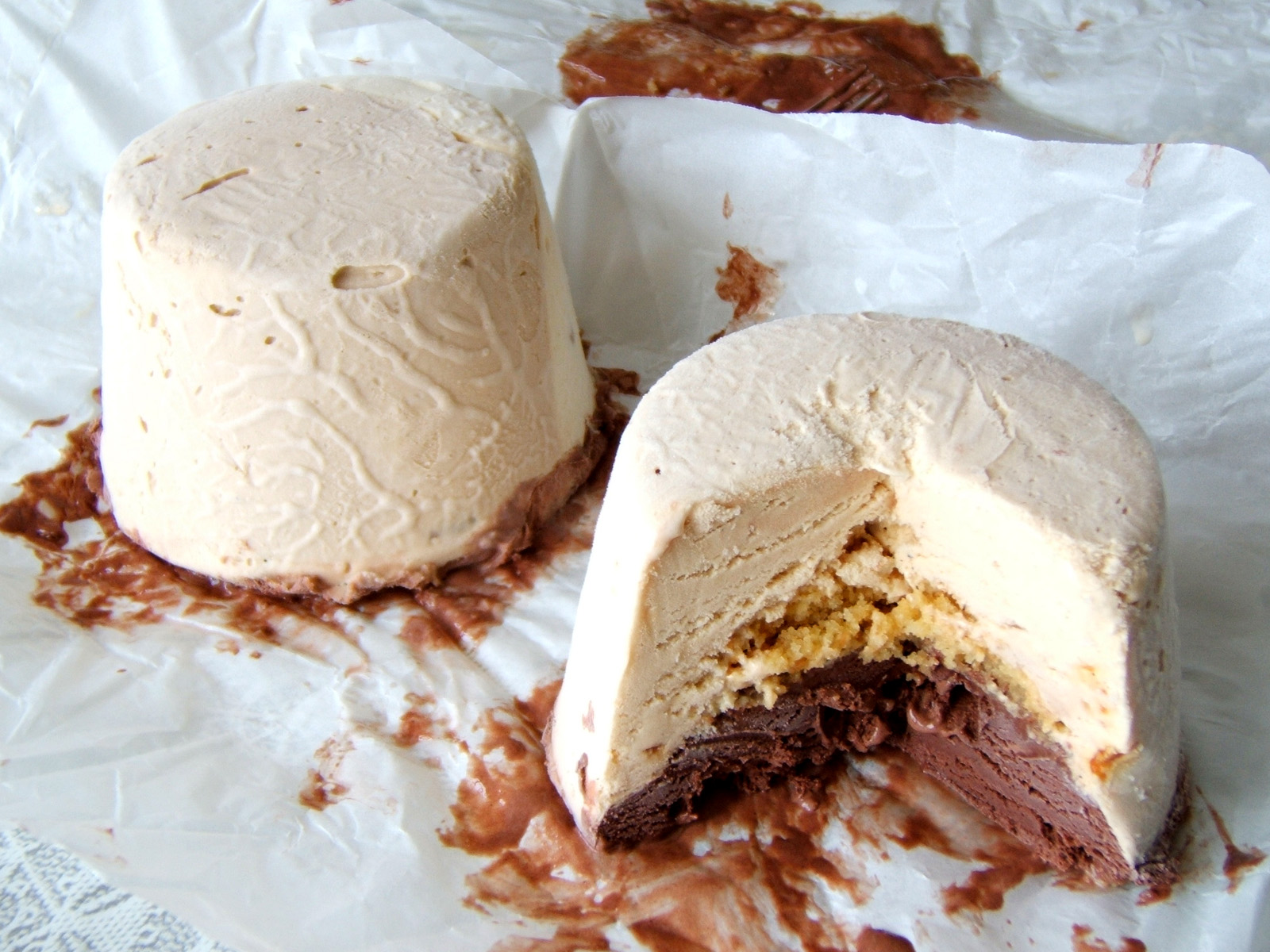
Spumoni salentini

Spumoni (sing.: spumone) is a molded gelato made with layers of different colors and flavors containing candied fruits, chocolate, nuts, and nut brittle. The three main flavors are pistachio, cherry, and chocolate (or sometimes vanilla). It was created at the end of the 19th century in Naples, Italy, (Note: Anna Del Conte credits the creation of spumoni to Naples and Sicily.) two hundred years after iced desserts were first made in the city. Over the following century, production of spumoni spread across southern Italy, taking on different forms by location.

The Italian version of spumoni is often lightened with whipped cream and has a very soft texture. They are usually placed in molds specially made for spumoni, although other molds can be used. To be considered a "true" spumoni in Naples, there must be at least two layers—semifreddo or frozen whipped cream making up the interior layer, and gelato usually making up the outer layer. In the city, spumoni are purchased, rather than made in the home.

In the Apulian town of Conversano, a local version has been made since at least the 1950s. In a conical metal container, a layer of hazelnut ice cream is placed, and local liqueur, chocolate, cream, and toasted almond meal are added on top. They are enclosed by a layer of chocolate ice cream, and the dish is then refrigerated. At the time of purchase, the spumoni is removed from its mold and wrapped. When it is ready to be eaten, typically after lunch, it is set down, unwrapped, and cut into portions.

Neapolitan ice cream derives from spumoni. Spumoni was well known in the US by mid-20th century—when the American edition of Ada Boni's Il talismano della felicità was published in 1950, Mario Pei told the readers in his introduction that contrary to their expectations, cheese and fruit were what Italians ate for dessert rather than spumoni.

== See also ==
- List of Italian desserts and pastries
- List of ice cream flavors
- Spoom – a related dessert
