= Regularization (linguistics) =

Replacement of irregular forms by regular ones

Regularization is a linguistic phenomenon exemplified by the replacement of irregular forms in morphology or syntax with regular ones. It has been observed in language acquisition, language development, and language change contexts.

Regularization is a common process in natural languages; it has been formally defined as a reduction in entropy. Regularized forms of words can replace irregular ones, or coexist with them.

== Types of regularization ==
=== Regularization in child speech ===
Examples of regularization can be often found in child speech, since they may expect a language to be predictable and regular. A child learner of English may choose to say "gooses" instead of the irregular plural "geese." Another example could be a child regularizing the past tense suffix -(e)d to all verbs, resulting in "I goed" instead of "I went."

Research studies have also shown that deaf children learning ASL from their non-native signing parents still regularize the language, even if their parents consistently use irregular forms. In one study, the deaf child used regularized morphemes 90% of the time, compared to his parents who did so only 70% of the time.

=== Regularization in adult speech ===
Adults can also regularize words. Regularization has occurred throughout history: in Middle English, for instance, the irregular plural form for "cow," "kine," fell out of use after being replaced with "cows".

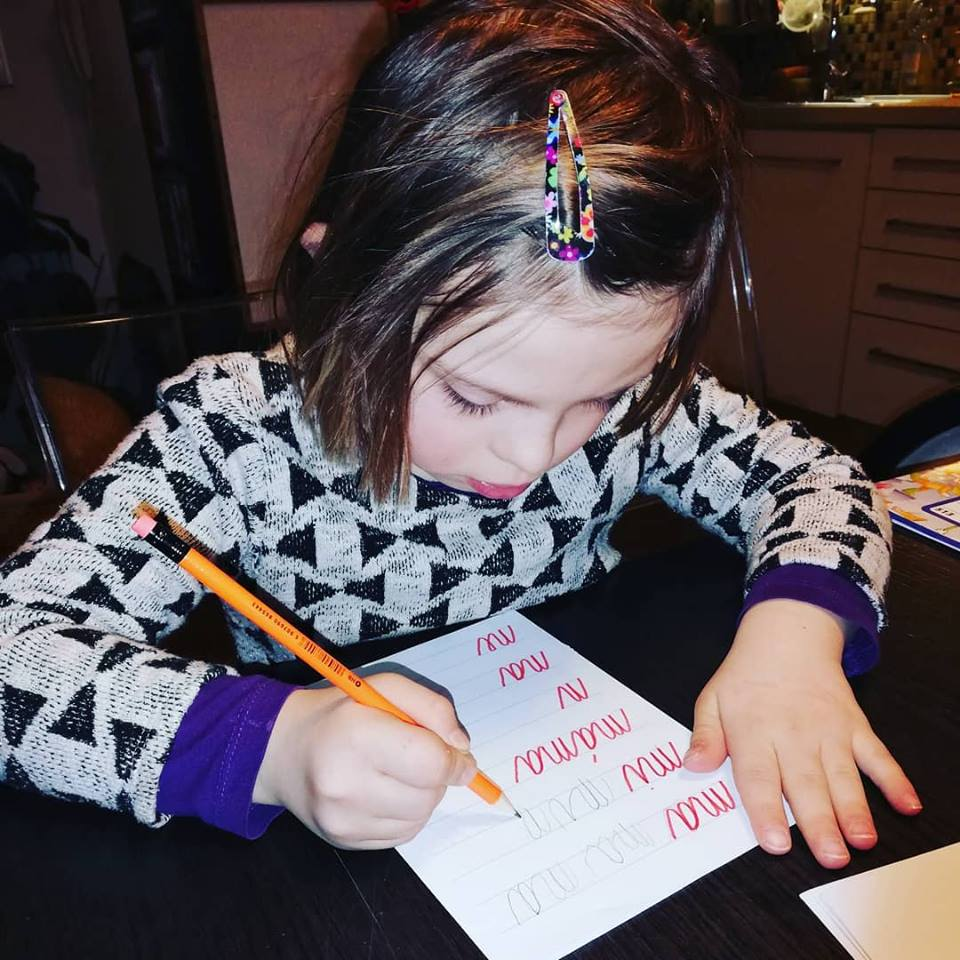
Children often overregularize when acquiring language

=== Overregularization ===
Erroneous regularization is also called overregularization. In overregularization, the regular ways of modifying or connecting words are mistakenly applied to words that require irregular modifications or connections. It is a normal effect observed in the language of beginner and intermediate language-learners, whether native-speaker children, or foreign-speaker adults. Because most natural languages have some irregular forms, moving beyond overregularization is a part of mastering a language. Usually, learners' brains move beyond overregularization naturally, as a consequence of being immersed in the language.

The same person may overregularize a linguistic form only sometimes in everyday speech. This results in regularized forms of words coexisting with irregular versions (such as "formulae" and "formulas"). Native-speaker adults can overregularize, but this does not happen often.

== Justification for regularization ==
Many reasons have been given for why regularization occurs. The most common one is that humans prefer regularity over randomness, especially young children. As we age, adults begin to memorize words based on probabilistic patterns instead. Other accounts of regularization argue that it occurs because of constraints on human memory. Word retrieval, when particularly difficult, chooses the most easily accessible form, resulting in regularization.

Another reason for regularization has to do with the frequency of a word. Less frequently-used words are more likely to be difficult to retrieve, by both child and adult speakers alike. As a result, they may be more likely to choose a regular form for them. A study by researchers at MIT found that a verb used 100 times less frequently will regularize 10 times as fast.

== Comparison with phonetic overcompensation ==
Phonetic overcompensation is a form of hypercorrection. Native-speaker children do not make phonetic overcompensation errors in the same manner or degree that foreign-speaker adults do because they do not carry the baggage of an earlier language's differences. However, overcompensation can happen to a native, monolingual speaker, either due to misspeaking or to a minor Freudian slip. Both could possibly involve neurologic processes that are analogous to phonetic overcompensation.

It can be compared and contrasted with overregularization. In both cases, a learner must master the automatic overriding of a rule to the point that it happens unconsciously and instantly—one case being phonetic, the other being morphologic. (The neurologic mechanisms of how that happens are still being investigated. Perhaps the brain needs practice in sidestepping the rule entirely as the needed objects [e.g., phonetic strings or past-tense inflected verb forms] are called directly instead of being derived on-the-fly via the rule.)

== See also ==
- Errors in early word use
- Spelling pronunciation
