= Geolinguistic organizations =

Geolinguistic organizations may be divided into academic associations, research institutes, and academic journals.

== Academic associations ==
The two oldest associations for individuals interested in geolinguistics both date to 1965 and are "Amici Linguarum" (language friends) and The American Society of Geolinguistics. Other important academic associations are the Asian Geolinguistic Society of Japan and The International Society for Dialectology and Geolinguistics.

=== Amici Linguarum ===
The "Amici Linguarum" was founded in Sweden in 1965 by a Swedish linguist and polyglot, Erik V. Gunnemark, with the aim to propagate interest in languages, linguistics, and traditional European culture through a network of polyglots and people sharing interest in foreign languages. After E. Gunnemark's death in 2007, the activities of the association temporarily ceased. The revived association began editing a journal (Chasok/The Hour/La Horita/L'heure) in 2010 and organising linguistic meetings as well as free 'linguocultural' courses.

=== Asian Geolinguistic Society of Japan ===
The Aim of this Society is "... to promote geolinguistic studies on Asian languages." Its activities include international conferences which have been regularly held every two years since 2012 and annual meetings held in Japan since 2013.

=== The American Society of Geolinguistics ===
This society was founded in 1965 by Prof. Mario A. Pei of Columbia University. Reflecting the goals of its founder, the mission statement of The American Society of Geolinguistics has as its purpose "... to gather and disseminate up-to-date knowledge concerning the world`s present-day languages, dialects, and other language varieties in the context of their distribution and use, their relative practical importance, their perceived usefulness and actual availability from economic, political and cultural standpoints, their genetic, historical and geographical affiliations and relationships, and their identification and use in spoken and written form. The Society, as such, has varying degrees of interest in linguistic geography, languages in contact and conflict, language planning and policy, language education and the broader aspects of sociolinguistics." Though now more linguistically oriented, it has been thought of as an organization bridging the gap between linguistics and the other social sciences, including language geography as a branch of human geography.

=== The International Society for Dialectology and Geolinguistics ===
This Society aims to promote dialectology and geolinguistics. It asserts its being "open to all theoretical and methodological approaches" and its willingness to collaborate "with all institutions concerned with dialectology and geolinguistics". Although it seeks "the exchange of knowledge in the domain of dialectology and geolinguistics, in particular with regard to new theories and methods", it puts emphasis on "the collaboration with all disciplines that contribute to the advancement of dialectology" and states its support for projects such as "the Atlas Linguarum Europae, the Panslavic Atlas, the Linguistic Atlas of the United States and Canada, and the linguistic-group atlases initiated within the ALE (Atlas Linguistique Roman, The Finnic Linguistic Atlas, The Germanic Linguistic Atlas, The Celtic Linguistic Atlas, etc." It also seeks the "preservation, in whatever form, of data, of dialects, of Jargons and slangs, of terminologies of traditional trades and of any other linguistic forms associated with disappearing ways of life" and offers its assistance "...to groups of researchers interested in the recording and study of dialects. It also lends its support to "the scientific study of minority languages and dialects, also with a view to their safeguard, in conformity with the declaration of human rights."

== Research institutes ==
=== Jinan University Chinese Dialectology Research Center (Jìnán dàxué hànyǔ fāngyán yánjiū zhōngxīn) ===
This research center sponsored, together with Foshan University, the Third International Conference on Chinese Geolinguistics 2014.

== Academic journals ==
=== Geolinguistics ===
This is an annual journal of the American Society of Geolinguistics that is distributed to all paid-up members. Articles for the journal are welcomed from members and non-members alike. It is specified that articles should be reasonably intelligible to educated non-specialists and that manuscripts will be evaluated for content.

=== Géolinguistique ===
This journal is published by the University of Grenoble. It is described as being for the exploration of "...the variation of languages (particularly of non written languages) in space." It is also stated that articles "may deal with any aspect and domain of language (above all lexis, phonetics, morpho-syntax, prosody and microtoponymy)." Its ISSN is 07619081.
