= Geographical distribution of Polish speakers =

The article provides details and data regarding the geographical distribution of all Polish speakers, regardless of the legislative status of the countries where it is spoken. The Polish language is the dominant language of Poland, and it is spoken in autochthonous minority areas through Europe and in many immigrant communities in all over the world.

== Statistics ==
=== Native speakers ===
This table depicts the native speakers of the language, which means that the table includes people who have been exposed to the Polish language from birth and, thus, excludes people who use the language as a L2.

Country	Absolute	%	Year	Reference	Definition
Australia	51,399	0.2%	2016	(Note: The reported population size was obtained by projecting the respondent percentage to the total population, since the source either included the part of the population who didn't answer or didn't take into account some parts of the population, for example children.)	Language spoken at home
Austria	30,598	0.3%	2001		Colloquial language
Belarus	4,216	0.1%	2009		Mother tongue
Belgium	16,298	0.2%	2012	(Note: Population data by Eurostat, using the source year. "The number of persons having their usual residence in a country on 1 January of the respective year". ec.europa.eu.)	Mother tongue
Canada	181,710	0.5%	2016		Mother tongue
Czech Republic	49,669	0.5%	2021		Mother tongue
Finland	5,982	0.1%	2021		Mother tongue
France	275,288	0.4%	2012		Mother tongue
Germany	983,000	1.2%	2024		Language spoken at home
Iceland	21,000	6.8%	2021		Mother tongue
Ireland	135,895	2.9%	2016		Language spoken at home
Latvia	1,774	0.1%	2001		Mother tongue
Lithuania	160,506	5.3%	2011		Mother tongue
Luxembourg	3,251	0.6%	2021		Main language
Netherlands	69,000	0.4%	2019		Language spoken at home
Poland	37,868,618	99.6%	2021		Language spoken at home
Russia	4,927	0.0%	2010		Mother tongue
Slovakia	3,821	0.1%	2021		Mother tongue
Spain	61,926	0.1%	2021		Mother tongue
Sweden	76,000	0.8%	2012		Mother tongue
Ukraine	19,195	0.04%	2001		Mother tongue
United Kingdom	724,014	1.1%	2021/2022		Main language
United States	576,816	0.2%	2016		Language spoken at home
Total	41,312,915	-			

== See also ==
- Geolinguistics
