= MLU =

MLU may stand for:

- Major League Ultimate, a defunct ultimate frisbee league
- Martin Luther University, in Halle and Wittenberg, Saxony-Anhalt, Germany
- Mean length of utterance
- Mid-life update
- Mirror lock-up, in SLR cameras
- Monroe Regional Airport (Louisiana), US, IATA code
- Mountain Locator Unit, emergency beacon
- To’abaita language, ISO 639-3 language code
- the SCMaglev, formerly MLU, maglev railway
