= Alonso de Espina =

Christian preacher and writer

Alonso de Espina (c. 1410 – after 1464) was a Spanish Franciscan Catholic preacher and writer. He was the author of Fortalitium Fidei, a treatise on arguments to be used to oppose detractors of Catholicism.

== Biography ==
Thought by some to be a convert from Judaism, Alonso de Espina was for many years superior of the House of Studies of the Friars Minor at Salamanca, Spain. Recent scholarship suggests that Alonso was not a converted Jew (converso).

=== Fortalitium Fidei ===
He was a man of great learning and attained considerable renown as a preacher, but his chief claim to fame was being the author of Fortalitium Fidei.

The Fortalitium was written in 1458, but it was added to by Alonso at different times up to the year 1464. The edition published at Nuremberg in 1485 begins thus:

Incipit prohemium Fortalitii Fidei conscriptum per quendam Doctorem eximium ordinis minorum anno MCCCCLIX in partibus occidentis (Here begins the introduction to "Fortalitium Fidei" (Fortress of Faith) written by a certain distinguished teacher of the Order of Friars Minor in the year 1459).

The fact that the Fortalitium appeared anonymously gave rise to some difference of opinion as to its authorship. The Fortalitium Fidei is a treatise on various types of arguments to be used by preachers and others to oppose detractors of Catholicism. It is divided into five books: the first directed against those who deny the divinity of Jesus; the second against "heretics"; the third against the Jews; the fourth, against Muslims; the fifth gives instructions on the battle against the devil. In this last book Alonso dwells at length upon the demons and their hatred of men; the powers they have over men and the diminution of these powers, owing to the victory of Christ on the Cross, the final condition of the demons, and so on.

The book was part of the witch hunting practices of the period, although it strays from them by stating Black Masses to be just hallucinations induced in the witches by the devil.

=== Other works ===
Alonso de Espina published at least three other works:

1. Sermones de Nomine Jesu Vigintiduos, issued about 1454 (which has been erroneously confounded with the Fortalitium by at least one noted Catholic scholar);
2. Sermones plures de excellentia nostræ fidei, preached in 1459; and
3. A treatise on fortune, dedicated to John I of Castile (1404–1454).

In The Complete Book of Devils and Demons Leonard R. N. Ashley says that Alonso is quoted as stating that the total number of angels who sided with Lucifer's revolt was 133,306,668, a figure, Ashley remarks, so precise that one hardly knows what to say; he adds that the Book of Enoch puts the number at 200.
