= Wörter und Sachen =

Philological movement in Germany and Austria

Wörter und Sachen (German for words and things) was a philological movement of the early and the middle of the 20th century that was based largely in Germany, Austria and Switzerland.

== History ==
The term "wörter und sachen" was first used in 1848 by German linguist Jacob Grimm. It developed into a descriptive research field for linguistic and factual research, which was first presented by Indo-Europeanist R. Meininger in "Wörter und Sachen" in Indogermanische Forschungen 17 (1904/1905). Further results were presented in the cultural-historical journal of the same name (Heidelberg 1909 ff.). Research was later published in English in Th. Bynon, Historical Linguistics. Cambridge 1977.

== Arguments ==
Its proponents argued that the etymology of words should be studied in close association or in parallel with the study of the artefacts and cultural concepts which the words had denoted. The process would, it was argued, enable researchers to study linguistic data more effectively.

For example, a "lamb" in an Arab shepherd's world may be very different from a "lamb" in another context. The shepherd may care about it being "weaned" or "fat" and, as a result, have two different names. Another example is the concept of qibla; it refers simply to the direction Muslims turn while praying, and as a result can be "south" or "north" depending on one's geographical position.

== Impact ==
Many of the principles and the theories of the Wörter und Sachen movement have since been incorporated into modern historical linguistics such as the practice of cross-referencing with archaeological data.

Later research has argued for taking into account the context of the cultural heritage of words when building linguistic models.

== See also ==
- Pragmatic mapping
- Dialect geography
