= Il cucchiaio d'argento =

Italian cookbook first published in 1950

- Cover of the first edition
- Language: Italian
- Subject: Cookbook
- Publisher: Domus (original); Phaidon Press (English and international)
- Publication date: 1950
- Publication place: Italy
- English publication date: 2005
- ISBN: 9788833331676 (Italian edition)
- Website: Official website (Italian edition); Official website (English edition)

Il cucchiaio d'argento (Italian: [il kukˈkjaːjo darˈdʒɛnto]), or The Silver Spoon in English, is a major Italian cookbook and kitchen reference work originally published in 1950 by the design and architecture magazine Domus. It contains about 2,000 recipes drawn from all over Italy, and has gone through eleven editions.

== History ==
It originated from a post-World War II pricing dispute between the publishers and some of the distributors of the popular Il talismano della felicità by Ada Boni.

Editoriale Domus still publishes the book as a single volume as well as a series of single-subject books. It is now in its eleventh Italian edition. Domus also produces Il cucchiaino d'argento for children, as well as creating recipes for Phaidon's books; these include regional cookbooks (so far for Tuscany, Sicily, and Puglia) as well as seasonal and single-ingredient books on pasta and seafood.

Several English versions (customized for the country of sale) were published as The Silver Spoon by the United Kingdom's Phaidon Press in 2005, then later in German, French and Dutch. They are based on the 1997 Italian edition, with a special section of recipes from prominent Italian cooks around the world. While Phaidon's original edition had been criticized for awkward measurements, the English editions have overall been well received and are very popular. In the US the book became a New York Times Bestseller, catching some in the industry by surprise.

Phaidon followed up in 2009 with The Silver Spoon: Pasta and The Silver Spoon Book for Children.

A revised English edition was released in November 2011, with adjusted measurements, 400 new photographs, as well as a new cover, more similar to the red leather binding of the original Italian edition.

In 2014 Phaidon published Chop Sizzle Wow: The Silver Spoon Comic Book, with a selection of 50 recipes in comics format. The concept and drawings were made by the Brazilian artist Adriano Rampazzo. In 2015 The Gourmand International awarded best illustrated cookbook published in 2014 in the UK. Then it was awarded best illustrated cookbook in the world for that year. Later on the same year, as a celebration of the 20 years of the Gourmand Awards, Chop Sizzle Wow received best illustrated cookbook of all times prize.

== Coverage ==
The book covers Antipasti & contorni (lit. 'appetizers and side dishes'), Primi (lit. 'first courses'), Secondi (lit. 'main courses'), Dolci (lit. 'desserts'), and Il cucchiaio d'argento estate (summer dishes).

== See also ==
- Italian cuisine
- List of Italian foods and drinks
