= Leonard R. N. Ashley =

American writer

Leonard R. N. Ashley (born January 5, 1928, in Miami) is an American writer on the English language. He was for many years professor of English at Brooklyn College. He was formerly on the editorial board of various academic journals in the US and abroad.

He served as secretary of the International Linguistic Society (1980 - 1982) and later was on its board, was vice-president of Amici Linguarum, and participated in the International Conferences on Onomastic Sciences in Europe. He is a former member of the United States Board on Geographical Names. is a president emeritus of The American Society of Geolinguistics. Aside from more traditional works on English drama, fiction, poetry, books on onomastics and geolinguistics, he is also known for his series of popular dictionaries of the occult. A recent installment in Dr. Ashley's series on the occult is the ultimate resource for information on the werewolf. He contributed a Chronicle (c. 35 pages each, thrice annually) of book reviews to Bibliothèque d'Humanuisme et Renaissance (Geneva) from the 1960s to the end of 2018 and published hundreds of book reviews in Names, Geolinguistics, etc., and articles in Names, Word Ways, Comments on Etymology, Etc., Journal of Popular Culture, Onomasica, Hamlet Studies, Points of View, and other academic journals in the US and abroad. Some of his books have been published in Dutch, Italian, German, and Norwegian translations as well as in US and UK editions.

== Publications ==
=== English literature and linguistics ===
- George Peele: The Man and His Work
- Colley Cibber
- Authorship and Evidence in Renaissance Drama
- Unhappy all the time": Religion in Anthony Burgess's Earthly Powers
- What I Know About You: 100 Lesbian & Gay New York Voices (novel and play)
- Cornish Names
- What's in a Name?: Everything You Wanted to Know (1989, revised 1995)
- Mexico: The Smart Traveler's Guide to All the Names
- George Alfred Henty and the Victorian Mind
- Spenser's Ideal of the Gentleman
- Geolinguistic Perspectives (ed., with Jesse Levitt & Kenneth H. Rogers)
- Ripley's "Believe It Or Not" Book of The Military
- Language and Modern Society
- Language and the New Technology
- Language in Action
- Living Language
- History of the Short Story
- Art Attack: Names in Satire
- A Garland of Names (with Wayne H. Finke, eds.)
- Names of Places
- Names in Literature
- Names in Popular Culture
- Animal Crackers (verse) and Poetry in Various Periodicals

=== Popular culture and the occult ===
- The Complete Book of Devils and Demons
- The Complete Book of Vampires
- The Complete Book of the Devil's Disciples
- The Complete Book of Spells, Curses and Magical Recipes
- The Complete Book of Ghosts and Poltergeists
- The Complete Book of Werewolves
- The Complete Book of Sex Magic
- The Complete Book of Magic and Witchcraft (2 German editions)
- The Amazing World Of Superstition
- The Complete Book of Superstition, Prophecy and Luck (also in Dutch)
- Ripley's Believe it Or Not! Book of the Military
- The Complete Book of Numerology (also in Italian)
- The Complete book of Dreams and What They Mean
- The Wonderful World of Superstition, Prophecy, and Luck
- Tales of Mystery and Melodrama
- Halloween
- Last Days: The Messiah, The Apocalypse, The Rapture, The Last Judgment

=== Folklore ===
- Elizabethan Popular Culture
- Nordic Folklore and Tradition (with Ola J. Holten) also published in Nynorsk in Sweden in a translation by Ola J. Holten and that some books on the occult are in UK as well as US editions and translations into Dutch, German, and Italian and some are reissued with new prefaces

=== Textbooks and translations ===
- Other People's Lives
- Mirrors for Man; 26 Plays of the World Drama
- 6 Plays of World Drama (Taiwan)
- Nineteenth-Century British Drama (Scott, Foresman reprinted revised by University Press of America)
- British Short Stories: Classics and Criticism (with Stuart L. Astor, Tales of Mystery and Melodrama)
- America: Naming the Country and Its People, Allen Walter Read, ed. L. R. N. Ashley)
- Colonial American English (Richard Lederer, ed. Ashley)
- A Garland of Names (ed. with Wayne H. Finke)
- A Narrative of the Life of Mrs. Charlotte Charke (ed. Ashley)
- Ballad Poetry of Ireland (ed. Ashley)
- Phantasms of the Living 2 vols., Myers, Podmore, Gurney, ed. Ashley)
- Reliques of Irish Poetry (ed. Ashley)
- Shakespeare's Jest Book (ed. Ashley)
- Suhrab and Rustum (ed. Ashley)

=== Conference proceedings ===
- Geolinguistic Perspectives (ed. Ashley, Kenneth H. Rogers, Jesse Levitt)
- Constructed Language and Language Construction (ed. with Wayne H. Finke)
- Language across Border (ed. with Wayne H. Finke)
- Language and Communication in the New Century (ed. with Wayne H. Finke)
- Language and Identity (ed. with Wayne H. Finke)
- Language and Politics (ed. with Wayne H. Finke)
- Language and Popular Culture (ed. with Wayne H. Finke)
- Language in Contemporary Society (ed with Wayne H. Finke)
- Language in the Era of Globalization (ed. with Wayne H. Finke)
- Language under Controls (ed. with Wayne H. Finke)
