= Language geography =

Study of the geographic distribution of languages

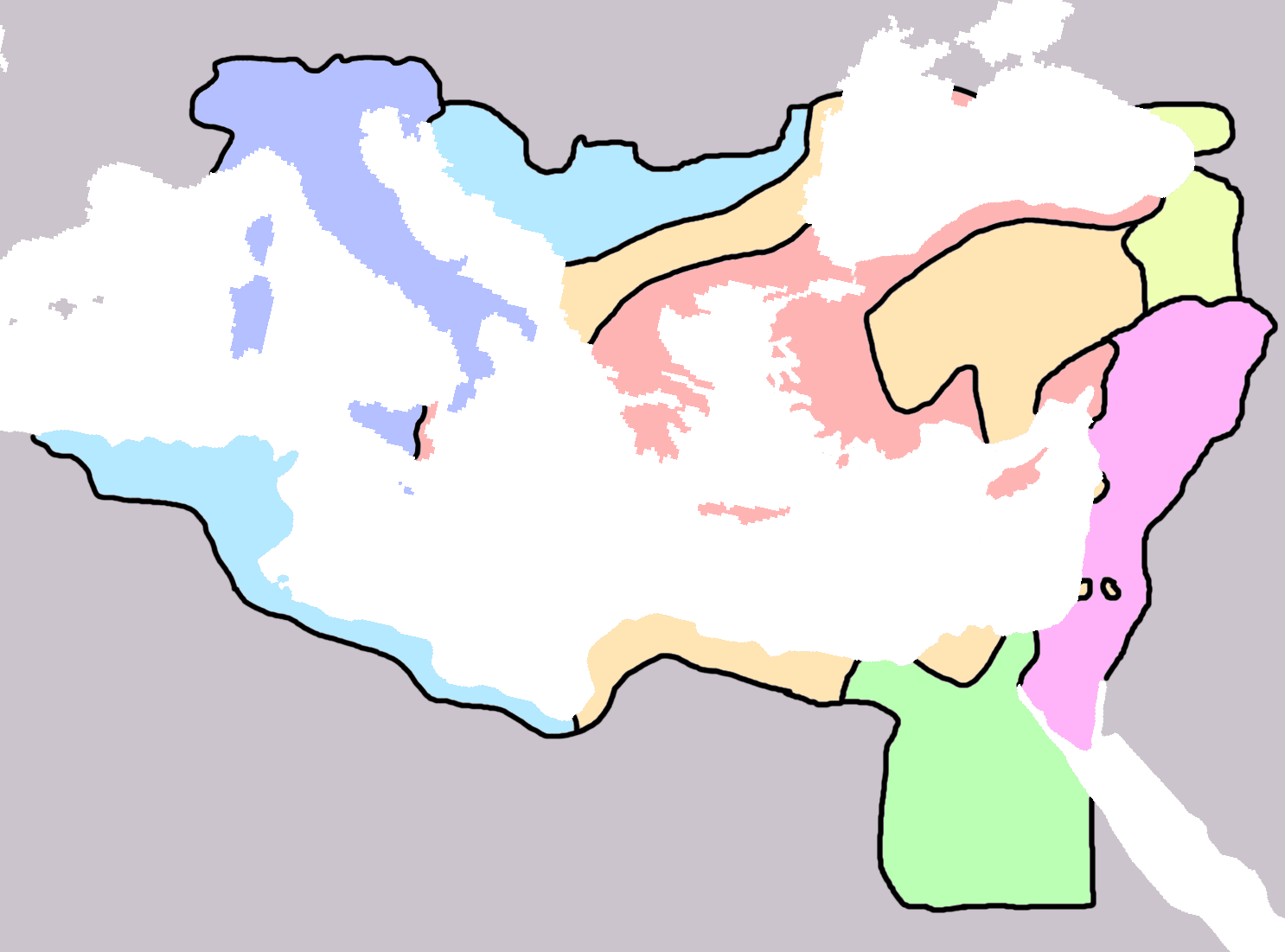
A map of the language divisions within the Byzantine Empire during the reign of Justinian I Greek Greek and native Latin Latin and native Aramaic Coptic Caucasian and Armenian

Language geography is the branch of human geography that studies the geographic distribution of language(s) or its constituent elements. Linguistic geography can also refer to studies of how people talk about the landscape. For example, toponymy is the study of place names. Landscape ethnoecology, also known as ethnophysiography, is the study of landscape ontologies and how they are expressed in language.

There are two principal fields of study within the geography of language:

1. geography of languages, which deals with the distribution through history and space of languages, and/or is concerned with 'the analysis of the distribution patterns and spatial structures of languages in contact'.
2. geolinguistics being, when used as a sub-discipline of geography, the study of the 'political, economic and cultural processes that affect the status and distribution of languages'. When perceived as a sub-discipline of linguistics that incorporates contact linguistics, one definition appearing has been 'the study of languages and dialects in contact and in conflict with various societal, economic, ideological, political and other contemporary trends with regard to a particular geographic location and on a planetary scale'.

Various other terms and subdisciplines have been suggested, but none gained much currency, including:

- linguistic geography, which deals with regional linguistic variations within languages, also called dialect geography, which some consider a subdivision of geolinguistics
- a division within the examination of linguistic geography separating the studies of change over time and space;

Many studies in what is now called contact linguistics have researched the effect of language contact, as the languages or dialects (varieties) of peoples have interacted. This territorial expansion of language groups has usually resulted in the overlaying of languages upon existing speech areas, rather than the replacement of one language by another. For example, after the Norman Conquest of England, Old French became the language of the aristocracy but Middle English remained the language of a majority of the population.

== Linguistic geography ==
Linguistic geography, as a field, is dominated by linguists rather than geographers. Charles W. J. Withers describes the difference as resulting from a focus on "elements of language, and only then with their geographical or social variation, as opposed to investigation of the processes making for change in the extent of language areas." Peter Trudgill says, "linguistic geography has been geographical only in the sense that it has been concerned with the spatial distribution of linguistic phenomena." Greater emphasis has been laid upon explanation rather than mere description of the patterns of linguistic change. That move has paralleled similar concerns in geography and language studies. Some studies have paid attention to the social use of language and to variations in dialect within languages in regard to social class or occupation. Regarding such variations, lexicographer Robert Burchfield notes that their nature "is a matter of perpetual discussion and disagreement" and notes that "most professional linguistic scholars regard it as axiomatic that all varieties of English have a sufficiently large vocabulary for the expression of all the distinctions that are important in the society using it." He contrasts this with the view of the historian John Vincent, who regards such a view as

"a nasty little orthodoxy among the educational and linguistic establishment. However badly you need standard English, you will have the merits of non-standard English waved at you. The more extravagantly your disadvantages will be lauded as 'entirely adequate for the needs of their speakers', to cite the author of Sociolinguistics. It may sound like a radical cry to support pidgin, patois, or dialect, but translated into social terms, it looks more like a ploy to keep Them (whoever Them may be) out of the middle-class suburbs."

— John Vincent, The Times

Burchfield concludes, "Resolution of such opposite views is not possible.... future of dialect studies and the study of class-marked distinctions are likely to be of considerable interest to everyone."

In England, linguistic geography has traditionally focused upon rural English, rather than urban English. A common production of linguistic investigators of dialects is the shaded and dotted map showing to show where one linguistic feature ends and another begins or overlaps. Various compilations of these maps for England have been issued over the years, including Joseph Wright's English Dialect Dictionary (1896–1905), the Survey of English Dialects (1962–8), and The Linguistic Atlas of England (1978).

== Geolinguistic organizations ==
Most geolinguistic organizations identify themselves as associations of linguists rather than of geographers. This includes the two oldest which both date to 1965 with "Amici Linguarum" (language friends) being founded by Erik V. Gunnemark and The American Society of Geolinguistics by Mario A. Pei. The research in geolinguistics which these organizations and others, which are more geographically oriented, promote is often interdisciplinary, being at times simultaneously both linguistic and geographic, and also being at times linked to other sub-disciplines of linguistics as well as going beyond linguistics to connect to sociology, anthropology, ethnology, history, demographics, political science, studies of cognition and communication, etc.

== See also ==
- Dialect continuum
- Language policy
- Linguistic ecology
- Linguistic landscape
- Linguistic map
- Linguistic rights
- Sprachbund
