= José María Sánchez Carrión =

Spanish linguist

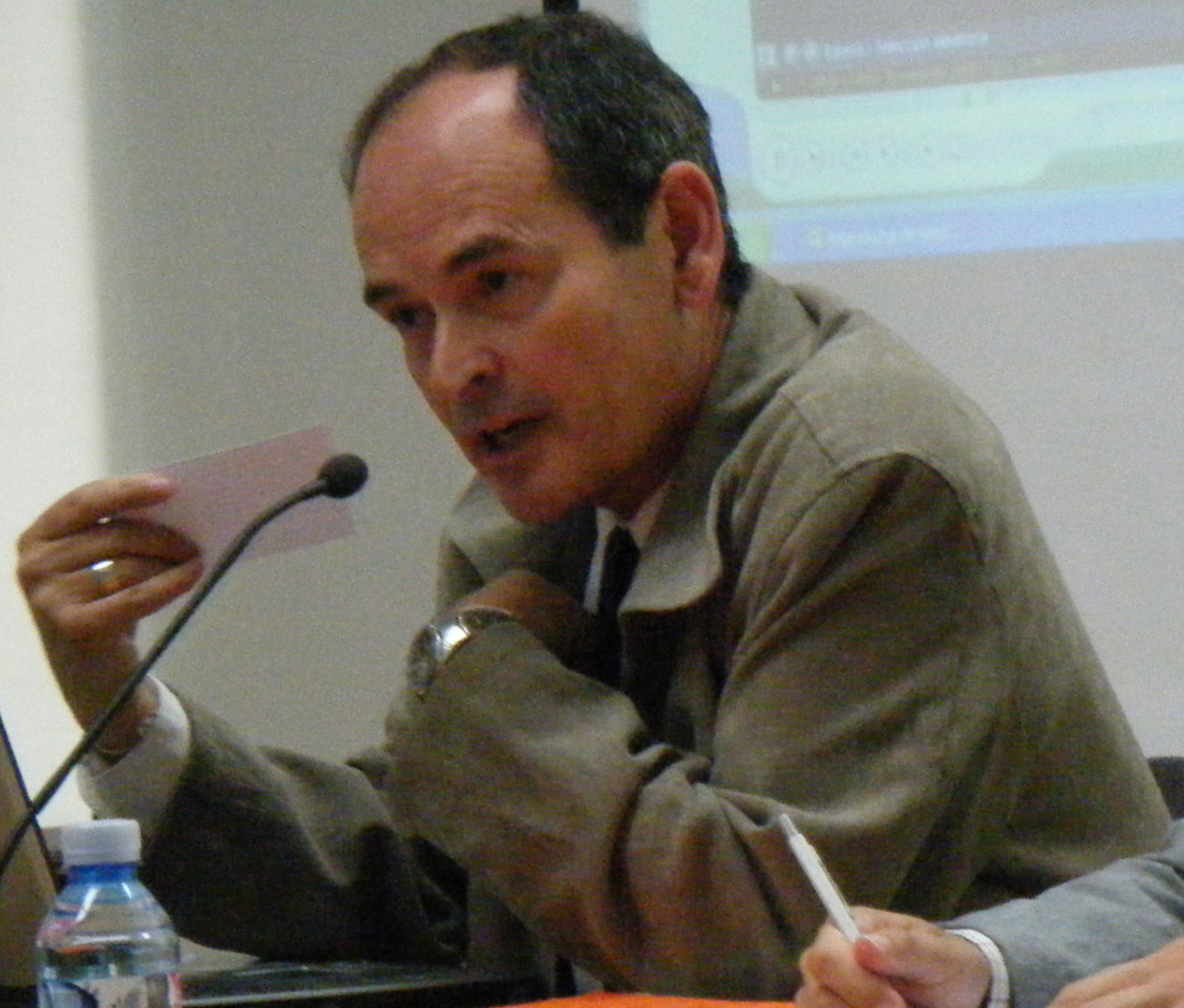
José María Sánchez Carrión July 2011

José María Sánchez Carrión (born 1952, in Cartagena) is a Spanish linguist, specialised in Basque language, sociolinguistics and historical linguistics. He is an associate member of Euskaltzaindia since 1983. Despite being arguably the best known local academic proponent of reversing language shift measures, he has never held a stable university post in the Basque Country.

Nicknamed Txepetx ("Wren" in Basque language), he is an Anglo-Germanic philology graduate from the University of Salamanca and Basque philology doctorate from the University of the Basque Country, he has served as a Spanish teacher in Scotland, scientific English teacher at the University of Granada, Basque teacher in a rural school of Navarre, and professor of modern languages and literature of secondary education in the Basque Autonomous Community and elsewhere in Spain.

His research on sociolinguistics, the theory of bilingualism and existential linguistics includes the following works: El estado actual del vascuence en la provincia de Navarra (1970) [The current state of Basque language in Navarre (1970)] (1972), "Bilingüismo, diglosia y contacto de lenguas" [Bilingualism, diglossia, and language contact] (ASJU, 1974), Lengua y pueblo [Language and people] (1980) with articles from 1977 originally published in Punto y Hora de Euskal Herria magazine, "El marco sociológico y espacial en una situación bilingüe" [The sociological and spatial context in a bilingual setting] (UPV/EHU, 1980), and El espacio bilingüe [The bilingual space] (1981).

Sánchez Carrión's insistence on the necessity of compacting Basque speakers has been often cited by advocates of the territorial principle of linguistic rights. Significantly the only article in the 1982 Basque Autonomous Community Law for the Normalisation of the use of the Basque language based on the territorial principle, was declared unconstitutional by the Constitutional Court of Spain.

Far removed from the variational sociolinguistics as from ideological interpretations, he attempts to answer with new perspectives to the problem of why and how languages live and die. He's been a proponent of ecolinguistics since the mid-1980s. However, his most notorious work is his doctoral thesis Un futuro para nuestro pasado [A future for our past] (1987), as it has offered to many Basque language loyalists a theoretical framework for their activity. Further expanding the sociohistorical linguistics approach of his doctoral thesis, he wrote "Las lenguas vistas desde la historia versus la historia vista desde las lenguas" [Languages seen from the point of view of history versus history seen from the point of view of languages] (EI-SEV, 1992). In 1999 the Bilbao City Council published Sánchez Carrión's book Aplicación sociolingüística de la territorialidad [Sociolinguistic application of territoriality].

Sánchez Carrión's importance for the Basque studies was stressed early on by scholar Koldo Mitxelena, and this acknowledgment has continued thereafter. The Basque association Garabide Elkartea participated in the United Nations Permanent Forum on Indigenous Issues in April 2010, where it presented the book The Basque experience, which makes extensive use of Sánchez Carrión's sociolinguistics.

In 2013 he published a book about religion and theology entitled Le code Jean le Baptiste [Code John the Baptist] translated into French by Alain Masson.

== Works ==
- 1972. El estado actual del vascuence en la provincia de Navarra (1970): factores de regresión, relaciones de bilingüismo. Pamplona: Institución Príncipe de Viana. ISBN 978-84-7016-047-9
- 1980. Lengua y pueblo. San Sebastián: Elkar. ISBN 978-84-85485-21-5
- 1981. El espacio bilingüe: aspectos etnolingüísticos del bilingüismo y teoría lingüística de los espacios. Burlada: Sociedad de Estudios Vascos. ISBN 978-84-300-5151-9
- 1987. Un futuro para nuestro pasado: claves de la recuperación del euskara y teoría social de las lenguas. Estella: Self-published. ISBN 978-84-398-9781-1
- 1991. Un futuro para nuestro pasado: claves de la recuperación del euskara y teoría social de las lenguas, 2nd ed. San Sebastián: Seminario de Filología Vasca "Julio de Urquijo". ISBN 978-84-398-6972-6
- 1999a. Aplicación sociolingüística de la territorialidad: márgenes de encuentro, Bilbao y el euskara: sistemas modélicos de interpretación, modelos sistémicos de actuación. Bilbao: Ayuntamiento de Bilbao. OCLC 863161564
- 1999b. Lengua y pueblo, 2nd ed. Pamplona: Pamiela. ISBN 978-84-7681-314-0
- 2000. Bizi + Hitza Fundazioa = Fundación Hololingüística. Bilbao: Bizi + Hitza Fundazioa.
- 2013. Le code Jean le Baptiste. Beaumont-Pied-de-Boeuf: NVA. ISBN 978-2-9526562-2-1
- 2017. Ascesis de la luz escrita: el lenguaje de la luz (III). Madrid: Bizi+Hitza Fundazioa = Fundación Vida y Lenguas. ISBN 8494797212
- 2019. El lenguaje de la luz: el código "Jesús el Cristo". Roquetas de Mar: Círculo Rojo. ISBN 9788413317281
- 2023. Le code Jésus le Christ . Beaumont-Pied-de-Boeuf: NVA. ISBN 978-2-9526562-3-8
