= Yukio Tsuda (professor) =

Japanese communication theorist (born 1950)

- Born: Yukio Tsuda; Kanagawa, Japan
- Occupation(s): Professor, researcher, educator

Education
- Education: B.A., Yokohama National University; M.A., Southern Illinois University; Ph.D., Southern Illinois University
- Alma mater: Southern Illinois University

Philosophical work
- Notable works: Language Inequality and Distortion in Intercultural Communication
- Notable ideas: The hegemony of English, the ecology of language

Yukio Tsuda (津田 幸男, Tsuda Yukio; born 1950 in Kanagawa Prefecture) is Professor Emeritus in the Graduate School of Humanities and Social Sciences at the University of Tsukuba and Director of the Institute of Peace Linguistics. He is also Professor in the Department of English at Matsuyama University.

== Education and career ==
Tsuda was born in Kanagawa, Japan in 1950. He majored in English and graduated from Yokohama National University in 1973. He received his M.A. in TEFL (Teaching English as a Foreign Language) in 1978 and his Ph.D. in Speech Communication in 1985 from Southern Illinois University at Carbondale.

Tsuda held several faculty positions in his academic career. He was associate professor in the Faculty of Economics at Nagasaki University from 1986 to 1988. He then moved to Nagoya University where he was associate professor in the Institute of Languages and Cultures from 1988 to 1993 and Professor in the Department of International Communication and in the Graduate School of International Development from 1993 to 2001.

Tsuda had been Professor in the Doctoral Program in Modern Cultures and Public Policies in the Graduate School of Humanities and Social Sciences at the University of Tsukuba since 2001. He retired from the University of Tsukuba and founded the Institute of Peace Linguistics in Ibaraki Prefecture in 2014. He is currently Professor in the Department of English at Matsuyama University in Ehime Prefecture.

Tsuda was Visiting Professor at the International Research Center for Japanese Studies in Kyoto in 1996 and at the College of San Mateo in California in 2007. He was also Braj Kachru Fellow in the "Internationalization Forum" program in 1996 and Visiting Fellow in 1999 at the East-West Center in Honolulu, Hawaii.

Tsuda's academic interests include language policy, cross-cultural psychoanalysis, and international and intercultural communication. Among his publications are Language Inequality and Distortion in Intercultural Communication: A Critical Theory Approach (John Benjamins, 1986), Language, Education, and Intercultural Communication (Nagasaki University, 1988), Eigo Shihai-no Kouzou [The Structure of the Dominance of English] (Daisan Shokan, 1990), Shinryaku-suru Eigo, Hangeki-suru Nihongo [The Invading English, The Counter-Attacking Japanese] (PHP Institute, 1996), and Eigo Shihai-to Kotoba-no Byoudou [The Hegemony of English and Linguistic Equality] (Keio University Press, 2006).

== The Ecology of Language Paradigm ==
Tsuda is well known as a critic of the hegemony of English and as an advocate of linguistic and cultural pluralism. He believes that the domination of English is tantamount to linguicism and linguicide, and that addressing the problem of linguistic hegemony is crucial to the development of human and cultural security. In an article in The San Matean, a San Mateo Community College newspaper, dated March 19, 2007, Tsuda was quoted to say: "It is more important to be students learning other languages than being a teacher only teaching one." He proposed the "ecology of language" paradigm as opposed to the "diffusion of English" paradigm.

The Diffusion of English Paradigm, which is a dominant position not only in the Anglo-American world but also in the former British colonies in Asia and Africa, is characterized by theoretical orientations such as capitalism, science and technology, modernization, monolingualism, ideological globalization and internationalization, transnationalization, Americanization, the homogenization of the world culture, and linguistic, cultural, and media imperialism. In contrast, an alternative theoretical orientation critical of the Diffusion of English Paradigm is what I call the "Ecology of Language Paradigm." This paradigm is based on the theoretical positions such as the human rights perspective, equality in communication, multilingualism, the maintenance of languages and cultures, the protection of national sovereignties, and the promotion of foreign language education.

Tsuda urges international and intercultural communication scholars to recognize the hegemony of English as a subject of academic inquiry in the fields especially in the English-speaking countries. He also suggests that English-language teaching professionals incorporate the ecology of language paradigm into the contents and methods of teaching as well as teacher education. Finally, he insists that both native speakers and non-native speakers of English learn the philosophy of the ecology of language so that they will become more sensitive to the ethical aspects of international and intercultural communication.

== Publications ==
- Tsuda, Y. (1992). The dominance of English and linguistic discrimination. Media Development, 34(1), 32–34.
- Tsuda, Y. (1993). Communication in English: Is it anti-cultural? Journal of Development Communication, 4(1), 69–78.
- Tsuda, Y. (1994). The diffusion of English: Its impact on culture and communication. Keio Communication Review, 16, 49–61.
- Tsuda, Y. (1997). Hegemony of English vs. Ecology of Language: Building equality in international communication. In L. E. Smith & M. L. Forman (Eds.), World Englishes 2000: Selected essays (pp. 21–31). Honolulu, HI: College of Language, Linguistics and Literature, University of Hawaii and the East-West Center.
- Tsuda, Y. (1998). Critical studies on the dominance of English and the implications for international communication. Japan Review, 10, 219–236.
- Tsuda, Y. (2000). Envisioning a democratic linguistic order. TESL Reporter, 33(1), 32–38.
- Tsuda, Y. (2000). The maintenance of the Korean language and identity in Japan. Studies in the Linguistic Sciences, 30(1), 219–227.
- Tsuda, Y. (2001). "World Englishes" as critical theory or ideology? Keio Communication Review, 23, 3-19.
- Tsuda, Y. (2002). The hegemony of English: Problems, opposing views, and communication rights. In G. Mazzaferro (Ed.), The English language and power (pp. 19–31). Alessandria, Italy: Edizionoi dell’Orso.
- Tsuda, Y. (2008). English hegemony and English divide. China Media Research, 4(1), 47–55.
- Tsuda, Y. (2010). Speaking against the hegemony of English: Problems, ideologies, and solutions. In T. K. Nakayama & R. T. Halualani (Eds.), The handbook of critical intercultural communication (pp. 248–269). West Sussex, UK: Wiley-Blackwell.
- Tsuda, Y. (2014). The hegemony of English and strategies for linguistic pluralism: Proposing the Ecology of Language Paradigm. In M. K. Asante, Y. Miike, & J. Yin (Eds.), The global intercultural communication reader (2nd ed., pp. 445–456). New York, NY: Routledge.

== See also ==
- Critical applied linguistics
- Ecolinguistics
- English as a second or foreign language
- International English
- Language death
- Linguistic discrimination
- Language planning
- Language policy
- Linguistic imperialism
- Language rights
- Multilingualism
