= The American Society of Geolinguistics =

The American Society of Geolinguistics is the oldest organization devoted exclusively to research in the field of geolinguistics with the definition given by the Society to the term geolinguistics, currently being: "An academic discipline involving the analysis and implications of the geographical location, distribution and structure of language varieties within a temporal framework, either in isolation or in contact and/or conflict with one another, being originally conceived of by Mario Pei as being a branch of linguistics which would be used to do objective-oriented research on real-life language issues and where interdisciplinary approaches would be acceptable."

== Mission ==
The Society's slogan is "Geolinguistics for the Americas and elsewhere". The mission statement of the Society states that "The mission of the Society is to gather and disseminate up-to-date knowledge concerning the world`s present-day languages, dialects, and other language varieties in the context of their distribution and use, their relative practical importance, their perceived usefulness and actual availability from economic, political and cultural standpoints, their genetic, historical and geographical affiliations and relationships, and their identification and use in spoken and written form. The Society, as such, has varying degrees of interest in linguistic geography, languages in contact and conflict, language planning and policy, language education and the broader aspects of sociolinguistics."

== Organization ==
=== Membership ===
Membership in The American Society of Geolinguistics is open to anyone but is not a pre-requirement for submitting articles for publication.

=== Presidents emeriti ===
Past and present presidents emeriti of the Society are Mario A. Pei, William F. Marquardt, Fedor I. Nikanov, Abraham Tauber, Mimi (Mary F.) Delcuve, Allen Walker Read, Irving Linn, Jesse Levitt, William C. Woolfson, Max Oppenheimer, Jr., Marcelle Altieri, Kenneth H. Rogers, Alexander Milic, Margaret M. Bryant, Etta Sibalis, Frances Lyman, Abraham Taffel, Gloria Taylor, Leonard R. N. Ashley, and Julius Balbin.

=== Officers and directors ===
Its officers consist of a president, a first vice president, a second vice president, a secretary, and a treasurer. The officers are assisted by a board of directors. The Society's activities in the United States are taken care of by its secretary in New York. The secretary has authority which includes the management of all domestic conferences and publications. Conferences and publications committees which seek to promote the work of the Society outside of the United States exist under the authority of the Society's president, though, with regard to foreign publications, the secretary and president act together as joint editors in chief.

== History ==
The American Society of Geolinguistics was founded in January 1965 by Professor Mario Pei. Monthly meetings were held to discuss to discuss different languages and their relationship to where they were and to the effect this might have on neighboring areas. Geolinguistics was used to describe this area of academic interest. The word was not originally associated with the idea of language map-making, but had been suggested to him during World War II by a student of his who suggested to him that a new academic discipline was needed which should be called ‘geolinguistics’ by analogy with ‘geopolitics.’” In 1974 the Society began publishing its journal Geolinguistics. In 1985, it held its first international conference under the initiative of its president (now President Emeritus), Professor Leonard R. N. Ashley, in New York. In 2015, by the initiative of Professor Wayne Finke of Baruch College (City University of New York), it held its first international conference abroad in Tokyo and dedicated the proceedings of this conference to its long-serving president, Leonard R. N. Ashley.

== Conferences and meetings ==
=== Domestic ===
The Society holds an annual luncheon in New York for officers and other members.

=== International ===
International conferences, open to members and non-members alike, have been held in New York since 1985 and since the beginning of the 21st century on an annual basis. Similar conferences have likewise been held in Tokyo on an annual basis since 2015.

== Publications ==
Geolinguistics, the journal of the American Society of Geolinguistics, has been published since 1974. Conference proceedings have been published since 1987 for international conferences held in New York and since 2015 for international conferences held in Tokyo.
