= Punto y Hora de Euskal Herria =

Former Basque newspaper

- Editor: Sanchez Erauskin
- Founded: 1976
- Ceased publication: 1990
- Country: Spain

Punto y Hora de Euskal Herria was a weekly Basque Country periodical.

The periodical was established in Pamplona, under the direction of Mirentxu Purroy Ferrer, and the first issue was published in April 1976. The newspaper operated from 1976 to 1990.

One of its collaborators was the linguist José María Sánchez Carrión.

In January 1979 it was closed. In April of that year they began a new phase under a new director, Javier Sánchez Erauskin, and based in San Sebastian.

In November 1981, its then-editor Javier Sanchez Erauskin was sentenced for insulting the Spanish King Juan Carlos I to six months and one day imprisonment.
