= Spoom =

Type of sorbet

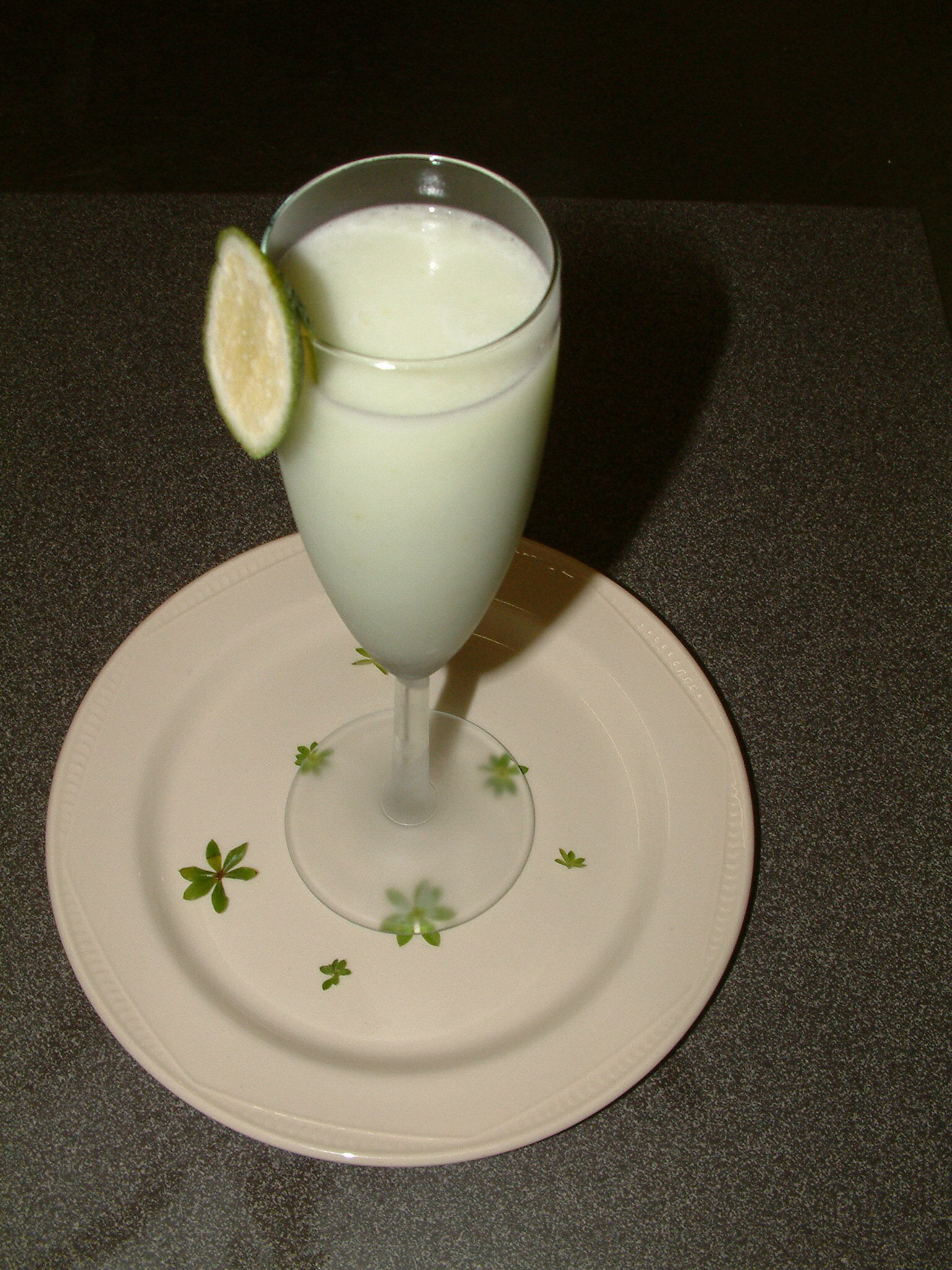
- A glass of lime-flavoured spoom
- Type: Sorbet
- Main ingredients: Fruit juice; wine, sherry or port; champagne

Spoom is a type of frothy sorbet made with a lighter sugar syrup than that required for a true sorbet. As it begins to set, it is mixed with half its volume of Italian meringue. Like sorbet, it is made from fruit juice, wine, sherry or port and served in a tall glass (with a few tablespoons of champagne spooned over it). The name comes from the Italian word spuma, meaning 'foam'. In Italy, spumoni is a light frothy ice cream made with egg whites, a flavouring and whipped cream.

== See also ==
- Spumoni
