= Language development =

Process of language acquisition

Language development in humans is a process which starts early in life. Infants start without knowing a language, yet by 10 months, babies can distinguish speech sounds and engage in babbling. Some research has shown that the earliest learning begins in utero when the fetus starts to recognize the sounds and speech patterns of its mother's voice and differentiate them from other sounds after birth.

Children develop receptive language abilities before their verbal or expressive language develops. Receptive language (language perception) enables internal processing and understanding of language. For instance, six-month-old infants understand the meaning of basic words (such as banana or hand).

Expressive language (language production) is considered to begin with a stage of pre-verbal communication in which infants use gestures and vocalizations to make their intents known to others. According to a general principle of development, new forms then take over old functions, so that children learn words to express the same communicative functions they had already expressed by proverbial means.

Children learn syntax through imitation, instruction, and reinforcement.

== Theoretical frameworks ==
Language development is thought to proceed by ordinary processes of learning in which children acquire the forms, meanings, and uses of words and utterances from the linguistic input. Children often begin reproducing the words that they are repetitively exposed to. The method in which we develop language skills is universal; however, the major debate is how the rules of syntax are acquired. There are two quite separate major theories of syntactic development: an empiricist account by which children learn all syntactic rules from the linguistic input, and a nativist approach by which some principles of syntax are innate and are transmitted through the human genome.

The nativist theory, proposed by Noam Chomsky, argues that language is a unique human accomplishment, and can be attributed to either "millions of years of evolution" or to "principles of neural organization that may be even more deeply grounded in physical law". Chomsky says that all children have what is called an innate language acquisition device (LAD). Theoretically, the LAD is an area of the brain that has a set of universal syntactic rules for all languages. This device provides children with the ability to make sense of knowledge and construct novel sentences with minimal external input and little experience. Chomsky's claim is based upon the view that what children hear—their linguistic input—is insufficient to explain how they come to learn language. He argues that linguistic input from the environment is limited and full of errors. Therefore, nativists assume that it is impossible for children to learn linguistic information solely from their environment. However, because children possess this LAD, they are in fact, able to learn language despite incomplete information from their environment. Their capacity to learn language is also attributed to the theory of universal grammar (UG), which posits that a certain set of structural rules are innate to humans, independent of sensory experience. This view has dominated linguistic theory for over fifty years and remains highly influential, as witnessed by the number of articles in journals and books.

The empiricist theory suggests, contra Chomsky, that there is enough information in the linguistic input children receive and therefore, there is no need to assume an innate language acquisition device exists (see above). Rather than a LAD evolved specifically for language, empiricists believe that general brain processes are sufficient for language acquisition. During this process, it is necessary for the child to actively engage with their environment. For a child to learn language, the parent or caregiver adopts a particular way of appropriately communicating with the child; this is known as child-directed speech (CDS). CDS is used so that children are given the necessary linguistic information needed for their language. Empiricism is a general approach and sometimes goes along with the interactionist approach. Statistical language acquisition, which falls under empiricist theory, suggests that infants acquire language by means of pattern perception.

Other researchers embrace an interactionist perspective, consisting of social-interactionist theories of language development. In such approaches, children learn language in the interactive and communicative context, learning language forms for meaningful moves of communication. These theories focus mainly on the caregiver's attitudes and attentiveness to their children in order to promote productive language habits.

An older empiricist theory, the behaviorist theory proposed by B. F. Skinner suggested that language is learned through operant conditioning, namely, by imitation of stimuli and by reinforcement of correct responses. This perspective has not been widely accepted at any time, but by some accounts, is experiencing a resurgence. New studies use this theory now to treat individuals diagnosed with autism spectrum disorders. Additionally, relational frame theory is growing from the behaviorist theory, which is important for acceptance and commitment therapy. Some empiricist theory accounts today use behaviorist models.

Other relevant theories about language development include Piaget's theory of cognitive development, which considers the development of language as a continuation of general cognitive development and Vygotsky's social theories that attribute the development of language to an individual's social interactions and growth.

== Biological preconditions ==
Evolutionary biologists are skeptical of the claim that syntactic knowledge is transmitted in the human genome. However, many researchers claim that the ability to acquire such a complicated system is unique to the human species. Non-biologists also tend to believe that our ability to learn spoken language may have been developed through the evolutionary process and that the foundation for language may be passed down genetically. The ability to speak and understand human language requires speech production skills and abilities as well as multisensory integration of sensory processing abilities.

Scientists have conducted extensive research to see if other animal species are capable of learning a complex human language. Several studies have worked with great apes, owing to their close evolutionary relationship to humans. In the documentary Project Nim, for example, researcher Herbert S. Terrace conducted the study to nurture a young chimpanzee with intimate human interaction. The researchers trained the chimp American Sign Language and treated it like a human child. Finally, the chimp was able to learn over 114 signs to communicate his wants to the caregivers. Unlike humans, however, Nim was unable to make use of significant grammar or context. Other attempts to teach great apes language have met with varying degrees of success, and whether the communication the apes achieve can be equated to human language is controversial.

One hotly debated issue is whether the biological contribution includes capacities specific to language acquisition, often referred to as universal grammar. For fifty years, linguist Noam Chomsky has argued for the hypothesis that children have innate, language-specific abilities that facilitate and constrain language learning. In particular, he has proposed that humans are biologically prewired to learn language at a certain time and in a certain way, arguing that children are born with a language acquisition device (LAD). However, since he developed the minimalist program, his latest version of theory of syntactic structure, Chomsky has reduced the elements of universal grammar, which he believes are prewired in humans to just the principle of recursion, thus voiding most of the nativist endeavor.

Researchers who believe that grammar is learned rather than innate, have hypothesized that language learning results from general cognitive abilities and the interaction between learners and their human interactants. Based on studies of the developing visual system by Torsten Wiesel and David Hubel, it has been suggested that the environment guides the development of language networks in the brain by selecting the neurons and their synapses that are most active during the prolonged early development of humans in a socio-linguistic environment. According to this theory, the neural substrate for language results from a combination of the genetically determined complexity of the human brain and the 'functional validation of synapses' during the long period of postnatal maturation that is unique among primates. Similarly, it has recently been suggested that the relatively slow development of the prefrontal cortex in humans may be one reason that humans are able to learn language, whereas other species are not. Further research has indicated the influence of the FOXP2 gene.

== Stages ==
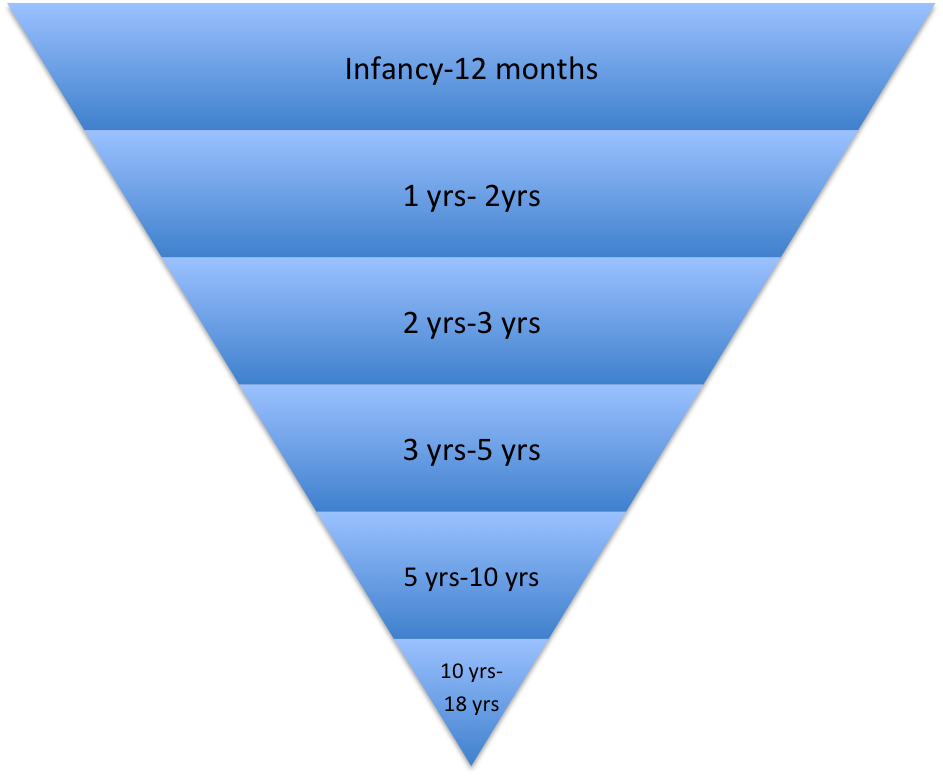
Relationship between interpersonal communication and the stages of development. The greatest development of language occurs in the stage of infancy. As the child matures, the rate of language development decreases.

0–1 years of age:

An infant mainly uses non-verbal communication (mostly gestures) to communicate. For a newborn, crying is the only means of communication. Infants 1–5 months old have different tones of crying that indicate their emotions. Infants also begin laughing at this stage. At 6–7 months old, infants begin to respond to their own name, yell and squeal, and distinguish emotions based on the tone of voice of the parent. Between 7 and 10 months the infant starts putting words together, for example "mama" and "dada", but these words lack meaning and significance. Verbal communication begins at approximately 10–12 months, and the child starts to imitate any sounds they hear, for example animal sounds. The non-verbal communication of infants includes the use of gaze, head orientation and body positioning. Gestures are also widely used as an act of communication. All these stages can be delayed if the parents do not communicate with their infant on a daily basis.

Nonverbal communication begins with the comprehension of parents and how they use it effectively in conversation. Infants are able to break down what adults and others are saying to them and use their comprehension of this communication to produce their own.

1–2 years of age:

Verbal and nonverbal communication are both used at this stage of development. At 12 months, children start to repeat the words they hear. Adults, especially parents, are used as a point of reference for children in terms of the sound of words and what they mean in context of the conversation. Children learn much of their verbal communication through repetition and observing others. If parents do not speak to their children at this age it can become quite difficult for them to learn the essentials of conversation. The vocabulary of a 1–2-year-old should consist of 50 words and can be up to 500. Gestures that were used earlier on in development begin to be replaced by words and eventually are only used when needed. Verbal communication is chosen over nonverbal as development progresses.

2–3 years of age:

Children aged 2–3 communicate best in a turn-taking style. This creates a conversational structure that makes it easier for verbal communication to develop. It also teaches patience, kindness, and respect as they learn from the direction of elders that one person should speak at a time. This creates interactional synchrony during their preverbal routines that shapes their interpersonal communication skills early on in their development. Children during this stage in their life also go through a recognition and continuity phase. Children start to see that shared awareness is a factor in communication along with their development of symbolic direction of language. This especially affects the relationship between the child and the caregiver; it is a crucial part of self-discovery for the child when they begin to take ownership over their own actions in a continuous manner.

3–5 years of age:

In this age group children are still learning how to form abstract thoughts and are still communicating concretely. Children begin to be fluent in connecting sounds, syllables, and linking words that make sense together in one thought. They begin to participate in short conversations with others. Stuttering can develop, generally resulting in slowed-down speech with a few letter enunciation errors (f, v, s, z). At the beginning of this stage toddlers tend to be missing function words and misunderstand how to use verb tenses. Over time they start including functional words, pronouns, and auxiliary verbs. This is the stage at which most children can pick up on emotional cues of the tone of adults' conversation. If negative feedback is distinguished by the child, this ends with fear and avoidance of the associated verbal and nonverbal cues. Toddlers develop the skills to listen and partially understand what another person is saying and can develop an appropriate response.

5–10 years of age:

Much language development during this time period takes place in a school setting. At the beginning of the school age years, a child's vocabulary expands through exposure to reading, which also helps children to learn more difficult grammatical forms, including plurals and pronouns. They also begin to develop metalinguistic awareness which allows them to reflect and more clearly understand the language they use. They therefore start to understand jokes and riddles. Reading is a gateway for learning new vernacular and having confidence in complex word choices while talking with adults. This is an important developmental stage socially and physiologically for the child. School-aged children can easily be influenced through communication and gestures. As children continue to learn communication, they realize the difference between forms of intentions and understand that there are numerous different ways to express the same intent, with different meaning.

10–18 years of age:

By the age of 10, the child's cognitive potential has matured and they can participate fully and understand the purpose of their conversations. During this time, the sophistication and effectiveness of communication skills increase and understanding of vocabulary and grammar increases as a result of education. Adolescents go through changes in social interactions and cognitive development that influence the way they communicate. They often use colloquial speech (slang), however, which can increase confusion and misunderstandings. An individual's style of interpersonal communication depends on who they are communicating with. Their relationships change influencing how they communicate with others. During this period, adolescents tend to communicate less with their parents and more with their friends. When discussions are initiated in different channels of communication, attitude and predispositions are key factors that drive the individual to discuss their feelings. This also shows that respect in communication is a trait in interpersonal communication that is built on throughout development. The end of this adolescent stage is the basis for communication in the adult stage.

== Gender differences ==
=== Children versus adults ===
Language development and processing begins before birth. Evidence has shown that there is language development occurring antepartum. DeCasper and Spence performed a study in 1986 by having mothers read aloud during the last few weeks of pregnancy. When the infants were born, they were then tested. They were read aloud a story while sucking on a pacifier; the story was either the story read by the mother when the infant was in utero or a new story. The pacifier used was able to determine the rate of sucking that the infant was performing. When the story that the mother had read before was heard, the sucking of the pacifier was modified. This did not occur during the story that the infant had not heard before. The results for this experiment had shown that the infants were able to recognize what they had heard in utero, providing insight that language development had been occurring in the last six weeks of pregnancy.

Throughout the first year of life, infants are unable to communicate with language. Instead, infants communicate with gestures. This phenomenon is known as prelinguistic gestures, which are nonverbal ways that infants communicate that also had a plan backed with the gesture. Examples of these could be pointing at an object, tugging on the shirt of a parent to get the parent's attention, etc. Harding, 1983, devised the major criteria that come along with the behavior of prelinguistic gestures and their intent to communicate. There are three major criteria that go along with a prelinguistic gesture: waiting, persistence, and ultimately, development of alternative plans. This process usually occurs around 8 months of age, where an appropriate scenario may be of a child tugging on the shirt of a parent to wait for the attention of the parent who would then notice the infant, which causes the infant to point to something they desire. This would describe the first two criteria. The development of alternative plans may arise if the parent does not acknowledge what the infant wants, the infant may entertain itself to satisfy the previous desire. The way the parent responds to their child in this situation of "needing" and "wanting" will also result in the kind of attachment style their child will have.

When children reach about 15–18 months of age, language acquisition flourishes. There is a surge in word production resulting from the growth of the cortex. Infants begin to learn the words that form a sentence and within the sentence, the word endings can be interpreted. Elissa Newport and colleagues (1999) found that humans learn first about the sounds of a language, and then move on to how to speak the language. This shows how infants learn the end of a word and know that a new word is being spoken. From this step, infants are then able to determine the structure of a language and word.

It appears that during the early years of language development females exhibit an advantage over males of the same age. When infants between the age of 16 and 22 months were observed interacting with their mothers, a female advantage was obvious. The females in this age range showed more spontaneous speech production than the males and this finding was not due to mothers speaking more with daughters than sons. In addition, boys between 2 and 6 years as a group did not show higher performance in language development over their girl counterparts on experimental assessments. In studies using adult populations, 18 and over, it seems that the female advantage may be task dependent. Depending on the task provided, a female advantage may or may not be present. Similarly, one study found that out of the 5.5% of American children with language impairments, 7.2% are male, and 3.8% are female. There are many different suggested explanations for this gender gap in language impairment prevalence.

=== Lateralization effect on language ===
It is currently believed that in regards to brain lateralization males are left-lateralized, while females are bilateralized. Studies on patients with unilateral lesions have provided evidence that females are in fact more bilateralized with their verbal abilities. It seems that when a female has experienced a lesion to the left hemisphere, she is better able to compensate for this damage than a male can. If a male has a lesion in the left hemisphere, his verbal abilities are greatly impaired in comparison to a control male of the same age without that damage. However, these results may also be task-dependent as well as time-dependent.

=== Fine motor development rate ===
Shriberg, Tomblin, and McSweeny (1999) suggest that the fine motor skills necessary for correct speech may develop more slowly in males. This could explain why some of the language impairments in young males seem to spontaneously improve over time.

=== Over-diagnosis ===
It is also suggested that the gender gap in language impairment prevalence could also be explained by the clinical over diagnosis of males. Males tend to be clinically over diagnosed with a variety of disorders. A late 1990s study found that males were diagnosed with language impairment 1.5 times more than were females.

=== Visibility ===
The study by Shriber et al. (1999) further explains that this gap in the prevalence of language impairment could be because males tend to be more visible. These researchers reveal that male children tend to act out behaviorally when they have any sort of disorder, while female children tend to turn inward and develop emotional disorders as well. Thus, the high ratio of males with language impairments may be connected with the fact that males are more visible, and thus more often diagnosed.

== Writing development ==
Research in writing development has been limited in psychology. In the research that has been conducted, focus has generally centred on the development of written and spoken language and their connection. Spoken and written skills could be considered linked. Researchers believe that children's spoken language influences their written language. When a child learns to write they need to master letter formation, spelling, punctuation and they also have to gain an understanding of the structure and the organisational patterns involved in written language.

Kroll's theory is one of the most significant on children's writing development. He proposed that children's writing development is split into four phases. Kroll explicitly states that these phases are 'artificial' in the sense that the boundaries between the phases are imprecise and he recognises that each child is different, thus their development is unique. The phases of writing development have been highlighted to give the reader a broad outline of what phases a child goes through during writing development; however when studying an individual's development in depth, the phases may be disregarded to an extent.

The first of Kroll's phases is the preparation for writing phase. In this phase the child is believed to grasp the technical skills needed for writing, allowing them to create the letters needed to write the words the children say. In this initial phase children experience many opportunities to extend their spoken language skills. Speaking and writing are considered fairly separate processes here, as children's writing is less well developed at this stage, whereas their spoken language is becoming more skilled.

Kroll considers the second phase in writing development to be consolidation. Here, children begin to consolidate spoken and written language. In this phase children's writing skills rely heavily on their spoken language skills, and their written and spoken language becoming integrated. Children's written language skills become stronger as they use their spoken language skills to improve their writing. Then in turn, when a development in children's written language skills is seen, their spoken language skills have also improved. A child's written language in this phase mirrors their spoken language.

In the third phase, differentiation, children begin to learn that written language regularly differs in structure and style from spoken language. The growth from consolidation to differentiation can be challenging for some children to grasp. Children can 'struggle with the transformation from the basically overt language of speech to the essentially covert activity of writing'. In this phase, the child learns that writing is generally considered more formal than spoken language, which is thought to be casual and conversational. Here, it is believed that children begin to understand that writing serves a purpose.

Kroll considers the last phase to be the systematic integration phase. A differentiation and integration between the child's speaking and writing can be seen in this phase. This means that speaking and writing have 'well-articulated forms and functions'; however, they are also integrated in the sense that they use the same system. As a result of the individual being aware of the audience, context and reason they are communicating, both written and spoken language are able to overlap and take several forms at this stage.

Kroll used the four phases to give an explanation and generalise about the development of these two aspects of language. The highest significance is placed on the second and third phase, consolidation and differentiation respectively. It could be concluded that children's written and spoken language, in certain respects, become more similar to age, maturation, and experience; however, they are also increasingly different in other respects. The content of the skills are more similar, but the approach used for both writing and speaking are different. When writing and speaking development is looked at more closely it can be seen that certain elements of written and spoken language are differentiating and other elements are integrating, all in the same phase.

Perera conducted a survey and her view mirrors that of Kroll to the extent that she used Kroll's four phases. When a child undergoes initial learning of the written language, they have not yet fully mastered the oral language. It is clear that their written language development is aided by their spoken language; it can also be said that their spoken language development is aided by the development of their written language skills. Kantor and Rubin believe that not all individuals successfully move into the final stage of integration. Perera is also aware that it is hard to assign chronological ages to each phase of writing development, because each child is an individual, and also the phases are 'artificial'.

Other than Kroll's theory, there are four principles on early patterns in writing development discussed by Marie Clay in her book What Did I Write?. The four principles are recurring principle, the generative principle, the sign principle, and the inventory principle. The recurring principle involves patterns and shapes in English writing that develop throughout writing development. The generative principle incorporates the idea that a writer can create new meanings by organizing units of writing and letters of the alphabet. The sign principle is understanding that the word print also involves paper arrangement and word boundaries. And lastly, the inventory principle is the fact that children have the urge to list and name items that they are familiar with, and because of this they can practice their own writing skills.

More recent research has also explored writing development. Myhill concentrated on the development of written language skills in adolescents aged 13 to 15. Myhill discovered that the more mature writer was aware of the shaping of text, and used non-finite clauses, which mirrored Perera's results (1984). Other researchers focused on writing development up until late adolescence, as there has been a limited research in this area. Chrisite and Derewianke recognize that the survey conducted by Perera (1984) is still one of the most significant research studies in the writing development field and believe Perera's study is similar to theirs. Chrisite and Derewianke (2010) again propose four phases of writing development. The researchers believe that the process of writing development does not stop when an individual leaves formal education, and again, the researchers highlight that these phases are flexible in their onset. The first phase focuses on spoken language as the main aid for writing development, and the development then takes its course reaching the fourth phase, which continues beyond formal education.

== Environmental influences ==
The environment a child develops in has influences on language development. The environment provides language input for the child to process. Speech by adults to children help provide the child with correct language usage repetitively. Environmental influences on language development are explored in the tradition of social interactionist theory by such researchers as Jerome Bruner, Alison Gopnik, Andrew Meltzoff, Anat Ninio, Roy Pea, Catherine Snow, Ernest Moerk and Michael Tomasello. Jerome Bruner who laid the foundations of this approach in the 1970s, emphasized that adult "scaffolding" of the child's attempts to master linguistic communication is an important factor in the developmental process.

One component of the young child's linguistic environment is child-directed speech (also known as baby talk or motherese), which is language spoken in a higher pitch than normal with simple words and sentences. Although the importance of its role in developing language has been debated, many linguists think that it may aid in capturing the infant's attention and maintaining communication. When children begin to communicate with adults, this motherese speech allows the child the ability to discern the patterns in language and to experiment with language.

Throughout existing research, it is concluded that children exposed to extensive vocabulary and complex grammatical structures more quickly develop language and also have a more accurate syntax than children raised in environments without complex grammar exposed to them. This is especially true for children with autism, who may have more difficulty acquiring language, that "rich and responsive" language from an adult gives much more support to the development of language. With motherese, the mother talks to the child and responds back to the child, whether it be a babble the child made or a short sentence. While doing this, the adult prompts the child to continue communicating, which may help a child develop language sooner than children raised in environments where communication is not fostered.

Child-directed speech concentrates on small core vocabulary, here and now topics, exaggerated facial expressions and gestures, frequent questioning, para-linguistic changes, and verbal rituals. An infant is least likely to produce vocalizations when changed, fed, or rocked. The infant is more likely to produce vocalizations in response to a nonverbal behavior such as touching or smiling.

Child-directed speech also catches the child's attention, and in situations where words for new objects are being expressed to the child, this form of speech may help the child recognize the speech cues and the new information provided. Data shows that children raised in highly verbal families had higher language scores than those children raised in low verbal families. Continuously hearing complicated sentences throughout language development increases the child's ability to understand these sentences and then to use complicated sentences as they develop. Studies have shown that students enrolled in high language classrooms have two times the growth in complex sentences usage than students in classrooms where teachers do not frequently use complex sentences.

Adults use strategies other than child-directed speech like recasting, expanding, and labeling:

- Recasting is rephrasing something the child has said, perhaps turning it into a question or restating the child's immature utterance in the form of a fully grammatical sentence. For example, a child saying "cookie now" a parent may respond with "Would you like a cookie now?"
- Expanding is restating, in a linguistically sophisticated form, what a child has said. For example, a child may say "car move road" and the parent may respond "A car drives on the road."
- Labeling is identifying the names of objects. If a child points to an object such as a couch the mother may say "couch" in response. Labeling can also be characterized as referencing.

Some language development experts have characterized child directed speech in stages. Primarily, the parents use repetition and also variation to maintain the infant's attention. Secondly, the parent simplifies speech to help in language learning. Third, any speech modifications maintain the responsiveness of the child. These modifications develop into a conversation that provides context for the development.

As these children begin to grow and acquire more language, it is the parenting style of the caretakers of the child that directly influences their language skills and reading comprehension. These parenting styles that affect these children are the authoritative and authoritarian. The styles that are more authoritative have a direct association with an increase in language development and reading comprehension, while the authoritarian style has a negative relationship to family cohesion which negatively impacts language development and reading comprehension. It is the style of parenting that is used that can determine how well our children can acquire language.

=== Cultural and socioeconomic effects ===
While most children throughout the world develop language at similar rates and without difficulty, cultural and socioeconomic differences have been shown to influence development. An example of cultural differences in language development can be seen when comparing the interactions of mothers in the United States with their infants with mothers in Japan. Mothers in the United States use more questions, are more information-oriented, and use more grammatically correct utterances with their 3-month-olds. Mothers in Japan, on the other hand, use more physical contact with their infants, and more emotion-oriented, nonsense, and environmental sounds, as well as baby talk, with their infants. These differences in interaction techniques reflect differences in "each society's assumptions about infants and adult-to-adult cultural styles of talking."

Specifically in North American culture, maternal race, education, and socioeconomic class influence parent-child interactions in the early linguistic environment. When speaking to their infants, mothers from middle class "incorporate language goals more frequently in their play with their infants," and in turn, their infants produce twice as many vocalizations as lower class infants. Mothers from higher social classes who are better educated also tend to be more verbal, and have more time to spend engaging with their infants in language. Additionally, lower class infants may receive more language input from their siblings and peers than from their mothers.

== Social preconditions ==
It is crucial that children are allowed to socially interact with other people who can vocalize and respond to questions. For language acquisition to develop successfully, children must be in an environment that allows them to communicate socially in that language. Children who have learnt sound, meaning and grammatical system of language that can produce clear sentence may still not have the ability to use language effectively in various social circumstance. Social interaction is the footing stone of language.

There are a few different theories as to why and how children develop language. One popular, yet heavily debated explanation is that language is acquired through imitation. This theory has been challenged by Lester Butler, who argues that children do not use the grammar that an adult would use. Furthermore, "children's language is highly resistant to alteration by adult intervention", meaning that children do not use the corrections given to them by an adult. R.L Trask also argues in his book Language: The Basics that deaf children acquire, develop and learn sign language in the same way hearing children do, so if a deaf child's parents are fluent sign speakers, and communicate with the baby through sign language, the baby will learn fluent sign language. And if a child's parents aren't fluent, the child will still learn to speak fluent sign language. Trask's theory therefore is that children learn language by acquiring and experimenting with grammatical patterns, the statistical language acquisition theory.

The two most accepted theories in language development are psychological and functional.

Psychological explanations focus on the mental processes involved in childhood language learning. Functional explanations look at the social processes involved in learning the first language.

== Aspects ==
- Phonology involves the rules about the structure and sequence of speech sounds.
- Semantics consists of vocabulary and how concepts are expressed through words.
- Grammar involves two parts.
  - The first, syntax, is the rules in which words are arranged into sentences.
  - The second, morphology, is the use of grammatical markers (indicating tense, active or passive voice etc.).
- Pragmatics involves the rules for appropriate and effective communication. Pragmatics involves three skills:
  - using language for greeting, demanding etc.,
  - changing language for talking differently depending on who it is you are talking to;
  - following rules such as turn taking, staying on topic.

Each component has its own appropriate developmental periods.

=== Phonological development ===
Babies can recognize their mother's voice from as early as few weeks old. It seems like they have a unique system that is designed to recognize speech sound. Furthermore, they can differentiate between certain speech sounds. A significant first milestone in phonetic development is the babbling stage (around the age of six months). This is the baby's way of practicing his control over that apparatus. Babbling is independent from the language. Deaf children for instance, babble the same way as hearing ones. As the baby grows older, the babbling increases in frequency and starts to sound more like words (around the age of twelve months). Although every child is an individual with different pace of mastering speech, there is a tendency to an order of which speech sounds are mastered:

- Vowels before consonants
- Stop sounds before any other consonant sounds (for example: 'p','t','b')
- Place of articulation – labials, alveolar, velars, alveopalatals, and interdentals in that order by the age of 4. That means that there is some order to the development of the physical system in young children.

==== Early phonetic processes ====
As the children's ability to produce sound develops, their ability to perceive the phonetic contrast of their language develops. The better they get in mastering the sound, the more sensitive they become to the changes in those sounds in their language once they get exposed to it. They learn to isolate individual phonemes while speaking which also serves as the basis of reading.

Some processes that occur in early age:

- Syllable deletion – stressed syllables are emphasis that may be given to certain syllables in a word. They are more likely to be retained in children's pronunciation than unstressed syllables (less emphasis on the sound) because they are more salient to children in an early language acquisition process. So children may say helikat instead of helicopter or fowe instead of telephone. That way, they don't pronounce the more emphasized sound in the word.
- Syllable simplification – another process that happens in order to simplify syllable structure, children delete certain sounds systematically. For example, children might say 'tap' instead of "stop" and completely drop the 's' sound in that word. That is a common process in children's speech development.
- Substitution – systematic replacement of one sound by an alternative, easier one to articulate (substitution process – stopping, fronting, gliding). It means that the young toddler may use sounds that are easier to produce instead of the proper sound in a word. We may see that the child replace the 'r' sound with 'l' or 'w', the 'n' with 'd' and so on.
- Assimilation – modification of segments of the word influenced by neighboring sounds, due to ease of articulation. In order for the young speaker to produce sounds easier, he or she may replace the sound in a specific word to a different one, which is somewhat similar. For example, the word "pig" may sound as "big" – 'p' and 'b' are close in their sound. (Lightbown, Spada, Ranta & Rand, 2006).

From shortly after birth to around one year, the baby starts to make speech sounds. At around two months, the baby engages in cooing, which mostly consists of vowel sounds. At around four to six months, cooing turns into babbling, which is the repetitive consonant-vowel combinations. Babies understand more than they are able to say. In this 0–8 months range, the child is engaged in vocal play of vegetative sounds, laughing, and cooing.

Once the child hits the 8–12-month, range the child engages in canonical babbling, i.e. dada as well as variegated babbling. This jargon babbling with intonational contours the language being learned.

From 12–24 months, babies can recognize the correct pronunciation of familiar words. Babies also use phonological strategies to simplify word pronunciation. Some strategies include repeating the first consonant-vowel in a multisyllable word ('TV' → 'didi') or deleting unstressed syllables in a multisyllable word ('banana' → 'nana'). Within this first year, two-word utterances and two syllable words emerge. This period is often called the holophrastic stage of development, because one word conveys as much meaning as an entire phrase. For instance, the simple word "milk" can imply that the child is requesting milk, noting spilled milk, sees a cat drinking milk, etc. One study found that children at this age were capable of comprehending 2-word sentences, producing 2–3-word sentences, and naming basic colors.

By 24–30 months awareness of rhyme emerges as well as rising intonation. One study concludes that children between the ages of 24 and 30 months typically can produce 3–4-word sentence, create a story when prompted by pictures, and at least 50% of their speech is intelligible.

By 36–60 months, phonological awareness continues to improve as well as pronunciation. At this age, children have a considerable experience with language and are able to form simple sentences that are 3 words in length. They use basic prepositions, pronouns, and plurals. They become immensely creative in their language use and learn to categorize items such as recognizing that a shoe is not a fruit. At this age, children also learn to ask questions and negate sentences to develop these questions. Over time, their syntax gets more and more unique and complex. A study reveals that at this age, a child's speech should be at least 75% intelligible.

By 6–10 years, children can master syllable stress patterns, which helps distinguish slight differences between similar words.

=== Semantic development ===
The average child masters about fifty words by the age of eighteen months. These might include words such as, milk, water, juice and apple (noun-like words). Afterwards they acquire 12 to 16 words a day. By the age of six, they master about 13 to 14 thousand words.

The most frequent words include adjective-like expressions for displeasure and rejection such as 'no'. They also include social interaction words, such as "please" and "bye".

There are three stages for learning the meaning of new words:

1. Whole object assumption:
  A new word refers to a whole object. For example, when an eighteen-months old child sees a sheep and his mother points at it and says the word 'sheep', the child infers that the word 'sheep' describes the whole animal and not parts of it (such as color, shape, etc.).
2. Type assumption:
  A new word refers to a type of thing, not just to a particular thing. For example, when the child hears the word 'sheep' he infers that it is used for the animal type and not only for that particular sheep that he saw.
3. Basic level assumption:
  A new word refers to objects that are alike in basic ways (appearance, behavior, etc.).

In other words, when the child hears the word "sheep" he overgeneralizes it to other animals that look like sheep by the external appearance, such as white, wooly and four-legged animal.

Contextual clues are a major factor in the child's vocabulary development.

The child uses contextual clues to draw inferences about the category and meaning of new words. By doing so, the child distinguishes between names and ordinary nouns.

For example, when an object is presented to the child with the determiner "a" (a cat, a dog, a bottle) he perceives it as an ordinary noun.

However, when the child hears a noun without the determiner, he perceives it as a name, for instance "this is Mary".

Children usually make correct meaning associations with the words that the adults say. However, sometimes they make semantic errors.

There are a few types of semantic errors:

Overextension: When a child says or hears a word, they might associate what they see or hear as more generalized concept than the real meaning of the word. For example, if they say "cat", they might overextend it to other animals with same features.

Underextension: It involves the use of lexical items in an overly restrictive fashion. In other words, the child focuses on core members of a certain category. For example: 'cat' may only refer to the family cat and no other cat, or 'dog' may refer to certain kinds of dogs that the child is exposed to.

Verb meaning: when a pre-school child hears the verb 'fill', he understands it as the action 'pour' rather than the result, which is 'make full'.

Dimensional terms: the first dimensional adjectives acquired are big and small because they belong to the size category. The size category is the most general one. Later children acquire the single dimension adjectives, such as, tall-short, long-short, high-low. Eventually they acquire the adjectives that describe the secondary dimension, such as thick-thin, wide-narrow and deep-shallow.

From birth to one year, comprehension (the language we understand) develops before production (the language we use). There is about a 5-month lag in between the two. Babies have an innate preference to listen to their mother's voice. Babies can recognize familiar words and use preverbal gestures.

Within the first 12–18 months semantic roles are expressed in one word speech including agent, object, location, possession, nonexistence and denial. Words are understood outside of routine games but the child still needs contextual support for lexical comprehension.

18–24 months Prevalent relations are expressed such as agent-action, agent-object, action-location. Also, there is a vocabulary spurt between 18 and 24 months, which includes fast mapping. Fast mapping is the babies' ability to learn a lot of new things quickly. The majority of the babies' new vocabulary consists of object words (nouns) and action words (verbs).

30–36 months The child is able to use and understand why question and basic spatial terms such as in, on or under.

36–42 months There is an understanding of basic color words and kinship terms. Also, the child has an understanding of the semantic relationship between adjacent and conjoined sentences, including casual and contrastive.

42–48 months When and how questions are comprehended as well as basic shape words such as circle, square and triangle.

48–60 months Knowledge of letter names and sounds emerges, as well as numbers.

By 3–5 years, children usually have difficulty using words correctly. Children experience many problems such as underextensions, taking a general word and applying it specifically (for example, 'cartoons' specifically for 'Mickey Mouse') and overextensions, taking a specific word and applying it too generally (example, 'ant' for any insect). However, children coin words to fill in for words not yet learned (for example, someone is a cooker rather than a chef because a child may not know what a chef is). Children can also understand metaphors.

From 6–10 years, children can understand meanings of words based on their definitions. They also are able to appreciate the multiple meanings of words and use words precisely through metaphors and puns. Fast mapping continues. Within these years, children are now able to acquire new information from written texts and can explain relationships between multiple meaning words. Common idioms are also understood.

=== Syntactic development ===
The development of syntactic structures follows a particular pattern and reveals much on the nature of language acquisition, which has several stages. According to O'Grady and Cho (2011), the first stage, occurring between the ages of 12 and 18 months, is called "one-word stage." In this stage, children cannot form syntactic sentences and therefore use one-word utterances called "holophrases" that express an entire sentence. In addition, children's comprehension is more advanced than their production abilities. For example, a child who wants candy may say "candy" instead of expressing a full sentence.

The following stage is the "two-word stage" in which children begin to produce "mini-sentences" that are composed of two words, such as "doggy bark" and "Ken water" (O'Grady & Cho, 2011, p. 346). At this stage, it is unclear whether children have an understanding of underlying rules of the language such as syntactic categories, since their "mini-sentences" often lack distinction between the categories. However, children do exhibit sensitivity to sentence structures and they frequently use appropriate word order.

After several months of speech that is restricted to short utterances, children enter the "telegraphic stage" and begin to produce longer and more complex grammatical structures (O'Grady & Cho, 2011, p. 347). This stage is characterized by production of complex structures as children begin to form phrases consisting of a subject and a complement in addition to use of modifiers and composition of full sentences. Children use mostly content words and their sentences lack function words. For example, a child may say "fill cup water," instead of saying, "Fill my cup with water." Subsequently, language acquisition continues to develop rapidly and children begin to acquire complex grammar that shows understanding of intricate linguistic features, such as the ability to switch the position of words in sentences.

Throughout the process of syntactic development, children acquire and develop question structures. According to O'Grady and Cho (2011), at the early stages of language acquisition, children ask yes–no questions by rising intonation alone as they develop awareness to auxiliary verbs only at a later stage. When auxiliary verbs make their appearance, it takes children a few months before they are able to use inversion in yes–no questions. The development of WH- questions occurs between the ages of two and four, when children acquire auxiliary verbs that then leads to the ability to use inversion in questions. However, some children find inversion easier in yes–no questions than in WH- questions, since the position of both the WH- word and the auxiliary verb must change (e.g., "You are going where?" instead of "Where are you going?").

=== Morphological development ===
Morphological structures development occurs over a period of several years. Before language is acquired, children lack any use of morphological structures.

The morphological structures that children acquire during their childhood, and even up to the early school years, are: determiners (a, the), -ing inflection, plural –s, auxiliary be, possessive –s, third person singular –s, past tense –ed). When children start using these structures, they tend to overgeneralize the rules and project them upon all the words in the language, including irregulars. For example, if a child knows the –ed (past tense) there is a possibility that they will say "I eated" (man-mans cat-cats). These errors result from overgeneralization of rules. This overgeneralization is very noticeable: in fact, children do that in less than 25 percent of the time at any point before reducing that percentage. Then they improve their mastery, which can be tested in various ways, such as the "wug test" (Berko, 1958).

Children often figure out quickly frequent irregular verbs, such as go and buy rather than less common ones, such as win. This suggests that children must hear the word several hundred times before they are able to use it correctly.

This development of bound morphemes is similar in order among children, for example: -ing is acquired before the article the. However, parents tend to use a different order while speaking to their kids, for example, parents use the article 'the' more frequently than -ing. Meaning, other factors determine the order of acquisition, such as:

1. Morphemes that come at the end of an utterance are remembered better.
2. Children seem to remember morphemes such as –ing better because they contain their own syllables rather than single consonant morpheme, such as plural –s.
3. Affixes with more than one meaning are more difficult to acquire, e.g., –s functions both as plural noun and singular third.

As it comes to word formation processes such as derivation and compounding, the earliest derivational suffixes to show up in children's speech are those they hear adults use most frequently. (-er as the *'doer' of the action such as walker.) When it comes to compounds, children first make up names for agents and instruments that they don't know by a pattern (N-N), though some of them do not follow the pattern (*cutter grass for grass cutter). Then, they might have the right structure but the words are inappropriate since English already has words with the intended meaning such as car-smoke = exhaust. This process points to a preference for building words from other words, thus place less demand on memory than learning an entirely new word for each concept.

=== Grammatical development ===
Grammar describes the way sentences of a language are constructed, which includes both syntax and morphology.

==== Syntactic development and morphological development ====
Syntactic development involves the ways that various morphemes are ordered or combined in sentences. Morphemes, which are basic units of meaning in language, get added as children learn to produce simple sentences and become more precise speakers. Morphemes can be whole words (like "happy") or parts of words that change meaning of words ("un"happy). Brown proposed a stage model that describes the various types of morphological structures that are developed in English and the age range within which they are normally acquired.

Stage I: From 15–30 months, children start using telegraphic speech, which are two-word combinations, for example 'wet diaper'. Brown (1973) observed that 75% of children's two-word utterances could be summarized in the existence of 11 semantic relations:

- Attributive: 'Big house'
- Agent-action: 'Daddy hit'
- Action-object: 'Hit ball'
- Agent-object: 'Daddy ball'
- Nominative: 'That ball'
- Demonstrative: 'There ball'
- Recurrence: 'More ball'
- Non-existence: 'All-gone ball'
- Possessive: 'Daddy chair'
- Entity + Locative: 'book table'
- Action + Locative: 'go store'

Stage II: At around 28–36 months, children begin to engage in the production of simple sentences, usually 3 word sentences. These simple sentences follow syntactic rules and are refined gradually as development continues. The morphological developments seen in this age range include use of present progressive (-ing endings), the prepositions "in" and "on", and regular plurals (-s endings).

Stage III: Around 36–42 months, children continue to add morphemes and gradually produce complex grammatical structures. The morphemes that are added at this age include irregular past tense, possessive ('s), and use of the verb 'to be' (It is, I am, etc.).

Stage IV:Around 40–46 months children continue to add to their morphological knowledge. This range is associated with use of articles (a or the), regular past tense (-ed endings), and regular third person speech (He likes it).

Stage V: Around 42-52+ months children refine the complex grammatical structures and increase their use of morphemes to convey more complex ideas. Children in this stage use irregular third-person speech, the verb 'to be' as an auxiliary verb (She was not laughing), and in its contraction forms (It's, She's, etc.).

=== Pragmatic development ===
From birth to one year, babies can engage in joint attention (sharing the attention of something with someone else). Infants also can engage in turn taking activities on the basis of their sensitivity to social contingency, which can elicit social responses in the babies from very early on. For example, most acquire early sensitivity to the prosodic patterns of social rituals such as peek-a-boo.

- By age 0.5–1 years, infants understand that speech sounds can express intentions (such as requests) as opposed to coughs. They also recognize that variability of exchanged signal sequences and turn-taking are prerequisites of communicative information transfer.
- By age 1–2 years, they can engage in turn-taking exchanges and understand that turn-taking interactions of observed others can convey goal-relevant, communicative information.
- By age 3–5 years, children can master illocutionary intent, knowing what you meant to say even though you might not have said it and turnabout, which is turning the conversation over to another person.
- By age 6–10 years, shading occurs, which is changing the conversation topic gradually. Children are able to communicate effectively in demanding settings, such as on the telephone.

=== Effect of bilingualism ===
There is a large debate regarding whether or not bilingualism is truly beneficial to children. Parents of children often view learning a second language throughout elementary and high school education beneficial to the child. Another perspective dictates that the second language just confuses the child and prevents them from mastering their primary language. Studies have shown that American bilingual children have greater cognitive flexibility, better perceptual skills and tend to be more divergent thinkers than monolingual children between the ages of five and ten. Better executive functioning skills are likely because bilingual children have to choose one language to speak while actively suppressing the other. This builds stronger selective attention and cognitive flexibility because these skills are being exercised more. In addition, bilingual children have a better understanding of universal language concepts, such as grammar, because these concepts are applied in multiple languages. However, studies comparing Swedish-Finnish bilingual children and Swedish monolingual children between the ages of five and seven have also shown that the bilingual children have a smaller vocabulary than monolingual children. In another study throughout America, elementary school English-monolingual children performed better in mathematics and reading activities than their non-English-dominant bilingual and non-English monolingual peers from kindergarten to grade five. Learning two languages simultaneously can be beneficial or a hindrance to a child's language and intellectual development. Further research is necessary to continue to shed light on this debate.

In addition to the study of bilingualism in children, similar research is being conducted in adults. Research findings show that although bilingual benefits are muted in middle adulthood, they are more profound in older age when those who develop dementia experience onset about 4.5 years later in bilingual subjects. The increased attentional control, inhibition, and conflict resolution developed from bilingualism may be accountable for the later onset of dementia.

==== Misdiagnoses as a language impairment ====
There is some research that demonstrates that bilingualism may often be misdiagnosed as a language impairment. A subtopic of bilingualism in the literature is nonstandard varieties of English. While bilingualism and nonstandard varieties of English cannot be considered a true language impairment, they are misrepresented in the population of those receiving language interventions.

== Language disorders ==
A language disorder is the impaired comprehension and or use of a spoken, written, or other symbol system. A disorder may involve problems in the following areas:

1. The form of language i.e. phonology, morphology, or syntax
2. The content i.e. semantics
3. The function of language in communication i.e. pragmatics

Olswang and colleagues have identified a series of behaviors in children in the 18–36-month range that are predictors for the need of language intervention.

These predictors include:

- A smaller than average vocabulary
- A language comprehension delay of 6 months or a comprehension deficit with a large comprehension production gap
- Phonological problems such as restricted babbling or limited vocalizations
- Few spontaneous vocal imitations and reliance on direct modeling in imitation tasks
- Little combinatorial or symbolic play
- Few communicative or symbolic gestures
- Behavior problems

Some of the many conditions that cause language development problems include:

- Attention deficit hyperactivity disorder
- Auditory processing disorder
- Autism
- Developmental verbal dyspraxia
- Language delay
- Otitis media
- Pragmatic language impairment
- Specific language impairment
- Speech delay
- Speech disorder
- Speech sound disorder
- Speech repetition

== See also ==
- Computational models of language acquisition
- Errors in early word use
- Essay on the Origin of Languages
- Evolutionary linguistics
- Genie (feral child)
- Infantile speech
- KE family
- Language acquisition
- Language acquisition device
- List of children's speech corpora
- Mean length of utterance
- Metalinguistic awareness
- Origin of language
- Phonological development
- Pragmatic mapping
- Proto-Human language
- Speech
- Victor of Aveyron
