= Margaret M. Bryant =

American linguist (1900–1993)

- Bryant, from a 1956 newspaper
- Born: December 3, 1900; Trenton, South Carolina, U.S.
- Died: July 15, 1993 (age 92); Clemson, South Carolina, U.S.
- Occupations: Linguist, English professor, folklorist

Margaret Mae Bryant (December 3, 1900 – July 15, 1993) was an American linguist and folklorist. She was an expert on grammar, and was twice president of the American Name Society.

== Early life and education ==
Bryant was born in Trenton, South Carolina, the daughter of John Bryant and Hattie Bryant. She graduated from Winthrop College in 1921, and earned a master's degree (1925) and a Ph.D. (1931), both at Columbia University. She was a member of Phi Beta Kappa.

== Career ==
Bryant was a professor of English at Brooklyn College for 41 years, from 1930 until she retired in 1971, and chair of the English department. She was a charter member and president of the American Name Society, president of the International Linguistic Association, and president of the American Society of Geolinguistics. She was also president of the New York City chapter of the American Association of University Women (AAUW). In 1956, received the Mary Mildred Sullivan Medallion from Winthrop College, as an outstanding alumna. She was a cultural attaché in India, and a visiting scholar at the University of Uppsala, and attended the International Congress of Onomastic Sciences. In 1963, she endowed a fellowship for an international student at Winthrop College. In 1974, the American Name Society published a festschrift in her honor.

== Publications ==
In addition to several books, Bryant's research was published in journals including College English, American Speech, English Journal, Western Folklore, The Bulletin of the National Association of Secondary School Principals, and Names.

=== Books ===
- Psychology of English (1940, with Janet Rankin Aiken)
- Proverbs, and how to Collect Them (1945)
- Maple Sugar Language in Vermont (1947)
- Modern English and Its Heritage (1948)
- A Functional English Grammar (1959)
- Current American Usage (1962)
- A Dictionary of American Proverbs (1992)

=== Articles ===
- "English in the Law Courts: The Part That Articles, Prepositions and Conjunctions Play in Legal Decisions" (1930)
- "What One Word Can Do" (1941)
- "Equivalents of 'Please': The Softened Imperative in Present-Day English" (1944)
- "Order in Sentences" (1944)
- "The Psychology of English" (1947)
- "Proverbial Lore in American Life and Speech" (1951)
- "Research in the English Language" (1955)
- "Names in Everyday Speach" (1957)
- "Baby Terms" (1963, with John D. Williams)
- "Names in Gardening" (1964)
- "Space Exploration Terms" (1968)
- "Names and Terms Used in the Fashion World" (1970)
- "Some Indian and Dutch Names Reflecting the Early History of Brooklyn" (1972)
- "Blends are Increasing" (1974)
- "After 25 Years of Onomastic Study" (1976)
- "New Words from Popular Mechanics" (1977)
- "Marcel Proust's Interest in Names" (1978)

== Personal life and legacy ==
Bryant moved into a South Carolina nursing home in her last years, and was elected president of the residents there. She died in 1993, at the age of 92, in Clemson, South Carolina. In 1997, her alma mater Winthrop University established a Margaret M. Bryant Professorship in English.
