= Ecolinguistics =

Area of linguistic research

Ecolinguistics emerged in the 1990s as a new paradigm of linguistic research that widens sociolinguistics to take into account not only the social context in which language is embedded but also the wider ecological context, including other species and the physical environment.

Michael Halliday's 1990 speech New ways of Meaning: the challenge to Applied Linguistics is often credited as a work that provided the stimulus for linguists to consider the ecological context and consequences of language. Among other things, the challenge that Halliday put forward was to make linguistics relevant to overarching contemporary issues, particularly the widespread destruction of ecosystems. The main example that Halliday gives is that of "economic growth" by describing how "countless texts repeated daily all around the world contain a simple message: growth is good. Many is better than few, more is better than less, big is better than small, grow is better than shrink," which leads to environmentally destructive consequences.

== Overview ==
Since Michael Halliday's initial comments, ecolinguistics has developed in several directions, employing a range of linguistic tools to investigate language in an ecological context. The International Ecolinguistics Association characterizes ecolinguistics in these terms:

"Ecolinguistics explores the role of language in the life-sustaining interactions of humans, other species and the physical environment. The first aim is to develop linguistic theories which see humans not only as part of society, but also as part of the larger ecosystems that life depends on. The second aim is to show how linguistics can be used to address key ecological issues, from climate change and biodiversity loss to environmental justice."

In this way, the 'eco' of ecolinguistics corresponds to ecology in its literal sense of the relationship of organisms (including humans) with other organisms and the physical environment. This is a sense shared with other environmental humanities disciplines such as ecocriticism and ecopsychology.

The term 'ecolinguistics' has also been used in the past with a metaphorical sense of 'ecology', for example in 'linguistic ecology', 'communication ecology' or 'learning ecology' in ways which do not include consideration of other species or the physical environment. Areas such as this are not considered to be part of contemporary ecolinguistics.

Another aspect of ecolinguistics is linguistic diversity and the embedding of traditional environmental knowledge in local languages. In 1996, David Abram's book The Spell of the Sensuous: Perception and Language in a More-than-Human World described how the wider environment (or 'the more than human world') shapes language in oral cultures and helps people attune to their environment and live sustainably within it. According to Abram, writing has gradually alienated people in literate cultures from the natural world, to the extent that "our organic attunement to the local earth is thwarted by our ever-increasing intercourse with our own signs". As dominant languages such as English spread across the world, environmental knowledge that is embedded in local cultures is lost.

There are two main areas of interest for ecolinguistics. One can be described as 'The ecological analysis of language' and the other as 'Linguistic and biological diversity'.

== Ecological analysis of language ==
The ecological analysis of language draws on a wide range of linguistic tools including critical discourse analysis, framing theory, cognitive linguistics, identity theory, rhetoric and systemic functional grammar to reveal underlying worldviews or the 'stories we live by'. The stories we live by are cognitive structures in the minds of individuals or across a society (social cognition), which influence people's ecocultural identities and how humans treat each other, other animals, plants, forests, rivers and the physical environment.

The stories are questioned from an ecological perspective with reference to an ecological framework (or ecosophy), and judged to encourage people to protect the ecosystems that life depends on, or encourage behavior which damages those ecosystems. Ecolinguistics attempts to make a practical difference in the world through resisting destructive stories and contributing to the search for beneficial new stories to live by. Stories that ecolinguists claim are destructive relate to consumerism, unlimited economic growth, advertising, intensive farming, and those which represent nature as a machine or a resource. Using "positive discourse analysis", ecolinguistics has also searches for new stories to live by through exploring nature writing, poetry, environmental writing and traditional forms of language around the world.

This form of analysis started with the application of critical discourse analysis to texts about environmentalism, in order to reveal hidden assumptions and messages and comment on the effectiveness of these in achieving environmental aims (e.g. Harré et al. 1999). It then developed to include analysis of any discourse which has potential consequences for the future of ecosystems, such as neoliberal economics, consumerism, lifestyle magazines, politics, or agribusiness. The cognitive approach and the term 'stories we live by' were introduced by Arran Stibbe in 2015, with eight kinds of story: ideology, framing, metaphor, evaluation, identity, conviction, salience and erasure.

The approach was updated in the second edition of Ecolinguistics: language, ecology and the stories we live by in 2021. In 2024, the approach was extended to include consideration of narrative, as one of the most powerful forms of environmental persuasion, in Arran Stibbe's book Econarrative: ethics, ecology and the search for new narratives to live by.

== Linguistic and biological diversity ==
Language diversity is part of ecolinguistics because of the relationship between diversity of local languages and biodiversity. The relationship arises because of the cultural adaptation to the environment that is encoded in local languages. The forces of globalisation allow dominant languages (such as English) to spread, and they replace local languages (Nettle and Romaine 2000), which leads to a loss of both sustainable local cultures and the important traditional ecological knowledge contained within their languages. Ecolinguistic research aims to protect both cultural diversity and the linguistic diversity that supports it. The United Nations Environment Program describes how:

"Biodiversity also incorporates human cultural diversity, which can be affected by the same drivers as biodiversity, and which has impacts on the diversity of genes, other species, and ecosystems".

Nettle and Romaine (2000:166) write that "delicate tropical environments in particular must be managed with care and skill. It is indigenous peoples who have the relevant practical knowledge, since they have been successfully making a living in them for hundreds of generations. Much of this detailed knowledge about local ecosystems is encoded in indigenous language and rapidly being lost". Mühlhaüsler states "the rapid decline in the world's linguistic diversity thus must be regarded with apprehension by those who perceive the interconnection between linguistic and biological diversity".

Overall, language diversity is part of ecolinguistics because of the correlation between the diversity of language and biological diversity, with the knowledge of nature embedded in local cultures being the link between the two.

== Websites ==
The International Ecolinguistics Association is an international network of ecolinguists. The website includes a bibliography, online journal (Language & Ecology) and other resources.

The Stories We Live By is a free online course in ecolinguistics created by the University of Gloucestershire and the International Ecolinguistics Association.

== See also ==
- Biosemiotics
- Ecocriticism
- Ecopsychology
- Ecosemiotics
- Environmental communication
- Environmental humanities
- Yukio Tsuda
- Language policy
- Linguistic ecology
- Linguistic rights
