= Mean length of utterance =

Measure of linguistic productivity in children

Mean length of utterance (or MLU) is a measure of linguistic productivity in children. It is traditionally calculated by collecting 100 utterances spoken by a child and dividing the number of morphemes by the number of utterances. A higher MLU is taken to indicate a higher level of language proficiency. The mean length of utterance (MLU) was proposed by Roger Brown (1973) as a better index for language development in children than age.

Mean length of utterance is a good marker of language impairment. It is the number of words or morphemes in each of their spontaneous utterances. It can be used to benchmark language acquisition and is used to compare language intervention outcomes in children with autism. In testing of children ages 3–9 with diagnoses of autism or autism spectrum disorders and nonverbal IQ scores below 85, results indicated that children with autism persistently scored below the unaffected group without significant improvement in scores concerning mean length of utterance. There may be variability in outcomes due to sampling differences.

A study by Bishop and Adams (1990) suggests that MLU at 4.5 is a good predictor of reading ability at age 8. Nonetheless, MLU is considered controversial, and should not be used as the only diagnostic measure of language proficiency in children.

== See also ==
- Language acquisition
- Language development
