= Geolinguistics =

Branch of language geography

Geolinguistics is a branch of linguistics and of language geography, a branch of human geography. As a branch of linguistics, it includes dialectology and linguistic areal features.

One academic tradition sees dialect geography, language geography, and linguistic geography as geolinguistics. This identification of geolinguistics with linguistic map-making appears across a range of languages, including Chinese, French, Japanese, Russian and Spanish. In German, in addition to an identification of geolinguistics with the terms Sprachgeographie (language geography) and Dialektgeographie (dialect geography), the term Areallinguistik (areal linguistics) appears as also being synonymous.

A second linguistic tradition is that of The American Society of Geolinguistics which interprets geolinguistics to be "An academic discipline involving the analysis and implications of the geographical location, distribution and structure of language varieties within a temporal framework, either in isolation or in contact and/or conflict with one another, being originally conceived of by Mario Pei as being a branch of linguistics which would be used to do objective-oriented research on real life language issues and where interdisciplinary approaches would be acceptable." The Society's mission statement mentions the gathering and disseminating of "up-to-date knowledge concerning the world`s present-day languages, dialects, and other language varieties in the context of their distribution and use, their relative practical importance, their perceived usefulness and actual availability from economic, political and cultural standpoints, their genetic, historical and geographical affiliations and relationships, and their identification and use in spoken and written form". It also states the Society's interest in "linguistic geography, languages in contact and conflict, language planning and policy, language education and the broader aspects of sociolinguistics".

Two important geolinguistic organizations exist whose naming and/or translation practices imply a certain recognition of the traditional importance that dialectologists have attached to the role of language map-making as a tool for linguistic analysis. They are the Asian Geolinguistic Society of Japan and, in Europe, The International Society for Dialectology and Geolinguistics.

== See also ==
- Ecolinguistics
- Sprachbund
