= Errors in early word use =

Mistakes that children commonly commit when first learning language

Errors in early word use or developmental errors are mistakes that children commonly commit when first learning language. Language acquisition is an impressive cognitive achievement attained by humans. In the first few years of life, children already demonstrate general knowledge and understanding of basic patterns in their language. They can extend words they hear to novel situations and apply grammatical rules in novel contexts. Although children possess an impressive ability to acquire and comprehend language early in life, they make many errors and mistakes as they enhance their knowledge and understanding of language. Three prominent errors in early word use are overgeneralization, overextension, and underextension.

The majority of words that children first learn are often used correctly. However, estimates indicate that up to one-third of the first fifty words that children learn are occasionally misused. Many studies indicate a curvilinear trend in naming errors and mistakes in initial word usage. In other words, early in language acquisition, children rarely make naming errors. However, as vocabulary enhances and language growth accelerates, the frequency of error increases. The amount of error decreases again as vocabulary continues to improve.

Scholars debate the underlying developmental causes and reasons for these mistakes. One theory, the semantic feature hypothesis, states that mistakes occur because children acquire the basic features of a word's meaning before learning its more specific aspects. For instance, the child may initially use the word basketball in reference to any round object, but then change its meaning to a round, orange, and grooved ball that bounces. Children may overextend the meaning of basketball to any round object until they learn the more specific aspects of the word's meaning. Other theories suggest that errors in early word use are the result of an inability on the part of the child to retrieve the correct word. Although the child might have accurately comprehended the word at one time, they are unable to actively retrieve the word or its meaning from their rapidly growing vocabulary.

== Overregularization (overgeneralization) ==
Overregularization is defined as the "application of a principle of regular change to a word that changes irregularly." Examples of overregularization in verb use include using the word comed instead of came. Examples in noun use include using the word tooths instead of teeth. The error is usually seen after children have learned language rules because children apply learned rules to irregular words. Pertaining to the examples, the child using the word comed may have originally used came correctly. Once the child learned the '-ed' suffix rule that commonly forms the past tense; however, the child applied the rule to a verb whose correct grammatical form is irregular. The same applies to the tooths example, but the language rule is the addition of the suffix '-s' to form the plural noun. Overregularization research led by Daniel Slobin argues against B.F. Skinner's view of language development through reinforcement. It shows that children actively construct words' meanings and forms during the child's own development.

Differing views on the causes of overregularization and its extinction have been presented. Gary Marcus et al. published a study in which they monitored the speech of 83 children and recorded the spoken past tense of irregular verbs. They argue that children store irregular verbs in their memory and separately develop a rule for the production of the past tense form of any verb. To correctly use an irregular verb, children must retrieve that verb from their memory and block the rule; however, children's retrieval is often imperfect. They conclude the cause of overregularization with: "When retrieval fails, the rule is applied, and overregularization results." Their study's results found overregularization to be rare with a mean of 2.5% of the spoken irregular verbs, to be used for most irregular verbs from the ages of 2 years old until school ages, to be used less often with the irregular verbs that the child's parents speak more often, and to follow a pattern of "U-Shaped Development" in which the child uses the correct form of the irregular verb before overregularizing it. According to Marcus, overregularization ends when the child develops sufficiently strong memory traces to irregular forms.

Michael Maratsos disagrees with Marcus's causal claim. He argues that the overregularized verb form and the correct irregular form compete for usage, as "the two forms are both initially acceptable alternatives." The child increasingly chooses the irregular form, beating the overregularized one, because the child only experiences the irregular form. Maratsos argues that because children often use both the irregular and overregularized forms of the same verb, even in the same speech sample, the blocking theory proposed by Marcus proves problematic. If retrieval blocks the rule, it is unlikely that the rule would be 'un-blocked' soon after. He argues it seems more likely that environmental input and learning accounts for the gradual decline in overregularization. Moreover, the competition theory accounts for the highly varied rates of overregularization seen in Roger Brown's longitudinal study of Adam, Abe, and Sarah. Abe had an extremely high rate of overregularization, 24%, compared with Adam's rate of 3.6%, and Sarah's of 7.9%. Maratsos claims Abe was intellectually gifted, "likely the best overall learner and retriever of words." If Abe retrieved words well, then having such a high rate of overregularization is incompatible with Marcus's theory, which holds retrieval failure responsible for overregularization. Rather, Abe's bigger vocabulary exposed him to more regular words, resulting in a stronger competition between the irregular and overregularized forms and a higher potential rate of failure.

== Overextension ==
Overextension is an error in early word use in which a child uses a single word to label multiple different things in a manner that is inconsistent with adult usage. There are three types of overextensions. Categorical overinclusions involve using one word within a category to label a closely related referent that falls in the same category. Examples are seen in references to people (e.g. daddy for all men), animals (e.g. dog for horses and other quadrupeds), vehicles (e.g. truck for bus), foods (e.g. apple for oranges), and numerous other categories. Analogical overextensions involve inferring a similarity between a word's standard referent and its labeled referent in the absence of any actual relationship. Inferred similarities are most often perceptual, such as when a child uses ball to refer to all round objects (e.g. the moon). Predicate statements involve an attempt to comment on the relationship between an immediate referent and an absent entity. This is evident when a child uses doll to refer to an empty crib where the doll usually is located.

Like overgeneralizations, overextensions are believed to stem from limitations in vocabulary, which are the result of weak knowledge and/or immature retrieval ability. Clark and Clark (1977) have put forth a two-stage account of how overextensions develop. In the first stage, a child focuses on a particular feature of an object and refers to that feature using a single new word. Gradually, the child realizes that the word has a more specific meaning but does not know the other words that are required to be more precise. In the second stage, the child overextends the word, using it as a form of shorthand when referring to things that are similar to the standard referent. For example, the child uses dog to refer to any animal with similar features, namely four legs.

After increasing until a certain point, overextensions diminish over time as the child receives corrective feedback. This feedback most often comes from parents and teachers, who help the child revise his or her word meaning boundaries. However, parents can also unintentionally prolong the use of overextensions. Parents often respond to overextensions with acceptance, and the use of joint labeling (e.g. referring to both wolves and dogs as puppies) reinforces overextended language.

== Underextension ==
Underextension, which is roughly the opposite of overextension, occurs when a child acquires a word for a particular thing and fails to extend it to other objects in the same category, using the word in a highly restricted and individualistic way. For example, a child may learn the word flower in connection with a rose but fail to extend its meaning to other types of flowers. Although research more commonly addresses the underextension of nouns, this error can also apply to verbs. For example, a child might underextend the verb sit and only use it with reference to the family dog's sitting but no one else's.

Underextension is generally thought to be less common, or perhaps just less noticeable, than overextension, but according to Margaret Harris, recent research shows an increasing number of reports of underextension. According to Harris, there are two different kinds of underextension. The first is "context bound", in which a child produces a word only in a limited and specific context. An example is when a child only uses the word duck when hitting a toy duck off the bathtub and chuff-chuff only when pushing a toy train.

The second type of early underextension involves restricting a word to a particular referent instead of a particular situation. This kind of underextension is not context-bound but contextually flexible, and suggests that children are using words in a genuinely referential way. Harris mentions examples of this type of underextension from her own research, such as the use of the word clock only to refer to wall clocks and light only to refer to ceiling lights with a shade.

As is the case with overextension, parents can contribute to a child's prolonged underextension of words. When speaking to their children, parents may not give every instance of a category of objects its correct name, especially in unusual situations, triggering word errors. In a study by Thomas G. White, preschool children ages 3 to 5 did not apply labels (e.g., food) to category instances that were rated as atypical by adults. The study also showed that mothers used superordinate terms much less in atypical instances than typical instances. This suggests that the labels children hear their parents apply may affect underextension. However, as children grow older, their vocabularies grow and instances of underextension decline.
