= Il talismano della felicità =

Italian cookbook written by Ada Boni

Il talismano della felicità (Italian: [il taliˈzmaːno della felitʃiˈta]; lit. 'The Talisman of Happiness'), written by magazine editor Ada Boni, is a well-known Italian cookbook originally published in 1927. The book is considered one of the defining recipe and cooking-advice collections in Italian cuisine, and quickly became a staple for generations of Italian women. The book has never been out of print in Italy, and sold more than a million copies. An abridged American edition was published in 1950, and a complete American edition was published in 2025.

== Background ==
Ada Boni was editor of a magazine Preziosa, and began including her recipes there in 1915 before publishing her collected recipes. Il talismano della felicità is believed to be the first Italian cookbook specifically targeted towards housewives, and along with the work of Pellegrino Artusi and Editoriale Domus' Il cucchiaio d'argento, it is considered one of the defining recipe and cooking-advice collections in Italian cuisine. It quickly became a staple for generations of Italian women. The standard edition is 1,054 pages long and was last reissued in 1999. There is also an abridged version known as Il piccolo talismano della felicità, published by the same editor. When it was first published in 1928, it contained approximately 882 recipes. Subsequent editions included over 2,000 recipes. It has been called the Italian Joy of Cooking. It has never been out of print in Italy, and has sold more than million copies.

== English edition ==
An abridged translation, by Matilde La Rosa, who added some "American-style" Italian recipes, with an introduction and glossary by Romance linguist Mario Pei, was published in 1950 as The Talisman Italian Cookbook: Italy's Bestselling Cookbook Adapted for American Kitchens (Crown/Random House, 1950). La Rosa and Pei decided to exclude recipes that were not of Italian origin for the American edition and also included a few Italian-American recipes that were considered necessary at the time in an Italian cookbook. A complete translation was released in 2025 by Voracious Publishing.

== See also ==
- Italian cuisine
- List of Italian foods and drinks
