= Pragmatic mapping =

Pragmatic mapping — a term in current use in linguistics, computing, cognitive psychology, and related fields — is the process by which a given abstract predicate (a symbol) comes to be associated through action (a dynamic index) with some particular logical object (an icon). The logical object may be a thing, person, relation, event, situation, or a string of these at any conceivable level of complexity. A relatively simple example is the conventional — successful, appropriate, and mundanely “true” — linking of a proper name to the person of whom it is a conventional designation.

There are three parts to this process when it succeeds. There is the abstract symbol which is used to represent something else (the name or the entire signifying predication, for instance); there is the something else that is represented by that symbol (whatever is signified); and there is the act of using the symbol in a conventional way to represent whatever it usually represents (the act of signifying). Pragmatic mapping is the process by which any material argument, or any imagined one, comes to be associated with a predicate that purports to be and succeeds in being about it. That is the predicate must be appropriate ("true" in the most mundane sense relative) to its logical object. The predication may be as simple as a naming act or as complex as a representation consisting of many distinct propositions with many associated clauses.

For instance, if we say "Jesse James was an American outlaw" the name "Jesse James" purports to be about a certain historical person whom we may know to have been shot by another individual named Robert Ford. We may know that a movie featuring Brad Pitt as Jesse James was released in September 2007 in select theaters across America. If the pragmatic mapping of the name "Jesse James" is complete, i.e., if it succeeds, it is mapped onto that certain individual that was actually shot by Robert Ford.

Nothing of importance changes in the pragmatic mapping process if it turns out that Jesse James and Robert Ford are figments of someone’s imagination, excepting, of course, the truth value of the propositions that include the logical object of the name, Jesse James. In ordinary conversation and human communication in general, it has been demonstrated logically and mathematically that meaning is utterly dependent on the true and appropriate pragmatic mapping of symbols to their conventional logical objects. Infants depend on exemplification of such mapping relations to acquire languages and all meaningful linguistic representations have been proved to depend on such mappings.

== See also ==
- Wörter und Sachen
