= Ada Boni =

Italian chef, magazine editor, food writer and author

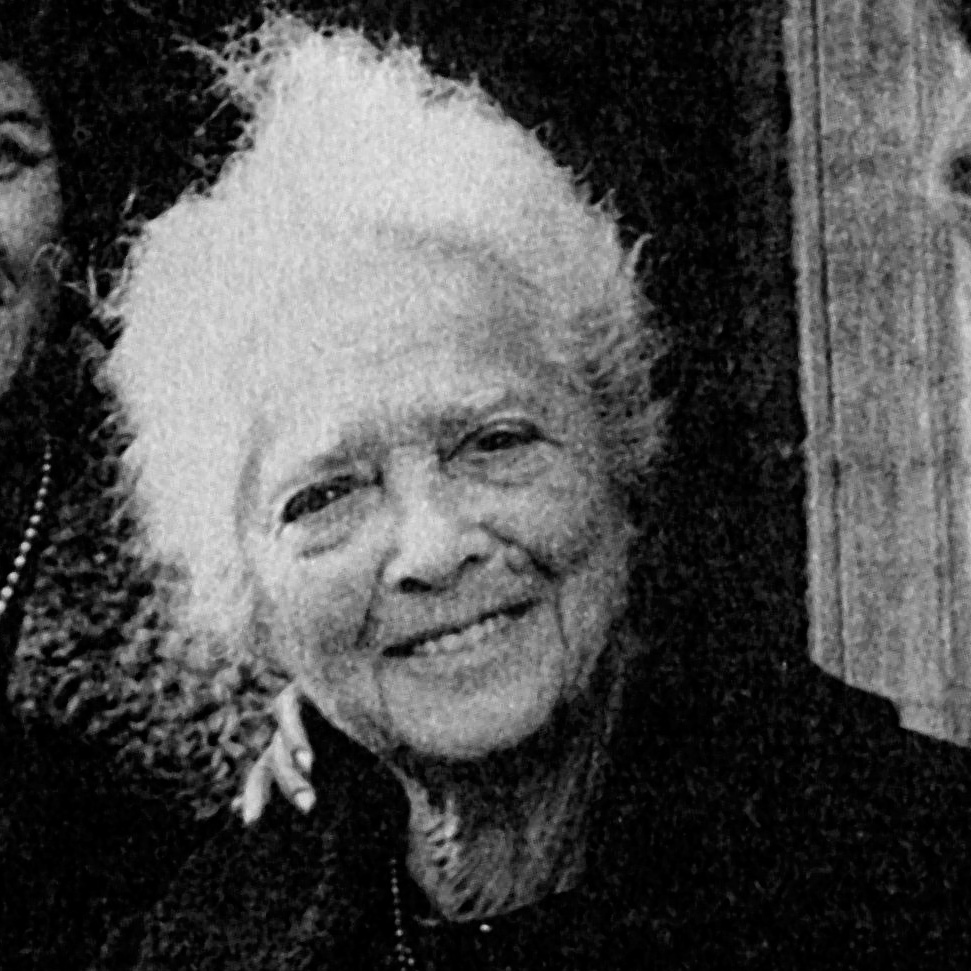
- Born: Ada Giaquinto; 11 October 1881; Rome, Italy
- Died: 2 May 1973 (aged 91); Rome, Italy
- Occupations: Professional chef; cookbook author and magazine editor

Ada Boni (née Giaquinto; 1881 – May 1973) was an Italian chef, magazine editor, food writer and book author. Her most famous book, Il talismano della felicità (The Talisman of Happiness in English), published in 1928, is considered one of the classic Italian cookbooks and is still very popular. She also wrote the notable book, La cucina romana (Roman Cuisine in English), with the stated aim of saving traditional cuisine that was being lost.

== Life ==
Ada Boni was born as Ada Giaquinto in 1881 in Rome. She was either the granddaughter or the niece of Adolfo Giaquinto (1846–1937). Adolfo was a famous chef in Italy, and founded a fortnightly gastronomical periodical called Il Messaggero della Cucina. Boni co-founded with her husband Enrico the women's magazine Preziosa, and was then its editor. From 1915 started to publish her own recipes in its pages. A collection of her recipes was published by Preziosa in 1925, and in 1929 another larger collection was published.

In 1928 Boni published Il talismano della felicità (The Talisman of Happiness in English), which was an encyclopaedic collection of more than 850 recipes from across Italy. The book has been called the Italian Joy of Cooking, and became a popular present for newly-wed couples. It contained helpful advice to cooks as well as recipes, and was presented in a user-friendly way. In 1950 the book was published in New York in English as The Talisman Italian Cookbook: Italy's Bestselling Cookbook Adapted for American Kitchens, with alterations to suit American tastes.

Boni also wrote the notable book, La cucina romana (Roman Cuisine in English), with the stated aim of saving traditional cuisine that was being lost.

Boni also ran a cooking school in Rome, and had a radio show. She died at home in Rome in May 1973 of pneumonia, aged 92.

== Bibliography ==
- Boni, Ada (1929). Il talismano della felicità. I Ed.
- Boni, Ada (1930). La cucina romana. Rome: Edizioni di Preziosa.
- Boni, Ada Elogio della cucina italiana (Praise of Italian Cuisine), translated into English and Spanish
- Boni, Ada (1949). Prime esperienze di una piccola cuoca (Early Experiences of a Small Cook)
- Boni, Ada (1969). Cucina regionale italiana. Mondadori. Published as Italian Regional Cooking in English by Bonanza Books in 1969
- Riolo, Claudio (2004). "Ada Boni" in Le Italiane. vol. II.

== See also ==
- Italian cuisine
