= Linguistic rights =

Right to choose one's own language

Linguistic rights are the human and civil rights concerning the individual and collective right to choose the language or languages for communication in a private or public atmosphere. Other parameters for analyzing linguistic rights include the degree of territoriality, amount of positivity, orientation in terms of assimilation or maintenance, and overtness.

Linguistic rights include, among others, the right to one's own language in legal, administrative and judicial acts, language education, and media in a language understood and freely chosen by those concerned.

Linguistic rights in international law are usually dealt in the broader framework of cultural and educational rights.

Important documents for linguistic rights include the Universal Declaration of Linguistic Rights (1996), the European Charter for Regional or Minority Languages (1992), the Convention on the Rights of the Child (1989) and the Framework Convention for the Protection of National Minorities (1988), as well as Convention against Discrimination in Education and the International Covenant on Civil and Political Rights (1966).

== History ==
Linguistic rights became more and more prominent throughout the course of history as language came to be increasingly seen as a part of nationhood. Although policies and legislation involving language have been in effect in early European history, these were often cases where a language was being imposed upon people while other languages or dialects were neglected. Most of the initial literature on linguistic rights came from countries where linguistic and/or national divisions grounded in linguistic diversity have resulted in linguistic rights playing a vital role in maintaining stability. However, it was not until the 1900s that linguistic rights gained official status in politics and international accords.

Linguistic rights were first included as an international human right in the Universal Declaration of Human Rights in 1948.

Formal treaty-based language rights are mostly concerned with minority rights. The history of such language rights can be split into five phases.

1. Pre-1815. Language rights are covered in bilateral agreements, but not in international treaties, e.g. Treaty of Lausanne (1923).
2. Final Act of the Congress of Vienna (1815). The conclusion to Napoleon I's empire-building was signed by 7 European major powers. It granted the right to use Polish to Poles in Poznan alongside German for official business. Also, some national constitutions protects the language rights of national minorities, e.g. Austrian Constitutional Law of 1867 grants ethnic minorities the right to develop their nationality and language.
3. Between World I and World War II. Under the aegis of the League of Nations, Peace Treaties and major multilateral and international conventions carried clauses protecting minorities in Central and Eastern Europe, e.g., the right to private use of any language, and provision for instruction in primary schools through medium of own language. Many national constitutions followed this trend. But not all signatories provided rights to minority groups within their own borders such as United Kingdom, France, and US. Treaties also provided right of complaint to League of Nations and International Court of Justice.
4. 1945–1970s. International legislation for protection of human rights was undertaken within infrastructure of United Nations. Mainly for individual rights and collective rights to oppressed groups for self-determination.
5. Early 1970s onwards, there was a renewed interest in rights of minorities, including language rights of minorities. e.g. UN Declaration on the Rights of Persons Belonging to National or Ethnic, Religious and Linguistic Minorities.

== Theoretical discussion ==
=== Language rights + human rights = linguistic human rights (LHR) ===
Some make a distinction between language rights and linguistic human rights because the former concept covers a much wider scope. Thus, not all language rights are LHR, although all LHR are language rights. One way of distinguishing language rights from LHR is between what is necessary, and what is enrichment-oriented. Necessary rights, as in human rights, are those needed for basic needs and for living a dignified life, e.g. language-related identity, access to mother tongue(s), right of access to an official language, no enforced language shift, access to formal primary education based on language, and the right for minority groups to perpetuate as a distinct group, with own languages. Enrichment rights are above basic needs, e.g. right to learn foreign languages.

=== Individual linguistic rights ===
The most basic definition of linguistic rights is the right of individuals to use their language with other members of their linguistic group, regardless of the status of their language. They evolve from general human rights, in particular: non-discrimination, freedom of expression, right to private life, and the right of members of a linguistic minority to use their language with other members of their community.

Individual linguistic rights are provided for in the Universal Declaration of Human Rights:

- Article 2 – all individuals are entitled to the rights declared without discrimination based on language.
- Article 10 – individuals are entitled to a fair trial, and this is generally recognized to involve the right to an interpreter if an individual does not understand the language used in criminal court proceedings, or in a criminal accusation. The individual has the right to have the interpreter translate the proceedings, including court documents.
- Article 19 – individuals have the right to freedom of expression, including the right to choose any language as the medium of expression.
- Article 26 – everyone has the right to education, with relevance to the language of medium of instruction.

Linguistic rights can be applied to the private arena and the public domain.

==== Private use of language ====
Most treaties or language rights documents distinguish between the private use of a language by individuals and the use of a language by public authorities. Existing international human rights mandate that all individuals have the right to private and family life, freedom of expression, non-discrimination and/or the right of persons belonging to a linguistic minority to use their language with other members of their group. The United Nations Human Rights Committee defines privacy as:

... the sphere of a person's life in which he or she can freely express his or her identity, be it by entering into relationships with others or alone. The Committee is of the view that a person's surname [and name] constitutes an important component of one's identity and that the protection against arbitrary or unlawful interference with one's privacy includes the protection against arbitrary or unlawful interference with the right to choose and change one's own name.

This means that individuals have the right to have their name or surname in their own language, regardless of whether the language is official or recognised, and state or public authorities cannot interfere with this right arbitrarily or unlawfully.

==== Linguistic rights in the public domain ====
The public domain, with respect to language use, can be divided into judicial proceedings and general use by public officials.

According to Article 10 of the Universal Declaration of Human Rights, individuals have the right to a fair trial. Therefore, in the name of fairness of judicial proceedings, it is an established linguistic right of an individual to an interpreter when he or she does not understand the language used in criminal court proceedings, or in a criminal accusation. The public authorities must either use the language which the individual understands, or hire an interpreter to translate the proceedings, including court cases.

General use by public officials can cover matters including public education, public radio and television broadcasting, the provision of services to the public, and so on. It is often accepted to be reasonable and justified for public officials to use the language of minorities, to an appropriate degree and level in their activities, when the numbers and geographic concentration of the speakers of a minority language are substantial enough. However, this is a contentious topic as the decision of substantiation is often arbitrary. The International Covenant on Civil and Political Rights, Article 26, does promise to protect all individuals from discrimination on the grounds of language. Following that, Article 27 declares, "minorities shall not be denied the right... to use their own language". The Convention against Discrimination in Education, Article 5, also does declares the rights for minorities to "use or teach their own language".

=== Collective linguistic rights ===
Collective linguistic rights are linguistic rights of a group, notably a language group or a state. Collective rights mean "the right of a linguistic group to ensure the survival of its language and to transmit the language to future generations". Language groups are complex and more difficult to demarcate than states. Part of this difficulty is that members within language groups assign different roles to their language, and there are also difficulties in defining a language. Some states have legal provisions for the safeguard of collective linguistic rights because there are clear-cut situations under particular historical and social circumstances.

Collective linguistic rights apply to states because they express themselves in one or more languages. Generally, the language régime of states, which is communicated through allocation of statuses to languages used within its boundaries, qualifies linguistic rights claimed by groups and individuals in the name of efficient governance, in the best interest of the common good. States are held in check by international conventions and the demands of the citizens. Linguistic rights translate to laws differently from country to country, as there is no generally accepted standard legal definition.

=== Territoriality vs. personality principles ===
The principle of territoriality refers to linguistic rights being focused solely within a territory, whereas the principle of personality depends on the linguistic status of the person(s) involved. An example of the application of territoriality is the case of Switzerland, where linguistic rights are defined within clearly divided language-based cantons. An example of the application of personality is in federal Canadian legislation, which grants the right to services in French or English regardless of territory.

=== Negative vs. positive rights ===
Negative linguistic rights mean the right for the exercise of language without the interference of the State. Positive linguistic rights require positive action by the State involving the use of public money, such as public education in a specific language, or state-provided services in a particular language.

=== Assimilation-oriented vs. maintenance-oriented ===
Assimilation-oriented types of language rights refer to the aim of the law to assimilate all citizens within the country, and range from prohibition to toleration. An example of prohibition type laws is the treatment of Kurds in Turkey where they had been forbidden to use the Kurdish language. Assimilation-oriented approaches to language rights can also be seen as a form of focus on the individuals right to communicate with others inside a system. Many policies of linguistic assimilation being tied to the concept of nation building and facilitating communication between various groups inside of a singular state system.

Maintenance-oriented types of language rights refer to laws aiming to enable the maintenance of all languages within a country, and range from permission to promotion. An example of laws that promote language rights is the Basque Normalization Law, where the Basque language is promoted. Many maintenance-oriented approaches require both a framework of collective and positive rights and significant government funding in order to produce the desired outcomes of linguistic maintenance. In Wales and Quebec, for example, there is significant debate over funding and the use of collective rights in building an effective maintenance framework.

The neutral point between assimilation-orientation and maintenance-orientation is non-discrimination prescription, which forbids discrimination based on language. However the non-discrimination position has also been seen as just another form of assimilationist policy as its primarily just leads to a more extended period of assimilation into the majority language rather than a perpetual continuation of the minority language.

=== Overt vs. covert ===
Another dimension for analyzing language rights is with degree of overtness and covertness. Degree of overtness refers to the extent laws or covenants are explicit with respect to language rights, and covertness the reverse. For example, Indian laws are overt in promoting language rights, whereas the English Language Amendments to the US Constitution are overt prohibition. The Charter of the United Nations, the Universal Declaration of Human Rights, the International Covenant on Economic, Social and Cultural Rights, the International Covenant on Civil and Political Rights, and the UN Convention on the Rights of the Child all fall under covert toleration.

=== Criticisms of the framework of linguistic human rights ===
Some have criticized linguistic rights proponents for taking language to be a single coherent construct, pointing out instead the difference between language and speech communities, and putting too much concern on inter-language discrimination rather than intra-language discrimination.

Other issues pointed out are the assumptions that the collective aims of linguistic minority groups are uniform, and that the concept of collective rights is not without its problems.

There is also the protest against the framework of Linguistic Human Rights singling out minority languages for special treatment, causing limited resources to be distributed unfairly. This has led to a call for deeper ethnographic and historiographic study into the relationship between speakers' attitudes, speakers' meaning, language, power, and speech communities.

== Practical application ==
Linguistic rights manifest as legislation (the passing of a law), subsequently becoming a statute to be enforced. Language legislation delimiting official usage can by grouped into official, institutionalizing, standardizing, and liberal language legislation, based on its function:

Official legislation makes languages official in the domains of legislation, justice, public administration, and education, [commonly according to territoriality and personality]. Various combinations of both principles are also used.... Institutionalizing legislation covers the unofficial domains of labour, communications, culture, commerce, and business....

In relation to legislation, a causal effect of linguistic rights is language policy. The field of language planning falls under language policy. There are three types of language planning: status planning (uses of language), acquisition planning (users of language), and corpus planning (language itself).

=== Language rights at international and regional levels ===
==== International platform ====
The Universal Declaration of Linguistic Rights was approved on 6 June 1996 in Barcelona, Spain. It was the culmination of work by a committee of 50 experts under the auspices of UNESCO. Signatories were 220 persons from over 90 states, representing NGOs and International PEN Clubs Centres. This Declaration was drawn up in response to calls for linguistic rights as a fundamental human right at the 12th Seminar of the International Association for the Development of Intercultural Communication and the Final Declaration of the General Assembly of the International Federation of Modern Language Teachers. Linguistic rights in this Declaration stems from the language community, i.e., collective rights, and explicitly includes both regional and immigrant minority languages.

Overall, this document is divided into sections including: Concepts, General Principles, Overall linguistic regime (which covers Public administration and official bodies, Education, Proper names, Communications media and new technologies, Culture, and The socioeconomic sphere), Additional Dispositions, and Final Dispositions. So for instance, linguistic rights are granted equally to all language communities under Article 10, and to everyone, the right to use any language of choice in the private and family sphere under Article 12. Other Articles details the right to use or choice of languages in education, public, and legal arenas.

There are a number of other documents on the international level granting linguistic rights. The UN International Covenant on Civil and Political Rights, adopted by the UN General Assembly in 1966 makes international law provision for protection of minorities. Article 27 states that individuals of linguistic minorities cannot be denied the right to use their own language.

The UN Declaration on the Rights of Persons Belonging to National or Ethnic, Religious and Linguistic Minorities was adopted by the UN General Assembly in 1992. Article 4 makes "certain modest obligations on states". It states that states should provide individuals belonging to minority groups with sufficient opportunities for education in their mother tongue, or instruction with their mother tongue as the medium of instruction. However, this Declaration is non-binding.

A third document adopted by the UN General Assembly in 1989, which makes provisions for linguistic rights is the Convention on the Rights of the Child. In this convention, Articles 29 and 30 declare respect for the child's own cultural identity, language and values, even when those are different from the country of residence, and the right for the child to use his or her own language, in spite of the child's minority or immigrant status.

==== Regional platform ====
===== Africa =====
Linguistic rights in Africa have only come into focus in recent years. In 1963, the Organisation of African Unity (OAU) was formed to help defend the fundamental human rights of all Africans. It adopted in 1981 the African Charter on Human and Peoples' Rights, which aims to promote and protect fundamental human rights, including language rights, in Africa. In 2004, fifteen member states ratified the Protocol to the African Charter on Human and Peoples' Rights Establishing the African Court on Human and Peoples' Rights. The Court is a regional, legal platform that monitors and promotes the AU states' compliance with the African Charter on Human and Peoples' Rights. It is currently pending a merger with the Court of Justice of the African Union.

In 2001 the President of the Republic of Mali, in conjunction with the OAU, set up the foundation for the African Academy of Languages (ACALAN) to "work for the promotion and harmonisation of languages in Africa". Along with the inauguration of the Interim Governing Board of the ACALAN, the African Union declared 2006 as the Year of African Languages (YOAL).

In 2002, the OAU was disbanded and replaced by the African Union (AU). The AU adopted the Constitutive Act previously drawn up by the OAU in 2000. In Article 25, it is stated that the working languages of the Union and its institutions are Arabic, English, French and Portuguese, and if possible, all African languages. The AU also recognizes the national languages of each of its member institutions as stated in their national constitutions. In 2003, the AU adopted a protocol amending the Act such that working languages shall be renamed as official languages, and would encompass Spanish, Kiswahili and "any other African language" in addition to the four aforementioned languages. However, this Amendment has yet to be put into force, and the AU continues to use only the four working languages for its publications.

===== Europe =====
The Council of Europe adopted the European Convention on Human Rights in 1950, which makes some reference to linguistic rights. In Article 5.2, reasons for arrest and charges have to be communicated in a language understood by the person. Secondly, Article 6.3 grants an interpreter for free in a court, if the language used cannot be spoken or understood.

The Council for Local and Regional Authorities, part of the Council of Europe, formulated the European Charter for Regional or Minority Languages in 1992. This Charter grants recognition, protection, and promotion to regional and/or minority languages in European states, though explicitly not immigrant languages, in domains of "education, judicial authorities, administrative and public services, media, cultural activities, and socio-economic life" in Articles 8 to 13. Provisions under this Charter are enforced every three years by a committee. States choose which regional and/or minority languages to include.

The Framework Convention for the Protection of National Minorities was implemented by the Council of Europe in 1995 as a "parallel activity" to the Charter for Regional or Minority Languages. This Framework makes provisions for the right of national minorities to preserve their language in Article 5, for the encouragement of "mutual respect and understanding and co-operation among all persons living on their territory", regardless of language, especially in "fields of education, culture and the media" in Article 6. Article 6 also aims to protect persons from discrimination based on language.

Another document adopted by the Council of Europe's Parliamentary Assembly in 1998 is the Recommendation 1383 on Linguistic Diversification. It encourages a wider variety of languages taught in Council of Europe member states in Article 5. It also recommends language education to include languages of non-native groups in Article 8.

=== Language rights in different countries ===
==== Australia ====
Zuckermann et al. (2014) proposed the enactment of "Native Tongue Title", an ex gratia compensation scheme for the loss of indigenous languages in Australia: "Although some Australian states have enacted ex gratia compensation schemes for the victims of the Stolen Generations policies, the victims of linguicide (language killing) are largely overlooked ... Existing grant schemes to support Aboriginal languages ... should be complemented with compensation schemes, which are based on a claim of right. The proposed compensation scheme for the loss of Aboriginal languages should support the effort to reclaim and revive the lost languages.

On October 11, 2017, the New South Wales (NSW) parliament passed a legislation that recognises and revives indigenous languages for the first time in Australia's history. "The NSW Government will appoint independent panel of Aboriginal language experts" and "establish languages centres".

==== Austria ====
Under the Austrian Constitutional Law (1867), Article 8(2) grants the right to maintenance and development of nationality and language to all ethnic minorities, equal rights to all languages used within the regions in domains of education, administration and public life, as well as the right to education in their own language for ethnic communities, without the necessity of acquiring a second language used in the province.

==== Canada ====
The Canadian Charter of Rights and Freedoms (1982) grants positive linguistic rights, by guaranteeing state responsibility to the French and English language communities. Section 23 declares three types of rights for Canadian citizens speaking French or English as their mother tongue and are minorities in a region. The first accords right of access to instruction in the medium of the mother tongue. The second assures educational facilities for minority languages. The third endows French and English language minorities the right to maintain and develop their own educational facilities. This control can take the form of "exclusive decision-making authority over the expenditure of funds, the appointment and direction of the administration, instructional programs, the recruitment of teachers and personnel, and the making of agreements for education and services". All of these rights apply to primary and secondary education, sustained on public funds, and depend on the numbers and circumstances.

==== China ====
Standard Chinese is promoted, which has been seen as damaging to the varieties of Chinese by some of the speakers of those languages. Efforts to protect the varieties of Chinese have been made.

==== Croatia ====
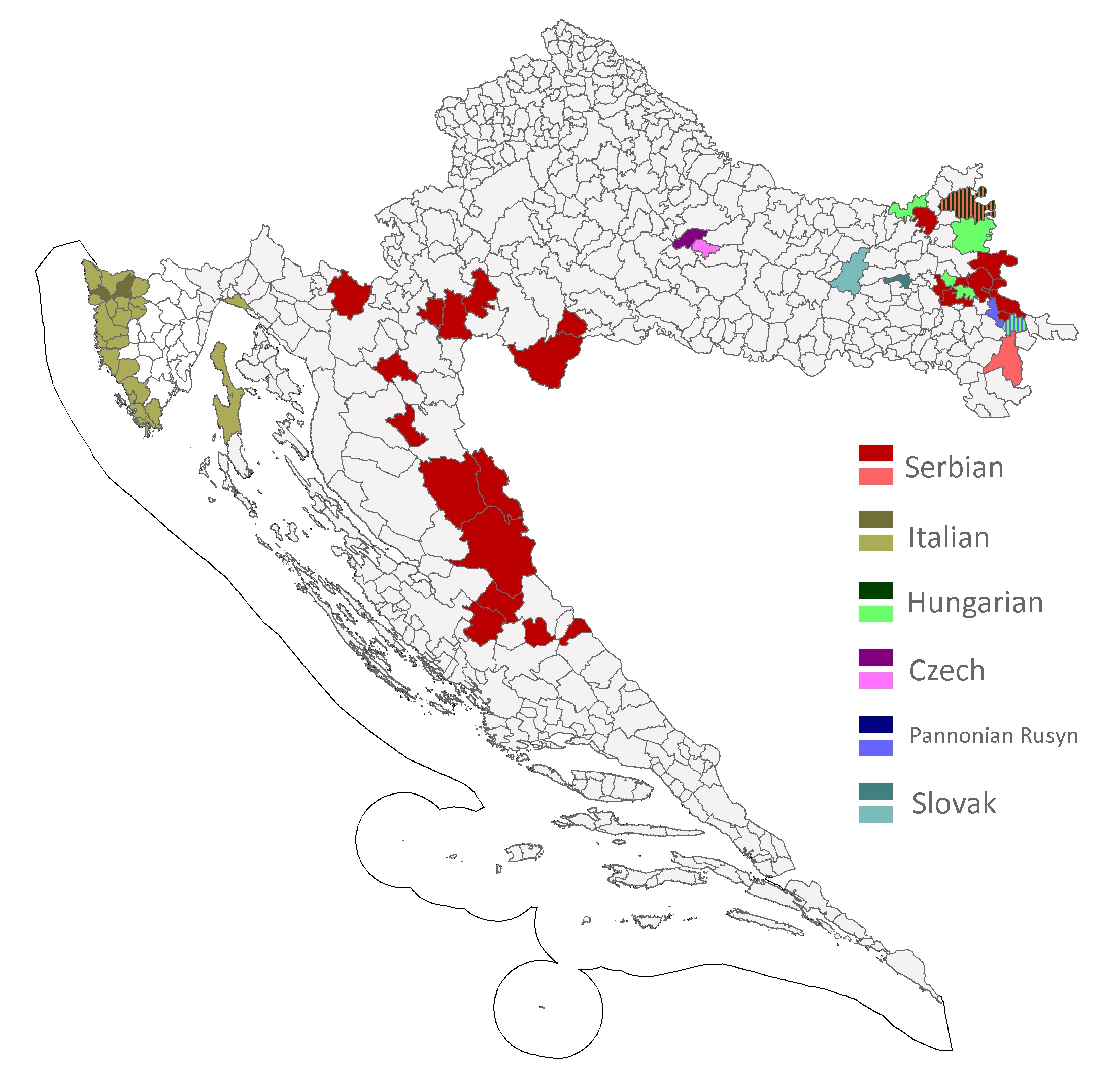
Minority languages in Croatia (official use at local level)

Croatian language is stated to be the official language of Croatia in Article 3 of the Croatian constitution. The same Article of Constitution stipulates that in some of local units, with the Croatian language and Latin script, in official use may be introduced another language or another writing script under the conditions prescribed by law. The only example of the use of minority language at the regional level currently is Istria County where official languages are Croatian and Italian. In eastern Croatia, in Joint Council of Municipalities, at local (municipal) level is introduced Serbian and its Cyrillic script as a co-official language. Each municipality, where a certain minority has more than one third of the population, can if it wants to introduce a minority language in official use.

The only currently excluded minority language in the country is Romani, a non-territorial language, although the reservation is said to be in a process of withdrawal.

==== Finland ====
Finland has one of the most overt linguistic rights frameworks. Discrimination based on language is forbidden under the basic rights for all citizens in Finland. Section 17 of the Constitution of Finland explicitly details the right to one's language and culture, although these languages are stated as either Finnish or Swedish. This right applies to in courts of law and other authorities, as well as translated official documents. There is also overt obligation of the state to provide for the "cultural and societal needs of the Finnish-speaking and Swedish-speaking populations of the country on an equal basis". In addition, the Sámi, as an indigenous group, the Roma, and other language communities have the right to maintain and develop their own language. The deaf community is also granted the right to sign language and interpretation or translation. The linguistic rights of the Sámi, the deaf community, and immigrants is further described in separate acts for each group.

Regulations regarding the rights of linguistic minorities in Finland, insist on the forming of a district for the first 9 years of comprehensive school education in each language, in municipalities with both Finnish- and Swedish-speaking children, as long as there is a minimum of 13 students from the language community of that mother tongue.

==== India ====
The constitution of India was first drafted on January 26, 1950. It is estimated that there are about 1500 languages in India. Article 343–345 declared that the official languages of India for communication with centre will be Hindi and English. There are 22 official languages identified by constitution. Article 345 states that "the Legislature of a state may by law adopt any one or more of the languages in use in the State or Hindi as the language or languages to be used for all or any of the official purposes of that State: Provided that, until the Legislature of the State otherwise provides by law, the English language shall continue to be used for those official purposes within the State for which it was being used immediately before the commencement of this Constitution".

==== Ireland ====
Language rights in Ireland are recognised in the Constitution of Ireland and in the Official Languages Act.

Irish is the national and first official language according to the Constitution (with English being a second official language). The Constitution permits the public to conduct its business – and every part of its business – with the state solely through Irish.

On 14 July 2003, the President of Ireland signed the Official Languages Act 2003 into law and the provisions of the Act were gradually brought into force over a three-year period. The Act sets out the duties of public bodies regarding the provision of services in Irish and the rights of the public to avail of those services.

The use of Irish on the country's traffic signs is the most visible illustration of the state's policy regarding the official languages. It is a statutory requirement that placenames on signs be in both Irish and English except in the Gaeltacht, where signs are in Irish only.

==== Mexico ====
Language rights were recognized in Mexico in 2003 with the General Law of Linguistic Rights for the Indigenous Peoples which established a framework for the conservation, nurturing and development of indigenous languages. It recognizes the countries Many indigenous languages as coofficial National languages, and obligates government to offer all public services in indigenous languages. As of 2014 the goal of offering most public services in indigenous languages has not been met.

==== Pakistan ====
Pakistan uses English (Pakistani English) and Urdu as official languages. Although Urdu serves as the national language and lingua franca and is understood by most of the population, it is natively spoken by only 8% of the population. English is not natively used as a first language, but, for official purposes, about 49% of the population is able to communicate in some form of English. However, major regional languages like Punjabi (spoken by the majority of the population), Sindhi, Pashto, Saraiki, Hindko, Balochi, Brahui and Shina have no official status at the federal level.

==== Philippines ====
Article XIV, Sections 6–9 of the 1987 Philippine constitution mandate the following:

- SECTION 6. The national language of the Philippines is Filipino. As it evolves, it shall be further developed and enriched on the basis of existing Philippine and other languages.

Subject to provisions of law and as the Congress may deem appropriate, the Government shall take steps to initiate and sustain the use of Filipino as a medium of official communication and as language of instruction in the educational system.

- SECTION 7. For purposes of communication and instruction, the official languages of the Philippines are Filipino and, until otherwise provided by law, English.

The regional languages are the auxiliary official languages in the regions and shall serve as auxiliary media of instruction therein.

Spanish and Arabic shall be promoted on a voluntary and optional basis.

- SECTION 8. This Constitution shall be promulgated in Filipino and English and shall be translated into major regional languages, Arabic, and Spanish.

- SECTION 9. The Congress shall establish a national language commission composed of representatives of various regions and disciplines which shall undertake, coordinate, and promote researches for the development, propagation, and preservation of Filipino and other languages.

==== Spain ====
The Spanish language is the stated to be the official language of Spain in Article 3 of the Spanish constitution, being the learning of this language compulsory by this same article. However, the constitution makes provisions for other languages of Spain to be official in their respective communities. An example would be the use of the Basque language in the Basque Autonomous Community (BAC). Apart from Spanish, the other co-official languages are Basque, Catalan and Galician.

==== Sweden ====
In ratifying the European Charter for Regional or Minority Languages, Sweden declared five national minority languages: Saami, Finnish, Meänkieli, Romani, and Yiddish. Romani and Yiddish are non-territorial minority languages in Sweden and thus their speakers were granted more limited rights than speakers of the other three. After a decade of political debate, Sweden declared Swedish the main language of Sweden with its 2009 Language Act.

==== United States ====
Language rights in the United States are usually derived from the Fourteenth Amendment, with its Equal Protection and Due Process Clauses, because they forbid racial and ethnic discrimination, allowing language minorities to use this Amendment to claim their language rights. One example of use of the Due Process Clauses is the Meyer v. Nebraska case which held that a 1919 Nebraska law restricting foreign-language education violated the Due Process clause of the Fourteenth Amendment. Two other cases of major importance to linguistic rights were the Yu Cong Eng v. Trinidad case, which overturned a language-restrictive legislation in the Philippines, declaring that piece of legislation to be "violative of the Due Process and Equal Protection Clauses of the Philippine Autonomy Act of Congress", as well as the Farrington v. Tokushige case, which ruled that the governmental regulation of private schools, particularly to restrict the teaching of languages other than English and Hawaiian, as damaging to the migrant population of Hawaii. Both of these cases were influenced by the Meyer case, which was a precedent.

=== Disputes over linguistic rights ===
==== Basque, Spain ====
The linguistic situation for Basque is a precarious one. The Basque language is considered to be a low language in Spain, where, until about 1982, the Basque language was not used in administration. In 1978, a law was passed allowing for Basque to be used in administration side by side with Spanish in the Basque autonomous communities.

Between 1936/39 and 1975, the period of Franco's régime, the use of Basque was strictly prohibited, and thus language decline begun to occur as well. However, following the death of Franco, many Basque nationalists demanded that the Basque language be recognized. One of these groups was Euskadi Ta Askatasun (ETA). ETA had initially begun as a nonviolent group to promote Basque language and culture. However, when its demands were not met, it turned violent and evolved into violent separatist groups. Today, ETA's demands for a separate state stem partially from the problem of perceived linguistic discrimination. However, ETA called a permanent cease-fire in October 2011.

==== Faroe Islands ====
The Faroese language conflict, which occurred roughly between 1908 and 1938, has been described as political and cultural in nature. The two languages competing to become the official language of the Faroe Islands were Faroese and Danish. In the late 19th and early 20th century, the language of the government, education and Church was Danish, whereas Faroese was the language of the people. The movement towards Faroese language rights and preservation was begun in the 1880s by a group of students. This spread from 1920 onwards to a movement towards using Faroese in the religious and government sector. Faroese and Danish are now both official languages in the Faroe Islands.

==== Nepal ====
The Newars of Nepal have been struggling to save their Nepal Bhasa language, culture and identity since the 1920s. Nepal Bhasa was suppressed during the Rana (1846–1951) and Panchayat (1960–1990) regimes leading to language decline. The Ranas forbade writing in Nepal Bhasa and authors were jailed or exiled. Beginning in 1965, the Panchayat system eased out regional languages from the radio and educational institutions, and protestors were put in prison.

After the reinstatement of democracy in 1990, restrictions on publishing were relaxed; but attempts to gain usage in local state entities side by side with Nepali failed. On 1 June 1999, the Supreme Court forbade Kathmandu Metropolitan City from giving official recognition to Nepal Bhasa, and Rajbiraj Municipality and Dhanusa District Development Committee from recognizing Maithili.

The Interim Constitution of Nepal 2007 recognizes all the languages spoken as mother tongues in Nepal as the national languages of Nepal. It says that Nepali in Devanagari script shall be the language of official business, however, the use of mother tongues in local bodies or offices shall not be considered a barrier. The use of national languages in local government bodies has not happened in practice, and discouragement in their use and discrimination in allocation of resources persist. Some analysts have stated that one of the chief causes of the Maoist insurgency, or the Nepalese Civil War (1996–2006), was the denial of language rights and marginalization of ethnic groups.

==== Sri Lanka ====
The start of the conflict regarding languages in Sri Lanka goes as far back as the rule of the British. During the colonial period, English had a special and powerful position in Sri Lanka. The British ruled in Sri Lanka from the late eighteenth century to 1948. English was the official language of administration then. Just before the departure of the British, a "swabhasha" (your own language) movement was launched in a bid to phase out English slowly, replacing it with Sinhala or Tamil. However, shortly after the departure of the British the campaign, for various political reasons, evolved from advocating Sinhala and Tamil replacing English to just Sinhala replacing English.

In 1956, the first election after independence, the opposition won and the official language was declared to be Sinhala. The Tamil people were unhappy, feeling that they were greatly disadvantaged. Because Sinhala was now the official language, it made it easier for the people whose mother tongue was Sinhala to enter into government sector and also provided them with an unfair advantage in the education system. Tamils who also did not understand Sinhala felt greatly inconvenienced as they had to depend on others to translate official documents for them.

Both the Tamil and Sinhala-speaking people felt that language was crucial to their identity. The Sinhala people associated the language with their rich heritage. They were also afraid that, given that there were only 9 million speakers of the language at that time, if Sinhala was not the only official language it would eventually be slowly lost. The Tamil people felt that the Sinhala-only policy would assert the dominance of the Sinhalese people and as such they might lose their language, culture and identity.

Despite the unhappiness of the Tamil people, no big political movement was undertaken till the early 1970s. Eventually in May 1976, there was a public demand for a Tamil state. During the 1956 election the Federal party had replaced the Tamil congress. The party was bent on "the attainment of freedom for the Tamil-speaking people of Ceylon by the establishment of an autonomous Tamil state on the linguistic basis within the framework of a Federal Union of Ceylon". However it did not have much success. Thus in 1972, the Federal Party, Tamil Congress and other organizations banded together into a new party called the "Tamil United Front".

One of the catalysts for Tamil separation arose in 1972 when the Sinhala government made amendments to the constitution. The Sinhala government decided to promote Buddhism as the official religion, claiming that "it shall be the duty of the State to protect and foster Buddhism". Given that the majority of the Tamils were Hindus, this created unease. There was then a fear among the Tamils that people belonging to the "untouchable castes" would be encouraged to convert to Buddhism and then "brainwashed" to learn Sinhala as well.

Another spur was also the impatience of Tamil youth in Sri Lanka. Veteran politicians noted that current youths were more ready to engage in violence, and some of them even had ties to certain rebel groups in South India. Also in 1974, there was conference of Tamil studies organized in Jaffna. The conference turned violent. This resulted in the deaths of seven people. Consequently, about 40 – 50 Tamil youths in between the years of 1972 and 1975 were detained without being properly charged, further increasing tension.

A third stimulus was the changes in the criteria for University examinations in the early 1970s. The government decided that they wanted to standardize the university admission criteria, based on the language the entrance exams were taken in. It was noted that students who took the exams in Tamil scored better than the students who took it in Sinhala. Thus the government decided that Tamil students had to achieve a higher score than the students who took the exam in Sinhala to enter the universities. As a result, the number of Tamil students entering universities fell.

After the July 1977 election, relations between the Sinhalese and the Ceylon Tamil people became worse. There was flash violence in parts of the country. It is estimated about 100 people were killed and thousands of people fled from their homes. Among all these tensions, the call for a separate state among Tamil people grew louder.

==== Quebec, Canada ====
In Quebec, the Charter of the French Language (Bill 101) declares French as the province’s official language, impacting government, commerce, and education. It aims to promote French while protecting indigenous languages. However, it has sparked controversy, particularly among anglophones and businesses, over restrictions on English usage, leading to amendments and legal challenges since its introduction in 1977. The most recent modification is Bill 96 (2022), which strengthens the role of French in various sectors.

== See also ==
- Ballantyne, Davidson, McIntyre v. Canada
- Belgian linguistic case
- Diergaardt v. Namibia
- Freedom of speech
- International Mother Language Day
- Language geography
- Language ideology
- Language policy
- Lau v. Nichols
- Legal recognition of sign languages
- Linguistic ecology
- Yukio Tsuda (professor)
- Minae Mizumura
- Linguistic purism
- List of linguistic rights in African constitutions
- List of linguistic rights in European constitutions
- List of multilingual countries and regions
- Minoritized languages
- Minority language
- Multilingualism
- Raciolinguistics
- R. v. Beaulac
- Territorial principle

== Sources ==
- May, S. (2012) Language and Minority Rights: Ethnicity, nationalism and the politics of language, New York: Routledge.
- Skutnabb-Kangas, T. & Phillipson, R., Linguistic Human Rights: Overcoming Linguistic Discrimination, Berlin: Mouton de Gruyter, 1994.
- Faingold, E. D. (2004). "Language rights and language justice in the constitutions of the world." Language Problems & Language Planning 28(1): 11–24.
- Alexander, N. 2002. Linguistic rights, language planning and democracy in post- apartheid South Africa. In Baker, S. (ed.), Language Policy: Lessons from Global Models. Monterey, CA.: Monterey Institute of International Studies.
- Hult, F.M. (2004). Planning for multilingualism and minority language rights in Sweden. Language Policy, 3(2), 181–201.
- Bamgbose, A. 2000. Language and Exclusion. Hamburg: LIT-Verlag.
- Myers-Scotton, C. 1990. Elite closure as boundary maintenance. The case of Africa. In B. Weinstein (ed.), Language Policy and Political Development. Norwood, NJ.: Ablex Publishing Corporation.
- Tollefson, J. 1991. Planning Language, Planning Inequality. Language Policy in the Community. Longman: London and New York.
- Miller D, Branson J (2002). Nationalism and the Linguistic Rights of Deaf Communities: Linguistic Imperialism and the Recognition and Development of Sign Languages. Journal of Sociolinguistics. 2(1), 3–34.
- Asbjorn, Eide (1999). The Oslo Recommendations regarding the Linguistic Rights of National Minorities: An Overview. International Journal on Minority and Group Rights, 319–328. ISSN 1385-4879
- Woehrling, J (1999). Minority Cultural and Linguistic Rights and Equality Rights in the Canadian Charter of Rights and Freedoms. McGill Law Journal.
- Paulston, C.B (2009). Epilogue: Some Concluding Thoughts on Linguistic Human Rights. International Journal of the Sociology of Language. 127(1), 187–196. (Druviete, 1999)
- Kontra, M, Phillipson R, Skutnabb-Kangas T., Varday T, (1999). Language, a right and a resource: approaching linguistic human rights. Hungary: Akademiai Nyomda.
