= Declaration on the Rights of Persons Belonging to National or Ethnic, Religious and Linguistic Minorities =

1992 UN declaration

Declaration on the Rights of Persons Belonging to National or Ethnic, Religious and Linguistic Minorities has been adopted by the UN General Assembly on 18 December 1992, without a vote, by resolution No. 47/135.

Its key provisions include that "Persons belonging to national or ethnic, religious and linguistic minorities (hereinafter referred to as persons belonging to minorities) have the right to enjoy their own culture, to profess and practice their own religion, and to use their own language, in private and in public, freely and without interference or any form of discrimination" (Article 2.1).

== International instruments referring to the Declaration ==
Framework Convention for the Protection of National Minorities refers to the Declaration in para. 24 of its Explanatory Report.

The CIS Convention Guaranteeing the Rights of Persons Belonging to National Minorities (in other translations - Convention on the Rights of Persons Belonging to National Minorities, or Convention on the Protection of the Rights of Persons Belonging to National Minorities) refers to the Declaration in its preamble.
