= European Charter for Regional or Minority Languages =

Treaty to protect languages

CET 148
- Member states that have signed and ratified in dark green, those that have signed but not ratified in light green, those that have neither signed nor ratified in white, non-member states of the Council of Europe in grey. Source: the list of signatories at the Council of Europe website.
- Signed: 5 November 1992
- Location: Strasbourg
- Effective: 1 March 1998
- Condition: Ratification by 5 States
- Signatories: 34
- Parties: 25
- Depositary: Secretary General of the Council of Europe
- Languages: English and French

Full text
- European Charter for Regional or Minority Languages at Wikisource

The European Charter for Regional or Minority Languages (ECRML) is a European treaty (CETS 148) adopted in 1992 under the auspices of the Council of Europe to protect and promote historical regional and minority languages in Europe. However, the charter does not provide any criterion or definition for an idiom to be a minority or a regional language, and the classification stays in the hands of the national state.

The preparation for the charter was undertaken by the predecessor to the current Congress of Local and Regional Authorities, the Standing Conference of Local and Regional Authorities of Europe because involvement of local and regional government was essential. The actual charter was written in the Parliamentary Assembly based on the Congress' Recommendations. It only applies to languages traditionally used by the nationals of the State Parties (thus excluding languages used by recent immigrants from other states, see immigrant languages), which significantly differ from the majority or official language (thus excluding what the state party wishes to consider as simply local dialects of the official or majority language) and that either have a territorial basis (and are therefore traditionally spoken by populations of regions or areas within the State) or are used by linguistic minorities within the State as a whole (thereby including such languages as Yiddish, Romani and Lemko, which are used over a wide geographic area).

Some states, such as Ukraine and Sweden, have tied the status of minority language to the recognized national minorities, which are defined by ethnic, cultural and/or religious criteria, thereby circumventing the Charter's notion of linguistic minority.

Languages that are official within regions, provinces or federal units within a State (for example Catalan in Spain) are not classified as official languages of the State and may therefore benefit from the Charter. On the other hand, Ireland has been unable to sign the Charter on behalf of the Irish language (although a minority language) as it is defined as the first official language of the state. The United Kingdom has ratified the Charter in respect to (among other languages) Welsh in Wales, Scots and Gaelic in Scotland, and Irish in Northern Ireland. France, although a signatory, has been constitutionally blocked from ratifying the Charter in respect to the languages of France.

The charter provides many actions state parties can take to protect and promote historical regional and minority languages. There are two levels of protection—all signatories must apply the lower level of protection to qualifying languages. Signatories may further declare that a qualifying language or languages will benefit from the higher level of protection, which lists a range of actions from which states must agree to undertake at least 35.

The Charter does not provide procedures for reactive judicial processing in case of lack of compliance but rather an elaborate proactive regular monitoring process in which the Committee of Experts drafts formal feedback and recommendations in regard to the situation in countries parties to the charter.

== Protections ==
Countries can ratify the charter in respect of its minority languages based on Part II or Part III of the charter, which contain varying principles. Countries can treat languages differently under the charter, for example, in the United Kingdom, the Welsh language is ratified under the general Part II principles as well as the more specific Part III commitments, while until 2025 the Cornish language was ratified only under Part II.

=== Part II ===
Part II of the Charter details eight main principles and objectives upon which States must base their policies and legislation. They are seen as a framework for the preservation of the languages concerned.

- Recognition of regional or minority languages as an expression of cultural wealth.
- Respect for the geographical area of each regional or minority language.
- The need for resolute action to promote such languages.
- The facilitation and/or encouragement of the use of such languages, in speech and writing, in public and private life.
- The provision of appropriate forms and means for the teaching and study of such languages at all appropriate stages.
- The promotion of relevant transnational exchanges.
- The prohibition of all forms of unjustified distinction, exclusion, restriction or preference relating to the use of a regional or minority language and intended to discourage or endanger its maintenance or development.
- The promotion by states of mutual understanding between all the country's linguistic groups.

=== Part III ===
Part III details comprehensive rules, across a number of sectors, by which states agree to abide. Each language to which Part III of the Charter is applied must be named specifically by the government. States must select at least thirty-five of the undertakings in respect to each language. Many provisions contain several options, of varying degrees of stringency, one of which has to be chosen "according to the situation of each language". The areas from which these specific undertakings must be chosen are as follows:

- Education
- Judicial authorities
- Administrative authorities and public services
- Media
- Cultural activities and facilities
- Economic and social life
- Transfrontier exchanges

== Languages protected under the Charter ==
Countries that have ratified the Charter, and languages for which the ratification was made
| Country | Ratification | Language | Notes |
|---|---|---|---|
| Armenia | 25 January 2002 | Assyrian | Part II and III |
| Armenia | 25 January 2002 | German | Part II |
| Armenia | 25 January 2002 | Greek | Part II and III |
| Armenia | 25 January 2002 | Kurdish | Part II and III |
| Armenia | 25 January 2002 | Russian | Part II and III |
| Armenia | 25 January 2002 | Ukrainian | Part II |
| Armenia | 25 January 2002 | Yezidi | Part II and III |
| Austria | 28 June 2001 | Burgenland Croatian | (in Burgenland) |
| Austria | 28 June 2001 | Czech | (in Vienna) |
| Austria | 28 June 2001 | Hungarian | (in Burgenland and Vienna) |
| Austria | 28 June 2001 | Romani | (in Burgenland) |
| Austria | 28 June 2001 | Slovak | (in Vienna) |
| Austria | 28 June 2001 | Slovene | (in Carinthia and Styria) |
| Bosnia and Herzegovina | 21 September 2010 | Albanian | Part II and III |
| Bosnia and Herzegovina | 21 September 2010 | Czech | Part II and III |
| Bosnia and Herzegovina | 21 September 2010 | German | Part II and III |
| Bosnia and Herzegovina | 21 September 2010 | Hungarian | Part II and III |
| Bosnia and Herzegovina | 21 September 2010 | Italian | Part II and III |
| Bosnia and Herzegovina | 21 September 2010 | Ladino | Part II and III |
| Bosnia and Herzegovina | 21 September 2010 | Polish | Part II and III |
| Bosnia and Herzegovina | 21 September 2010 | Romani | Part II and III |
| Bosnia and Herzegovina | 21 September 2010 | Romanian | Part II and III |
| Bosnia and Herzegovina | 21 September 2010 | Rusyn (as Ruthenian) | Part II and III |
| Bosnia and Herzegovina | 21 September 2010 | Slovak | Part II and III |
| Bosnia and Herzegovina | 21 September 2010 | Slovene | Part II and III |
| Bosnia and Herzegovina | 21 September 2010 | Turkish | Part II and III |
| Bosnia and Herzegovina | 21 September 2010 | Ukrainian | Part II and III |
| Bosnia and Herzegovina | 21 September 2010 | Yiddish | Part II and III |
| Croatia | 5 November 1997 | Czech | |
| Croatia | 5 November 1997 | German | |
| Croatia | 5 November 1997 | Hungarian | |
| Croatia | 5 November 1997 | Boyash Romanian | |
| Croatia | 5 November 1997 | Istro-Romanian | |
| Croatia | 5 November 1997 | Italian | |
| Croatia | 5 November 1997 | Romani | |
| Croatia | 5 November 1997 | Rusyn (as Ruthenian) | |
| Croatia | 5 November 1997 | Serbian | |
| Croatia | 5 November 1997 | Slovak | |
| Croatia | 5 November 1997 | Slovene | |
| Croatia | 5 November 1997 | Ukrainian | |
| Cyprus | 26 August 2002 | Armenian | Part II (Article 7.5) |
| Cyprus | 26 August 2002 | Cypriot Maronite Arabic | Part II (Article 7) |
| Czech Republic | 15 November 2006 | Moravian Croatian | (part II only) |
| Czech Republic | 15 November 2006 | German | (part II and part III in districts Cheb, Karlovy Vary, Sokolov, Liberec, Ústí nad Labem, Český Krumlov, Opava and Svitavy) |
| Czech Republic | 15 November 2006 | Polish | (part II; and part III in Moravia-Silesia, in districts Frydek-Místek and Karviná) |
| Czech Republic | 15 November 2006 | Romani | (part II only) |
| Czech Republic | 15 November 2006 | Slovak | (parts II and III, across the whole territory) |
| Denmark | 8 September 2000 | German | (in Southern Jutland) |
| Finland | 9 November 1994 | Inari Sami | |
| Finland | 9 November 1994 | Karelian | |
| Finland | 9 November 1994 | North Sami | |
| Finland | 9 November 1994 | Romani | |
| Finland | 9 November 1994 | Russian | |
| Finland | 9 November 1994 | Skolt Sami | |
| Finland | 9 November 1994 | Swedish | |
| Finland | 9 November 1994 | Tatar | |
| Finland | 9 November 1994 | Yiddish | |
| Germany | 16 September 1998 | Danish | (in Schleswig-Holstein) |
| Germany | 16 September 1998 | Low German | (part III in Bremen, Hamburg, Mecklenburg-Vorpommern, Lower Saxony and Schleswig-Holstein); (part II in Brandenburg, Northrhine-Westphalia and Saxony-Anhalt) |
| Germany | 16 September 1998 | Lower Sorbian | (in Brandenburg) |
| Germany | 16 September 1998 | North Frisian | (in Schleswig-Holstein) |
| Germany | 16 September 1998 | Romani | (across Germany) |
| Germany | 16 September 1998 | Saterland Frisian | (in Lower Saxony) |
| Germany | 16 September 1998 | Upper Sorbian | (in the Free State of Saxony) |
| Hungary | 26 April 1995 | Armenian | |
| Hungary | 26 April 1995 | Boyash Romanian | |
| Hungary | 26 April 1995 | Bulgarian | |
| Hungary | 26 April 1995 | Croatian | |
| Hungary | 26 April 1995 | German | |
| Hungary | 26 April 1995 | Greek | |
| Hungary | 26 April 1995 | Polish | |
| Hungary | 26 April 1995 | Romani | |
| Hungary | 26 April 1995 | Romanian | |
| Hungary | 26 April 1995 | Rusyn (as Ruthenian) | |
| Hungary | 26 April 1995 | Serbian | |
| Hungary | 26 April 1995 | Slovak | |
| Hungary | 26 April 1995 | Slovene | |
| Hungary | 26 April 1995 | Ukrainian | |
| Liechtenstein | 18 November 1997 | No regional or minority languages | |
| Luxembourg | 22 June 2005 | No regional or minority languages | |
| Montenegro | 15 February 2006 | Albanian | |
| Montenegro | 15 February 2006 | Bosnian | |
| Montenegro | 15 February 2006 | Croatian | |
| Montenegro | 15 February 2006 | Romani | |
| Netherlands | 2 May 1996 | Frisian | (in Friesland, under part III) |
| Netherlands | 2 May 1996 | Limburgish | (in Limburg, under part II; see also: Controversy over the recognition of Limburgish as a regional language) |
| Netherlands | 2 May 1996 | Low Saxon | (across the Netherlands, under part II) |
| Netherlands | 2 May 1996 | Papiamento | (on Bonaire under part III) |
| Netherlands | 2 May 1996 | Romani | (across the Netherlands, under part II) |
| Netherlands | 2 May 1996 | Yiddish | (across the Netherlands, under part II) |
| Norway | 10 November 1993 | Kven | (part II only) |
| Norway | 10 November 1993 | Lule Sami | |
| Norway | 10 November 1993 | North Sami | |
| Norway | 10 November 1993 | Romanes | |
| Norway | 10 November 1993 | Romani | |
| Norway | 10 November 1993 | South Sami | |
| Poland | 12 February 2009 | Armenian | |
| Poland | 12 February 2009 | Belarusian | |
| Poland | 12 February 2009 | Czech | |
| Poland | 12 February 2009 | German | |
| Poland | 12 February 2009 | Karaim | |
| Poland | 12 February 2009 | Kashub | |
| Poland | 12 February 2009 | Lemko | |
| Poland | 12 February 2009 | Lithuanian | |
| Poland | 12 February 2009 | Romani | |
| Poland | 12 February 2009 | Russian | |
| Poland | 12 February 2009 | Slovak | |
| Poland | 12 February 2009 | Tatar | |
| Poland | 12 February 2009 | Ukrainian | |
| Poland | 12 February 2009 | Yiddish | |
| Romania | 29 January 2008 | Albanian | (Part II only) |
| Romania | 29 January 2008 | Armenian | (Part II only) |
| Romania | 29 January 2008 | Bulgarian | (Part III only) |
| Romania | 29 January 2008 | Croatian | (Part III only) |
| Romania | 29 January 2008 | Czech | (Part III only) |
| Romania | 29 January 2008 | German | (Part III only) |
| Romania | 29 January 2008 | Greek | (Part II only) |
| Romania | 29 January 2008 | Hungarian | (Part III only) |
| Romania | 29 January 2008 | Italian | (Part II only) |
| Romania | 29 January 2008 | Macedonian | (Part II only) |
| Romania | 29 January 2008 | Polish | (Part II only) |
| Romania | 29 January 2008 | Romani | (Part II only) |
| Romania | 29 January 2008 | Russian | Part II and III |
| Romania | 29 January 2008 | Rusyn (as Ruthenian) | (Part II only) |
| Romania | 29 January 2008 | Serbian | (Part III only) |
| Romania | 29 January 2008 | Slovak | (Part III only) |
| Romania | 29 January 2008 | Tatar | (Part II only) |
| Romania | 29 January 2008 | Turkish | (Part III only) |
| Romania | 29 January 2008 | Ukrainian | (Part III only) |
| Romania | 29 January 2008 | Yiddish | (Part II only) |
| Serbia | 15 February 2006(as the State union of Serbia and Montenegro) | Albanian | |
| Serbia | 15 February 2006(as the State union of Serbia and Montenegro) | Bosnian | |
| Serbia | 15 February 2006(as the State union of Serbia and Montenegro) | Bulgarian | |
| Serbia | 15 February 2006(as the State union of Serbia and Montenegro) | Bunjevac | |
| Serbia | 15 February 2006(as the State union of Serbia and Montenegro) | Croatian | |
| Serbia | 15 February 2006(as the State union of Serbia and Montenegro) | Czech | |
| Serbia | 15 February 2006(as the State union of Serbia and Montenegro) | German | |
| Serbia | 15 February 2006(as the State union of Serbia and Montenegro) | Hungarian | |
| Serbia | 15 February 2006(as the State union of Serbia and Montenegro) | Macedonian | |
| Serbia | 15 February 2006(as the State union of Serbia and Montenegro) | Romani | |
| Serbia | 15 February 2006(as the State union of Serbia and Montenegro) | Romanian | |
| Serbia | 15 February 2006(as the State union of Serbia and Montenegro) | Rusyn (as Ruthenian) | |
| Serbia | 15 February 2006(as the State union of Serbia and Montenegro) | Slovak | |
| Serbia | 15 February 2006(as the State union of Serbia and Montenegro) | Ukrainian | |
| Serbia | 15 February 2006(as the State union of Serbia and Montenegro) | "Vlach" | |
| Slovakia | 5 September 2001 | Bulgarian | |
| Slovakia | 5 September 2001 | Croatian | |
| Slovakia | 5 September 2001 | Czech | |
| Slovakia | 5 September 2001 | German | |
| Slovakia | 5 September 2001 | Hungarian | |
| Slovakia | 5 September 2001 | Polish | |
| Slovakia | 5 September 2001 | Romani | |
| Slovakia | 5 September 2001 | Russian | |
| Slovakia | 5 September 2001 | Rusyn (as Ruthenian) | |
| Slovakia | 5 September 2001 | Serbian | |
| Slovakia | 5 September 2001 | Ukrainian | |
| Slovakia | 5 September 2001 | Yiddish | |
| Slovenia | 4 October 2000 | Croatian | |
| Slovenia | 4 October 2000 | German | |
| Slovenia | 4 October 2000 | Hungarian | |
| Slovenia | 4 October 2000 | Italian | |
| Slovenia | 4 October 2000 | Romani | |
| Slovenia | 4 October 2000 | Serbian | |
| Spain | 9 April 2001 | Amazigh | (in Melilla) |
| Spain | 9 April 2001 | Aragonese | (luenga propia in Aragon) |
| Spain | 9 April 2001 | Aranese (Occitan) | (in Catalonia) |
| Spain | 9 April 2001 | Asturian | (llingua propia in Asturias) |
| Spain | 9 April 2001 | Basque | (official in the Basque Country and parts of Navarre) |
| Spain | 9 April 2001 | Catalan | (official in the Balearic Islands and Catalonia; llengua pròpia in Aragon) |
| Spain | 9 April 2001 | Ceuta Arabic | (in Ceuta) |
| Spain | 9 April 2001 | Extremaduran | (in Extremadura) |
| Spain | 9 April 2001 | Fala | (in Extremadura) |
| Spain | 9 April 2001 | Galician | (in Galicia and parts of Asturias, León and Zamora provinces; official in Galicia) |
| Spain | 9 April 2001 | Leonese | (in Castile and León) |
| Spain | 9 April 2001 | Portuguese | (in Extremadura) |
| Spain | 9 April 2001 | Valencian (Catalan dialect) | (official in the Valencian Community) |
| Sweden | 9 February 2000 | Finnish | |
| Sweden | 9 February 2000 | Lule Sami | |
| Sweden | 9 February 2000 | Meänkieli | |
| Sweden | 9 February 2000 | North Sami | |
| Sweden | 9 February 2000 | Romani | |
| Sweden | 9 February 2000 | South Sami | |
| Sweden | 9 February 2000 | Yiddish | |
| Switzerland | 23 December 1997 | Franco-Provençal | |
| Switzerland | 23 December 1997 | French | |
| Switzerland | 23 December 1997 | German | |
| Switzerland | 23 December 1997 | Italian | |
| Switzerland | 23 December 1997 | Romansh | |
| Switzerland | 23 December 1997 | Yenish | |
| Ukraine | 19 September 2005 | Belarusian | |
| Ukraine | 19 September 2005 | Bulgarian | |
| Ukraine | 19 September 2005 | Crimean Tatar | |
| Ukraine | 19 September 2005 | Czech | |
| Ukraine | 19 September 2005 | Gagauz | |
| Ukraine | 19 September 2005 | German | |
| Ukraine | 19 September 2005 | Greek | |
| Ukraine | 19 September 2005 | Hebrew | |
| Ukraine | 19 September 2005 | Hungarian | |
| Ukraine | 19 September 2005 | Karaim | |
| Ukraine | 19 September 2005 | Krymchak | |
| Ukraine | 19 September 2005 | Polish | |
| Ukraine | 19 September 2005 | Romani | |
| Ukraine | 19 September 2005 | Romanian | |
| Ukraine | 19 September 2005 | Rumeika | |
| Ukraine | 19 September 2005 | Slovak | |
| Ukraine | 19 September 2005 | Urum | |
| Ukraine | 19 September 2005 | Yiddish | |
| United Kingdom | 27 March 2001 | Cornish | (Article 2, Part II (Article 7) and Part III) |
| United Kingdom | 27 March 2001 | Irish | (Articles 2 and 3, Part II (Article 7) and Part III (Articles 8–14, with reservations)) |
| United Kingdom | 27 March 2001 | Scots | (Articles 2 and 3, Part II only (Article 7)) |
| United Kingdom | 27 March 2001 | Ulster-Scots | (Articles 2 and 3, Part II only (Article 7)) |
| United Kingdom | 27 March 2001 | Scottish Gaelic | (Articles 2 and 3, Part II (Article 7) and Part III (Articles 8–14, with reservations)) (British Nationality Act 1981, Schedule 1, Article 1(1)(c), and the Gaelic Language (Scotland) Act 2005 ) |
| United Kingdom | 27 March 2001 | Welsh | (Articles 2 and 3, Part II (Article 7) and Part III (Articles 8–14, with reservations)) (Welsh Language Act 1967 (repealed 21.12.1993) and the Welsh Language Act 1993 ) |
| Isle of Man | 27 March 2001 | Manx Gaelic | (Article 2, Part II only (Article 7)) (extension : 23 April 2003 (declaration dated 22 April 2003) The Government of the United Kingdom declares [on 23 April 2003] that the Charter should extend to the Isle of Man, being a territory for whose international relations the Government of the United Kingdom is responsible. |

== See also ==
- Euromosaic
- European languages
- Framework Convention for the Protection of National Minorities
- Languages of the European Union
- Linguistic rights
- List of Linguistic Rights in Constitutions (Europe)
- Universal Declaration of Linguistic Rights
