= List of linguistic rights in African constitutions =

Linguistic rights in Africa are stated in constitutions which differ by country. These constitutions usually state the national language(s) and/or official language(s), and may or may not explicitly allow for other languages in the country. Most of the linguistic rights stated here are negative rights, which grant freedom of usage of own language and prevent discrimination based on language.

== Linguistic rights in African constitutions ==
=== Algeria ===
Constitution as of 2020.

Article 3

(1) Arabic is the national and official language.
(2) Arabic shall remain the official language of the State.
(3) A High Council for the Arabic Language shall be established under the auspices of the President of the Republic.
(4) The High Council for the Arabic Language shall be assigned the special task of working towards the affluence of the Arabic language, the generalisation of its use in scientific and technological fields and promoting the translation into it for this purpose.

Article 4

(1) Tamazight shall also be a national and an official language.
(2) The State shall endeavour to promote and develop it in all its linguistic varieties in use throughout the national territory.
(3) An Algerian academy for the Tamazight language shall be established under the authority of the President of the Republic.
(4) It shall be supported by the work of the experts and assigned the task of providing the necessary requirements to develop the Tamazight language in order to integrate it as an official language in the future.
(5) The modalities of implementing this Article shall be stipulated by an organic law.

=== Benin ===
Constitution as adopted on 2 December 1990.

Article 11

All communities comprising the Beninese nation shall enjoy the freedom to use their spoken and written languages and to develop their own culture while respecting those of others. The state must promote the development of national languages of intercommunication.

Article 40

The state has the duty to assure the diffusion and the teaching of the Constitution, of the Universal Declaration of Human Rights of 1948, of the African Charter on Human and Peoples' Rights of 1981 as well as all of the international instruments duly ratified and relative to human rights. The state must integrate the rights of the individual into the programs of literacy and of teaching in the various scholastic and university academic cycles and into all the educational programs of the Armed Forces, of the Public Security Forces and of comparable categories. The state must equally assure the diffusion and teaching of these same rights in the national languages by all the means of mass communication, and particularly by radio and television.

=== Botswana ===
Constitution as adopted on 30 September 1966.

Article 5

(2) Any person who is arrested or detained shall be informed as soon as reasonably practicable, in a language that he understands, of the reasons for his arrest or detention.

Article 10

Every person who is charged with a criminal offence—

(b) shall be informes as soon as reasonably practicable, in a language that he or she understands and in detail, of the nature of the offence charged.
(f) shall be permitted to have without payment the assistance of an interpreter if he or she cannot understand the language used at the trial of the charge.

Article 16

(2) Where a person is detained by virtue of such an authorization as is referred to in subsection (1) of this section the following provisions shall apply—

(a) he or she shall, as soon as reasonably practicable and in any case not more than five days after the commencement of his or her detention, be furnished with a statement in writing in a language that he or she understands specifying in detail the grounds upon which he or she is detained.

Article 61

Subject to the provisions of section 62 of this Constitution, a person shall be qualified to be elected as a Member of the National Assembly if, and shall not be qualified to be so elected unless—

(d) he or she is able to speak, and, unless incapacitated by blindness or other physical cause, to read English well enough to take an active part in the proceedings of the Assembly.

Article 79

(4) Subject to the provisions of subsections (5) and (6) of this section a person shall be qualified to be elected as a Specially Elected Member of the House of Chiefs if, and shall not be qualified to be so elected unless, he—

(c) is able to speak and, unless incapacitated by blindness or other physical cause, to read English well enough to take an active part in the proceedings of the House.

=== Burkina Faso ===
Constitution as adopted on 2 June 1991.

Article 1

All Burkinabians shall be born free and equal in rights. All have an equal vocation to enjoy all the rights and all the freedoms guaranteed by the present Constitution. Discrimination of all sorts, notably those founded on race, ethnic background, region, colour, sex, language, religion, caste, political opinions, wealth and birth, shall be prohibited.

Article 35

The official language is French. The law determines the modalities of promotion and of official designation of national languages.

=== Burundi ===
Constitution as consolidated on 18 March 2005

Article 10

The national language is Kirundi. The official languages are Kirundi and other languages determined by law.

Article 13

All Burundians are equal in merit and dignity. All citizens enjoy the same laws and are entitled to the same protection under the law. No Burundian will be excluded from the social, economic or political life of the nation because of his race, language, religion, sex or ethnic origin.

Article 22

No one can be the object of discrimination, in particular of their origin, race, ethnic group, sex, color, language, social condition, religious, philosophical or political convictions, or because of a physical or mental handicap or carrying HIV/AIDS or any other incurable disease.

=== Cameroon ===
Constitution as adopted on 18 January 1996.

Article 1

(3) The official languages of the Republic of Cameroon shall be English and French, both languages having the same status. The State shall guarantee the promotion of bilingualism throughout the country. It shall endeavour to protect and promote national languages.

Article 2

Everyone is entitled to all the rights and freedoms set forth in this Declaration, without distinction of any kind, such as race, colour, sex, language, religion, political or other opinion, national or social origin, property, birth or other status.

Article 19

Everyone has the right to freedom of opinion and expression; this right includes freedom to hold opinions without interference and to seek, receive and impart information and ideas through any media and regardless of frontiers.

=== Cape Verde ===
Constitution as adopted on 25 September 1992.

Article 10

(6) The State of Cape Verde shall maintain special ties of friendship and cooperation with the countries of Portuguese official language and with the receiving countries of Capeverdean migrant workers.

Article 22

Every citizen shall have equal social dignity and be equal before the law. No one shall have privilege, benefit or be injured, deprived of any right or exempted from any duty, on account of race, sex, ascendancy, language, origin, religion, social and economic conditions, or political or ideological convictions.

Article 23

(3) Rights not granted to aliens and stateless persons may be recognized to the citizens of the Portuguese speaking countries, except for the access to being holders of the organs of sovereignty, the service in the Armed Forces and the diplomatic carrier.

=== Chad ===
Constitution as adopted on 31 March 1996.

Article 9

The official languages are French and Arabic. The law establishes the conditions of promotion and development of the national languages.

=== Congo ===
Constitution as adopted on 15 March 1992.

Article 3

(4) The official language is French.
(5) The functional national languages are Lingala and Munukutuba.

Article 11

(1) The State shall assure the equality of all citizens before the law, without discrimination of origin, social or material situation, racial, ethnic and regional origin, sex, instruction, language, attitude vis-a-vis religion and philosophy, or place of residence. It shall respect all the rights and liberties within limits compatible with public order and good mores.

Article 35

(1) Citizens shall possess a right to culture and to the respect of their cultural identity. All the communities composing the Congolese Nation shall possess the freedom to use their languages and their own culture without prejudicing those of others.

Article 42

(1) Every child, without a single discrimination based on race, color, sex, language, religion, national, social or ethnic origin, fortune or birth, shall have the right, on the part of his family, society, and the State to measures of protection which stem from his condition as a minor.

=== Democratic Republic of Congo ===
Constitution as adopted on 18 February 2006.

Article 1

The official language is French. The national languages are Kikongo, Lingala, Swahili and Tshiluba. The State ensures promotion of these languages without discrimination. The State ensures the protection of any other languages of this country which are part of Congolese cultural heritage.

Article 18

Any person arrested shall be informed immediately of the reasons for his arrest and of any charge against him and this, in a language he understands.

Article 142

In all cases, the Government provides broadcasting in French and in each of the four national languages within sixty days from the promulgation.

=== Djibouti ===
Constitution as adopted on 4 September 1992.

Article 1

It is guaranteed that everyone is equal before the law regardless of language, origin, race, sex or religion. All beliefs are respected.
The official languages are Arabic and French.

Article 3

The Republic of Djibouti is composed of all individuals recognized as members and who accept their duties regardless of language, race, sex, or religion.

Article 6

Political parties are forbidden to identify with a [particular] race, ethnicity, gender, religion, cult, language or region.

=== Egypt ===
Constitution as adopted on 11 September 1971.

Article 2

Islam is the religion of the state and Arabic its official language.

Article 40

All citizens are equal before the law. They have equal public rights and duties without discrimination between them due to race, ethnic origin, language, religion or creed.

=== Equatorial Guinea ===
Constitution as amended on 17 January 1995.

Article 4

The official language of the Republic of Equatorial Guinea shall be Spanish; aboriginal languages shall be recognized as an integral part of its national culture.

=== Eritrea ===
Constitution as adopted on 23 May 1997.

Article 4

(3) The equality of all Eritrean languages is guaranteed.

Article 14

(2) No person may be discriminated against on account of race, ethnic origin, language, colour, gender, religion, disability, age, political view, or social or economic status or any other improper factors.

Article 17

(3) Every person arrested or detained shall be informed of the grounds for his arrest or detention and of the rights he has in connection with his arrest or detention in a language he understands.

=== Ethiopia ===
Constitution as adopted on 8 December 1994.

Article 5

(1) All Ethiopian languages shall enjoy equal state recognition.
(2) Amharic shall be the working language of the Federal Government.
(3) Members of the Federation may by law determine their respective working languages.

Article 19

(1) Persons arrested have the right to be informed promptly, in a language they understand, of the reasons for their arrest and of any charge against them.
(2) Persons arrested have the right to remain silent. Upon arrest, they have the right to be informed promptly, in a language they understand, that any statement they make may be used as evidence against them in court.

Article 20

(7) [Accused persons] have the right to request the assistance of an interpreter at state expense where the court proceedings are conducted in a language which they do not understand.

Article 25

All persons are equal before the law and are entitled without any discrimination to the equal protection of the law. In this respect, the law shall guarantee to all persons equal and effective protection without discrimination on grounds of race, nation, nationality, or other social origin, colour, sex, language, religion, political or other opinion, property, birth or other status.

Article 38

Every Ethiopian national, without any discrimination based on colour, race, nation, nationality, sex, language, religion, political or other opinion or other status, has the following rights: (a) To take part in the conduct of public affairs, directly and through freely chosen representatives; (b) On the attainment of 18 years of age, to vote in accordance with law; (c) To vote and to be elected at periodic elections to any office at any level of government; elections shall be by universal and equal suffrage and shall be held by secret ballot, guaranteeing the free expression of the will of the electors.

Article 39

(2) Every Nation, Nationality and People in Ethiopia has the right to speak, to write and to develop its own language; to express, to develop and to promote its culture; and to preserve its history.
(10) A "Nation, Nationality or People" for the purpose of this Constitution, is a group of people who have or share a large measure of a common culture or similar customs, mutual intelligibility of language, belief in a common or related identities, a common psychological make-up, and who inhabit an identifiable, predominantly contiguous territory.

Article 46

States shall be delimited on the basis of the settlement patterns, language, identity and consent of the peoples concerned.

=== Ghana ===
Constitution as adopted on 28 April 1992.

Article 9

(2) Except as otherwise provided in article & of this Constitution, a person shall not be registered as a citizen of Ghana unless at the time of his application for registration he is able to speak and understand an indigenous language of Ghana.

Article 14

(2) A person who is arrested, restricted or detained shall be informed immediately; in a language that he understands, of the reasons for his arrest, restriction or detention and of his right to a lawyer of his choice.

Article 9

(2) A person charged with a criminal offence shall—

(d) be informed immediately in a language he understands, and in detail; of the nature of the offence charged;
(h) be permitted to have, without payment by him, the assistance of an interpreter where he cannot understand the language used at the trial

Article 26

(1) Every person is entitled to enjoyed, practise, profess, maintain and promote any culture, language, tradition or religion subject to the provisions of this Constitution.

Article 39

(3) The State shall foster the development of Ghanaian languages and pride in Ghanaian culture.

=== Kenya ===
Constitution as proposed on 6 May 2010.

Article 7

(1) The national language of the Republic is Kiswahili.
(2) The official languages of the Republic are Kiswahili and English.
(3) The State shall—

(a) promote and protect the diversity of language of the people of Kenya; and
(b) promote the development and use of indigenous languages, Kenyan Sign language, Braille and other communication formats and technologies accessible to persons with disabilities.

Article 27

(4) The State shall not discriminate directly or indirectly against any person on any ground, including race, sex, pregnancy, marital status, health status, ethnic or social origin, colour, age, disability, religion, conscience, belief, culture, dress, language or birth.

Article 44

(1) Every person has the right to use the language, and to participate in the cultural life, of the person’s choice.
(2) A person belonging to a cultural or linguistic community has the right, with other members of that community--

(a) to enjoy the person’s culture and use the person’s language; or
(b) to form, join and maintain cultural and linguistic associations and other organs of civil society.

Article 49

(1) An arrested person has the right—

(a) to be informed promptly, in language that the person understands, of—

(i) the reason for the arrest;
(ii) the right to remain silent; and
(iii) the consequences of not remaining silent.

(c) to communicate with an advocate, and other persons whose assistance is necessary;

Article 50

(2) Every accused person has the right to a fair trial, which includes the right—

(m) to have the assistance of an interpreter without payment if the accused person cannot understand the language used at the trial.

(3) If this Article requires information to be given to a person, the information shall be given in language that the person understands.
(7) In the interest of justice, a court may allow an intermediary to assist a complainant or an accused person to communicate with the court.

Article 54

(1) A person with any disability is entitled—

(a) to be treated with dignity and respect and to be addressed and referred to in a manner that is not demeaning;
(b) to access educational institutions and facilities for persons with disabilities that are integrated into society to the extent compatible with the interests of the person;
(c) to reasonable access to all places, public transport and information;
(d) to use Sign language, Braille or other appropriate means of communication; and
(e) to access materials and devices to overcome constraints arising from the person's disability.

(2) The State shall ensure the progressive implementation of the principle that at least five percent of the members of the public in elective and appointive bodies are persons with disabilities.

Article 56

The State shall put in place affirmative action programmes designed to ensure that minorities and marginalised groups—

(d) develop their cultural values, languages and practices

Article 120

(1) The official languages of Parliament shall be Kiswahili, English and Kenyan Sign language, and the business of Parliament may be conducted in English, Kiswahili and Kenyan Sign language.
(2) In case of a conflict between different language versions of an Act of Parliament, the version signed by the President shall prevail.

Article 259

(2) If there is a conflict between different language versions of this Constitution, the English language version prevails.

=== Lesotho ===
Constitution as adopted on 2 April 1993.

Article 3

(1) The official languages of Lesotho shall be Sesotho and English and, accordingly, no instrument or transaction shall be invalid by reason only that it is expressed or conducted in one of those languages.

Article 4

(1) Whereas every person in Lesotho is entitled, whatever his race, colour, sex, language, religion, political or other opinion, national or social origin, property, birth or other status to fundamental human rights and freedoms...

Article 6

(2) Any person who is arrested or detained shall be informed as soon as is reasonably practicable, in a language that he understands, of the reasons for his arrest or detention.

Article 12

(2) Every person who is charged with a criminal offence—

(b) shall be informed as soon as reasonably practicable, in language that he understands and in adequate detail, of the nature of the offence charged;
(f) shall be permitted to have without payment the assistance of an interpreter if he cannot understand the language used at the trial of the charge.

Article 18

(3) In this section, the expression "discriminatory" means affording different treatment to different persons attributable wholly or mainly to their respective descriptions by race, colour, sex, language, religion, political or other opinion, national or social origin, property, birth or other status whereby persons of one such description are subjected to disabilities or restrictions to which persons of another such description are not made subject or are accorded privileges or advantages which are not accorded to persons of another such description.
(5) Nothing contained in any law shall be held to be inconsistent with or in contravention of subsection (1) to the extent that it makes provision with respect to standards of qualifications (not being standards of qualifications specifically relating to race, colour, sex, language, religion, political or other opinion, national or social origin, property, birth or other status) to be required of any person who is appointed to any office in the public service, any office in a disciplined force, any office in the service of a local government authority or any office in a body corporate established by law for public purposes.

Article 21

(2) When a person is detained by virtue of any such law as is referred to in subsection (1) the following provisions shall apply, that is to say—

(a) he shall, as soon as reasonably practicable after the commencement of his detention, be furnished with a statement in writing in a language that he understands specifying in detail the grounds upon which he is detained.

Article 26

(1) Lesotho shall adopt policies aimed at promoting a society based on equality and justice for all its citizens regardless of race, colour, sex, language, religion, political or other opinion, national or social origin, property, birth or other status.

Article 58

(1) Subject to the provisions of section 59 of this Constitution, a person shall be qualified to be nominated as a Senator by the King acting in accordance with the advice of the Council of State or designated by a Principal Chief as a Senator in his place if, and shall not be so qualified unless, at the date of his nomination or designation, he—

(b) is able to speak and, unless incapacitated by blindness or other physical cause, to read and write either the Sesotho or English languages well enough to take an active part in the proceedings of the Senate.

=== Liberia ===
Constitution as adopted on 6 January 1986.

Article 41

The business of the Legislature shall be conducted in the English language or, when adequate preparations shall have been made, in one or more of the languages of the Republic as the Legislature may by resolution approve.

=== Malawi ===
Constitution as adopted on 16 May 1994.

Article 20

(1) Discrimination of persons in any form is prohibited and all persons are, under any law, guaranteed equal and effective protection against discrimination on grounds of race, colour, sex, language, religion, political or other opinion, nationality, ethnic or social origin, disability, property, birth or other status.

Article 26

Every person shall have the right to use the language and to participate in the cultural life of his or her choice.

Article 42

(1) Every person who is detained, including every sentenced prisoner, shall have the right-

(a) to be informed of the reason for his or her detention promptly, and in a language which he or she understands;

(2) Every person arrested for, or accused of, the alleged commission of an offence shall, in addition to the rights which he or she has as a detained person, have the right—

(a) promptly to be informed, in a language which he or she understands, that he or she has the right to remain silent and to be warned of the consequences of making any statement;

(f) as an accused person, to a fair trial, which shall include the right—

(ix) to be tried in a language which he or she understands or, failing this, to have the proceedings interpreted to him or her, at the expense of the State, into a language which he or she understands.

Article 51

(1) A person shall not be qualified to be nominated or elected as a member of the Parliament unless that person—

(b) is able to speak and to read the English language well enough to take an active part in the proceedings of Parliament;

Article 55

(5) The proceedings of Parliament shall be conducted in the English language and such other languages as each Chamber may prescribe in respect of its own proceedings.

Article 94

(2) A person shall not be qualified to be appointed as a Minister or Deputy Minister unless that person-

(b) is able to speak and to read the English language.

=== Mali ===
Constitution as adopted on 27 February 1992.

Article 2

All Malians are born and live free and equal in their rights and duties. Any discrimination based on social origin, color, language, race, sex, religion, or political opinion is prohibited.

Article 25

French is the official language. Law will determine the method for making official and promoting national languages.

=== Mauritius ===
Constitution as adopted on 12 March 1968.

Article 5

(2) Any person who is arrested or detained shall be informed as soon as reasonably practicable, in a language that he understands, of the reasons for his arrest or detention.
(4) Where a person is detained in pursuance of any such provision of law as is referred to in subsection (1)(k)—

(a) he shall, as soon as is reasonably practicable and, in any case not more than 7 days after the commencement of his detention, be furnished with a statement in writing in a language that he understands specifying in detail the grounds upon which he is detained;

Article 10

(2) Every person who is charged with a criminal offence—

(b) shall be informed as soon as reasonably practicable, in a language that he understands and, in detail, of the nature of the offence;
(f) shall be permitted to have without payment the assistance of an interpreter if he cannot understand the language used at the trial of the offence.

Article 15

(4) Where any person whose freedom of movement has been restricted in pursuance of subsection 3(a) or (b) so requests—

(a) he shall, as soon as is reasonably practicable and in any case not more than 7 days after the making of the request, be furnished with a statement in writing in a language that he understands, specifying the grounds for the imposition of the restriction;

Article 18

(3) Where a person is detained by virtue of any such law as is referred to in subsection (1) (not being a person who is detained because he is a person who, not being a citizen of Mauritius, is a citizen of a country with which Mauritius is at war, or has been engaged in hostilities against Mauritius in association with or on behalf of such a country or otherwise assisting or adhering to such a country) —

(a) he shall, as soon as is reasonably practicable and in any case not more than 7 days after the commencement of his detention, be furnished with a statement in writing in a language that he understands, specifying in detail the grounds upon which he is detained.

Article 33

Subject to section 34, a person shall be qualified to be elected as a member of the Assembly if, and shall not be so qualified unless, he ... (d) is able to speak and, unless incapacitated by blindness or other physical cause, to read the English language with a degree of proficiency sufficient to enable him to take an active part in the proceedings of the Assembly.

Article 34

(1) No person shall be qualified to be elected as a member of the Assembly who—

(c) is a party to, or a partner in a firm or a director or manager of a company which is a party to, any contract with the Government for or on account of the public service, and has not, within 14 days after his nomination as a candidate for election, published in the English language in the Gazette and in a newspaper circulating in the constituency for which he is a candidate, a notice setting out the nature of such contract and his interest, or the interest of any such firm or company, therein;

Article 49

The official language of the Assembly shall be English but any member may address the chair in French.

=== Mozambique ===
Constitution as adopted on 21 January 2005.

Article 9

The State shall esteem national languages as cultural and educational heritage, and shall promote their development and increasing use as languages that convey our identity.

Article 10

The official language in the Republic of Mozambique shall be Portuguese.

Article 21

The Republic of Mozambique shall maintain special ties of friendship and co-operation with the countries of the region, with countries whose official language is Portuguese and with countries that host Mozambican emigrants.

Article 27

(1) Mozambican nationality may be granted by naturalisation to foreigners who, at the time of submission of their application, meet all the following conditions:

(c) that they know Portuguese or a Mozambican language;

Article 125

(2) The State shall promote the creation of conditions for learning and developing sign language.

=== Namibia ===
Constitution as adopted in February 1990.

Article 3

(1) The official language of Namibia shall be English.
(2) Nothing contained in this Constitution shall prohibit the use of any other language as a medium of instruction in private schools or in schools financed or subsidised by the State, subject to compliance with such requirements as may be imposed by law, to ensure proficiency in the official language, or for pedagogic reasons.
(3) Nothing contained in Paragraph (1) shall preclude legislation by Parliament which permits the use of a language other than English for legislative, administrative and judicial purposes in regions or areas where such other language or languages are spoken by a substantial component of the population.

Article 11

(2) No persons who are arrested shall be detained in custody without being informed promptly in a language they understand of the grounds for such arrest.

Article 19

Every person shall be entitled to enjoy, practice, profess, maintain and promote any culture, language, tradition or religion subject to the terms of this Constitution and further subject to the condition that the rights protected by this article do not impinge upon the rights of others or the national interest.

Article 24

(2) Where any persons are detained by virtue of such authorization as is referred to in Paragraph (1), the following provisions shall apply:

(a) they shall, as soon as reasonably practicable and in any case not more than five (5) days after the commencement of their detention, be furnished with a statement in writing in a language that they understand specifying in detail the grounds upon which they are detained and, at their request, this statement shall be read to them;

(b) not more than fourteen (14) days after the commencement of their detention, be furnished with a statement in writing in a language that they understand specifying in detail the grounds upon which they are detained and, at their request, this statement shall be read to them

=== Niger ===
Constitution as adopted on 18 July 1999.

Article 3

All communities comprising the nation of Niger shall enjoy the freedom of using their own languages in respect to each other. These languages shall have equal status as national languages. The law shall determine methods of promoting and of formalising the national language. The official language shall be French.

Article 33

The state shall have the duty to ensure the translation into national languages, the spreading and teaching of the Constitution, as well as individual rights and fundamental liberties. A National Commission shall watch over the promotion and the effectiveness of the rights and liberties proclaimed above, and if need be, in accordance with international agreements signed by Niger. A law shall determine the organisation and functioning of the Commission.

=== Nigeria ===
Constitution as adopted on 29 May 1999.

Article 15

(2) Accordingly, national integration shall be actively encouraged, whilst discrimination on the grounds of place of origin, sex, religion, status, ethnic or linguistic association or ties shall be prohibited.
(3) For the purpose of promoting national integration, it shall be the duty of the State to:

(c) encourage inter-marriage among persons from different places of origin, or of different religious, ethnic or linguistic association or ties;
(d) promote or encourage the formation of associations that cut across ethnic, linguistic, religious and or other sectional barriers.

Article 35

(3) Any person who is arrested or detained shall be informed in writing within twenty-four hours (and in a language that he understands) of the facts and grounds for his arrest or detention.

Article 36

(6) Every person who is charged with a criminal offence shall be entitled to—

(a) be informed promptly in the language that he understands and in detail of the nature of the offence;
(e) have, without payment, the assistance of an interpreter if he cannot understand the language used at the trial of the offence.

Article 97

The business of a House of Assembly shall be conducted in English, but the House may in addition to English conduct the business of the House in one or more other languages spoken in the State as the House may by resolution approve.

=== Rwanda ===
Constitution as adopted on 26 May 2003.

Article 5

The national language is Kinyarwanda. The official languages are Kinyarwanda, French and English.

Article 11

All Rwandans are born and remain free and equal in rights and duties.
Discrimination of whatever kind based on inter alia, ethnic origin, tribe, clan, colour, sex, region, social origin, religion or faith, opinion, economic status, culture, language, social status, physical or mental disability or any other form of discrimination is prohibited and punishable by law.

=== Senegal ===
Constitution as adopted on 7 January 2001.

Article 1

...The official language of the Republic of Senegal shall be French. The national languages shall be Diolo, Malinke, Poular, Serer, Soninke and Wolof and any other national language which has been codified.

Article 4

Political parties and coalitions of political parties shall contribute to the expression of suffrage. They shall be required to respect the Constitution and thus the principles of national sovereignty and democracy. They are prevented from identifying themselves by race, ethnicity, sex, religion, sect, language or region.

Article 22

The state shall have the duty and the task of educating and training the youth through public schools. All children, boys and girls, throughout the national territory, shall have the right to attend school. Religious and non-religious institutions and communities shall also be recognised as educational facilities. All national, public or private institutions shall have the duty to see to it that their members learn to read and write; they shall have the duty to participate in the national literacy effort which aims to ensure that everyone can read and write one of the national languages.

=== Seychelles ===
Constitution as adopted on 18 June 1993.

Article 4

(1) The national languages of Seychelles shall be Creole, English and French.
(2) Notwithstanding clause (1), a person may use any of the national languages for any purpose but a law may provide for the use of any one or more of the national languages for any specific purpose.

Article 18

(3) A person who is arrested or detained has a right to be informed at the time of arrest or detention or as soon as is reasonably practicable thereafter in, as far as is practicable, a language that the person understands of the reason for the arrest or detention, a right to remain silent, a right to be defended by a legal practitioner of the person's choice and, in the case of a minor, a right to communicate with the parent or guardian.

Article 19

(2) Every person who is charged with an offence—

(b) shall be informed at the time the person is charged or as soon as is reasonably practicable, in, as far as is practicable, a language that the person understands and in detail, of the nature of the offence;
(f) shall, as far as is practicable, have without payment the assistance of an interpreter if the person cannot understand the language used at the trial of the charge;

Article 43

(4) Where a law referred to in clause (2) provides for the detention of persons provision shall be made in the law—

(a) that, as soon as is reasonably practicable and in any case not more than seven days after the commencement of the detention, the person detained shall be furnished with a statement in writing, in, as far as practicable a language that the person understands, specifying in detail the grounds upon which the person is detained

=== Sierra Leone ===
Constitution as amended on 1 October 1991.

Article 6

(2) Accordingly, the State shall promote national integration and unity and discourage discrimination on the grounds of place of origin, circumstance of birth, sex, religion, status, ethnic or linguistic association or ties.

Article 9

(3) The Government shall promote the learning of indigenous languages and the study and application of modern science, foreign languages, technology, commerce and business.

Article 17

(2) Any person who—

(a) is arrested or detained shall be informed in writing or in a language that he understands at the time of his arrest, and in any event not later than twenty-four hours, of the facts and grounds for his arrest or detention;

Article 23

(5) Every person who is charged with a criminal offence—

(a) shall be informed at the time he is charged in the language which he understands and in detail, of the nature of the offence charged;
(e) shall be permitted to have without payment the assistance of an interpreter if he cannot understand the language used at the trial of the charge:
Provided that nothing contained in or done under the authority of any law shall be held to be inconsistent with or in contravention of this subsection to the extent that the law in question prohibits legal representation in a Local Court.

Article 75

Subject to the provisions of section 76, any person who—

(d) is able to speak and to read the English Language with a degree of proficiency sufficient to enable him to take an active part in the proceedings of Parliament, shall be qualified for election as such a Member of Parliament:
Provided that a person who becomes a citizen of Sierra Leone by registration by law shall not be qualified for election as such a Member of Parliament or of any Local Authority unless he shall have resided continuously in Sierra Leone for twenty-five years after such registration or shall have served in the Civil or Regular Armed Services of Sierra Leone for a continuous period of twenty-five years.

Article 90

The business of Parliament shall be conducted in the English Language.

=== South Africa ===
Constitution as adopted on 8 May 1996.

Article 6

(1) The official languages of the Republic are Sepedi, Sesotho, Setswana, siSwati, Tshivenda, Xitsonga, Afrikaans, English, isiNdebele, isiXhosa and isiZulu.
(2) Recognising the historically diminished use and status of the indigenous languages of our people, the state must take practical and positive measures to elevate the status and advance the use of these languages.
(3) (a) The national government and provincial governments may use any particular official languages for the purposes of government, taking into account usage, practicality, expense, regional circumstances and the balance of the needs and preferences of the population as a whole or in the province concerned; but the national government and each provincial government must use at least two official languages.

(b) Municipalities must take into account the language usage and preferences of their residents.

(4) The national government and provincial governments, by legislative and other measures, must regulate and monitor their use of official languages. Without detracting from the provisions of subsection (2), all official languages must enjoy parity of esteem and must be treated equitably.
(5) A Pan South African Language Board established by national legislation must—

(a) promote and create conditions for the development and use of—

(i) all official languages;
(ii) the Khoi, Nama and San languages; and
(iii) sign language; and

(b) promote and ensure respect for—

(i) all languages commonly used by communities in South Africa, including German, Greek, Gujarati, Hindi, Portuguese, Tamil, Telugu and Urdu; and
(ii) Arabic, Hebrew, Sanskrit and other languages used for religious purposes in South Africa.

Article 9

(3) The state may not unfairly discriminate directly or indirectly against anyone on one or more grounds, including race, gender, sex, pregnancy, marital status, ethnic or social origin, colour, sexual orientation, age, disability, religion, conscience, belief, culture, language and birth.
(4) No person may unfairly discriminate directly or indirectly against anyone on one or more grounds in terms of subsection (3). National legislation must be enacted to prevent or prohibit unfair discrimination.
(5) Discrimination on one or more of the grounds listed in subsection (3) is unfair unless it is established that the discrimination is fair.

Article 29

(2) Everyone has the right to receive education in the official language or languages of their choice in public educational institutions where that education is reasonably practicable. In order to ensure the effective access to, and implementation of, this right, the state must consider all reasonable educational alternatives, including single medium institutions, taking into account—

(a) equity;
(b) practicability; and
(c) the need to redress the results of past racially discriminatory laws and practices.

Article 30

Everyone has the right to use the language and to participate in the cultural life of their choice, but no one exercising these rights may do so in a manner inconsistent with any provision of the Bill of Rights.

Article 31

(1) Persons belonging to a cultural, religious or linguistic community may not be denied the right, with other members of that community—

(a) to enjoy their culture, practise their religion and use their language; and
(b) to form, join and maintain cultural, religious and linguistic associations and other organs of civil society.

(2) The rights in subsection (1) may not be exercised in a manner inconsistent with any provision of the Bill of Rights.

Article 35

(3) Every accused person has a right to a fair trial, which includes the right—

(k) to be tried in a language that the accused person understands or, if that is not practicable, to have the proceedings interpreted in that language;

(4) Whenever this section requires information to be given to a person, that information must be given in a language that the person understands.
(5) Evidence obtained in a manner that violates any right in the Bill of Rights must be excluded if the admission of that evidence would render the trial unfair or otherwise be detrimental to the administration of justice.

Article 185

(1) The primary objects of the Commission for the Promotion and Protection of the Rights of Cultural, Religious and Linguistic Communities are—

(a) to promote respect for the rights of cultural, religious and linguistic communities;
(b) to promote and develop peace, friendship, humanity, tolerance and national unity among cultural, religious and linguistic communities, on the basis of equality, non-discrimination and free association; and
(c) to recommend the establishment or recognition, in accordance with national legislation, of a cultural or other council or councils for a community or communities in South Africa.

(2) The Commission has the power, as regulated by national legislation, necessary to achieve its primary objects, including the power to monitor, investigate, research, educate, lobby, advise and report on issues concerning the rights of cultural, religious and linguistic communities.
(3) The Commission may report any matter which falls within its powers and functions to the Human Rights Commission for investigation.

Article 186

(1) The number of members of the Commission for the Promotion and Protection of the Rights of Cultural, Religious and Linguistic Communities and their appointment and terms of office must be prescribed by national legislation.
(2) The composition of the Commission must—

(a) be broadly representative of the main cultural, religious and linguistic communities in South Africa;

Article 235

The right of the South African people as a whole to self-determination, as manifested in this Constitution, does not preclude, within the framework of this right, recognition of the notion of the right of self-determination of any community sharing a common cultural and language heritage, within a territorial entity in the Republic or in any other way, determined by national legislation.

=== Sudan ===
Constitution as adopted on 1 July 1998.

Article 3

Arabic is the official language in the Republic of Sudan. The State permits the development of local languages and other international languages.

Article 27

Every sect or group of citizens have the right to keep their particular culture, language or religion, and to voluntarily bring up their children within the framework of these traditions. It is prohibited to impose one's traditions on children by coercion.

=== Swaziland ===
Constitution as adopted on 26 July 2005

Article 3

(2) The official languages of Swaziland are siSwati and English.
(3) Notwithstanding the provisions of subsection (2), the authoritative text of any law or document shall be the text in which that law or document was originally passed or produced.

Article 16

(2) A person who is arrested or detained shall be informed as soon as reasonably practicable, in a language which that person understands, of the reasons for the arrest or detention and of the right of that person to a legal representative chosen by that person.

Article 21

(2) A person who is charged with a criminal offence shall be—

(b) informed as soon as reasonably practicable, in a language which that person understands and in sufficient detail, of the nature of the offence or charge;
(g) permitted to have, without payment, the assistance of an interpreter if that person cannot understand the language used at the trial.

Article 36

(8) Where a person is detained or restricted by virtue of a power exercised in the absolute discretion of any authority and conferred by any such law as is referred to in section 38(1), the following shall apply, that is to say—

(a) that person shall, as soon as reasonably practicable and in any case not more than seventy two hours after the detention or restriction, be furnished with a statement in writing in a language that the person understands specifying in sufficient detail the grounds upon which that person is detained or restricted;

Article 121

(1) Subject to the provisions of this Constitution—

(a) each chamber of Parliament may make Standing Orders with respect to—

(iv) conduct of debates or other proceedings in that chamber in one or both official languages;

=== Togo ===
Article 3

[...]
The official language of the Republic of Togo is French.

=== Tunisia ===
Constitution as adopted on 1 June 1959

Article 1

Tunisia is a free, independent and sovereign state. Its religion is Islam, its language is Arabic and its type of government is the Republic.

Article 8

No political party may take religion, language, race, sex or region as the foundation for its principles, objectives, activity or programs.

=== Uganda ===
Constitution as adopted on 8 October 1995.

Objective XXIV

Cultural and customary values which are consistent with fundamental rights and freedoms, human dignity, democracy and with the Constitution may be developed and incorporated in aspects of Ugandan life.
The State shall—

(a) promote and preserve those cultural values and practices which enhance the dignity and well-being of Ugandans;
(b) encourage the development, preservation and enrichment of all Ugandan languages;
(c) promote the development of a sign language for the deaf; and
(d) encourage the development of a national language or languages.

Article 4

The State shall promote public awareness of this Constitution by—

(a) translating it into Ugandan languages and disseminating it as widely as possible;

Article 6

(1) The official language of Uganda is English.
(2) Subject to clause (1) of this article, any other language may be used as a medium of instruction in schools or other educational institutions or for legislative, administrative or judicial purposes as may be prescribed by law.

Article 23

(3) A person arrested, restricted or detained shall be informed immediately, in a language that the person understands, of the reasons for the arrest, restriction or detention and of his or her right to a lawyer of his or her choice.

Article 28

(3) Every person who is charged with a criminal offence shall—

(b) be informed immediately, in a language that the person understands of the nature of the offence;
(f) be afforded, without payment by that person, the assistance of an interpreter if that person cannot understand the language used at the trial:

Article 37

Every person has a right as applicable, to belong to, enjoy, practise, profess, maintain and promote any culture, cultural institution, language, tradition, creed or religion in community with others.

=== Western Sahara ===
Chapter 1, Article 3 of the constitution of the Sahrawi Arab Democratic Republic stipulates that the sole official language of Western Sahara shall be standard Arabic. In practice, Spanish is used as a working language by some Sahrawi media. The vernacular language spoken by nearly all Sahrawis, however, is Hassaniya Arabic.

=== Zambia ===
Constitution as adopted on 24 August 1991.

Article 1

(3) The official language of Zambia shall be English.

Article 13

(2) any person who is arrested or detained shall be informed as soon as reasonably practicable, in a language that he understands, of the reasons for his arrest or detention.

Article 18

(2) Every person who is charged with a criminal offence—

(b) shall be informed as soon as reasonably practicable, in a language that he understands and in detail, of the nature of the offence charged;
(f) shall be permitted to have without payment the assistance of an interpreter if he cannot understand the language used at the trial of the charge;

Article 26

(1) where a person's freedom of movement is restricted, or he is detained, under the authority of any such law as is referred to in Article 22 or 25, as the case may be, the following provisions shall apply—

(a) he shall, as soon as reasonably practicable and in any case not more than fourteen days after the commencement of his detention or restriction, be furnished with a statement in writing in a language that he understands specifying in detail the grounds upon which he is restricted or detained;

Article 64

Subject to Article 65, a person shall be qualified to be elected as a member of the National Assembly if, and shall not be qualified to be so elected unless—

(c) he is literate and conversant with the official language of Zambia.

=== Zimbabwe ===
Constitution as amended on 1 February 2007

Article 13

(3) Any person who is arrested or detained shall be informed as soon as reasonably practicable, in a language that he understands, of the reasons for his arrest or detention and shall be permitted at his own expense to obtain and instruct without delay a legal representative of his own choice and to hold communication with him.

Article 18

(3) Every person who is charged with a criminal offence—

(b) shall be informed as soon as reasonably practicable, in a language that he understands and in detail, of the nature of the offence charged;
(f) shall be permitted to have without payment the assistance of an interpreter if he cannot understand the language used at the trial of the charge;

Article 82

(1) A person shall not be qualified for appointment as a judge of the Supreme Court or the High Court unless—

(a) he is or has been a judge of a court having unlimited jurisdiction in civil or criminal matters in a country in which the common law is Roman-Dutch or English, and English is an official language;
(b) he is and has been for not less than seven years, whether continuously or not, qualified to practise as a legal practitioner—

(i) in Zimbabwe:
(ii) in a country in which the common law is Roman-Dutch and English is an official language; or
(iii) if he is a citizen of Zimbabwe, in a country in which the common law is English and English is an official language.

Article 87

(4) A tribunal appointed under subsection 2 or 3 shall consist of not less than three members selected by the President from the following—

(b) persons who hold or have held office as a judge of a court having unlimited jurisdiction in civil or criminal matters in a country in which the common law is Roman-Dutch or English, and English is an official language

== See also ==
- Linguistic rights
- List of Linguistic Rights in Constitutions (Europe)
- Organisation of African Unity
- African Charter on Human and Peoples' Rights
- African Academy of Languages
- African Union
- African Commission on Human and Peoples' Rights
- African Court on Human and Peoples' Rights
- History of Africa
- Freedom of speech by country
- Freedom of speech
