= List of linguistic rights in European constitutions =

Linguistic rights in Europe are stated in constitutions which differ by country. These constitutions usually state the national language or official language, and may or may not explicitly allow for other languages in the country. Most of the linguistic rights stated here are negative rights, which grant freedom of usage of own language and prevents discrimination based on language. Some countries do offer positive rights: for example provision of language education from State funds in Austria, Cyprus, Finland, Hungary, Moldova, Portugal, Romania, Turkey, and Ukraine.

== Linguistic rights in constitutions (Europe) ==
=== Albania ===
Constitution as adopted on 4 August 1998.

Article 14

(1) The official language in the Republic of Albania is Albanian.

Article 18

(2) No one may be unjustly discriminated against for reasons such as gender, race, religion, ethnicity, language, political, religious or philosophical beliefs, economic condition, education, social status, or ancestry.

Article 20

(1) Persons who belong to national minorities have the right to exercise in full equality before the law the human rights and freedoms.
(2) They have the right freely to express, preserve and develop their ethnic, cultural, religious and linguistic identity, to study and to be taught in their mother tongue, as well as unite in organizations and societies for the protection of their interests and identity.

Article 28

(1) Everyone whose liberty has been taken away has the right to be notified immediately, in a language that he understands, of the reasons for this measure, as well as the accusation made against him. Every person whose liberty has been taken away shall be informed that he has no obligation to make a declaration and has the right to communicate immediately with a lawyer, and he shall also be given the possibility to realize his rights.

Article 31

During a criminal proceeding, everyone has the right:

c) to have the assistance without payment of a translator, when he does not speak or understand the Albanian language;

=== Andorra ===
Constitution of Andorra as adopted on 28 April 1993.

Article 2

1. Catalan is the official language of the State.

=== Armenia ===
Constitution as adopted on 5 July 1995.

Article 12

The state language of the Republic of Armenia is Armenian.

Article 15

Citizens, regardless of national origin, race, sex, language, creed, political or other persuasion, social origin, wealth or other status, are entitled to all the rights and freedoms, and subject to the duties determined by the Constitution and the laws.

Article 37

Citizens belonging to national minorities are entitled to the preservation of their traditions and the development of their language and culture.

=== Austria ===
Constitution as adopted in 1929.

Article 8

Without prejudice to the rights provided by federal law for linguistic minorities, German is the official language of the Republic.

Article 14

(6) Public schools are those schools which are established and maintained by authorities so required by law. The Federation is the authority so required by law in so far as legislation and execution in matters of the establishment, maintenance, and dissolution of public schools are the business of the Federation. The State or, according to the statutory provisions, the County, or a County Association is the authority so required by law in so far as legislation or implementing legislation and execution in matters of establishment, maintenance and dissolution of public schools are the business of the State. Admission to public school is open to all without distinction of birth, sex race, status, class, language and religion, and in other respects within the limits of the statutory requirements. The same applies analogously to kindergartens, centers, and student hostels.

Austrian State Treaty, signed in 1955 and included in the Constitution

Article 7

(1) Austrian nationals of the Slovenian and Croatian minorities in Carinthia, Burgenland and Styria shall enjoy the same rights on equal terms as all other Austrian nationals, including the right to their own organisations, meetings and press in their own language.
(2) They are entitled to elementary instruction in the Slovenian or Croatian languages and to a proportional number of their own secondary schools; in this connection school curricula shall be reviewed and a section of the Inspectorate of Education shall be established for Slovenian and Croatian schools.
(3) In the administrative and judicial districts of Carinthia, Burgenland and Styria, where there are Slovenian, Croatian or mixed populations, the Slovenian or Croatian language shall be accepted as an official language in addition to German. In such districts topographical terminology and inscriptions shall be in the Slovenian or Croatian language as well as in German.
(4) Austrian nationals of the Slovenian and Croatian minorities in Carinthia, Burgenland and Styria shall participate in the cultural, administrative and judicial systems in these territories on equal terms with other Austrian nationals.
(5) The activity of organisations whose aim is to deprive the Croatian or Slovenian population of their minority character or rights shall be prohibited.

=== Azerbaijan ===
Constitution as of 12 November 1995.

Article 21

The Azerbaijan language shall be the State language of the Azerbaijan Republic. The Azerbaijan Republic shall ensure the development of the Azerbaijan language. The Azerbaijan Republic shall guarantee the free use and development of other languages spoken by the population.

Article 25

Every person shall be equal to the law and court.
Men and women shall have equal rights and freedoms.
Every person shall have equal rights and freedoms irrespective of race, nationality, religion, sex, origin, property status, social position, convictions, political party, trade union organization and social unity affiliation. Limitations or recognition of rights and freedoms because of race, nationality, social status, language origin, convictions and religion shall be prohibited.

Article 45

Every person shall have the right to use their mother tongue. Everyone shall have the right to be raised and get an education, be engaged in creative activities in the mother tongue.
No one can be deprived of the right to use their mother tongue.

=== Belarus ===
Constitution as adopted on 15 March 1994.

Article 17

1. The official language of the Republic of Belarus shall be Belarusian.
2. The Republic of Belarus shall safeguard the right to use the Russian language freely as a language of inter-ethnic communication.

Article 50

3. Everyone shall have the right to use his native language and to choose the language of communication. In accordance with law, the state shall guarantee the freedom to choose the language of education and teaching.

=== Belgium ===
Constitution of 7 February 1831, revised to 17 February 1994.

Article 2

Belgium is made up of three Communities: the French Community, the Flemish Community, and the German-speaking Community.

Article 4

(1) Belgium has four linguistic regions: the French-speaking Region, the Dutch-speaking Region, the bilingual Region of Brussels-Capital, and the German-speaking Region.
(2) Each commune of the Kingdom is part of one of these linguistic regions.
(3) The limits of the four linguistic regions can only be changed or modified by a law adopted by majority vote in each linguistic group in each House, on the condition that the majority of the members of each group are gathered together and from the moment that the total of affirmative votes given by the two linguistic groups is equal to at least two thirds of the votes expressed.

Article 43

(1) For cases determined by the Constitution, the elected members of each House are divided into a French linguistic group and a Dutch linguistic group, in the manner determined by law.
(2) The senators referred to in Article 67 (1)(2,4,7) make up the French linguistic group of the Senate. The senators referred to in Article 67 (1)(1,3,6), make up the Dutch linguistic group of the Senate.

Article 54

(1) With the exception of budgets and laws requiring a special majority, a justified motion, signed by at least three-quarters of the members of one of the linguistic groups and introduced following the introduction of the report and prior to the final vote in a public session, can declare that the provisions of a draft bill or of a motion are of a nature to gravely damage relations between the Communities.
(3) This procedure can only be applied once by the members of a linguistic group with regard to the same bill or motion.

Article 129

(1) The French and Dutch Community Councils rule by decree, in as much as each is concerned, excluding the federal legislator, on the use of language for:

1) administrative matters;
2) education in those establishments created, subsidized, and recognized by public authorities;
3) social relations between employers and their personnel, in addition to corporate acts and documents required by law and by regulations.

(2) These decrees have force of law in French-language and in Dutch-language regions respectively except as concerns:

- those communes or groups of communes contiguous to another linguistic Region and in which the law prescribes or allows use of another language than that of the Region in which they are located. For these communes, a modification of the rules governing the use of languages as described in (1) may take place only through a law adopted by majority vote as described in Article 4, last paragraph;
- services the activities of which extend beyond the linguistic Region within which they are established;
- federal and international institutions designated by law, the activities of which are common to more than one Community.

Article 136

(1) There are linguistic groups within the Brussels-Capital Regional Council, and among the governing bodies, qualified with respect to Community issues; their composition, functioning, and responsibilities and, without prejudice to Article 175, their financing, are regulated by a law adopted by majority vote as described in Article 4, last paragraph.

Article 138

(1) The French Community Council, on one hand, and the Walloon Regional Council and the French linguistic group of the Brussels-Capital Regional Council, on the other hand, may decide of common accord and each by decree, that the Walloon Regional Council and Government in the French-language Region, and the Brussels-Capital Regional Council and its governing bodies in the bilingual Region of Brussels-Capital may exercise, in full or in part, the responsibilities of the French Community.
(2) These decrees are adopted by a two-thirds majority vote within the French Community Council, and by absolute majority within the Walloon Regional Council and by the French linguistic group within the Brussels-Capital Regional Council, provided that a majority of the Council members or of the members of the linguistic group concerned are present. They may settle the financing of the responsibilities which they designate, in addition to transfers of personnel, of assets, of rights and of obligations which may concern them.

Article 139

(1) Upon request by their respective Governments, the German-speaking Community Council and the Walloon Regional Council may, by decree, decide of common accord that Walloon Regional responsibilities may be exercised in whole or in part by the German-speaking Community Council and Government in the German-language Region.

=== Bosnia and Herzegovina ===
Constitution as adopted on 1 December 1995.

Article I

(7) There shall be a citizenship of Bosnia and Herzegovina, to be regulated by the Parliamentary Assembly, and a citizenship of each Entity, to be regulated by each Entity, provided that:

(b) No person shall be deprived of Bosnia and Herzegovina or Entity citizenship arbitrarily or so as to leave him or her stateless. No person shall be deprived of Bosnia and Herzegovina or Entity citizenship on any ground such as sex, race, color, language, religion, political or other opinion, national or social origin, association with a national minority, property, birth or other status.

Article II

(4) The enjoyment of the rights and freedoms provided for in this Article or in the international agreements listed in Annex I to this Constitution shall be secured to all persons in Bosnia and Herzegovina without discrimination on any ground such as sex, race, color, language, religion, political or other opinion, national or social origin, association with a national minority, property, birth or other status.

=== Bulgaria ===
Constitution as adopted on 12 July 1991.

Article 3

Bulgarian is the official language of the Republic.

Article 36

1. Every citizen has the right and the obligation to study and use the Bulgarian language.
2. Citizens, for whom the Bulgarian language is not the mother tongue, will have the right to study and use their own language alongside the duty to study the Bulgarian language.
3. Cases where only the official language is to be used will be determined by law.

=== Croatia ===
Constitution as adopted on 22 December 1990.

Article 12

(1) The Croatian language and the Latin script shall be in official use in the Republic of Croatia.
(2) In individual local units another language and the Cyrillic or some other script may, along with the Croatian language and the Latin script, be introduced into official use under conditions specified by law.

Article 14

(1) Citizens of the Republic of Croatia shall enjoy all rights and freedoms, regardless of race, colour, sex, language, religion, political or other opinion, national or social origin, property, birth, education, social status or other properties.

Article 15

(1) Members of all nations and minorities shall have equal rights in the Republic of Croatia.
(2) Members of all nations and minorities shall be guaranteed freedom to express their nationality, freedom to use their language and script, and cultural autonomy.

Article 17

(1) During a state of war or an immediate danger to the independence and unity of the Republic, or in the event of some natural disaster, individual freedoms and rights guaranteed by the Constitution may be restricted. This shall be decided by the Croatian Sabor by a two-thirds majority of all representatives or, if Croatian Sabor is unable to meet, by the President of the Republic.
(2) The extent of such restrictions shall be adequate to the nature of the danger, and may not result in the inequality of citizens in respect of race, colour, sex, language, religion, national or social origin.

Article 24

(2) ... The arrested person shall be immediately informed in a way understandable to him of the reasons for arrest and of his rights determined by law.

=== Cyprus ===
Constitution as adopted on 6 August 1960.

Article 2

For the purposes of this Constitution:

1. the Greek Community comprises all citizens of the Republic who are of Greek origin and whose mother tongue is Greek or who share the Greek cultural traditions or who are members of the Greek Orthodox Church;
2. the Turkish Community comprises all citizens of the Republic who are of Turkish origin and whose mother tongue is Turkish or who share the Turkish cultural traditions or who are Moslems.

Article 3

1. The official languages of the Republic are Greek and Turkish.
2. Legislative, executive and administrative acts and documents shall be drawn up in both official languages and shall, where under the express provisions of this Constitution promulgation is required, be promulgated by publication in the official Gazette of the Republic in both official languages.
3. Administrative or other official documents addressed to a Greek or a Turk shall be drawn up in the Greek or the Turkish language respectively.
4. Judicial proceedings shall be conducted or made and judgements shall be drawn up in the Greek language if the parties are Greek, in the Turkish language if the parties are Turkish, and in both the Greek and the Turkish languages if the parties are Greek and Turkish. The official language or languages to be used for such purposes in all other cases shall be specified by the Rules of Court made by the High Court under Article 163.
5. Any text in the official Gazette of the Republic shall be published in both official languages in the same issue.
6.

(1) Any difference between the Greek and the Turkish texts of any legislative, executive or administrative act or document published in the official Gazette of the Republic, shall be resolved by a competent court.
(2) The prevailing text of any law or decision of a Communal Chamber published in the official Gazette of the Republic shall be that of the language of the Communal Chamber concerned.
(3) Where any difference arises between the Greek and the Turkish texts of an executive or administrative act or document which, though not published in the official Gazette of the Republic, has otherwise been published, a statement by the Minister or any other authority concerned as to which the text should prevail or which should be the correct text shall be final and conclusive.
(4) A competent court may grant such remedies as it may deem just in any case of a difference in the texts as aforesaid.

7. The official languages shall be used on coins, currency notes and stamps.
8. Every person shall have the right to address himself to the authorities of the Republic in either of the official languages.

Article 11

4. Every person shall be informed at the time of his arrest in a language which he understands of the reasons for his arrest and shall be allowed to have the services of a lawyer of his own choosing...
6. The judge before whom the person arrested is brought shall promptly proceed to inquire into the grounds of the arrest in a language understandable by the person arrested and shall, as soon as possible and in any event not later than three days from such appearance, either release the person arrested on such terms as he may deem fit or where the investigation into the commission of the offence for which he has been arrested has not been completed remand him in custody and may remand him in custody from time to time for a period not exceeding eight days at any one time;

Article 12

5. Every person charged with an offence has the following minimum rights:

(a) to be informed promptly and in a language which he understands and in detail of the nature and grounds of the charge preferred against him;...
(e) to have the free assistance of an interpreter if he cannot understand or speak the language used in court.

Article 28

2. Every person shall enjoy all the rights and liberties provided for in this Constitution without any direct or indirect discrimination against any person on the ground of his community, race, religion, language, sex, political or other convictions, national or social descent, birth, colour, wealth, social class, or on any ground whatsoever, unless there is express provision to the contrary in this Constitution.

Article 30

3. Every person has the right...

(e) to have free assistance of an interpreter if he cannot understand or speak the language used in court.

Article 171

1. In sound and vision broadcasting there shall be programmes both for the Greek and the Turkish Communities.
2. The time allotted to programmes for the Turkish Community in sound broadcasting shall be not less than seventy-five hours in a seven-day week, spread to all days of such week in daily normal periods of transmission:

• provided that if the total period of transmissions has to be reduced so that the time allotted to programmes for the Greek Community should fall below seventy-five hours in a seven-day week, then the time allotted to programmes for the Turkish Community in any such week should be reduced by the same number of hours as that by which the time allotted to programmes for the Greek Community is reduced below such hours;
• provided further that if the time allotted to programmes for the Greek Community is increased above one hundred and forty hours in a seven-day week, then the time allotted to programmes for the Turkish Community shall be increased in the ratio of three hours for the Turkish Community to every seven hours for the Greek Community.

3. In vision broadcasting there shall be allotted three transmission days to the programmes for the Turkish Community of every ten consecutive transmission days and the total time allotted to the programmes for the Turkish Community in such ten transmission days shall be in the ratio of three hours to seven hours allotted to programmes for the Greek Community in such ten transmission days.
4. All official broadcasts in sound and vision shall be made both in Greek and Turkish and shall not be taken into account for the purposes of calculating the time under this Article.

Article 180

1. The Greek and the Turkish texts of this Constitution shall both be originals and shall have the same authenticity and the same legal force.

Article 189

Notwithstanding anything in Article 3 contained, for a period of five years after the date of the coming into operation of this Constitution:

(a) All laws which under Article 188 will continue to be in force may continue to be in the English language.
(b) The English language may be used in any proceedings before any court of the Republic.

=== Czech Republic ===
Neither the Czech Constitution nor the Charter name any official language of the country. Administrative code and Rules of Court Procedure, however, specify Czech language as the language of procedure of public administration and courts respectively. Specific linguistic rights are included in the following Articles of the Charter:

Article 25

(1) Citizens who constitute national or ethnic minorities are guaranteed all-round development, in particular the right to develop, together with other members of the minority, their own culture, the right to disseminate and receive information in their native language, and the right to associate in national associations. Detailed provisions shall be set down by law.
(2) Citizens belonging to national and ethnic minority groups are also guaranteed, under the conditions set down by law:

a) the right to education in their own language,
b) the right to use their own language in their relations with officials,
c) the right to participate in the resolution of affairs that concern national and ethnic minorities.

Article 37

(...)
(4) Anyone who declares that she does not speak the language in which a proceeding is being conducted has the right to the services of an interpreter.

Special enactments deal with the aforementioned constitutional rights of minorities. Special treatment is afforded to Slovak language, which may be the language of administrative and other procedure according to a number of specific laws. According to the Act on Rights of Members of Minorities, citizens belonging to minorities, which traditionally and on long-term basis live within the territory of the Czech Republic, enjoy the right to use their language in communication with authorities and in front of the courts of law. Other than Slovak, the languages of officially recognized minorities in the Czech Republic are Bulgarian, Croatian, German, Greek, Hungarian, Polish, Romani, Russian, Rusyn, Serbian and Ukrainian. These are indirectly under constitutional protection of the Charter's Article 25 via the Act on Rights of Minorities and official Government recognition. Unlike in many other European countries, the minorities' linguistic rights are not regionally restricted and may be enjoyed within the territory of the whole country. Among minorities which are as of 2012 seeking the same status are Vietnamese and Belarusians.

=== Denmark ===
National or official languages: Danish, Standard German (regional), Faroese (regional), Greenlandic (regional)

=== Estonia ===
Constitution as adopted on 28 June 1992.

Article 6

The official language of Estonia shall be Estonian.

Article 12

(1) All persons shall be equal before the law. No person may be discriminated against on the basis of nationality, race, colour, gender, language, origin, religion, political or other beliefs, financial or social status, or other reasons.

Article 21

(1) Any person who is deprived of his or her liberty shall be informed promptly, in a language and manner which he or she understands, of the reason for the arrest, and of his or her rights, and shall be given the opportunity to notify his or her immediate family of the arrest...
(2) No person may be held in custody for more than 48 hours without specific permission by a court. Such a decision shall be promptly made known to the person in custody in a language and in a manner he or she understands.

Article 37

(4) All persons shall have the right to instruction in Estonian. Educational institutions established for ethnic minorities shall choose their own language of instruction.

Article 51

(1) All persons shall have the right to address state or local government authorities and their officials in Estonian, and to receive answers in Estonian.
(2) In localities where at least half of the permanent residents belong to an ethnic minority, all persons shall have the right to receive answers from state and local government authorities and their officials in the language of that ethnic minority.

Article 52

(1) The official language of state and local government authorities shall be Estonian.
(2) In localities where the language of the majority of the population is other than Estonian, local government authorities may use the language of the majority of the permanent residents of that locality for internal communication, to the extent and in accordance with procedures established by law.
(3) The use of foreign languages, including the languages of ethnic minorities, by state authorities and in court, and pre-trial proceedings shall be established by law.

=== Finland ===
Constitution as adopted on 17 July 1919.

Article 14

(1)Finnish and Swedish shall be the national languages of the Republic.
(2) The right of Finnish citizens to use their mother tongue, whether Finnish or Swedish, before the courts and the administrative authorities, and to obtain from them documents in these languages, shall be guaranteed by law; care shall be taken that the rights of the Finnish speaking population and the rights of the Swedish speaking population of the country shall be promoted by the state upon an identical basis.
(3) The state shall provide for the intellectual and economic needs of the Finnish speaking and the Swedish speaking populations upon a similar basis.

Article 22

Laws and decrees as well as bills submitted by the Government to Parliament and the replies, recommendations, and other documents addressed by Parliament to the Government shall be drawn up in the Finnish and the Swedish languages.

Article 50

(3) In redrawing the boundaries of the administrative districts, it is to be observed that these shall, as far as circumstances permit, be so constituted as to contain populations speaking only one language, Finnish or Swedish, or to make the language minorities as small as possible.

Article 75

(2) Every conscript, unless he otherwise desires, shall if possible be enrolled in a military unit of which the rank and file speak his own mother tongue (Finnish or Swedish) and shall receive his training in that language. Finnish shall be the language of command of the Armed Forces.

=== France ===
Constitution as adopted on 4 October 1958, and modified up to 25 June 1992.

Article 2

The language of the Republic shall be French.

=== Georgia ===
Constitution as adopted on 24 August 1995.

Article 8

The state language of Georgia is Georgian; in Abkhazia, Abkhazian is also the state language.

Article 14

Everyone is born free and is equal before the law, regardless of race, skin colour, language, sex, religion, political and other beliefs, national, ethnic and social origin, property and title of nobility or place of residence.

Article 38

1. Citizens of Georgia are equal in social, economic, cultural and political life regardless of national, ethnic, religious or language origin. According to universally recognised principles and norms of international law all have the right to develop their culture freely without any discrimination and interference. They may use their language in private and public life.

Article 85

2. Jurisdiction is exercised in the state language. Persons not having command of the legal language of the court are provided with interpreters. In the regions where the population does not have a command of the state language, the state provides teaching in the state language and explanations of matters pertaining to its jurisdiction.

=== Germany ===
Constitution as adopted on 23 May 1949 and amended up to 1995.

Article 3

3. No one may be prejudiced or favoured because of his sex, his parentage, his race, his language, his homeland and origin, his faith or his religious or political opinions.

=== Greece ===
Constitution as adopted on 11 June 1975.

Article 3

The text of the Holy Scripture shall be maintained unaltered. Official translation of the text into any other form of language, without prior sanction by the Autocephalous Church of Greece and the Great Church of Christ in Constantinople is prohibited.

Article 5

All persons living within the Greek territory shall enjoy full protection of their life, honour and freedom, irrespective of nationality, race or language and of religious or political beliefs. Exceptions shall be permitted only in cases provided for in international law.

=== Hungary ===
The Fundamental Law of Hungary adapted on 25 April 2011

Article H) (1) In Hungary the official language shall be Hungarian. (2) Hungary shall protect the Hungarian language. (3) Hungary shall protect the Hungarian Sign Language as a part of the Hungarian culture.

=== Iceland ===
Does not have constitutional provisions related to linguistic rights.

=== Ireland ===
Constitution as adopted on 1 July 1937.

Article 8

1. The Irish language as the national language is the first official language.
2. The English language is recognised as a second official language.
3. Provision may, however, be made by law for the exclusive use of either of the said languages for any one or more official purposes, either throughout the state or in any part thereof.

Article 18

7. Before each general election of the members of the Seanad Éireann to be elected from panels of candidates, five panels of candidates shall be formed in the manner provided by law containing respectively the names of persons having knowledge and practical experience of the following interests and services, namely:
(i) national language and culture, literature, art, education and such professional interests as may be defined by law for the purpose of this panel;

Article 25

4.

(3) Every bill shall be signed by the President in the text in which it was passed or deemed to have been passed by both Houses of the Oireachtas, and if a bill is so passed or deemed to have been passed in both the official languages, the President shall sign the text of the bill in each of those languages.
(4) Where the President signs the text of a bill in one only of the official languages, an official translation shall be issued in the other official language.
(5) As soon as may be after the signature and promulgation of a bill as a law, the text of such law which was signed by the President or, where the President has signed the text of such law in each of the official languages, both the signed texts shall be enrolled for record in the office of the Registrar of the Supreme Court and the text, or both texts, so enrolled shall be conclusive evidence of the provisions of such law.
(6) In case of conflict between the texts of a law enrolled under this section in both the official languages, the text in the national language shall prevail...

5.

(1) It shall be lawful for the Taoiseach, from time to time as occasion appears to him to require, to cause to be prepared under his supervision a text, in both official languages, of this Constitution as then in force embodying all amendments theretofore made therein...
(4) In case of conflict between the texts of any copy of this Constitution enrolled under this section, the text in the national language shall prevail.

=== Italy ===
Constitution as adopted on 22 December 1947.

Article 3

All citizens are invested with equal social status and are equal before the law, without distinction as to sex, race, language, religion, political opinions and personal or social conditions.

Article 6

The Republic shall safeguard linguistic minorities by means of special provisions.

=== Latvia ===
The Constitution of the Republic of Latvia was adopted by the Constitutional Assembly of Latvia on 15 February 1922 and it was last amended on 30 April 2002.

Article 4

The Latvian language is the official language in the Republic of Latvia.

Article 114

Persons belonging to ethnic minorities have the right to preserve and develop their language and their ethnic and cultural identity.

In addition the State Language Law provides further protection to Livonian language and Latgalian literary tradition and regards all other languages as a foreign. The law was adopted in December 1999 and entered into force on the 1st of September 2000.

=== Liechtenstein ===
Constitution as adopted on 6 October 1921.

Article 6

The German language is the national and official language.

=== Lithuania ===
Constitution as adopted on 25 October 1992.

Article 14

Lithuanian shall be the state language.

Article 29

(2) A person may not have his rights restricted in any way, or be granted any privileges, on the basis of his or her sex, race, nationality, language, origin, social status, religion, convictions, or opinions.

Article 37

Citizens who belong to ethnic communities shall have the right to foster their language, culture, and customs.

Article 117

(2) In the Republic of Lithuania court trials shall be conducted in the State language.
(3) Persons who do not speak Lithuanian shall be guaranteed the right to participate in investigation and court proceedings through an interpreter.

=== Luxembourg ===
Constitution as adopted on 17 October 1868.

Article 29

The law will determine the use of languages in administrative and judicial matters.

=== North Macedonia ===
Constitution as adopted on 17 November 1991.

Article 7

(1) The Macedonian language, written using its Cyrillic alphabet, is the official language in the Republic of Macedonia.
(2) In the units of local self-government where the majority of the inhabitants belong to a nationality, in addition to the Macedonian language and Cyrillic alphabet, their language and alphabet are also in official use, in a manner determined by law.
(3) the units of local self-government where there is a considerable number of inhabitants belonging to a nationality, their language and alphabet are also in official use, in addition to the Macedonian language and Cyrillic alphabet, under conditions and in a manner determined by law.

Article 48

(2) The Republic guarantees the protection of the ethnic, cultural, linguistic and religious identity of the nationalities.
(4) Members of the nationalities have the right to instruction in their language in primary and secondary education, as determined by law. In schools where education is carried out in the language of a nationality, the Macedonian language is also studied.

Article 54

(3) The restriction of freedoms and rights cannot discriminate on grounds of sex, race, color of skin, language, religion, national or social origin, property or social status.

=== Malta ===
Constitution as adopted in 1964.

Article 5

1. The national language of Malta is the Maltese language.
2. The Maltese and the English languages and such other languages as may be prescribed by Parliament, by a law passed by not less than two-thirds of all the members of the House of Representatives, shall be the official languages of Malta and the Administration may for all official purposes use any of such languages:

Provided that any person may address the Administration in any of the official languages and the reply of the Administration thereto shall be in such language.

3. The language of the courts shall be the Maltese language:

Provided that Parliament may make such provision for the use of the English language in such cases and under such conditions as it may prescribe.

4. The House of Representatives may, in regulating its own procedure, determine the language or languages that shall be used in parliamentary proceedings and records.

Article 35

2. Any person who is arrested or detained shall be informed, at the time of his arrest or detention, in a language that he understands, of the reasons for his arrest or detention:

Provided that if an interpreter is necessary and is not readily available or if it is otherwise impracticable to comply with the provisions of this subsection at the time of the person's arrest or detention, such provisions shall be complied with as soon as practicable.

Article 75

Save as otherwise provided by Parliament, every law shall be enacted in both the Maltese and English languages and, if there is any conflict between the Maltese and the English texts of any law, the Maltese text shall prevail.

=== Moldova ===
Constitution as adopted on 29 July 1994.

Article 10

(2) The State recognizes and guarantees all its citizens the right to preserve, develop and express their ethnic, cultural, linguistic and religious identity.

Article 13

(1) The national language of the Republic of Moldova is Romanian, and its writing is based on the Latin alphabet.
(2) The Moldovan State acknowledges and protects the right to preserve, develop and use the Russian language and other languages spoken within the national territory of the country.
(3) The State will encourage and promote studies of foreign languages enjoying widespread international usage.
(4) The use of languages in the territory of the Republic of Moldova will be established by organic law.

Article 16

(2) All citizens of the Republic of Moldova are equal before the law and the public authorities, without any discrimination as to race, nationality, ethnic origin, language, religion, sex, political choice, personal property or social origin.

Article 35

(2) The State will enforce under the law the right of each person to choose his/her language in which teaching will be effected.
(3) In all forms of educational institutions the study of the country's official language will be ensured.

Article 78

(2) Any citizen of the Republic of Moldova over 35 years of age that has been living in the country for at least 10 years and speaks the state language can run for the office of President of the Republic of Moldova. The appropriate organic law shall determine the manner of selecting the candidates aspiring to this office.

Article 118

(1) Legal cases will be heard in the Romanian language.
(2) Those persons who do not know or are unable to speak Romanian have the right to take knowledge of all documents and items on file and to talk to the court through an interpreter.
(3) In accordance with the law legal hearings may also be conducted in a language that is found to be acceptable by the majority of the persons participating in the hearing.

=== Monaco ===
Constitution as adopted on 24 December 1922.

Article 8

The French language is the official language of the state.

=== Montenegro ===
Montenegrin became the official language of Montenegro with the ratification of a new constitution on 22 October 2007 Next to it, Serbian, Bosnian, Albanian and Croatian are recognized in usage.

=== Netherlands ===
National or official languages: Dutch, Papiamento, Papiamentu, Achterhoeks, Drents, Western Frisian, Gronings, Limburgisch, Sinte Romani, Vlax Romani, Sallands, Stellingwerfs, Twents, Veluws, Western Yiddish.

=== Norway ===
Constitution as adopted on 17 May 1814.

Article 92

Only Norwegian citizens, men and women, who speak the language of the country, shall be appointed to official posts of the state,...

Article 110A

The state authorities have a duty to create conditions in order to make the Sami population able to secure and develop its language, culture and social life.

=== Poland ===
Constitution as adopted on 2 April 1997.

Article 27

Polish shall be the official language in the Republic of Poland. This provision shall not infringe upon national minority rights resulting from ratified international agreements

Article 35

(1) The Republic of Poland shall ensure Polish citizens belonging to national or ethnic minorities the freedom to maintain and develop their own language, to maintain customs and traditions, and to develop their own culture.
(2) National and ethnic minorities shall have the right to establish educational and cultural institutions, institutions designed to protect religious identity, as well as to participate in the resolution of matters connected with their cultural identity.

Article 233

(2) Limitation of the freedoms and rights of persons and citizens only by reason of race, gender, language, faith or lack of it, social origin, ancestry or property shall be prohibited.

=== Portugal ===
Constitution as adopted on 2 April 1976.

Article 9

The basic tasks of the State are:

f) To secure training on and constant valorization of the Portuguese language, to defend its use and promote its international circulation.

Article 13

(2) No one is privileged, favored, injured, deprived of any right, or exempt from any duty because of his ancestry, sex, race, language, territory of origin, religion, political or ideological convictions, education, economic situation, or social condition.

Article 74

(3) In the implementation of its educational policy it is a State duty to:

h) Secure for emigrants' children the teaching of the Portuguese language and access to Portuguese culture.

=== Romania ===
Constitution as adopted on 8 December 1991.

Article 4

2. Romania is the common and indivisible homeland of all its citizens, without any discrimination on account of race, nationality, ethnic origin, language, religion, sex, opinion, political adherence, property or social origin.

Article 6

1. The state recognises and guarantees the right of persons belonging to national minorities, to the preservation, development and expression of their ethnic, cultural, linguistic and religious identity.

Article 7

The state shall support the strengthening of links with the Romanians living abroad and shall act accordingly for the preservation, development and expression of their ethnic, cultural, linguistic and religious identity, under observance of the legislation of the state of which they are citizens.

Article 13

In Romania, the official language is Romanian.

Article 23

5. Any person detained or arrested shall be promptly informed, in a language he understands, of the grounds for his detention or arrest, and notified of the charges against him, as soon as practicable; the notification of the charges shall be made only in the presence of a lawyer of his own choosing or appointed ex officio.

Article 32

2. Education of all grades shall be in Romanian. Education may also be conducted in a foreign language of international use, under the terms laid down by law.
3. The right of persons belonging to national minorities to learn their mother tongue, and their right to be educated in this language are guaranteed; the ways to exercise these rights shall be regulated by law.

Article 127

1. Procedure shall be conducted in Romanian.
2. Citizens belonging to national minorities, as well as persons who cannot understand or speak Romanian have the right to take cognisance of all acts and files of the case, to speak before the Court and formulate conclusions, through an interpreter; in criminal trials, this right shall be ensured free of charge.

Article 148

1. The provisions of this Constitution with regard to the national, independent, unitary and indivisible character of the Romanian state, the Republican form of government, territorial integrity, independence of the judiciary, political pluralism and official language shall not be subject to revision.

=== Russia ===
Constitution as adopted on 12 December 1993.

Article 19

2. The state shall guarantee the equality of rights and liberties regardless of sex, race, nationality, language, origin, property or employment status, residence, attitude to religion, convictions, membership of public associations or any other circumstance. Any restrictions of the rights of citizens on social, racial, national, linguistic, or religious grounds shall be prohibited.

Article 26

2. Everyone shall have the right to use his native language and to freely choose the language of communication, education, training and creative work.

Article 29

2. Propaganda or inciting social, racial, national, or religious hatred and strife is impermissible. The propaganda of social, racial, national, religious, or linguistic supremacy is forbidden.

Article 68

1. The state language of the Russian Federation throughout its territory shall be the Russian language.
2. The republics shall have the right to institute their own state languages. They shall be used alongside the state language of the Russian Federation in bodies of state power, bodies of local self-government and state institutions of the republics.
3. The Russian Federation shall guarantee all its peoples the right to preserve their native language and to create the conditions for its study and development.

=== San Marino ===
Does not have constitutional provisions related to linguistic rights.

=== Serbia ===
The official and national language is Serbian.

=== Slovakia ===
Constitution as adopted on 3 September 1992.

Article 6

1. Slovak is the official language of the Slovak Republic.
2. The use of languages other than the official language in official communications shall be determined by law.

Article 12

2. Fundamental rights shall be guaranteed in the Slovak Republic to every person regardless of sex, race, colour, language, faith, religion, political affiliation or conviction, national or social origin, nationality or ethnic origin, property, birth or any other status, and no person shall be denied their legal rights, discriminated or favoured on any of these grounds.

Article 26

5. Government authorities and public administration shall be obligated to provide reasonable access to the information in the official language of their work. The terms and procedures of execution thereof shall be specified by law.

Article 34

1. Citizens of national minorities or ethnic groups in the Slovak Republic shall be guaranteed their full development, particularly the rights to promote their cultural heritage with other citizens of the same national minority or ethnic group, receive and disseminate information in their mother tongue, form associations, and create and maintain educational and cultural institutions. Details thereof will be determined by law.
2. In addition to the right to learn the official language, the citizens of national minorities or ethnic groups shall, under conditions defined by law, also be guaranteed:

(a) the right to be educated in a minority language,
(b) the right to use a minority language in official communications,
(c) the right to participate in decision-making in matters affecting the national minorities and ethnic groups.

Article 47

2. Every person shall have the right to counsel from the outset of proceedings before any court of law, or a governmental or public authority as provided by law...
4. A person who claims not to know the language used in the proceedings under section 2 of this Article shall have the right to an interpreter.

=== Slovenia ===
Constitution as adopted on 23 December 1991.

Article 11

The Slovene language shall be the official language in Slovenia. In the municipalities with Italian or Hungarian populations, the Italian or Hungarian language shall also be the official language.

Article 61

Everyone has the right to freely express his belonging to his nation or nationality, to develop and express his culture and to use his language and alphabet.

Article 62

Everyone has the right, in the exercise of the rights and duties as well as in proceedings before state organs and public authorities, to use his own language and alphabet, in the manner determined by law.

Article 64

The autochthonous Italian and Hungarian ethnic communities and their members are entitled freely to use their ethnic symbols in order to preserve their ethnic identity, they are entitled to establish organisations, develop economic, cultural, scientific and research activities, and activities in the fields of mass media and publishing. Further they are entitled, as determined by law, to education in their language or to bilingual education. Regions where bilingual schools are compulsory shall be determined by law. The two ethnic communities and their members are entitled to cultivate the relations with their two parent nations and their respective states. The state shall support the implementation of the aforementioned rights financially and morally.

=== Spain ===
Constitution as adopted on 29 December 1978.

Article 3

1. Castilian is the official Spanish language of the state. All Spaniards have the duty to know it and the right to use it.
2. The other languages of Spain will also be official in the respective autonomous communities, in accordance with their statutes.
3. The richness of the linguistic modalities of Spain is a cultural patrimony which will be the object of special respect and protection.

Article 20

3. The law shall regulate the organization and parliamentary control of the means of social communication owned by the State or any public entity and shall guarantee access to those means by significant social and political groups, respecting the pluralism of society and the various languages of Spain.

Article 148

1. The Autonomous Communities may assume jurisdiction in the following matters...

(17) assistance to culture, research and, as the case may be, for the teaching of the language of the Autonomous Community;

=== Sweden ===
Instrument of Government 1974, amended 2010.

Chapter 1

Article 2

(6) Opportunities should be promoted for the Sami people and ethnic, linguistic and religious minorities to preserve and develop their own cultural and social life.

=== Switzerland ===
National or official languages: French, Standard German, Italian, Romansch.

=== Turkey ===
Constitution of 1982 as amended 17 October 2001.

Article 3

The Turkish State, with its territory and nation, is an indivisible entity. Its language is Turkish.

Article 10

All individuals are equal without any discrimination before the law, irrespective of language, race, colour, sex, political opinion, philosophical belief, religion and sect, or any such considerations.

Article 42

...No language other than Turkish shall be taught as a mother tongue to Turkish citizens at any institutions of training or education. Foreign languages to be taught in institutions of training and education and the rules to be followed by schools conducting training and education in a foreign language shall be determined by law.

Article 134

The "Atatürk High Institution of Culture, Language and History" shall be established as a public corporate body, under the moral aegis of Atatürk, under the supervision of and with the support of the President of the Republic, attached to the Office of the Prime Minister, and composed of the Atatürk Centre of Research, the Turkish Language Society, the Turkish Historical Society and the Atatürk Cultural Centre, in order to conduct scientific research, to produce publications and to disseminate information on the thought, principles and reforms of Atatürk, Turkish culture, Turkish history and the Turkish language.
The financial income of the Turkish Language Society and Turkish Historical Society, bequeathed to them by Atatürk in his will are reserved and shall be allocated to them accordingly.
The establishment, organs, operating procedures and personnel matters of the Atatürk High Institution of Culture, Language and History, and its authority over the institutions within it, shall be regulated by law.

=== Ukraine ===
Constitution as adopted on 28 June 1996.

Article 10

The state language of Ukraine is the Ukrainian language.
The State ensures the comprehensive development and functioning of the Ukrainian language in all spheres of social life throughout the entire territory of Ukraine.
In Ukraine, the free development, use and protection of Russian, and other languages of national minorities of Ukraine, is guaranteed.
The State promotes the learning of languages of international communication.
The use of languages in Ukraine is guaranteed by the Constitution of Ukraine and is determined by law.

Article 53

Citizens who belong to national minorities are guaranteed in accordance with the law the right to receive instruction in their native language, or to study their native language in state and communal educational establishments and through national cultural societies.

Article 92

The following are determined exclusively by the laws of Ukraine:
(3) the rights of indigenous peoples and national minorities;
(4) the procedure for the use of languages;

Article 103

A citizen of Ukraine who has attained the age of thirty-five, has the right to vote, has resided in Ukraine for the past ten years prior to the day of elections, and has command of the state language, may be elected as the President of Ukraine.

Article 138

The competence of the Autonomous Republic of Crimea comprises:

(8) ensuring the operation and development of the state language and national languages and cultures in the Autonomous Republic of Crimea; protection and use of historical monuments;

Article 148

A citizen of Ukraine who has attained the age of forty on the day of appointment, has a higher legal education and professional experience of no less than ten years, has resided in Ukraine for the last twenty years, and has command of the state language, may be a judge of the Constitutional Court of Ukraine.

=== Vatican City ===
National or official language: Latin.

== See also ==
- Linguistic rights
- List of linguistic rights in African constitutions
- European Charter for Regional or Minority Languages
- Framework Convention for the Protection of National Minorities
- Council of Europe
- European Union
- European Council
- Council of the European Union
- European Court of Human Rights
- Human rights in Europe
- European Convention on Human Rights
- Freedom of speech by country
- Freedom of speech
