= African Academy of Languages =

Pan-African organization for the harmonization of Africa's languages

The African Academy of Languages (ACALAN; French: Académie Africaine des Langues; Portuguese: Academia Africana de Línguas or ACALIN) is a Pan-African organization founded in 2001 by Mali's then-president Alpha Oumar Konaré for the development and promotion of African languages. First established as the Mission for the African Academy of Languages (MACALAN). The first head of ACALAN was Mali's former minister of Basic Education Adama Samassekou. 2006 saw the African Union declare the Year of African Languages, along with the official establishment of the African Academy of Languages, with June 21 seeing the inauguration of the interim Governing Board of ACALAN in Addis Ababa, Ethiopia.

Since creation, the ACALAN has participated in a number of projects across Africa from the development of a linguistic atlas of Africa to the Harmonization and standardization of the writing systems of Vehicular Cross-border Languages such as Fulfulde, Hausa, and Mandenkan.

From December 2009 until August 2015, Prof. Sozinho Francisco Matsinhe of Mozambique led ACALAN. Dr. Lang Fafa Dampha succeeded him on an acting basis and then since January 2019 with full title.

== Organization ==
The ACALAN is divided into five main organs at the multinational level, they are:

1. The AU Conference of Ministers of Culture - supreme organ
2. The Governing Board - highest policy organ
3. The Scientific and Technical Committee - consultative organ
4. The Assembly of Academicians - advisory organ
5. The Executive Secretariat - administrative organ.

The ACALAN also exists with a nationally based National Language Structures (NLS) in each of the member states along with a Vehicular Cross-border Language Commission for each of its target languages.

== See also ==
- List of Linguistic Rights in Constitutions (Africa)
- Linguistic rights
- Language Regulators
