= Euromosaic =

The Euromosaic project is a study and survey of minority and regional languages in member states by the European Commission of the European Community (EC) and its successor, the European Union (EU). The study documented the linguistic diversity of the 12 original EC countries and later of its newer members who joined the EU.

The situation of linguistic minorities within the EC remained undocumented by the organisation, as over 10 million people spoke a first language other than the official recognised languages of member states. As the attention on economic and European integration evolved, language diversity became an area of focus with the aim of creating a new policy for European languages and cultures.

In 1992, the European Commission undertook two preliminary studies of the subject. Later, using those two bibliographical studies as a basis, the European Commission expanded the scope and 4 research centres became part of the project. They were the Center National de la Recherche Scientifique (Paris), the Centre de Recherche sur le Multilinguisme/Onderzoekscentrum Voor Meertaligheid (Brussels), the Institut de Sociolingüística Catalana (Barcelona) and the Research Centre of Wales (Bangor). These centres organised teams of researchers who did extensive fieldwork and gathered reliable data on the linguistic and socio–economic situation of communities with minority languages resulting in the production of multiple large reports.

A total of 90 minority languages have been examined between the 1990s–2000s. The results of the Euromosaic project described communities with minority languages were in areas usually sidelined socio-politically and economically by the state. The study reported economic progress and extensive state based assistance toward minority language communities was needed, otherwise without those factors a minority language could disappear. The interaction between a language group and the state affected the conditions for linguistic maintenance or disappearance and was dependant on elements such as legitimacy (legislation, social policy), legal status and institutionalisation. The role of demographic size also overall determined minority language retention with bigger groups more able than some smaller communities. Another factor was the involvement of a minority language in education and its effect on language prestige.

== See also ==
- European Bureau for Lesser-Used Languages
- European Charter for Regional or Minority Languages
- Framework Convention for the Protection of National Minorities
- Languages of the European Union
