= African Charter on Human and Peoples' Rights =

International human rights instrument

The African Charter on Human and Peoples' Rights (also known as the Banjul Charter) is an international human rights instrument that is intended to promote and protect human rights and basic freedoms in the African continent.

It emerged under the aegis of the Organisation of African Unity (since replaced by the African Union) which, at its 1979 Assembly of Heads of State and Government, adopted a resolution calling for the creation of a committee of experts to draft a continent-wide human rights instrument, similar to those that already existed in Europe (European Convention on Human Rights) and the Americas (American Convention on Human Rights). This committee was duly set up, and it produced a draft that was unanimously approved at the OAU's 18th Assembly held in June 1981, in Nairobi, Kenya. Pursuant to its Article 63 (whereby it was to "come into force three months after the reception by the Secretary General of the instruments of ratification or adherence of a simple majority" of the OAU's member states), the African Charter on Human and Peoples' Rights came into effect on 21 October 1986– in honour of which 21 October was declared "African Human Rights Day".

Oversight and interpretation of the Charter is the task of the African Commission on Human and Peoples' Rights, which was set up on November 2, 1987 in Addis Ababa (PM Ebbaa.A), Ethiopia and is now headquartered in Banjul, Gambia. A protocol to the Charter was subsequently adopted in 1998 whereby an African Court on Human and Peoples' Rights was to be created. The protocol came into effect on 25 January 2004.

In July 2004, the AU Assembly decided that the ACHP would be incorporated into the African Court of Justice. In July 2005, the AU Assembly then decided that the ACHP should be operationalised despite the fact that the protocol establishing the African Court of Justice had not yet come into effect. Accordingly, the Eighth Ordinary Session of the Executive Council of the African Union meeting in Khartoum, Sudan, on 22 January 2006, elected the first judges of the African Court on Human and Peoples' Rights. The relationship between the newly created Court and the commission is yet to be determined.

As of 2019, 53 states have ratified the Charter.

== Content ==
The African Charter on Human and People's Rights includes preamble, 3 parts, 4 chapters, and 63 articles. The Charter established a regional human rights system for Africa. The Charter shares many features with other regional instruments, but also has notable unique characteristics concerning the norms it recognizes and also its supervisory mechanism.

The preamble commits to the elimination of Zionism, which it compares with colonialism and apartheid, causing South Africa to qualify its 1996 accession with the reservation that the Charter fall in line with the UN's resolutions "regarding the characterization of Zionism."

== Norms contained in the Charter ==
=== Civil and political rights ===
The Charter recognizes most of what are regarded universally accepted civil and political rights. The civil and political rights recognized in the Charter include the right to freedom from discrimination (Article 2 and 18(3)), equality (Article 3), life and personal integrity (Article 4), dignity (Article 5), freedom from slavery (Article 5), freedom from cruel, inhuman or degrading treatment or punishment (Article 5), rights to due process concerning arrest and detention (Article 6), the right to a fair trial (Article 7 and 25), freedom of religion (Article 8), freedom of information and expression (Article 9), freedom of association (Article 10), freedom of assembly (Article 11), freedom of movement (Article 12), freedom to political participation (Article 13), the right to property (Article 14), and the right to resist (Article 20).

Some human rights scholars however consider the Charter's coverage of other civil and political rights to be inadequate. For example, the right to privacy or a right against forced or compulsory labour are not explicitly recognised. The provisions concerning fair trial and political participation are considered incomplete by international standards.

=== Economic, social and cultural rights ===
The Charter also recognises certain economic, social and cultural rights, and overall the Charter is considered to place considerable emphasis on these rights. The Charter recognises right to work (Article 15), the right to health (Article 16), and the right to education (Article 17). Through a decision by the African Commission on Human and Peoples' Rights, SERAC v Nigeria (2001), the Charter is also understood to include a right to housing and a right to food as "implicit" in the Charter, particularly in light of its provisions on the right to life (Art. 4), right to health (Art. 16) and to development (Art. 22).

=== Peoples' rights and group rights ===
In addition to recognising the individual rights mentioned above the Charter also recognises collective or group rights, or peoples' rights and third-generation human rights. As such the Charter recognises group rights to a degree not matched by the European or Inter-American regional human rights instruments. The Charter awards the family protection by the state (Article 18), while "peoples" have the right to equality (Article 19), the right to self-determination (Article 20), to freely dispose of their wealth and natural resources (Article 21), the right to development (Article 22), the right to peace and security (Article 23) and "a generally satisfactory environment" (Article 24).

=== Duties ===
The Charter not only awards rights to individuals and peoples, but also includes duties incumbent upon them. These duties are contained in Article 29 and are as follows:

- The duty to preserve the harmonious development of the family.
- To serve the national community by placing both physical and intellectual abilities at its service.
- Not to compromise the security of the State.
- To preserve and strengthen social and national solidarity.
- To preserve and strengthen national independence and the territorial integrity of one's country and to contribute to its defence.
- To work to the best of one's abilities and competence and to pay taxes in the interest of society.
- To preserve and strengthen positive African cultural values and in general to contribute to the promotion of the moral well-being of society.
- To contribute to the best of one's abilities to the promotion and achievement of African unity.

== See also ==
- African Charter on the Rights and Welfare of the Child
- African Court on Human and Peoples' Rights
- African Union
- International human rights law
- Maputo Protocol
- List of Linguistic Rights in Constitutions (Africa)
- Linguistic rights
- United Nations General Assembly Resolution 3379
