= Framework Convention for the Protection of National Minorities =

Treaty of the Council of Europe

- Signatories which have ratified Signatories which have not ratified Non-signatory members of the Council of Europe Non-members of the Council of Europe
- Effective: 1 February 1998; 27 years ago
- Condition: Ratification, acceptance or approval by 12 member states
- Parties: 38
- Depositary: Secretary General of the Council of Europe
- Languages: English; French

Full text
- Framework Convention for the Protection of National Minorities at Wikisource

The Framework Convention for the Protection of National Minorities (FCNM) is a multilateral treaty of the Council of Europe aimed at protecting the rights of minorities. It came into effect in 1998 and by 2009 it had been ratified by 39 member states.

== History ==
The Council of Europe first discussed according specific protection for national minorities in 1949, but it was not until 1990 that the Council of Europe made a firm commitment to protect these minority groups. Recommendation 1134 (1990) contained a list of principles which the Assembly considered necessary for this purpose. The Parliamentary Assembly did in the beginning call for adoption of a protocol to the ECHR. The Framework was signed in February 1995 by 22 member States of the Council of Europe and became active in 1998. By September 2024, 38 states have ratified the treaty and another 4 have signed it. Russia left the treaty in 2024.

== Aims, operation, and criticism ==
The broad aims of the convention are to ensure that the signatory states respect the rights of national minorities, undertaking to combat discrimination, promote equality, preserve and develop the culture and identity of national minorities, guarantee certain freedoms in relation to access to the media, minority languages and education and encourage the participation of national minorities in public life. Article 25 of the Framework Convention binds the member states to submit a report to the Council of Europe containing "full information on the legislative and other measures taken to give effect to the principles set out in this framework Convention" (Council of Europe, 1994, 7).

The convention operates in part through an Advisory Committee on the Framework Convention for the Protection of National Minorities, which "[evaluates] the implementation of the Framework Convention in state parties and [advises] the Committee of Ministers". The Advisory Committee consists of 18 experts on national minority protection. The current president of the Advisory Committee is Petra Roter from Slovenia. The Advisory Committee evaluates state adherence to the Framework Convention via "detailed country-specific opinions adopted following a monitoring procedure." The Advisory Committee publishes meeting and activity reports on its work.

The convention has come under some criticism. First of all, not all member states of the Council of Europe have signed and ratified it. France and Turkey have done neither. Iceland, Belgium, Luxembourg and Greece have signed and have yet to ratify. Also, the provisions offer little new on already existing international treaties. Furthermore, they are hedged around with many phrases including "as far as possible" (Art 10.2). The convention does not define "national minority" and several countries set their own definition of the term when they ratified the treaty. For example, the United Kingdom ratified the convention on the understanding that it would be applied with reference to "racial groups" within the meaning of Section 3(1) of the Race Relations Act 1976. Since this excluded the Cornish people, this resulted in pressure, including from Cornwall Council, for the UK Government to recognise the Cornish as a national minority. In April 2014, it was announced by the Chief Secretary to the Treasury, Danny Alexander, that the UK Government would recognise the Cornish as a national minority under the FCNM.

Overall however, Phillips (2002) [?] has argued that because the FCNM is flexible it has allowed such a great number of states to ratify it so quickly. Therefore, it should not be considered a failure, but a start. Many authors agree with this arguing that it needs to be implemented in 'good faith' with the political will to support commitment to minority rights.

== See also ==
- Euromosaic
- European Charter for Regional or Minority Languages
- Languages of the European Union
- Sub-Commission on Prevention of Discrimination and Protection of Minorities
- List of Linguistic Rights in Constitutions (Europe)
- Stateless nation
- International human rights instruments
