= European Centre for Minority Issues =

The European Centre for Minority Issues (ECMI) is an academic research institute based in Flensburg, Germany, that conducts research into minority issues, ethnopolitics, and minority-majority relations in Europe. ECMI is a non-partisan and interdisciplinary research institution. It is a non-profit, independent foundation, registered according to German Civil Law.

ECMI Logo

== History and Governance ==
ECMI was established in 1996 by the governments of Denmark, Germany, and Schleswig-Holstein. The centre, located in the historical Kompagnietor in Flensburg, is governed by a board composed of nine members: three from Denmark, three from Germany, one representative from the Organization for Security and Co-operation in Europe, one from the Council of Europe and one from the European Union. The institute's first director was Stefan Troebst, now professor of East European cultural studies at the University of Leipzig. His successor professor Marc Weller led the centre from 1999 until 2009. Tove Malloy was then the director until 2019 and since March 2020, the political scientist Vello Pettai is the Director of the ECMI .

== Research ==
The centre is organized into 6 research clusters (Conflict and Security, Culture and Diversity, Danish-German Minority Issues, Equality and Inclusion, Justice and Governance, Politics and Civil Society). The Danish-German cluster was the most recently added and provides a renewed focus on the border region and its minorities. As of 2025, the Centre lists 15 researchers on its website; 7 senior researchers, 2 postdoctoral researchers and 6 researchers.

The ECMI carries out interdisciplinary research, provides information and documentation, and offers advice on minority issues in the European context. It collaborates with various governments, international organizations, and associations, including the OSCE and the EU. A major focus of the Centre's activities is the monitoring and analysis of potential ethnic conflicts and anti-minority violence in Europe. The ECMI has three core tasks:

1. Assessment and further development of universal, regional, bilateral, and national standards
2. Implementation of such standards and evaluation of the effectiveness of implementation mechanisms
3. Constructive conflict management

The Centre employs a core staff and also hosts visiting fellows and visiting research associates. The Centre organizes its activities around three principal themes. It is concerned with the evaluation and further development of universal, regional, bilateral and national standards that may assist in consolidating democratic governance on the basis of ethnic diversity and human rights. In this context, ECMI is also particularly interested in the emerging convergence of standards between EU members and applicant states. A second area of involvement relates to implementation procedures and mechanisms for these diverse standards and the study of their effectiveness. At times, ECMI has been invited to consider standards implementation and majority-minority relations in particular states in cooperation with the government of that state and local groups. This has included cooperation with the Council of Europe, for example producing reports on promoting ratification of the European Charter for Regional or Minority Languages.

== Publications ==
Over the years, the European Centre for Minority Issues has produced a number of peer-reviewed journal articles, monographs, reports, working papers and issue briefs, as well as the peer-reviewed online open access journal, Journal on Ethnopolitics and Minority Issues in Europe (JEMIE), in addition to co-editorship (with EURAC Bozen) of the flagship publication European Yearbook of Minority Issues. The goal of this publication effort is to increase the awareness and dissemination of topics on minority issues, as well as to encourage further research in this field. Since 2019, the centre has published a scientific blog, the ECMI Minorities Blog, currently edited by Sergiusz Bober and Felix Schulte.

== Events ==
Since 2011, the ECMI has organised an annual summer school on national minorities, moving location each year. Recent editions have taken place in Brussels (2018), Berlin (2019), Flensburg (2020 and 2021), the Basque Country (2022), Belgrade (2023), Bratislava (2024), Tallinn (2025) and Flensburg (2026). Many editions of the summer school have been co-organised and co-financed with the Coppieters Foundation.

The centre also organises academic workshops and conferences in Flensburg and further afield. In 2011 it was one of the organising hosts of the 13th edition of the International Conference on Minority Languages which was held between Flensburg and Sonderburg.

== See also ==
- Council of Europe
- Federal Union of European Nationalities
- Minority Rights Group International
- OSCE High Commissioner on National Minorities
