= Anna Catharina Bischoff =

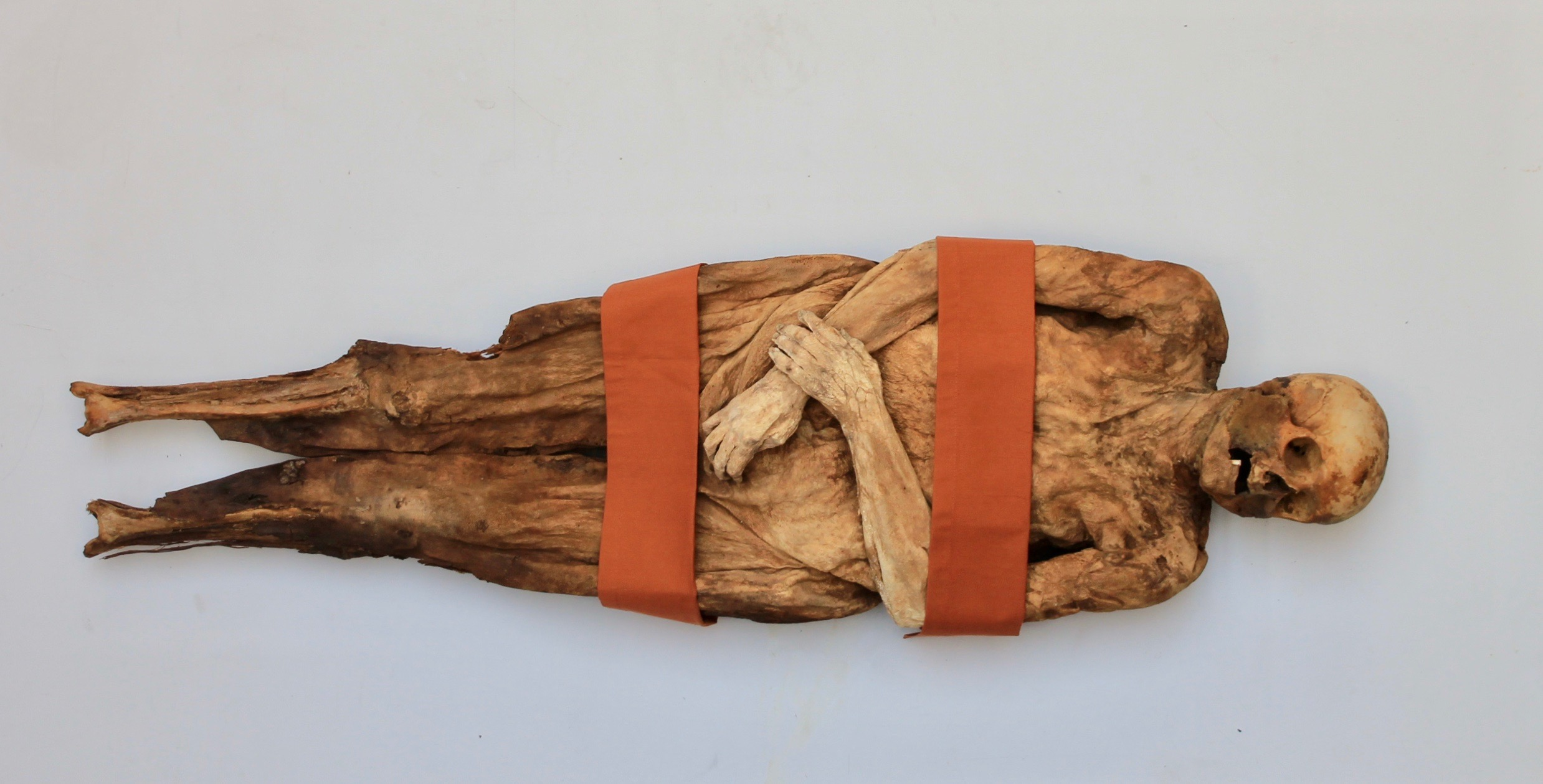
Mummy of Anna Catharina Bischoff

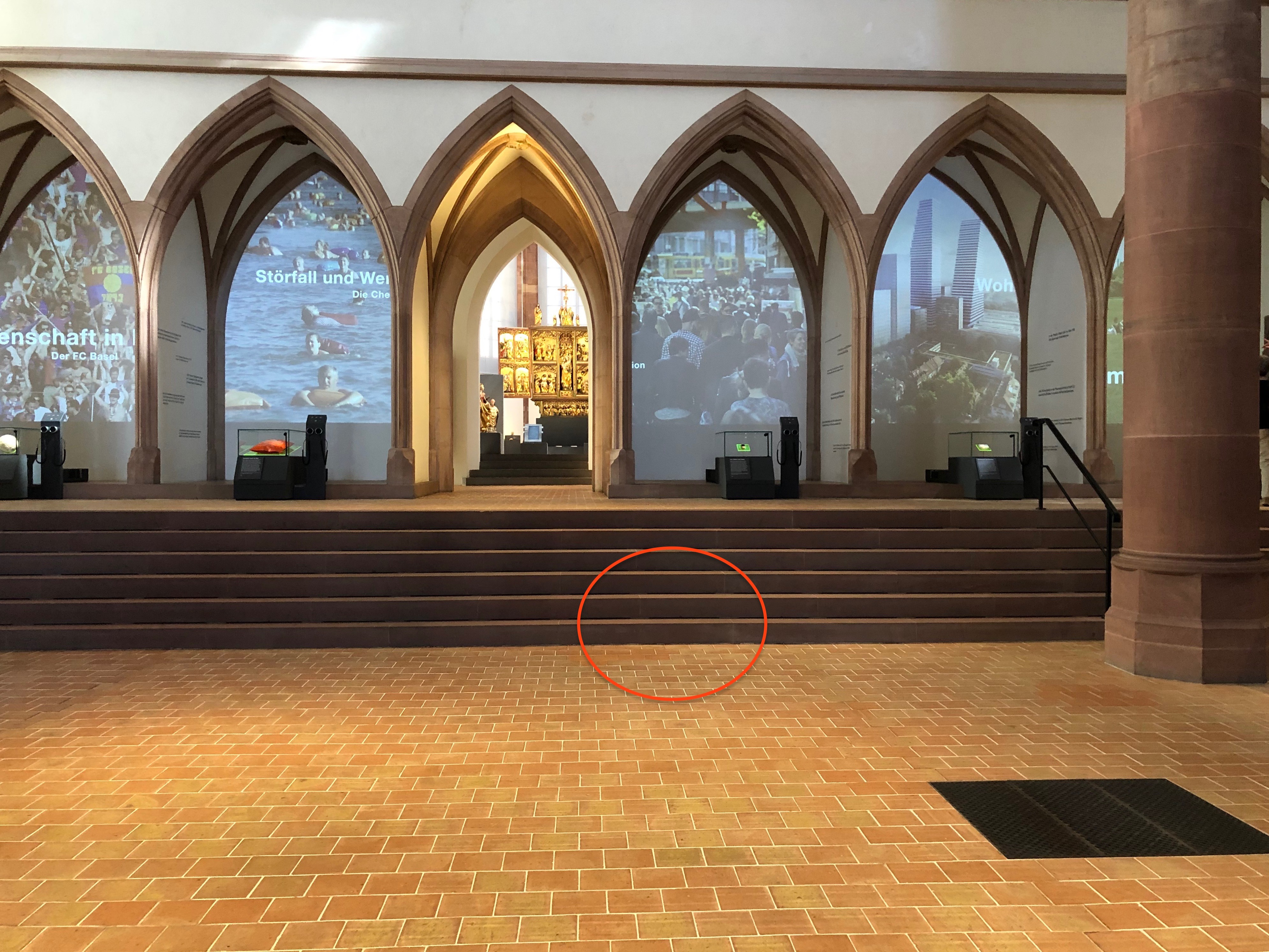
Where the coffin was found

Anna Catharina Bischoff (23 March 1719 – 30 August 1787), also known as the "Lady (or mummy) of the Barfüsser Church" was the wife of the pastor Lucas Gernler. She gained popularity in 1975, when her mummified corpse was found in a shaft at the Barfüsser Church in Basel in Switzerland.

== History ==
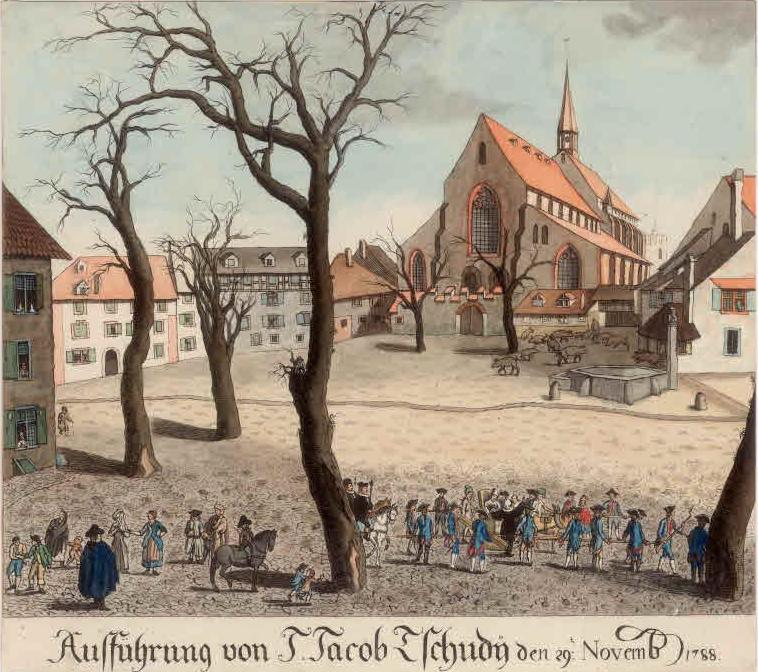
Barfüsserplatz 1788

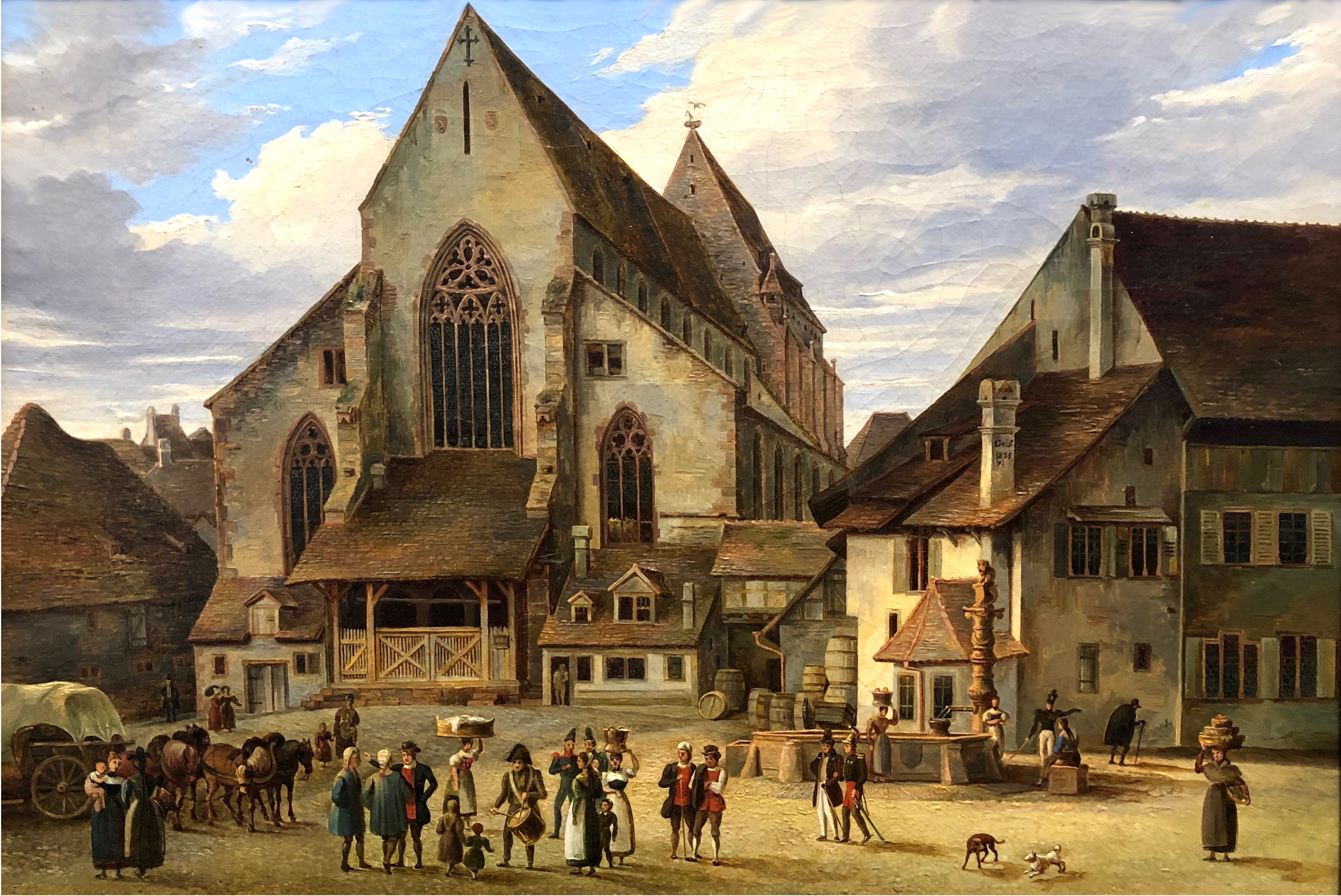
Around 1835, when the church was used as a warehouse

In 1975, the Barfüsser Church underwent a thorough renovation, during which the archaeological department of the city of Basel excavated and documented hundreds of burial sites.

== Discovery ==
On 20 October 1975, workers discovered a brick-walled grave chamber in front of the choir, containing two well-preserved coffins sitting on a pile of bones. The upper coffin contained the skeleton of a female while the smaller coffin beneath contained the completely mummified corpse of a woman, who would later be known as the "Lady/Mummy of the Barfüsser Church."

== First examinations ==
The woman was buried in a simple spruce wood coffin, her left hand holding her right arm above the wrist. The mummy was mostly intact: only the head and feet had decomposed while parts of her dress and hair were conserved. Her height was 142 cm. Skinfolds point at a stout body.

A first examination in 1976 by anthropologist Bruno Kaufmann revealed that Mercury sulfide (found in the whole body, especially in the lungs), prevented decay and was responsible for the mummification. Atmospheric conditions within the coffin and grave chamber also prevented microbes from breaking down the corpse.

== Recent research ==
Since 2015, the mummy has been investigated using modern methods at the Natural History Museum of Basel. Computer tomography revealed atherosclerosis of the abdominal aorta and gallstones, pointing at a diet consisting mainly of carbohydrates and fatty meat. During her lifetime, the woman had lost all the teeth in her upper jaw due to a sugary diet and oral hygiene neglect; her lower incisors and canines, although decayed, were preserved.

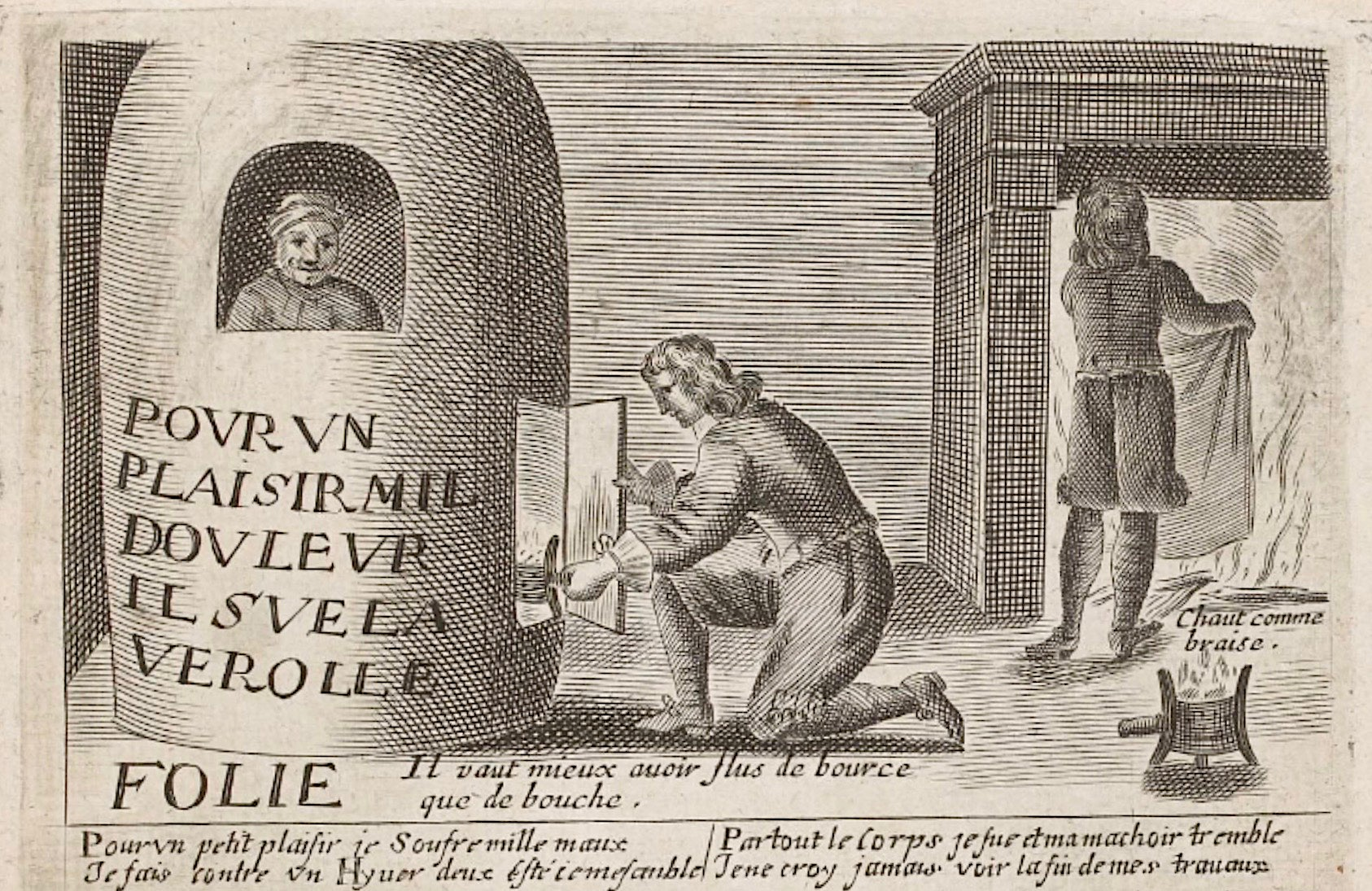
Treatment with mercury vapour. In a small chamber, mercury vapour was inhaled. Illustration of the 17th century

The detection of Mercury in the lungs and other organs of Anna Catharina Bischoff led the medical historians of the 1970s to the conclusion that the woman had undergone a mercury inhalation therapy. In those days, it was the usual method of treatment, which, however, was only administered to patients with severe cases of syphilis.

Modern analytical methods for measuring the level of mercury exposure indicate that the amount administered was below the threshold to have caused mercury poisoning. Mercury was indeed found in the body of Anna Catharina Bischoff, but with the data available at present, it is not possible to ascertain whether this had actually led to her death. Thus, the cause of her death cannot be proven beyond doubt. Further investigation is necessary to indicate whether this was caused by the syphilis or a combination of syphilis and mercury exposure.

== Identification ==
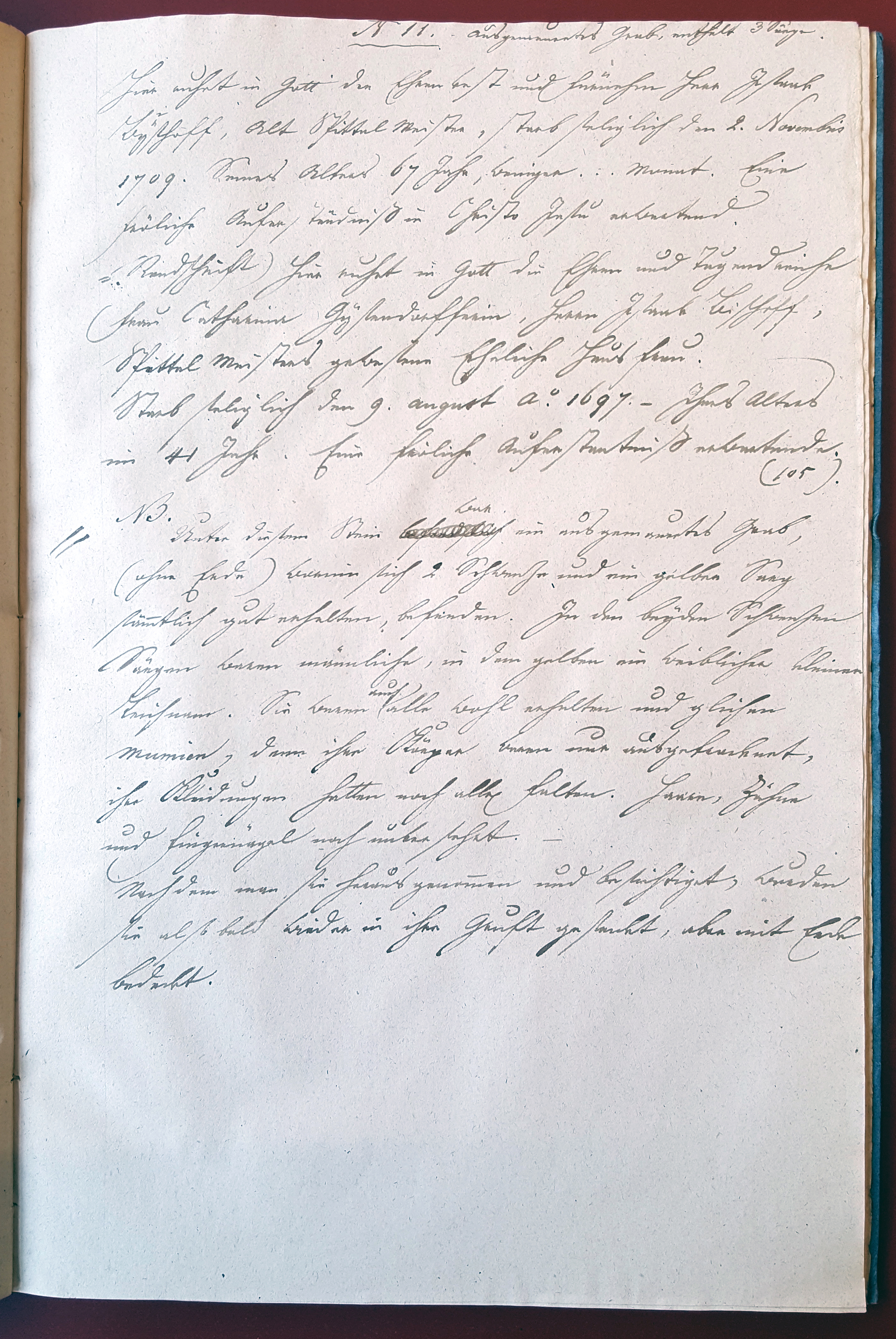
File note by contractor Blendinger

According to the prominent position of her grave, it can be deduced that the deceased was a member of a privileged class—the location was reserved for members of the high clergy or dignitaries.

Church archive documents show that the shaft in front of the choir had been opened once before 1843 when the nave of the church was transformed into a commercial warehouse. When the workers lifted the memorial slab labeled number 11, they discovered a grave underneath with three coffins. In 2016, Marie-Louise Gamma and Diana Gysin, members of Basel's citizen-researchers who discover and transcribe historic sources, discovered the relevant text in contractor Blendinger's notes, describing the text on the memorial slab as follows (in the original in German):

Memorial slab no. 11, walled grave, contains 3 coffins. Here rests with God the noble and honorable Isaak Byschoff, former Hospital Master, died peacefully on 2 November 1709. At the age of 67 years minus ... months. Awaiting his Blissful resurrection in Jesus Christ. Here rests with God the honorable and virtuous Catharina Gyssendorfferin, housemistress, wife of Isaak Byschoff, the former Hospital Master. Died blissfully on 9 August ao 1697, aged 41 years. Awaiting blissful resurrection. (105)

The number 105 references the memorial slab register of the Barfüsser Church of 1771, containing 110 family gravesites and information about the buried. It is kept in the State Archive of Basel City as StABS Bauakten JJ 32 bis 33’. In position 105 for the gravesite of the Hospital Master Bischoff, it is noted that his granddaughter Anna Catharina Bischoff was buried in August 1787.

Moreover, Blendinger noted:

N.b. Under this slab there was a walled grave (without soil), wherein 2 black and one yellow coffins, all well-preserved, were located. In the two black coffins were male, in the yellow one a small female corpse. They were all well preserved and resembled mummies, for their bodies were dried out only, their clothes still pleated; hair, teeth and fingernails still intact. Once they were taken out and inspected, they were buried again in the crypt, but covered with soil.

Thus for the first time there was a name for the mummy. Blendinger's description of the "small female corpse" coincides with the mummy of Anna Catharina Bischoff exhumed in 1975 for the second time.

== Genealogy ==
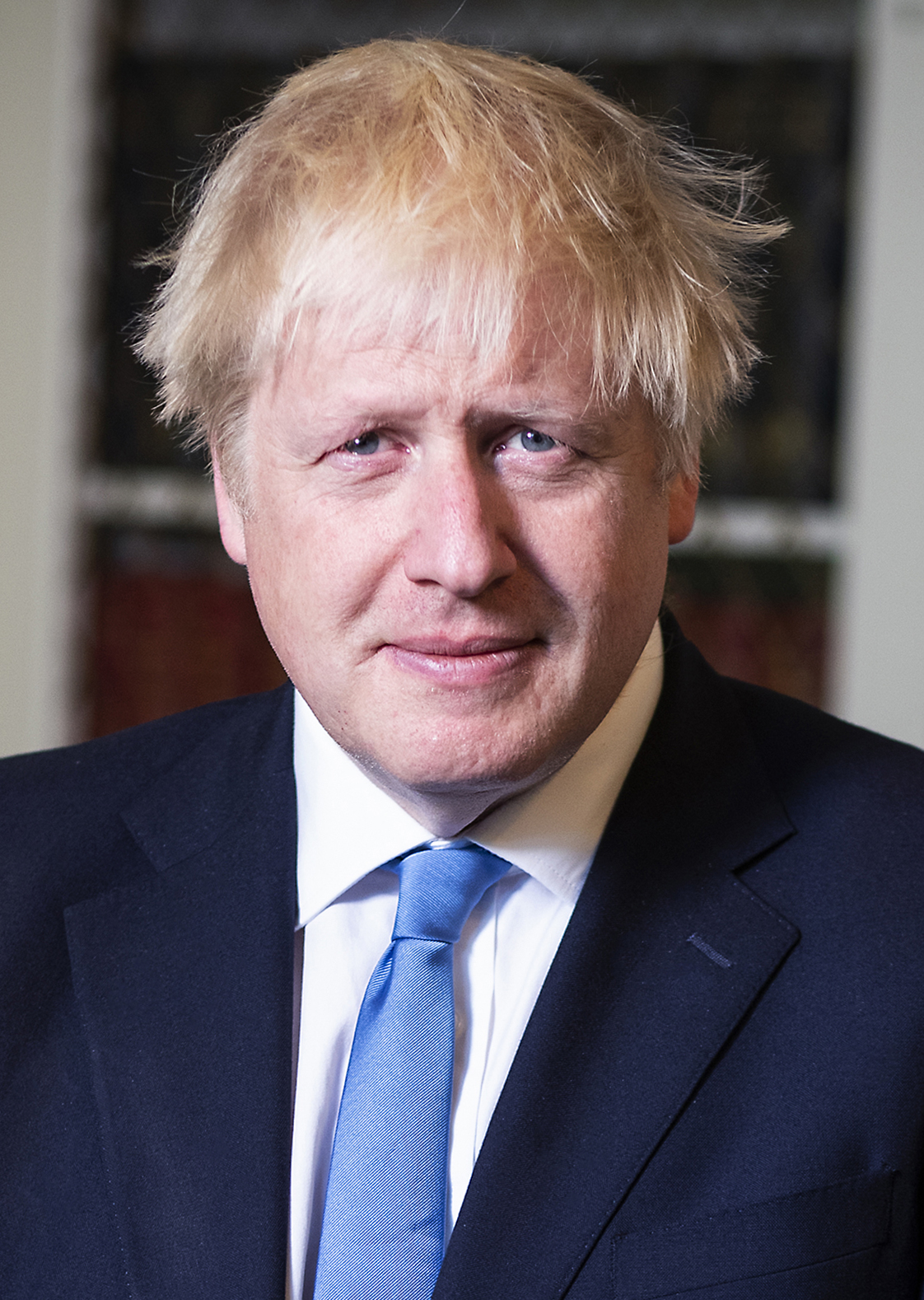
A descendant of the Barfüsser Church lady: the former Prime Minister of the United Kingdom and former Mayor of London Boris Johnson

A research team of the Institute of Mummy Research of Eurac Research in Bozen succeeded in isolating the mitochondrial DNA of the mummy and identifying a variant of the haplogroup U, providing the basis for scientific identification. Female descendants of the mummy needed to be found to compare their saliva with the mummy's DNA. The team of genealogists of Basel's citizen-researchers undertook this painstaking task and drew a family tree of the female line with information drawn from church and marriage records and internet groups. (A further project of the Citizen Science was, for example, the research on Theo the Pipe Smoker.)

Justina Froben, born 1512, was identified as Anna Catharina Bischoff's oldest ancestor, seven generations back: the daughter of the printer Johann Froben in Basel. From her, Marie-Louise Gamma and Diana Gysin were able to reconstruct an uninterrupted female line over 15 generations, from the beginning of the 16th century to Rosemary Probst-Ryhiner in the present. Among Justina Froben's matrilineal descendants was also the theatre pioneer Abel Seyler. A second line was identified in the US, to where one of Anna Catharina Bischoff's descendants had emigrated in the 19th century. DNA samples of both families were analysed, both revealing a coincidence with the mummy's DNA of over 99.8%. It was thereby proven that Anna Catharina Bischoff, born on 23 March 1719 in Strasbourg, was buried on 30 August 1787 in Basel.

A direct connection through Anna Catharina Bischoff's son-in-law Christian Friedrich Pfeffel von Kriegelstein leads to the British politician Boris Johnson; his great-grandmother was Marie Luise von Pfeffel. A World News BBC team travelled to the media event in Basel's Natural History Museum in January 2018 to report on the forebear of the prominent politician.

Relationship with Boris Johnson
wedding	⚭ 1738	⚭ 1759	⚭ 1808	⚭ 1836	⚭ um 1800	⚭ 1906	⚭1936	⚭ 1963	
f	Anna Catharina Bischoff; 1719–1787	Anna Katharina Gernler; 1739–1776	Carolina von Tettenborn; 1789–1811	Karoline von Rothenburg; 1805–1872	Hélène Arnous de Rivière; 1862–1951	Marie Louise von Pfeffel; 1882–1944	Yvonne Eileen Williams; 1907–1987	Charlotte Fawcett; 1942-2021	
m	Lucas Gernler; 1704–1781	Christian Friedrich Pfeffel von Kriegelstein; 1726–1807	Christian von Pfeffel; 1765–1834	Karl Max von Pfeffel; 1811–1890	Hubert von Pfeffel; 1843–1922	Stanley Fred Williams; 1880–1955	Osman Johnson Kemal; 1909–1992	Stanley Johnson * 1940	Boris Johnson * 1964

== Life ==
Anna Catharina Bischoff, granddaughter to Hospital Master Isaak Bischoff, stemmed from an old Basel lineage. She was born on 23 March 1719 as the oldest of five siblings, of which only her younger sister Anna Margaretha survived past childhood. Her parents were the reformed pastor Johann Jakob Bischoff (1683–1733) and Augusta Margaretha Burckhardt (1697–1735). The family was well-off and lived in the centre of Strasbourg in a ten-room, two-story house with a maid.

Her father died in 1733 aged 49, when Anna Catharina was 14. The same year, the widow Augusta Margaretha Burckhardt returned with her two young daughters to Basel, her city of origin. Just before the move, Anna Catharina met her future husband, Lucas Gernler (1704–1781), 15 years her senior. In 1732/33 he acted as a substitute for her father in Wolfisheim, where services were held. Later, he would be his successor.

After their wedding in 1738 in Basel, the couple returned to Strasbourg, where Anna Catherina gave birth to seven children, of which only two daughters survived past childhood. Augusta remained single and the other, Anna Katharina Gernler (1739–1776), married the German historian and diplomat Christian Friedrich Pfeffel von Kriegelstein. She died in Versailles in 1776 aged 37.

In 1781, Lucas Gernler died from a stroke aged 77, leaving behind countless letters and a church hymnal; a year later, Anna Catharina, then 62, moved to Basel. Until her death she likely lived with her younger sister Anna Margareta Geymüller-Bischoff (1724–1804), who had married a wealthy trader.

Anna Catharina's great-grandson Karl Maximilian von Pfeffel (1811–1890) later married the illegitimate daughter of Prince Paul of Württemberg, Karoline von Rothenburg. The couple are the great-great-grandparents of Boris Johnson, who thereby is a descendant of the lady of the Barfüsser Church in the seventh generation.

== Open questions ==
A team of 40 from the fields of anthropology, genealogy, forensic medicine, molecular biology, history of medicine and toxicology conducted the research underpinning the identification of the dead woman. Despite these comprehensive inquiries, several questions remain open, such as:

- What is the significance of the striking position of the hands?
- What happened to the two mummies of males mentioned 1843 by Blendinger?
- What is the origin of the skeleton found in 1975 in the upper coffin? The skull belongs to a roughly 25-year-old man, the rest of the skeleton to a roughly 40-year-old woman. It could be the remains of Catharina's grandmother Catharina Gysendörffer, buried in 1697 aged 41. The identity of the male, to whom the skull belonged, has not been ascertained.
- Was there a correspondence between Anna Catharina Bischoff and her daughter Katharina Gernler (1739-1776)? If yes, in which archive could the letters been found?
- Is there a portrait of Anna Catharina Bischoff and her husband Lucas Gernler?

The team keeps researching with the objective to answer the open questions and to make the life and work of Anna Catharina Bischoff available to a wider interested public in form of a book. The research is undertaken in cooperation with the History Department of the University of Basel and coordinated at the Basel's Museum of Natural History.
