= Mercator European Research Centre =

- Formation: 1987
- Headquarters: Leeuwarden, Friesland
- Location: Doelestraat 8, 8911 DX Ljouwert/Leeuwarden, The Netherlands
- Project Manager: Jelske Dijkstra
- Parent organization: Fryske Akademy
- Website: https://www.mercator-research.eu/

The Mercator European Research Centre is located in Leeuwarden in the province of Friesland/Fryslân and is focused on regional and minority languages in Europe. It is hosted within the Frysk Akademy, which researches the Frisian language, whereas the Mercator centre has a broader pan-European focus. Mercator mostly focuses on the theme of education, and one of its main outputs is its ongoing Regional Dossier series.

== History ==
It was founded in 1987 as part of a network of three institutions under the Mercator Network, alongside partners in Aberystwyth and Barcelona. The centre in Leeuwarden was responsible for the education related topics, whereas Aberystwyth was responsible for media, and Barcelona for legislation. Thus, at this time, the centres were referred to as Mercator Education, Mercator Media and Mercator Legislation - however, since the closure of the latter two, Mercator Education has largely just been referred to as Mercator Research.

The three centres were initially funded through EU project funding, earmarked for this purpose and alongside the European Bureau of Lesser Used Languages. However, the funding line was lost in 2007 and the Bureau closed shortly after, as well as the activities of Mercator Media and Mercator Legislation. Mercator Education was able to continue with funding from the Province of Fryslân who remains it's core funder.

Mercator-Media published a journal called Mercator Media Forum, running for 10 volumes from 1995 to 2008. Many of the contributions featured researchers from the three Mercator centres during this time.

== Regional Dossier series ==
One of the flagship outputs of Mercator Research is its Regional Dossier series, which provides information on languages and their education systems . The series features close to 50 languages from across the wider Europe, including those in kin-state situations such as German minorities or Hungarian minorities in other states. This means the series has over 60 different linguistic areas covered and many of these have now had more than one edition of the dossier published. The series and individual publications have been widely cited, both in other academic publications but also research projects such as the Horizon Europe project Rise-Up.

== International Projects and Cooperation ==
Mercator Research continues to be involved in many projects and pan-European cooperation. It's researchers are often present at series such as the International Conference on Minority Languages, with it being the organising host institution in the 2019 edition. It has also been a partner in many EU funded projects, for example the Ownership and Leadership (OWL+) Erasmus+ project which focused on 5 under-resourced languages (Latgalian, Mirandese, South Saami and West Frisian).

Current Mercator Project Manager, Jelske Dijkstra, is a Core Group member of the EU-funded COST Action 'PLURILINGMEDIA' which is running from 2024 to 2028. Her role is the Head of the PLURILINGMEDIA Ad-hoc committee on Artificial Intelligence, looking into the role of AI within minority language media contexts.
