= Natural History Museum of Basel =

Natural history museum in Basel, Switzerland

Coordinates: 47°33′27″N 7°35′26″E

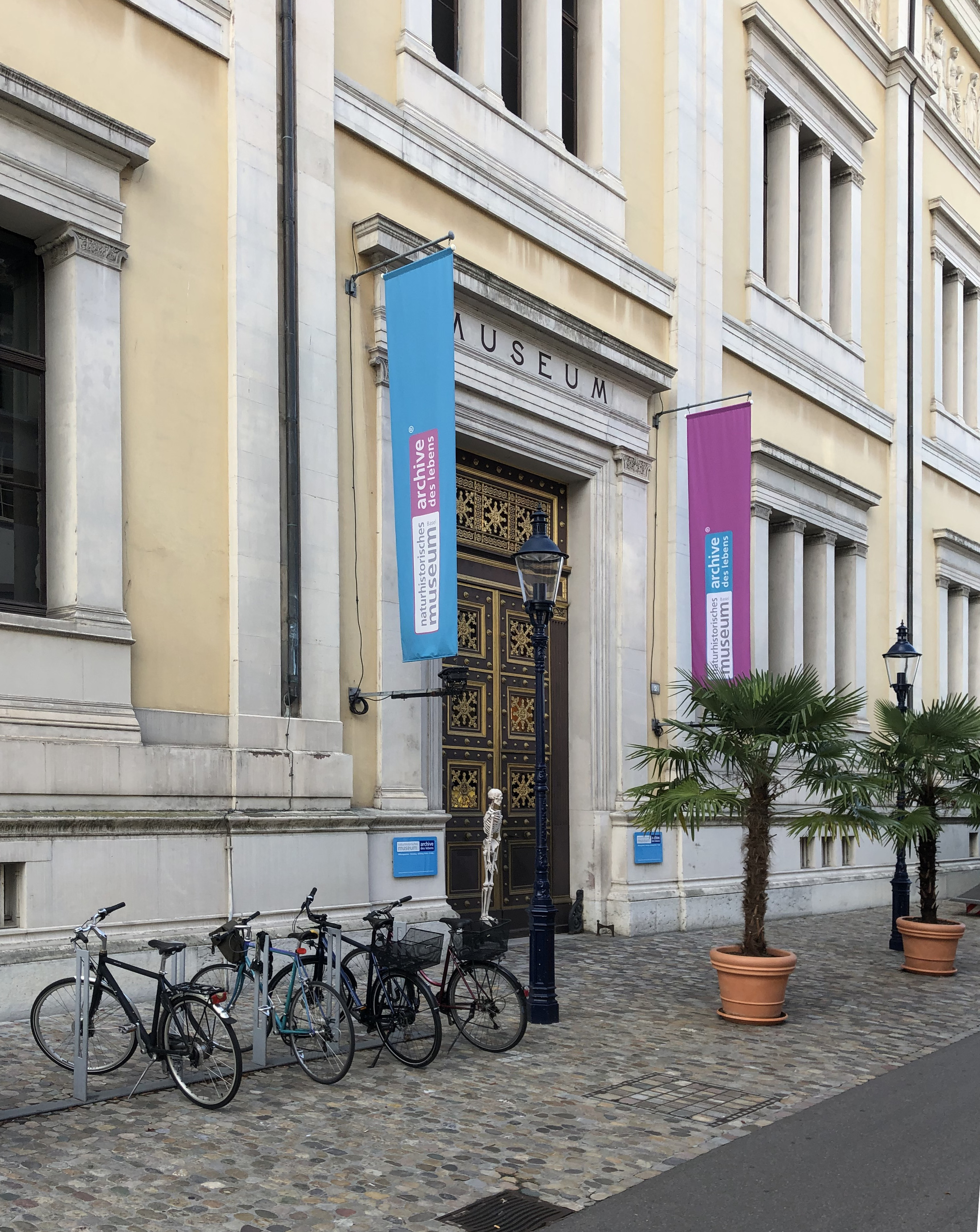
View of the museum building

Natural History Museum Basel (German: Naturhistorisches Museum Basel) is a natural history museum in Basel, Switzerland that houses wide-ranging collections focused on the fields of zoology, entomology, mineralogy, anthropology, osteology and paleontology. It has over 11 million objects.

It was established as a natural history collection in 1821.

The museum is a heritage site of national significance.

Here, the mummy of Anna Catharina Bischoff is kept and examined. It was found in 1975 during excavations in the Barfüsserkirche Basel. The skeleton of Theo the Pipe Smoker was found 1984 near the Theodorskirche in Kleinbasel.

== See also ==
- Museums in Basel
- List of museums in Switzerland
