= European Language Equality Network =

- Abbreviation: ELEN
- Established: 2011; 15 years ago
- Legal status: non-governmental organization
- Purpose: promotion of lesser-used languages in Europe
- Location(s): 6 plasenn Gwirioù Mab-Den, 29270 Karaez, France
- Coordinates: 48.27810°N 3.57290°W
- Region served: Europe
- Website: elen.ngo

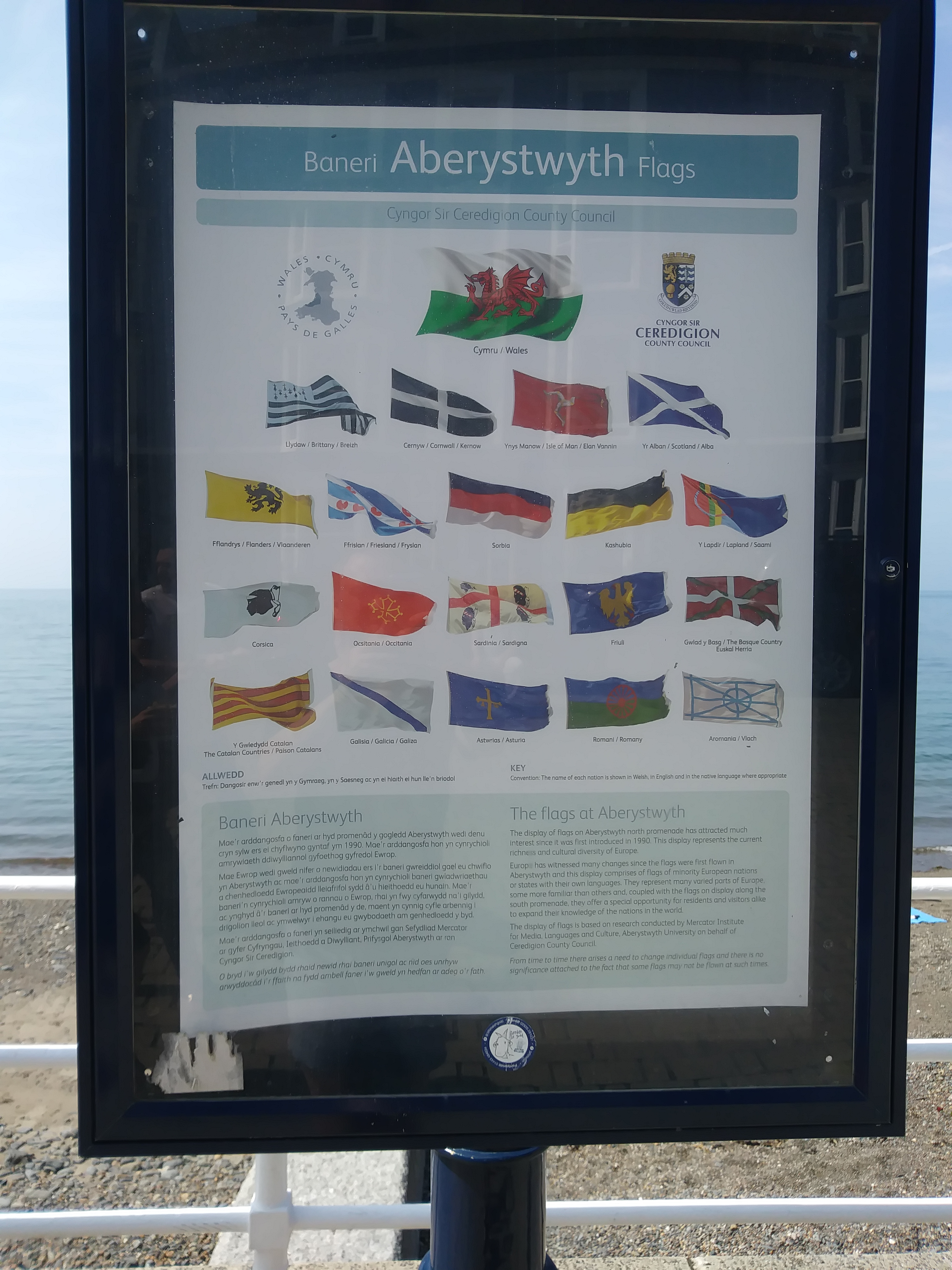
A sign in Aberystwyth, Wales, showing flags associated with minority languages.

The European Language Equality Network (ELEN) is an international non-governmental organization that is active at the European level which works to protect and promote European lesser-used languages (lesser-used languages), i.e. regional languages, minority languages, endangered languages, co-official languages and national languages of small nations. As of 2025, it states that 174 member organisations representing 50 languages in 25 European states, constitutes its network. This includes many language NGOs as well as academic institutions.

== History ==
ELEN was formed after the closure of EBLUL, European Bureau for Lesser-Used Languages, a non-governmental organization with similar goals founded in 1982 and closed in 2010 The Secretary-General of ELEN has been Davyth Hicks since its foundation and its current president is Elin Haf Gruffydd Jones, elected in 2021.

== General Assembly ==
ELEN holds an annual general assembly in a different location each year. The most recent editions were:

2025: Barcelona, Catalonia.

2024: Bilbao, the Basque Country

2023: Cagliari, Sardinia

2022: Cardiff, Wales

2021: Santiago de Compostela, Galicia

The next general assembly is to be held in Belfast in Ireland in 2026.
