= Theo the Pipe Smoker =

Skeleton found in a former potter's field in Basel, Switzerland

Theo the Pipe Smoker (* around 1790; † around 1820 in Kleinbasel) is the fictitious name of a man whose skeleton was found in 1984 in a former potter's field near the Theodorskirche (Theodor Church) in Kleinbasel (part of the Swiss city of Basel). He was named after the church's cemetery in which he was found.

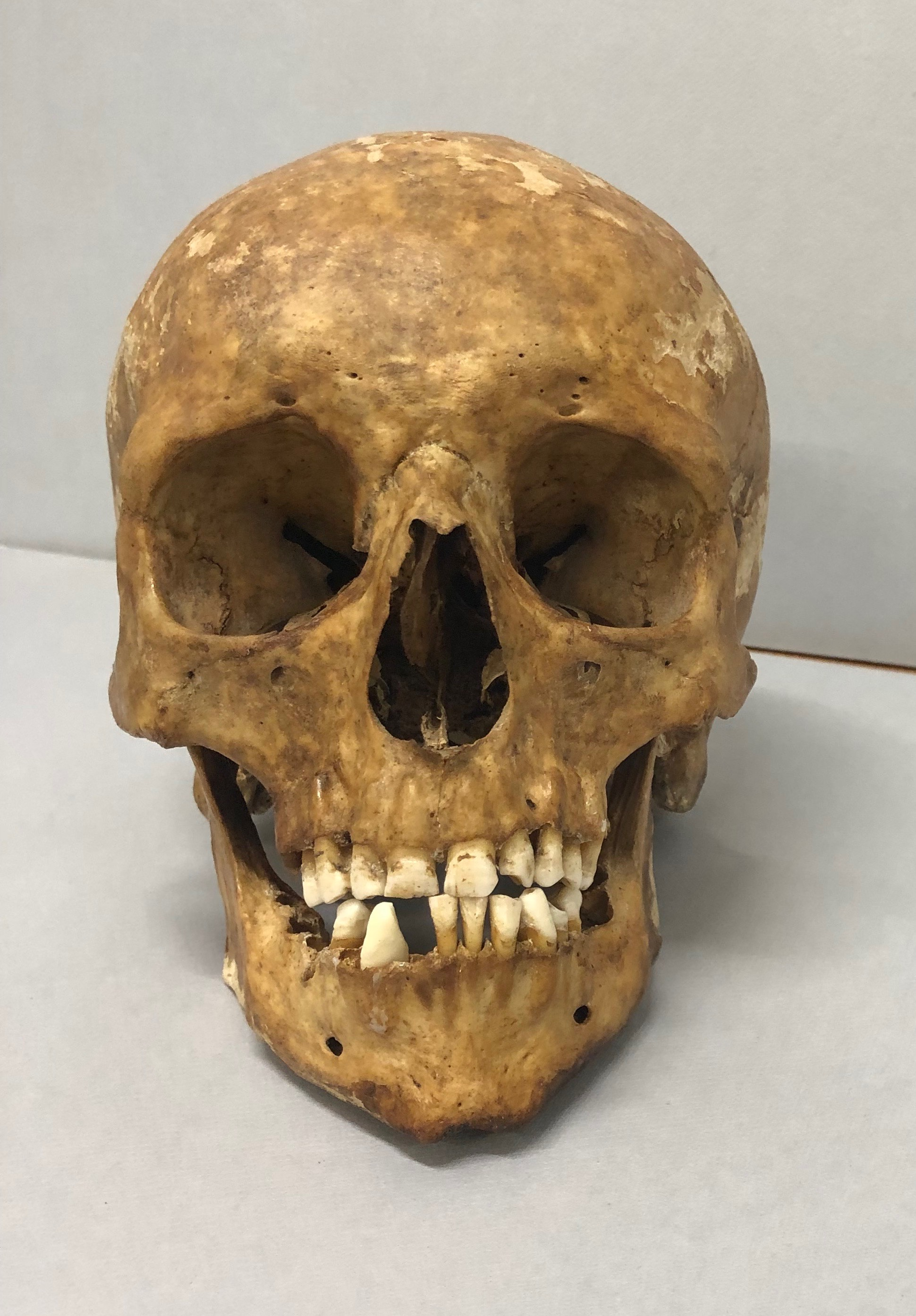
Theo's skull

== Kleinbasel around 1800 ==
Although Kleinbasel was part of the city of Basel since the Middle Ages, it remained independent in many respects due to its location on the right bank of the Rhine. It was home to middle class tradespeople with their families and domestic workers. The census of 1799 showed a population of just under 3000 people for the densely populated Kleinbasel, plus those not recorded, such as day labourers or passing travellers. When Theo was born, the Middle Bridge was the only link across the Rhine in the region, as the Wettstein Bridge (German: Wettsteinbrücke) was only built in 1879.

Back then, the center of Kleinbasel was the "Pond" (German: Teich), a network of canals with water from the river Wiese that was used for commercial purposes. It was used by sawmills, dye works and fulling mills, by tanners and millers, for gypsum mills, tobacco mills and others. In 1823, the canals drove a total of 64 wheels, 34 of which were grain mills. They were heavily polluted by sewage and faeces. Kleinbasel's "Pond" was filled in between 1907 and 1917. The Teichgässlein ("Pond Alley") between Claragraben and Ochsengasse still recalls this pond today.

On the southern and eastern side of Kleinbasel, that were not traversed by watercourses, many of Kleinbasel's inhabitants lived on agriculture, as winegrowers or sailors.

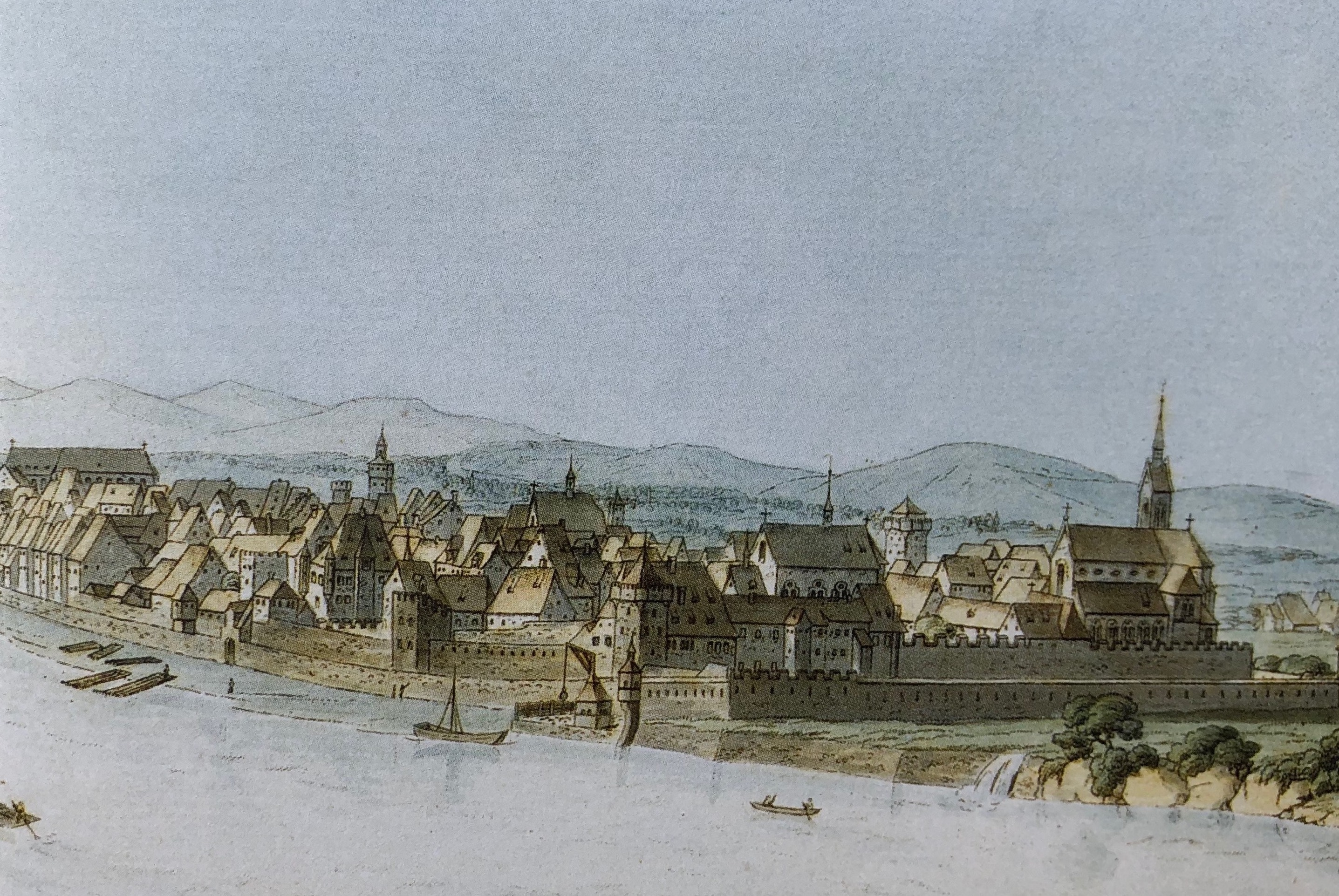
Kleinbasel around 1795; the Theodorskirche on the right. Etching by Christian von Mechel (detail)

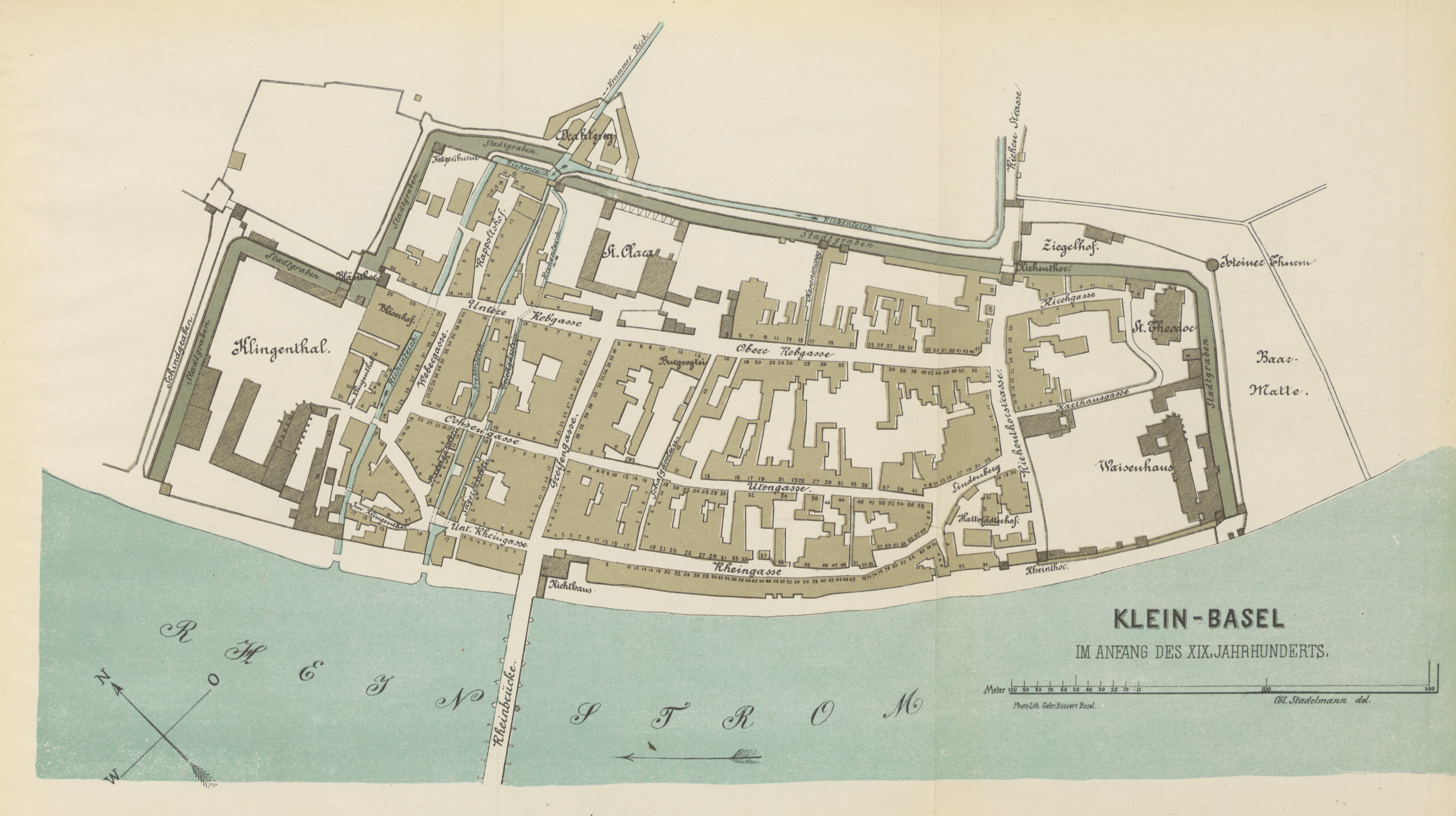
Kleinbasel at the beginning of the 19th century

== Cemetery ==
The former vineyard area to the west of the Theodorskirche was purchased in 1779 by council member Remigius Merian. After the last grape harvest, it was prepared for the long-needed extension of the regular churchyard; the first funeral took place on 5 October 1779. The new cemetery was enclosed by a wall and was named Merianscher Totenacker (Merian's Graveyard) after its former owner. Members of the lower social class were mainly buried there. However, as its capacity was quickly exhausted, two more areas were used as cemeteries, the Kleeacker in 1805 and the Mättelein in 1831; these too did not prove to be sustainable. In 1832, a new cemetery was established outside the city near the Messeplatz for the rapidly growing population of Basel. The Merianscher Totenacker near the Theodorskirche was closed as of 1 May 1833. The Theodor schoolhouse, built in 1855/56, stands on the site of the former graveyard.

During these 54 years, a total of 4334 people died in Kleinbasel. They were buried there in the different cemeteries, but most of them in the small Merianscher Totenacker. Amongst those were inhabitants of Kleinbasel: craftsman, small traders, carters, fishermen, and their families. All burials were recorded in the register of deaths of the St. Theodor parish with first and last name, age, and often also with profession and origin.

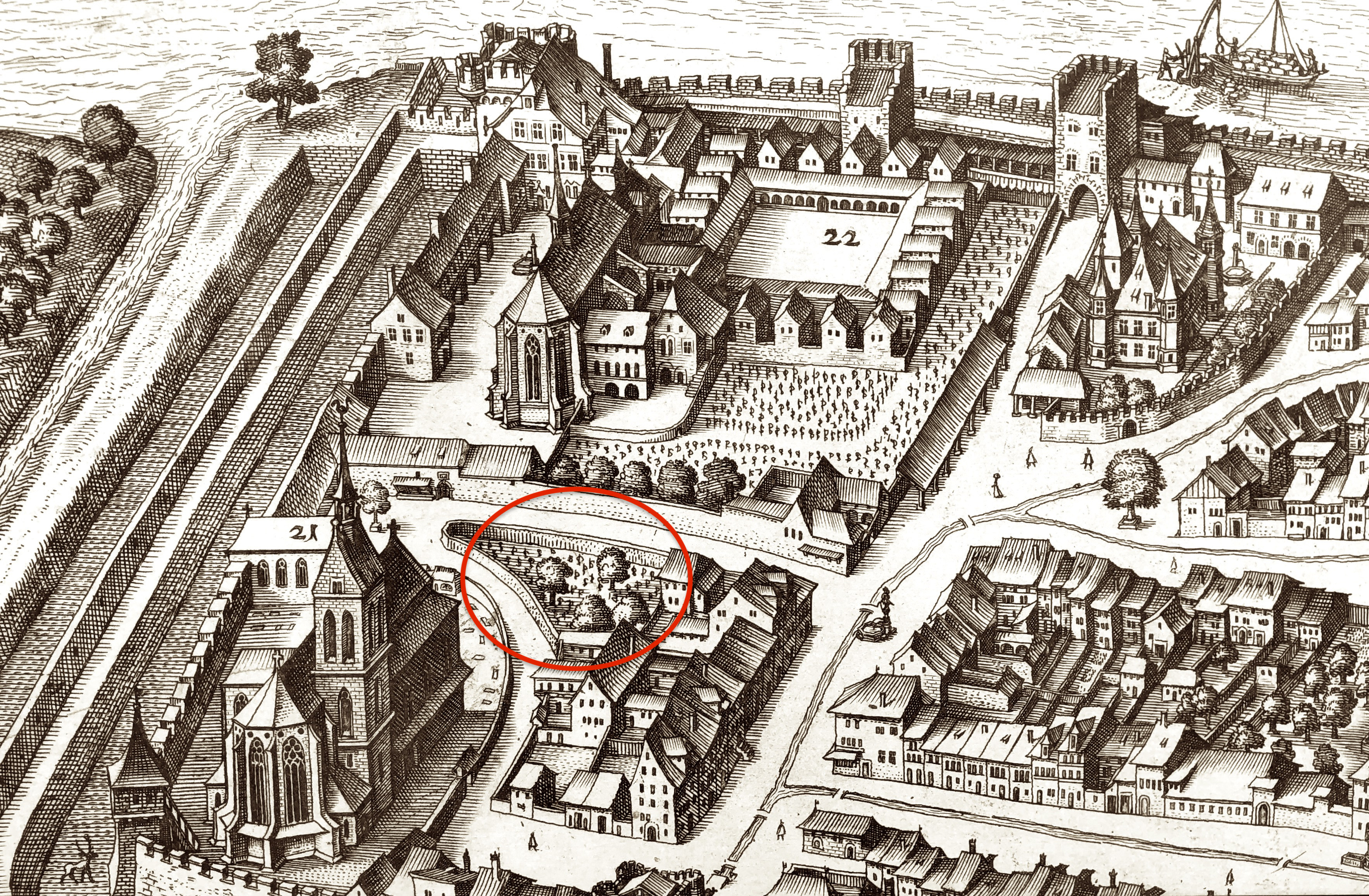
Location of the cemetery near the Theodorskirche, then still a vineyard. Representation from the map of Matthäus Merian, 1615

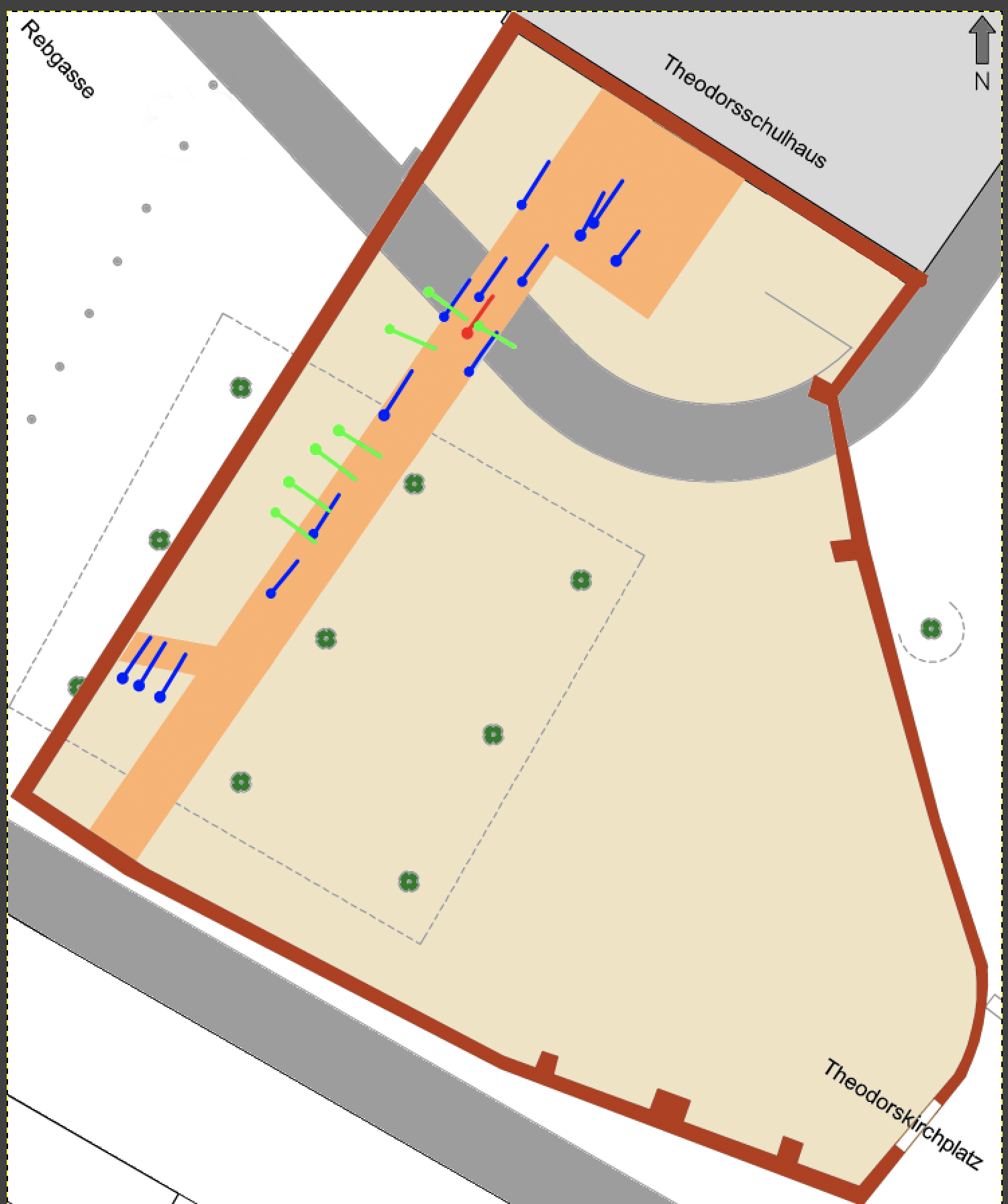
Area of the old Merianscher Totenacker. The excavations of 1984 are highlighted in colour.
Blue: sites of the younger phase,
green: older phase,
red: location of Theo's grave.

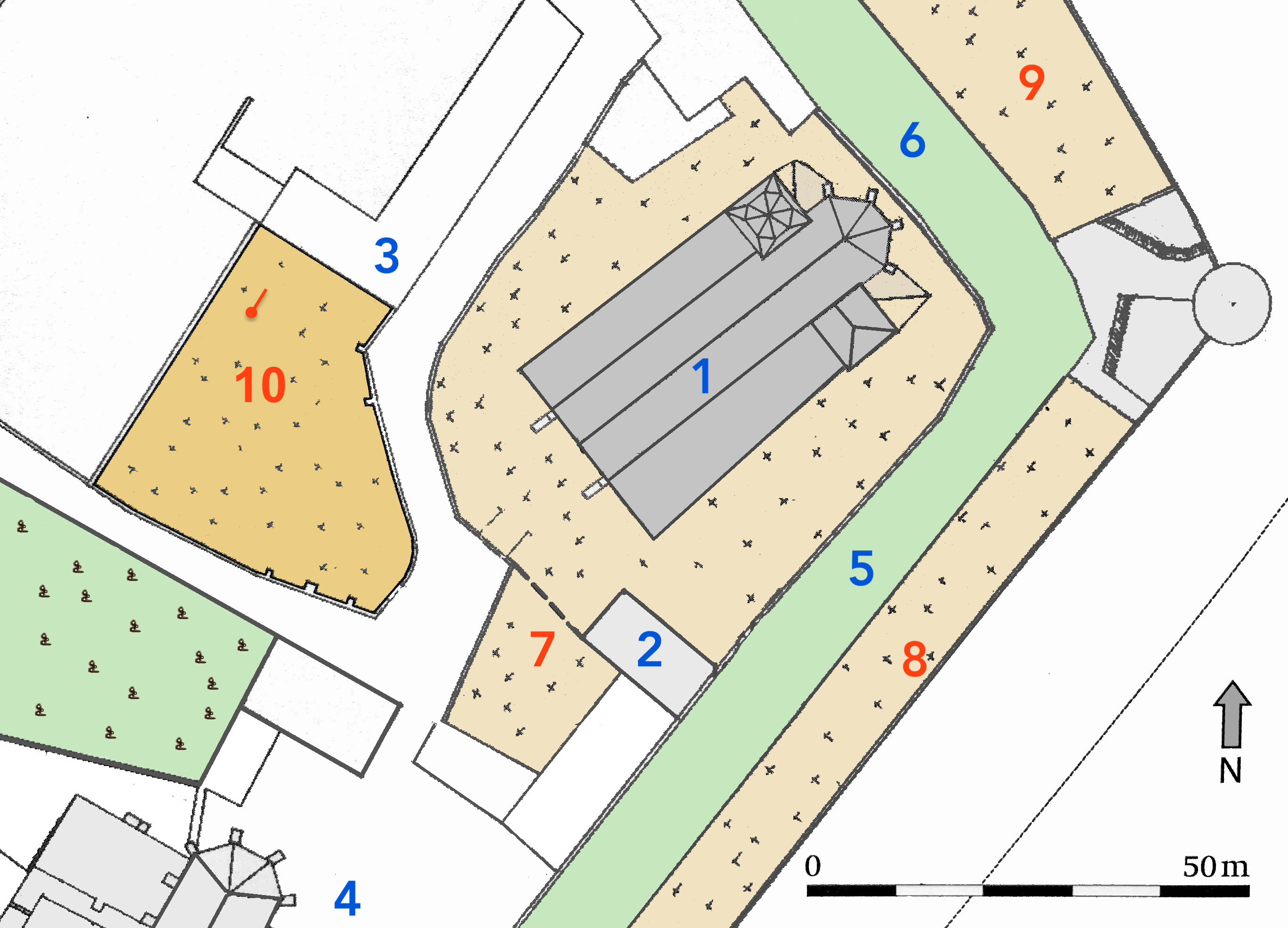
Location map:
1. Theodorskirche
2. Allerheiligenkapelle
(All Saints' chapel)
3. Vicarage
4. Kartausgasse
5. Theodorsgraben
6. Claragraben
7. Special cemetery
8. Kleeacker cemetery
9. Mättelein cemetery
10. Merianscher Totenacker with Theo's grave

== Discovery ==
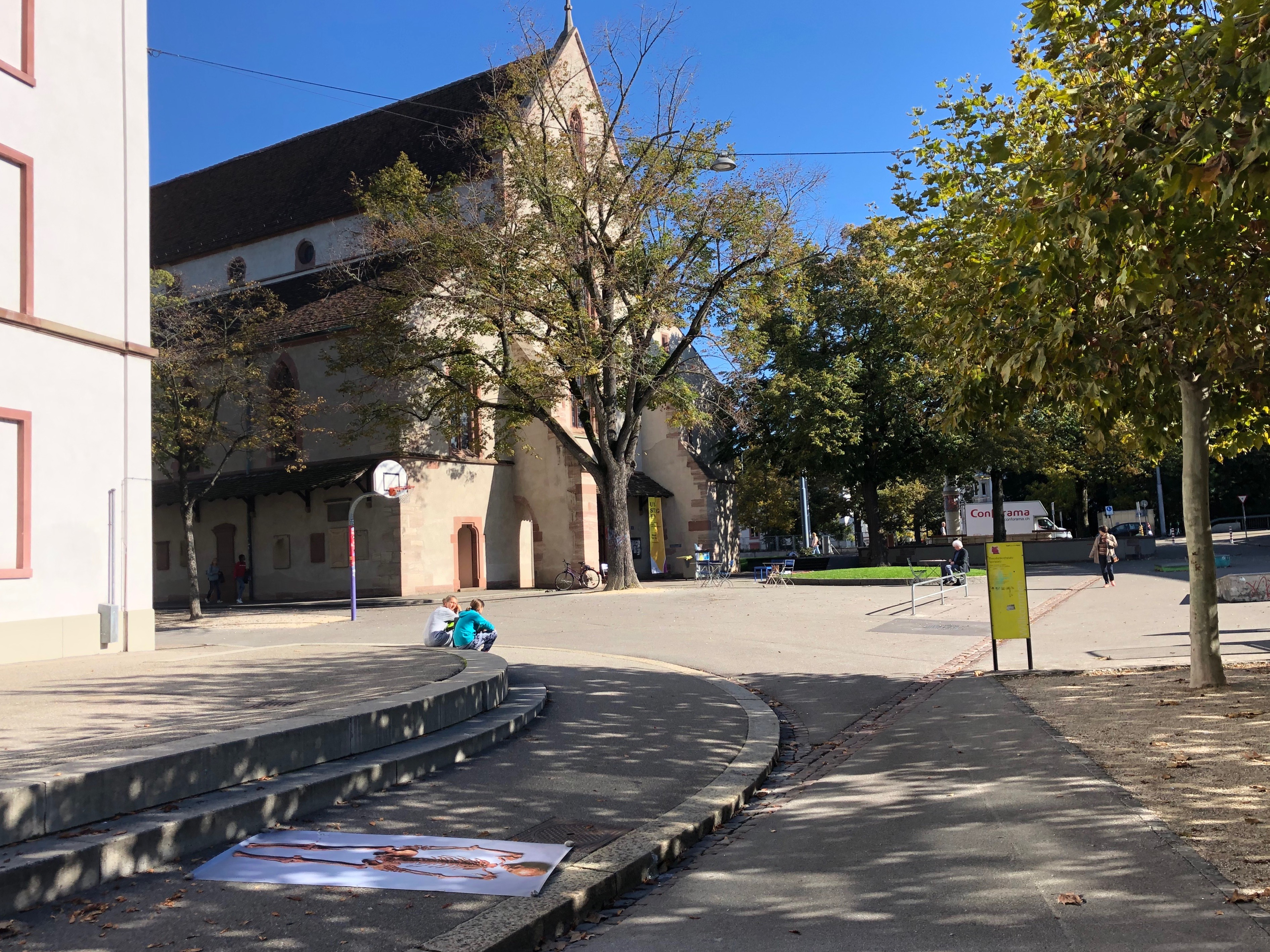
The site of the discovery on the pavement of the Rebgasse. The Theodorskirche in the background

A heat pump was to be installed in this schoolhouse in 1984, which required new pipes to be built. The discovery of graves in the area west of the Theodorskirche next to the schoolhouse was to be expected. Thus, the excavation work was accompanied by archaeologists of the Archäologischen Bodenforschung Basel-Stadt, the archaeological department of the Canton of Basel-Stadt. In the winter of 1984, workers came across the remains of 24 graves in the western part of the former cemetery.

Theo's body was found in the middle of a stack of six in grave 19. He was buried in a southwest–northeast orientation in a stretched supine position. There were hardly any traces left of a coffin. The skeleton was recovered completely, only the bones of a foot had to remain in the ground, as the wall of the pit could not be removed for static reasons. The neighbouring graves 15, 17, and 22 were at a 90-degree angle, oriented northwest–southeast, and tended to be less deep. Theo's grave was dated as later than these, but earlier than grave 20, oriented in the same direction at his feet. This means that Theo had been buried before the final phase of the cemetery. The fact that these graves of the older phase were partly higher than the graves from the younger phase is possibly related to the fact that the "decree regarding the burial of corpses" of 25 February 1814 demanded that those who had died of "nervous fever" (typhus) should be buried in particularly deep graves in order to prevent "toxic fumes" from rising. The archaeologists concluded that this change in burial methods was possibly connected with the great typhoid epidemic of 1814. The older graves were oriented northeast–southwest and rather shallow, whereas the graves of the younger phase were oriented southwest–northeast and tended to be placed deeper in the ground.

So, Theo's body had obviously neither been buried at the beginning of this younger burial phase of 1814 nor the last one around 1833, but probably in the 1820s. A total of 24 skeletons were recovered, brought to the Natural History Museum of Basel and archived there in the collection.

== Scientific research ==
Identified historical skeletons are mostly from persons of the social upper class. Their graves are often in churches and the circumstances of their burial are well documented. The project of Theo's identification is therefore an exception intending to identify a nameless person, a "nobody" from the lower class.

The research on Theo's skeleton and his person was also the beginning of the extensive Basel Citizen Science program (in German: Bürgerforschung Basel-Stadt, BBS). Until 2019 around 70 volunteer researchers were involved in this project transcribing historical sources and processing data. Another project of Citizen Science was the research on Anna Catharina Bischoff, an ancestor of the former British prime minister Boris Johnson.

The numerous written and pictorial documents in the Staatsarchiv Basel-Stadt (State Archives of Basel City) from the 18th and 19th centuries greatly facilitated the research. Natural sciences and humanities disciplines are working together and complementing each other, with genealogical research playing a key role. The project is headed by anthropologist Gerhard Hotz, curator at the Natural History Museum Basel.

== First investigations ==
As part of an exercise conducted by the Institute for Integrative Prehistory and Archaeological Science of the University of Basel, two students, anthropologist Simon Kramis and historian Fabian Link, examined the skeleton from tomb 19 in 2004 and noticed two oval, almost circular gaps in the young man's dentures, which aroused the young researchers' curiosity and led to further investigations of the skeleton. These revealed that the deceased was a male who had died between the age of 28 and 32.

It is not known where Theo was born. A strontium isotope analysis of three of his molars showed that he had most probably lived in the Basel area until the age of 13. Investigations of dental cement and bone showed that as a young man he had suffered at least two phases of stress and signs of incipient osteoarthritis. He was rather small at 1,60 metres and had a balanced diet even during his boyhood. This suggests that he was not among the poorest. As analyses of the arm and clavicle bones showed, Theo was most likely a right-handed craftsman.

Theo died too young; the life expectancy of a thirty-year-old in the 19th century was 49 years. In the years before his death he was healthy and well-fed: His skeleton showed no serious illness or malnutrition. The cause of death could possibly have been an injury to the soft tissues caused by violence, or an infectious disease with a rapid course that left no traces on the skeleton.

== Teeth ==
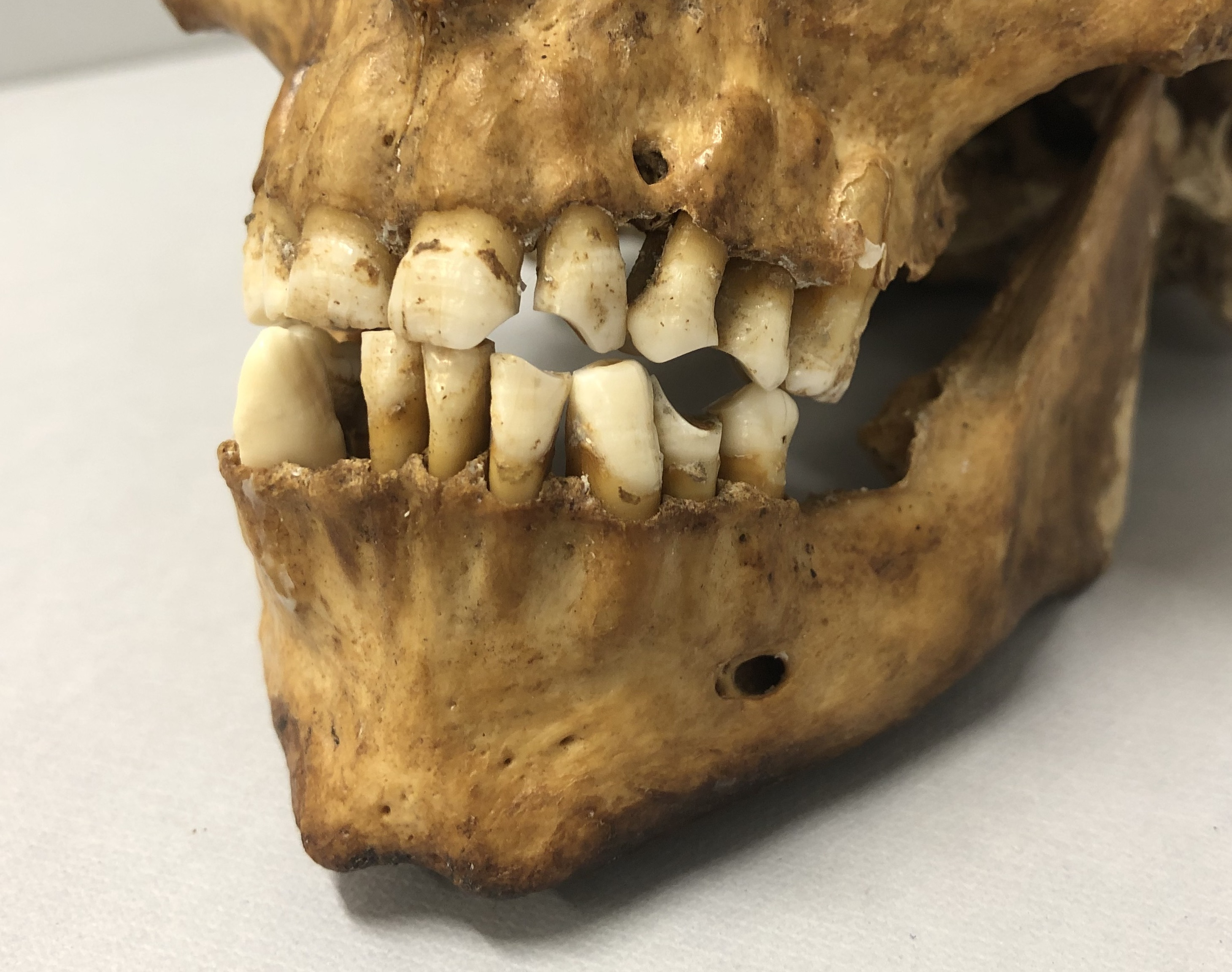
Set of teeth with the two characteristic gaps

Theo's teeth were badly affected by tooth decay or had died off. Apart from that, the aforementioned oval gaps on the left side of the dentition are remarkable, as they almost form a circular cross-section when the jaw is slightly opened. Examinations with a scanning electron microscope showed fine scratch marks on the tooth surface, indicating a wear process caused by the ceramic mouthpiece of a clay pipe and the fine quartz grains contained therein.

Such abrasions occurred almost worldwide from the 17th to the 19th century because clay pipes were widespread at the time. Excavations in graveyards with well-documented information on the deceased show that excessive smoking of clay pipes, which could also be smoked while working without using the hands, was more common in socially weak and hardworking classes. Since the clay mouthpiece was harder than the tooth enamel, it ground into the surrounding teeth over time. This exposed the softer dentin and intensified the wear process. Pipe holes develop after five to ten years of intensive smoking. Consequently, Theo must have been a long-time smoker who belonged to the artisan population.

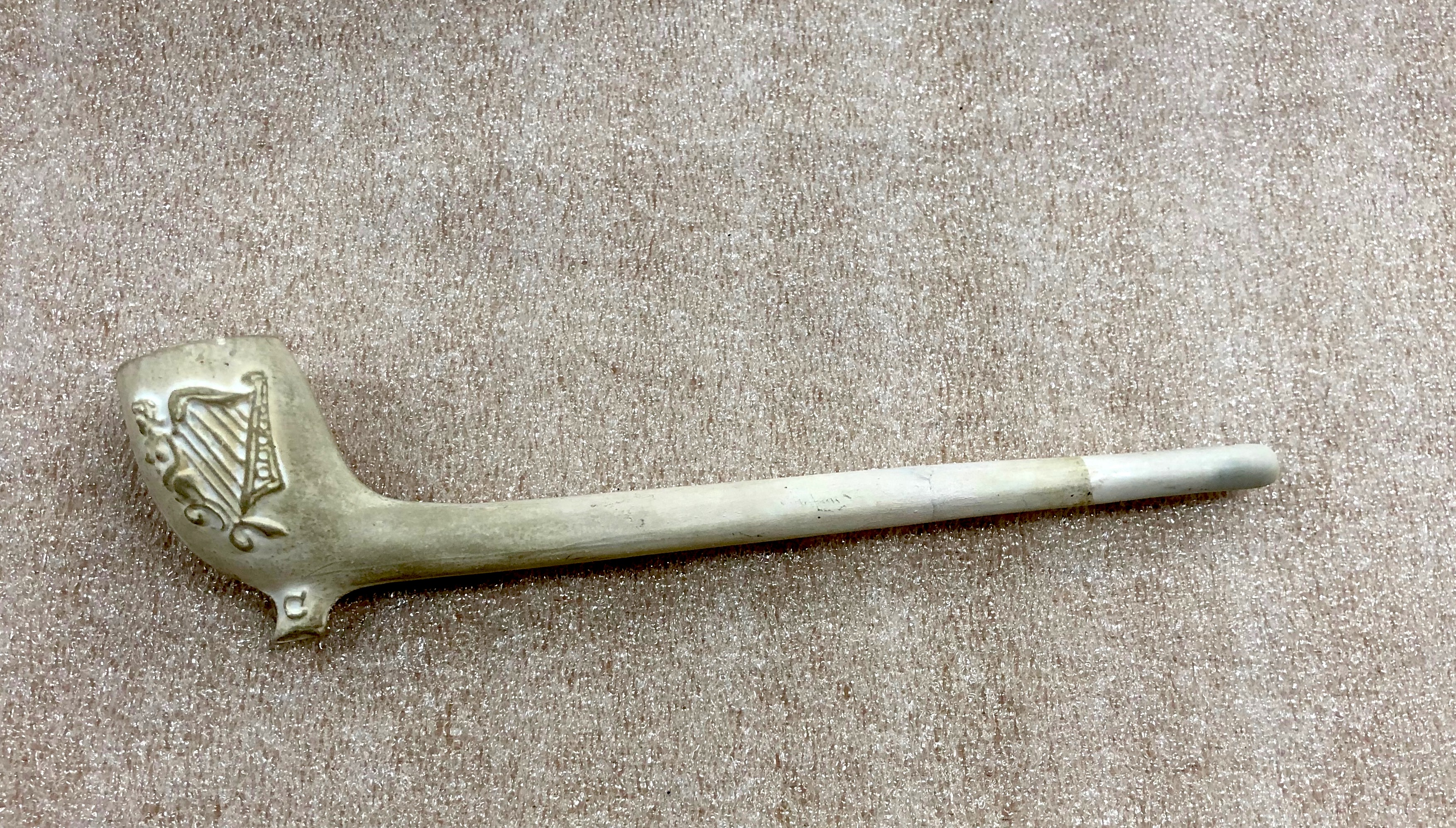
Clay pipe, as Theo might have smoked

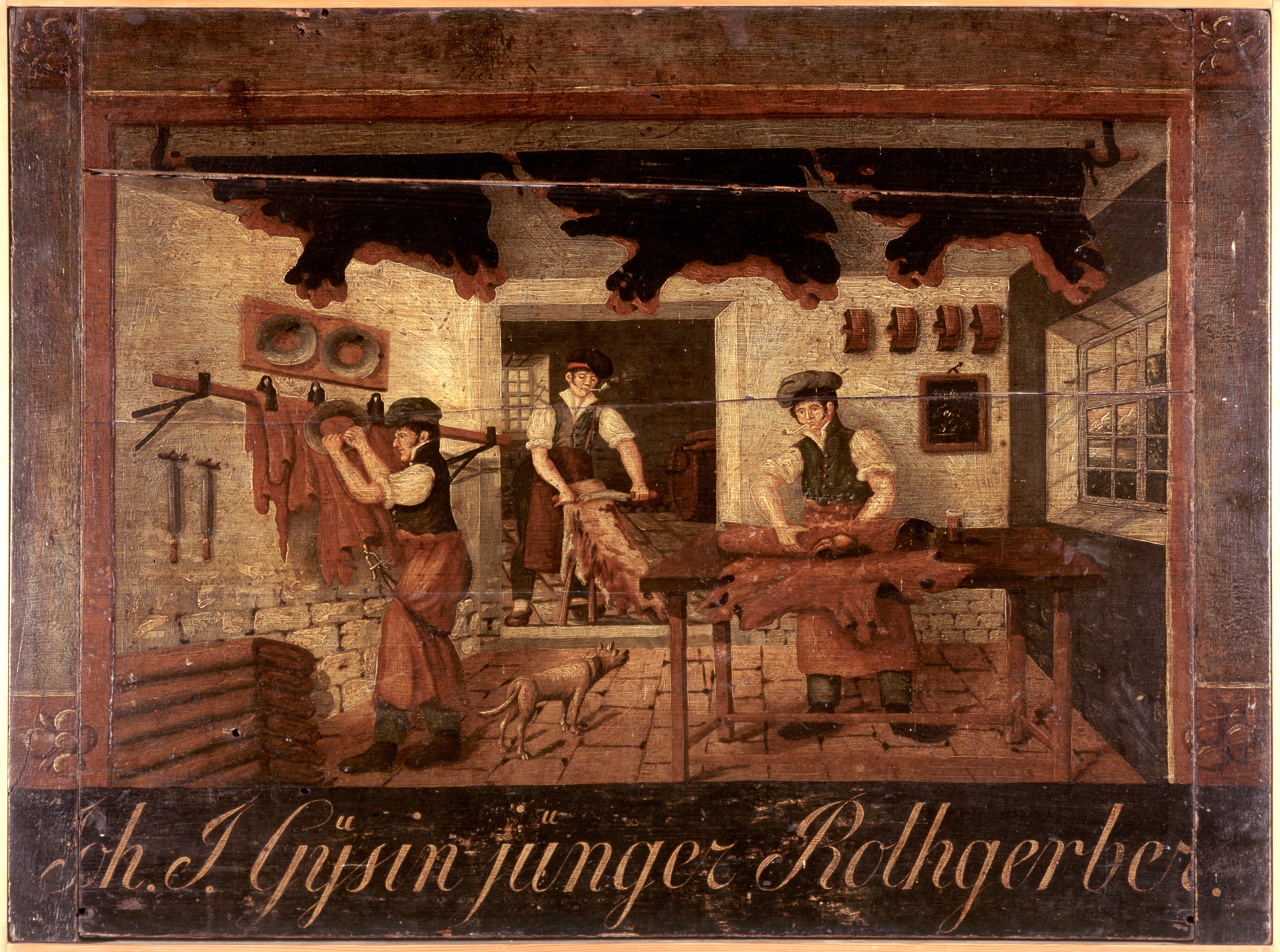
Tannery in Liestal; two tanners with a pipe in their mouth. Wooden sign, around 1820

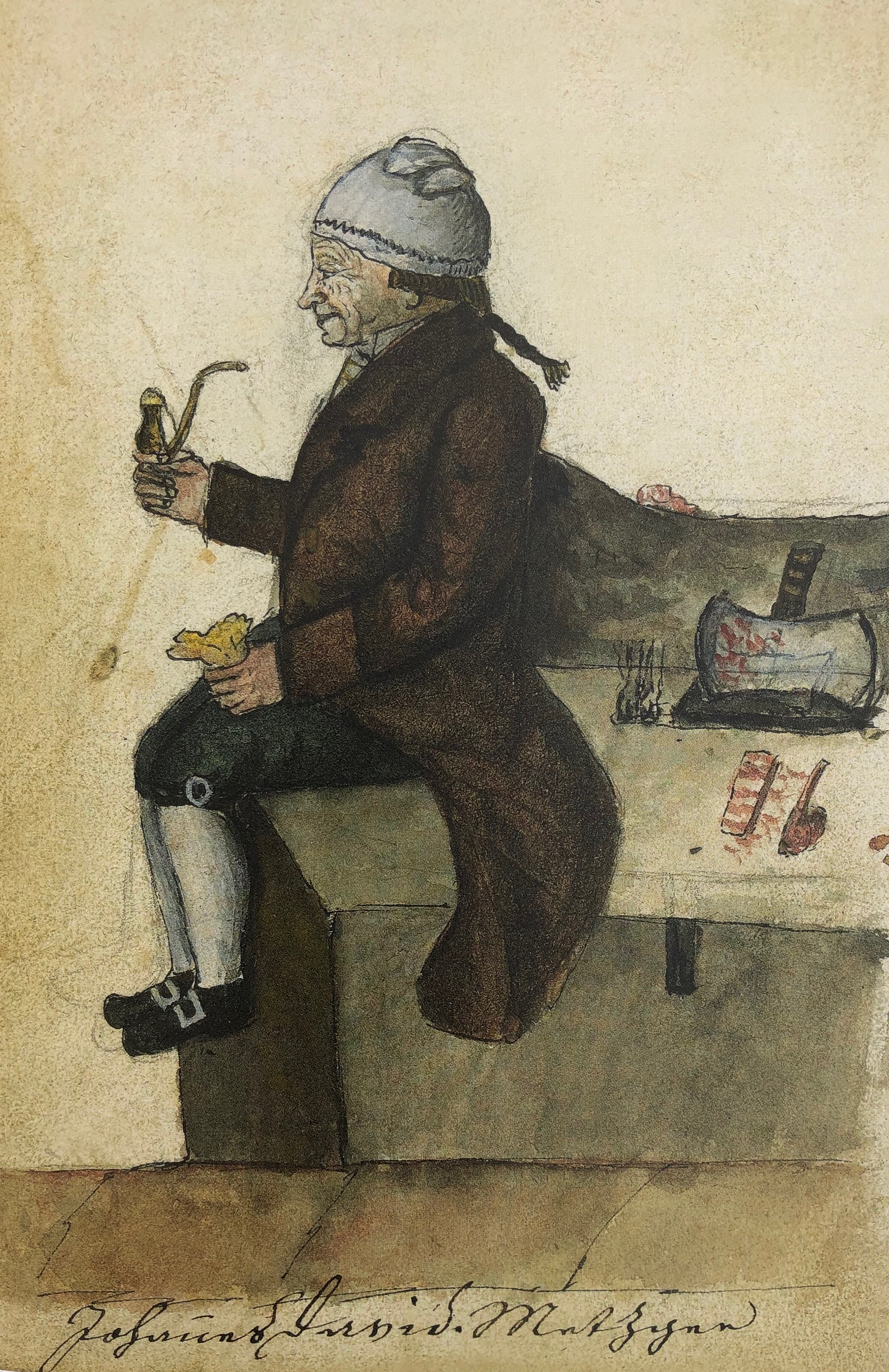
Master butcher Johannes David Bienz (1755–1829) with a lidded pipe; watercolour by Wilhelm Oser, c. 1820

== Who was Theo? ==
On the small Merianscher Totenacker, which was in use from 5 October 1779 to 1 May 1833, there were neither gravestones nor memorial plaques nor a map of the area, nothing reminded of the dead who had been buried here. In the Staatsarchiv Basel-Stadt, on the other hand, there was the death register of the parish of St. Theodor which listed the names, professions, age at death, and places of birth of all those who died in Kleinbasel. Information on the burial place, however, was missing; it was not specified whether a deceased person found their final resting place in the Theodorskirche, in the Merianscher Totenacker, or in another of Kleinbasel's cemeteries.

Of the 4334 people who died in Kleinbasel during this period, 2069 were male. One of them had to be Theo. Since his age could be determined to be around 30 years, all candidates who were younger than 26 and older than 34 were eliminated, reducing the number of eligible candidates to 134. For another 16 men, a special register, the Stone Book, contained the information that they were buried in the Theodorskirche. According to this, these 16 came from the upper social class, as only they could afford a better burial place. 118 names remained. Since Theo had belonged to the younger burial phase and the archaeologists connected this to the great typhoid epidemic of 1814, all men who died before 1814 were struck off the list. 25 men remained. However, the connection with the typhoid epidemic has not yet been proven. Should this assumption prove to be incorrect, the search would have to focus on those who died before 1814.

As Theo must have had the pipe in his mouth most of the time during his work and smoking was forbidden during activities in the wood and textile trades, the probability that he had pursued such a profession must have been rather low. Theo's profession was rather in those areas where fine-motor skills were in demand, such as rope maker, baker, or tailor.

All information about Theo and his everyday life was collected in a database. It took into account all candidates who could be considered to be Theo and assigned them each a certain probability to be Theo based on information about his profile. In 2008, the database still listed twelve so-called top candidates who had a probability of 96 percent of being identical to Theo.

In 2008/2009, the first attempt was made to isolate Theo's DNA from the skeleton. It was possible to remove uncontaminated dentin from a molar and isolate fragments of mitochondrial DNA from it. Mitochondrial DNA is inherited from mother to children, but only daughters can pass it on to the next generation. In order to find out whether one of the top twelve candidates was Theo, descendants had to be found on the female line in order to compare their DNA with Theo's. Genealogical research on descendants on the female line is demanding and time-consuming since every time women married, they adopted their husband's name.

== The search for descendants ==
From the list of twelve, genealogical research was able to determine the names of fifteen possible descendants of the top candidates. They were announced to the press together with the list of the twelve candidates on 10 March 2010, in the hope that descendants still living would recognise relatives. Television, radio, and print media also reported on the search. For reasons of protection of descendants, care was taken to ensure than only names of potential descendants who had already been dead for a hundred years were published; protection of descendants takes effect upon the death of a person for a period of 100 years.

Possible descendants
Family name	Given name	Year of birth	Year of death	Location
Brogli	Otto	1887	1924	Mühlhausen
Bürgin	Adelheid	1875	?	Frankfurt/Montreux
Catelli-Sacher	Emma	1896	1972	Sissach
Cavaignac-Spitteler	Bertha	1874	1948	Argentina
Erni	Albert	1880	1955	Rothenfluh
Erni	Maria	1886	1964	Rothenfluh
Sacher	Frieda	1902	1979	Gelterkinden
Sacher	Rosa	1894	1965	Gelterkinden
Senn	Heinrich	1887	1949	Basel
Senn	Johannes	1883	1960	Basel
Spitteler	W. Eugen	1866	1937	Baraderos, Argentina
Spitteler-Zocu	W. Theophil	1870	1927	San Carlos, Argentinien
Wirz	Adolf	1907	1984	Basel
Wüthrich	Karl	1906	1984	Basel
Wüthrich	Max	1904	1985	Basel

Indeed, twenty people came forward, most of whom were also descendants of Theo candidates. However, since they were descendants on the male line, they were not carriers of the mitochondrial DNA and no DNA comparison could be made. Therefore, the genealogical procedure was adapted: Now, based on the list of twelve, through extensive genealogical family research descendants of the potential Theo candidates were to be found. In the case of several candidates the family lines broke off and it was not possible to find living descendants. With one exception: Johannes Bieler. But the DNA comparison showed a negative result and Bieler could be removed from the list of 12 candidates. Eleven candidates were left:

Eleven candidates
ID-No.	Family name	Given name	Age	Year of birth	Profession
1	Bender	Christian Friedrich	33	1784	Master glazier
2	Itin	Achilles	31	1786	Father: city soldier
3	Kestenholz	Peter	29	1789	Tinker
4	Gessler	Johann Jakob	32	1782	Tanner
5	Merian	Johann	30	1784	Father: rope maker
6	Lang	Niklaus	28	1794	Trade clerk
7	Schmid	Johann Jakob	33	1782	Mill maker
8	Kunz	Valentin	33	1789	Soaper
9	Perrot	Franz Georg	26	1793	Trade clerk
10	Wohnlich	Friedrich	31	1783	Baker
11	Hediger	Jakob	27	1789	Factory worker

Sometimes tragic fates hide behind these names. The following information on the life circumstances and family situation of the first two candidates, who could have been Theo, is based on the one hand on the research of several genealogists of the Citizen Science Basel (BBS), Marina Zulauf, Ursula Fink, Diana Gysin, and Beat Stadler, who searched the various archives, and on the other hand on genealogical and job-specific research. All results are based on documents directly related to the two men.

Theo's real name was most likely Christian Friedrich Bender or Achilles Itin. Since no descendants of either of them could be found through the female line, a reliable identification has not yet been possible. What the men have in common is that they both had a "migrant background", i.e. their families came to Basel from outside the city in the hope of a better economic future. Only Bender managed to establish a professional existence. Two of the ten candidates ended their lives by suicide.

== Christian Friedrich Bender (1783–1816) ==
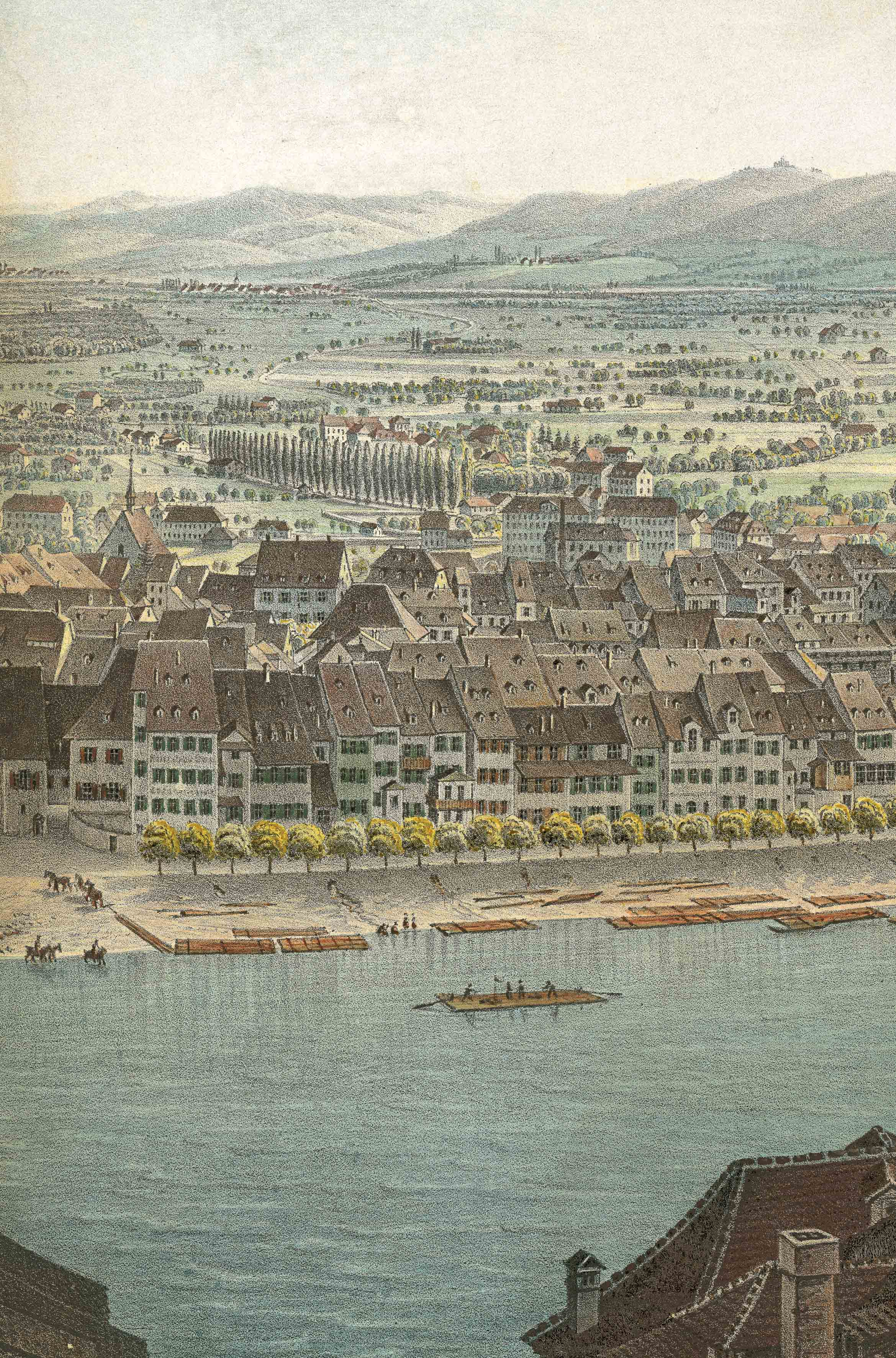
Basel's Rhine bank around 1842. Bender lived in the fifth house from the left, slightly set back. Pen-and-ink drawing by Anton Winterlin (detail).

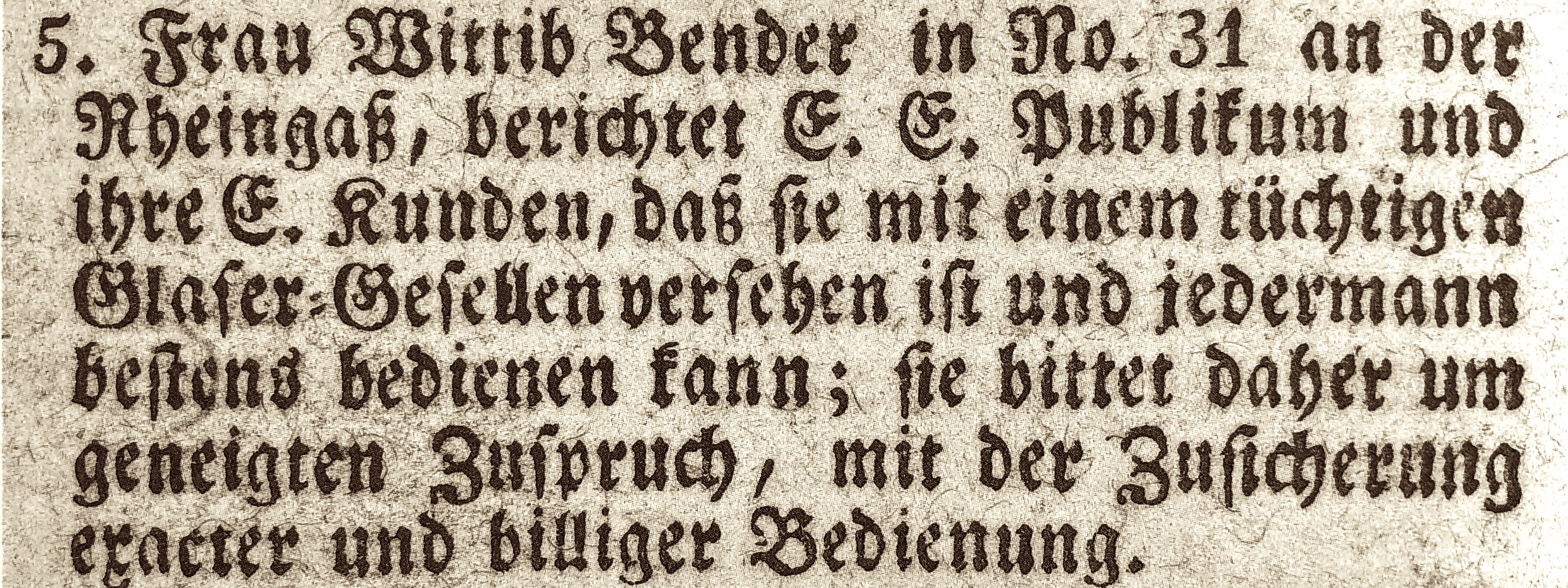
Notification of the widow Bender in the Avis-Blatt, one week after Christian Bender's death

Christian Friedrich Bender was born on 23 December 1783 in Bouxwiller in Lower Alsace. In October 1808 he was accepted into the Zunft zum Himmel ("Guild to the Sky") in Basel as a glazier on the basis of a settlement and trade permit. When and why he came to Basel is not known. On 30 September 1806 he married Sara Bauler, the daughter of a well-off master tailor. The Benders lived in a narrow two-story house at Rheingasse 21. At the time of Bender's death, five of the couple's nine children were still alive.

On 16 November 1816, Bender took his own life at six in the morning by cutting his throat with a razor. The cut was made with great force and went down to the cervical vertebrae. His wife Sara stated that "she wanted to help him; but he pushed her away with force, when he immediately made a second cut". "Trial cuts", as they are often made in such suicides, were omitted.

On the same day, three official investigations took place. Their detailed descriptions in the records provide much information about an average family in the 19th century. According to Bender's wife, the reason for his deed "was a mental illness", which she attributed to religious doubts and fears. It is also conceivable, however, that she advanced a disease so that her husband would receive an honest grave inside the churchyard and not be buried outside the cemetery walls, as was customary for suicides at the time.

Today, however, there are several doubts regarding the circumstances of his death, and there are some indications of external influence. As can be seen from the records, the crime scene was changed considerably after the crime. Why was the assistant surgeon on duty so quickly in the early morning? Why was the dead man moved from the floor of the bedroom to the bed in the adjacent room with his help? Bender is said to have killed himself standing up – why were the sheets of the bed in the bedroom full of blood? Many questions remain unanswered. Due to the fact that the neck muscles on the right side were completely severed but remained almost intact on the left side, it can be concluded that Bender made the cut from the top right to the bottom left, so he must have been left-handed. If it now turns out that Theo was identical with Christian Friedrich Bender, this could indicate that Bender was killed – Theo was right-handed.

Bender's height was measured during the investigation of his death. It was about 1,60 metres – exactly the height calculated for Theo. Unfortunately, Theo's cervical spine did not survive, otherwise it would have been possible to detect any traces of cuts.

The enterprising Sara Bender continued her husband's glazier business thanks to a special permit. In August 1818 she married master glazier Adam Uehlinger, had two more children, died on 26 June 1839 at the age of 55 and left behind a considerable fortune of almost 20'000 francs.

== Achilles Itin (1786–1816) ==
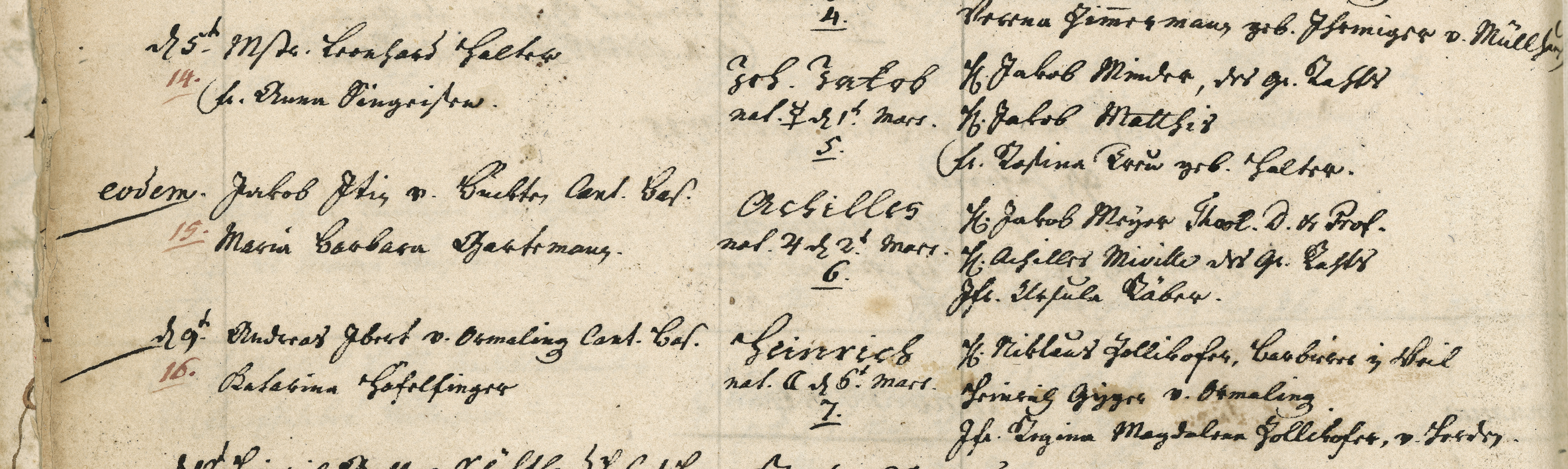
Achilles Itin's entry in the baptismal register of the Theodorskirche on 2 March 1786

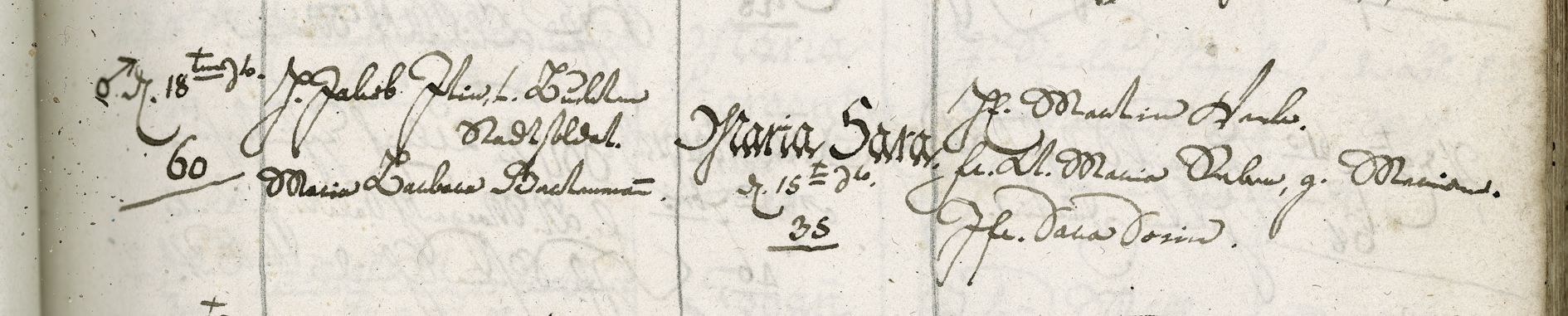
Baptismal entry of Maria Sara Itin, the youngest sister of Achilles Itin, in the church book of St. Theodor on 15 August 1835. On the left, between the parents' names the entry “Stadtsoldat” (city soldier)

Achilles Itin was born in Basel as the third of seven children. On 2 March 1786, the professor of theology Jakob Meyer and the master dyer and Grand Councillor Achilles Miville were entered into the baptism register of the Theodorskirch as his godparents – perhaps a sign of charity towards the suffering family.

The family probably lived in poor conditions in two or three subletted rooms in the district of the parish of St. Theodor in Kleinbasel. The father was a city soldier and had to feed the family of nine with a monthly wage of ten francs. His brother Hans Jakob Itin worked as a carter servant for the city. It is unknown whether they were supported by the city.

Achilles, as the unmarried son, probably also lived with the family, together with his unmarried sisters. The oldest sister married Isaac Roth, a widower and silk weaver, in 1811. Of her seven children, the three youngest died as infants, the second son, Jacob Conrad Roth, drowned in the Rhine at the age of thirteen. Two of Achilles' sisters bore an illegitimate daughter. One of the girls was born deaf and mute. She later gave birth to two illegitimate children who both died shortly after birth. Three of the sisters who remained unmarried died like their father in the hospital for the poor in Liestal.

Achilles Itin remained unmarried and died at the age of 30 on 14 November 1816, a few months after his mother. Nothing is known about his professional activity and the cause of his death.

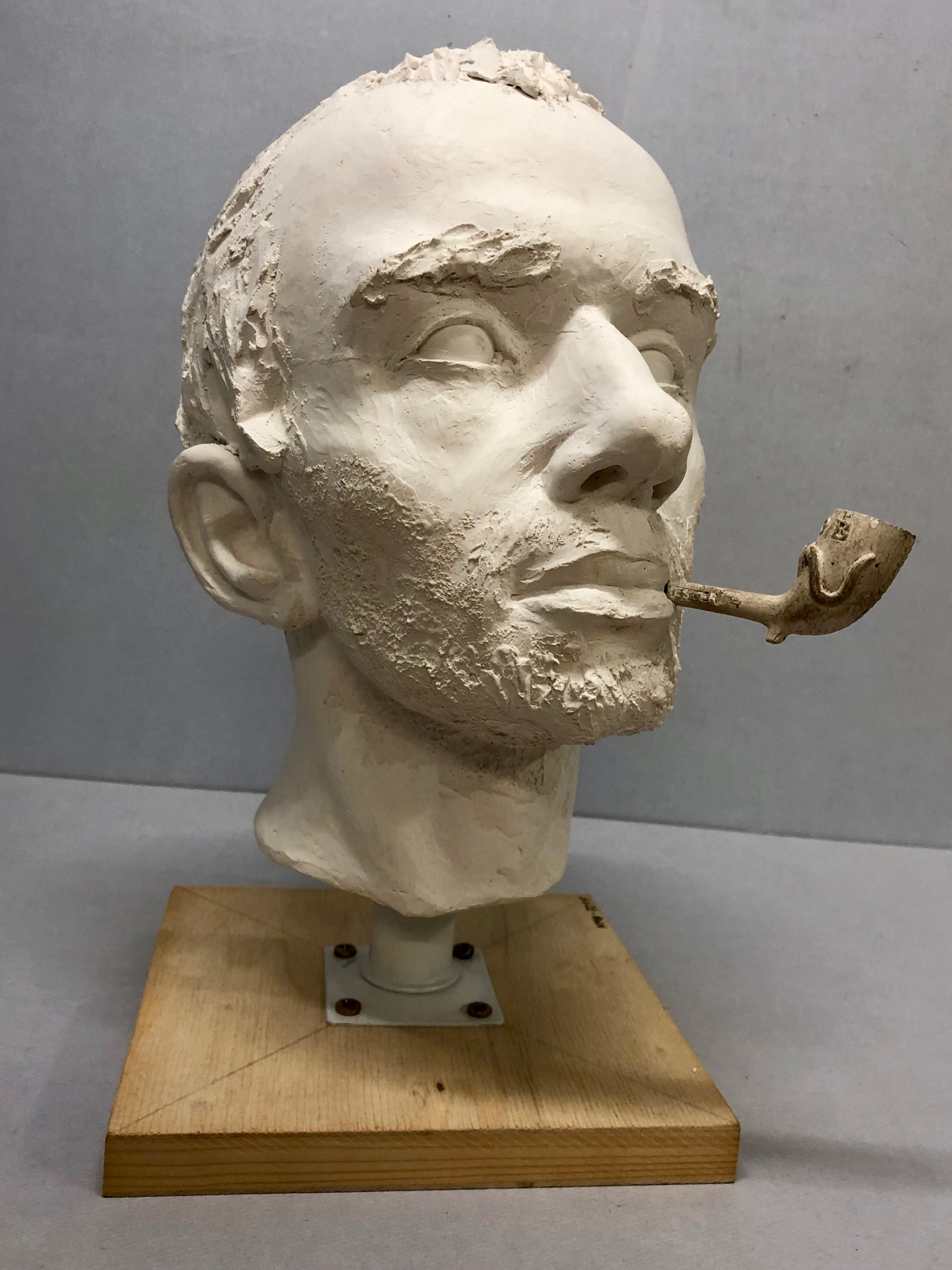
Plastic facial reconstruction

== Facial reconstruction ==
In the year 2001, historian Fabian Link created a facial reconstruction of Theo under the guidance of anthropologist and sculptor Gyula Skultéty. Link portrayed him as a 40-year-old man with wrinkles and a face marked by years of hard work. Later, more detailed investigations into Theo's age of death revealed that he died at the age of 30. With the new information, Gyula Skultéty portrayed Theo as a younger man. The reconstruction thus shows a plausible variant of Theo's appearance at the time of his death.

== New genetic and genealogical research ==
Using newly developed methods, Forensic Genetics in Berlin managed in 2015 to isolate fragments of Theo's nuclear DNA from a bone sample. In this case, the search for descendants had to take place on the male line. Thus, a descendant of another man in question, pan mender Peter Kestenholz, could be tracked down in Liestal. But the analysis of his DNA showed that there was no relationship. Another candidate was removed from the list with certain reservations, leaving ten candidates.

When researching the male line, there is the possibility of so-called milkman's children who interrupt the paternal line with foreign DNA. A genetic comparison of descendants is then no longer possible. Therefore, if there is no proof of kinship in a potential descendant of Theo, the candidate cannot be removed from the candidate list with one hundred percent certainty. A second trail to the top candidate Achilles Itin led to the USA. Here, the contact is still pending; a first attempt failed.

To improve the possibilities of finding Theo's descendants, a whole genome sequencing of Theo was carried out by the University of Potsdam (Institute of biochemistry and biology; evolutionary adaptive genomics) and Forensic Genetics Berlin. The data obtained are uploaded to DNA databases such as GEDmatch which compare about 1 million DNA autosomal markers instead of maternal and paternal lines. The most important statement so far has been that Theo belongs to the exact mitochondrial haplogroup U-3546A, as well as the Y-chromosomal haplogroup R1b-S22194 with the further private mutations BY47236 T and BY126769 G.

If matches are now found between existing gene markers and those of Theo, the people concerned would be contacted. If these people can be shown to have ancestors from Basel, this could lead to the determination of Theo's identity. So it is probably only a matter of time until the mystery of Theo can be solved.

== Further applications of the procedure ==
Such methods are already successfully applied in so-called cold case investigations. Without prior knowledge, in the case of serious crimes, samples of the murderer's DNA can lead to their identification. A sequencing of the genome from the cell nucleus DNA was also carried out on Ötzi.
