= Fryske Rie foar Heraldyk =

Advisory board for heraldry in Friesland, the Netherlands

The Frisian eagle is a common animal in the heraldry of Friesland.

The Fryske Rie foar Heraldyk (The Frisian Heraldry Board) is an advisory committee that provides advice on the coats of arms and flags of the government, the province Friesland, the municipalities, the water boards, the town and village coats of arms and the existing family coats of arms. The Fryske Rie foar Heraldyk is not a government body and has no legal duties or powers.

The Rie is part of the Fryske Akademy in Leeuwarden.
