= International Conference on Minority Languages =

The International Conference on Minority Languages (ICML) is a conference series first held in Glasgow in 1980, focused on lesser-used or minoritized languages. It has taken place periodically since, settling on a biennial schedule in 2001.

The 20th edition of the conference was held in Colombia in June 2025, at the Universidad Externado de Colombia. It was announced that the 2027 edition (ICML XXI) will be held in South Tyrol and hosted by Eurac Research.

== Conference editions and locations ==
As of 2025, the conference has been held 20 times, with just 3 of these occurring in the same area twice - Leeuwarden, Friesland (1989 and 2019), Wales (Cardiff in 1993 and Carmarthen in 2023) and the Basque Country (1999 and 2021, although the latter went online-only).

Edition		Location	Organising Institution/s
I	1980	Glasgow	Association for Scottish Literary Studies, University of Glasgow
II	1983	Turku	Åbo Akademi University
III	1986	Galway	Department of Old and Middle Irish and Celtic Philology, NUI Galway
IV	1989	Leeuwarden	Fryske Academy
V	1993	Cardiff	Department of Celtic Studies, University of Wales
VI	1996	Gdánsk	Kashubian-Pomeranian Association, University of Gdańsk, Adam Mickiewicz University in Poznan
VII	1999	Bilbao	Deputy Ministry for Language Policy of the Basque Government
VIII	2001	Santiago de Compostela	Dirección Xeral de Politica Linguistica, Xunta de Galicia, Conselleriá de Educación e Ordinación Universitaria
IX	2003	Kiruna	Department of Finnish, University of Stockholm
X	2005	Trieste	The Slovene Research Institute (SLORI)
XI	2007	Pécs	Research Institute for Linguistics of the Hungarian Academy of Sciences (HAS), Research Institute for Ethnic and National Minority Studies, Faculty of Political and Legal Sciences of the University of Pécs
XII	2009	Tartu	
XIII	2011	Flensburg/Sønderborg	
XIV	2013	Graz	
XV	2015	Belgrade	Faculty of Philology, University of Belgrade
XVI	2017	Jyväsylä & Närpes	
XVII	2019	Leeuwarden	Mercator European Research Centre on Multilingualism and Language Learning, Fryske Akademy
XVIII	2021	Online	University of the Basque Country
XIX	2023	Carmarthen	University of Wales Trinity Saint David
XX	2025	Bogotá	Universidad Externado de Colombia
XXI	2027	Bozen/Bolzano	Eurac Research

== Academic focus ==
The conference series has always had a multidisciplinary focus, although is largely attended by linguists sociolinguists, and other social sciences. The common point is therefore the focus on language, primarily 'minority' languages although terms such as regional, minoritized, lesser-used, indigenous, are all also used depending on the specific context.

Beyond linguists and sociolinguists, the conference has attended to attract media scholars, legal scholars, political scientists and historians. An example of the multi-disciplinarity of the conference can be seen in the 2023 programme.

== Notable keynote speakers ==
The conference has featured many well-known academics and practitioners in the 20 editions held over 45 years. One of the most renowned was the sociolinguist Joshua Fishman, who spoke at ICML IX in Cardiff, 1993.

The two most recent editions have seen the serving United Nations Special Rapporteur on Minority Issues as one of the keynote speakers, Fernand de Varennes in Carmarthen 2023, then Nicolas Levrat in Bogotá 2025. Carmarthen also saw serving member (and vice-chair) of the Committee of Experts to the European Charter for Regional or Minority Languages, Vesna Crnić-Grotić.

Renowned Welsh scholars/activists, Colin H. Williams and Ned Thomas were both listed as Honorary Presidents at the 2023 conference, speaking as dinner speakers during the official conference dinner.
