= European Bureau for Lesser-Used Languages =

Former non-governmental organisation

The European Bureau for Lesser-Used Languages (EBLUL) was a non-governmental organisation that was set up to promote linguistic diversity and languages. It was founded in 1982 and discontinued in 2010. The organisation had close ties with both the European Parliament and the Council of Europe, and was funded by both the European Commission and local and regional governmental organisations, under the same funding programme as the three Mercator research centres.

Following its establishment in 1982, the European Bureau for Lesser-Used Languages worked to strengthen contacts and develop mutual co-operation between lesser-used language communities. The main goal was to promote linguistic diversity and to support these languages. It acted to facilitate links and communications with the European institutions, the Council of Europe, the OSCE, and UN and UNESCO. It spoke on behalf of Europe's 50 million speakers of regional or minority languages.

EBLUL's operational grant was discontinued by the EU in 2007 despite recommendations from the European Parliament, including the 2003 Ebner Report and the EU's own evaluation conducted by Ernst and Young that the EU should continue to support the organisation. The cut in funding remains controversial because the 2003 Ebner Report a European Parliament legislative report, which has to be implemented by the EU, recommended that EBLUL continue to receive EU funding.

However, with the cut in its core funding, EBLUL was finally closed by a decision of its board of directors on 27 January 2010. The main reason given was that "the funding mechanism of such an organisational model [was] not suitable in current circumstances".

One of the successors of EBLUL was is the European Language Equality Network (ELEN), a European NGO for lesser-used languages. ELEN gathers many former EBLUL members plus additional civil society organisations from across Europe. To date, ELEN represents 44 languages with 60 member organisations in 20 European states.

== Presidents of EBLUL ==
Presidents of EBLUL served in three-year terms, elected by the representatives of the Member State Committees during its general assembly each autumn. According to the Bureau's periodic newsletter, Contact Bulletin, these included:

- John Macarthur (1986-1989)
- Anna Vari Chapalain (1989-1992)
- Helen Ó Murchú (1992-1995)
- Allan Wynne Jones (1995-1998)
- Bojan Brezigar (1998-2004)

== Member State Committees ==
EBLUL consisted of several member state committees, which at the turn of the 1990s consisted of 9 members: Belgium, Denmark, France, Germany, Ireland, Italy, Netherlands, Spain and the United Kingdom. By 2000 this had grown to 13 members, with Austria, Finland, Luxembourg and Sweden joining during the 1990s.

== See also ==
- Euromosaic
- European Charter for Regional or Minority Languages
- Framework Convention for the Protection of National Minorities
- Languages of the European Union
