= Fryske Akademy =

Research institute in the Netherlands

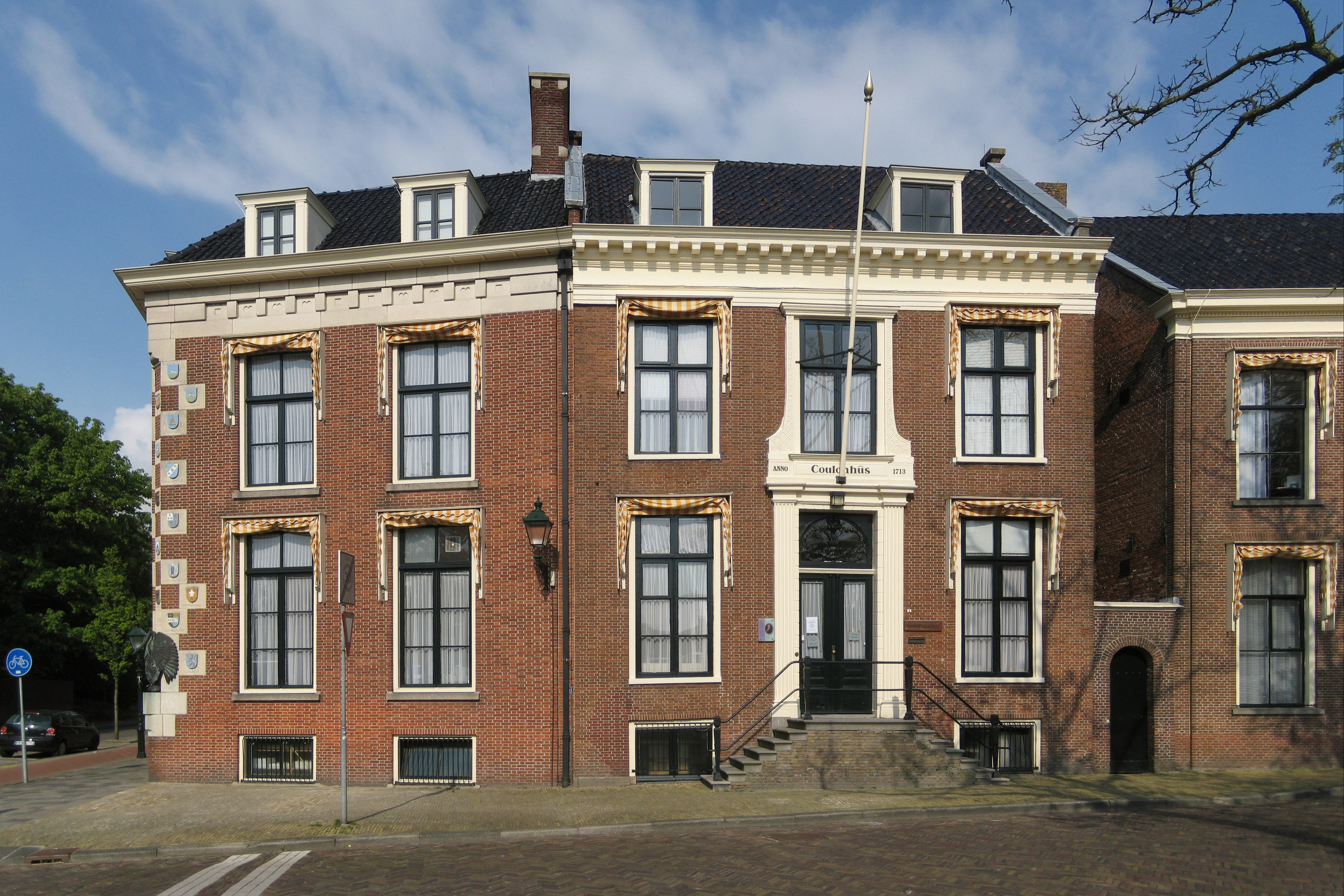
The Coulonhûs in Leeuwarden, main building of the Fryske Akademy

The Fryske Akademy (West Frisian pronunciation: [ˈfriskə akəˈdeːmi]; Frisian for Frisian Academy), founded in 1938, is the scientific centre for research and education concerning Friesland and its people, language and culture, this in its broadest sense. The institution is based in the Coulonhûs and adjacent buildings in Leeuwarden. Together with several other institutes it belongs to the Royal Netherlands Academy of Arts and Sciences (KNAW). It has about 60 employees. In addition, some 300 scientists, amateurs and professionals, are active in the scientific societies hosted by the Fryske Akademy.

== Activities ==
Although the academy's mission includes a wide scope of Friesland-related topics, a great deal of its work focuses particularly on the West Frisian language. It has also done a great deal to regulate the language. The Fryske Akademy publishes the Wurdboek fan de Fryske Taal (Dictionary of the (West) Frisian Language), which serves as the language's principal authority.

It also does a good deal of research regarding the language, history, and culture of the Frisian people. Since its inception, it has published almost 1,000 scientific books, thousands of articles, and a large number of reports on these subjects. A few larger projects include:

- the authoritative dictionary of the West Frisian language, in 25 volumes;
- a West Frisian–English dictionary;
- the Historical Geographical Information System (HISGIS), in which historical registers of real property have been linked to other information like parish registers;
- the Mercator European Research Centre on Multilingualism and Language Learning, which has been financed in part by the Council of Europe, the province of Friesland, and the municipality of Leeuwarden.

== Function in society/social function ==
The social purpose of the Fryske Akademy is, as its statutes have it, the maintenance of societies for the study of Friesland, in which professional scientists and amateur scientists participate. The societies are in part responsible for the large number of books which the Fryske Akademy produces. Very active societies include the Genealogical Society, the Archaeological Society, and the Biological Society. Active or passive participation in these societies is open to everyone paying his dues as a donor of the Fryske Akademy. There are about 3000 donors, each paying a minimum of 25 euros a year.

In addition, the Fryske Akademy carries out contract research for third parties, such as the provincial authorities for whom the Fryske Akademy investigated the quality of language education at primary level. It also contributed to the development of test for speech therapy for West Frisian, which made it possible to assess children's linguistic progress in West Frisian. Until then, only a Dutch test had been used, which gave distorted results in the case of bilingual children.

The academy is also the home of Fryske Rie foar Heraldyk, a heraldic advisory board for the Frisian region.

== History ==
The Fryske Akademy was founded in 1938 with the support of the provincial authorities at the behest of many pro-Frisian politicians and scientists, notably the historian Geart Aeilco Wumkes and the theologian Titus Brandsma. Before the foundation of the Fryske Akademy, two societies were concerned with Frisian science:

- The Frisian society for History, Archaeology, and Linguistics
- The society for the Frisian language and book knowledge

These 19th-century societies regarded themselves as the intellectual heirs to the University of Franeker, which was abolished by Napoleon and which the government of the new Kingdom of the Netherlands failed to reopen. To some extent, the Fryske Akademy considers itself a successor to the University of Franeker.
