= Eurac Research =

Research center in Bolzano, Italy

Coordinates: 46.4943°N 11.3472°E

- Formation: 1992
- Purpose: Applied research
- Headquarters: Bolzano, Italy
- Official language: English, German, Italian
- President: Roland Psenner
- Director: Stephan Ortner
- Subsidiaries: Rome, Vienna, Brussels
- Budget: 47,85 million Euros (49% basic funding from the Province of Bozen, 51% third-party funds)
- Staff: 517
- Website: www.eurac.edu

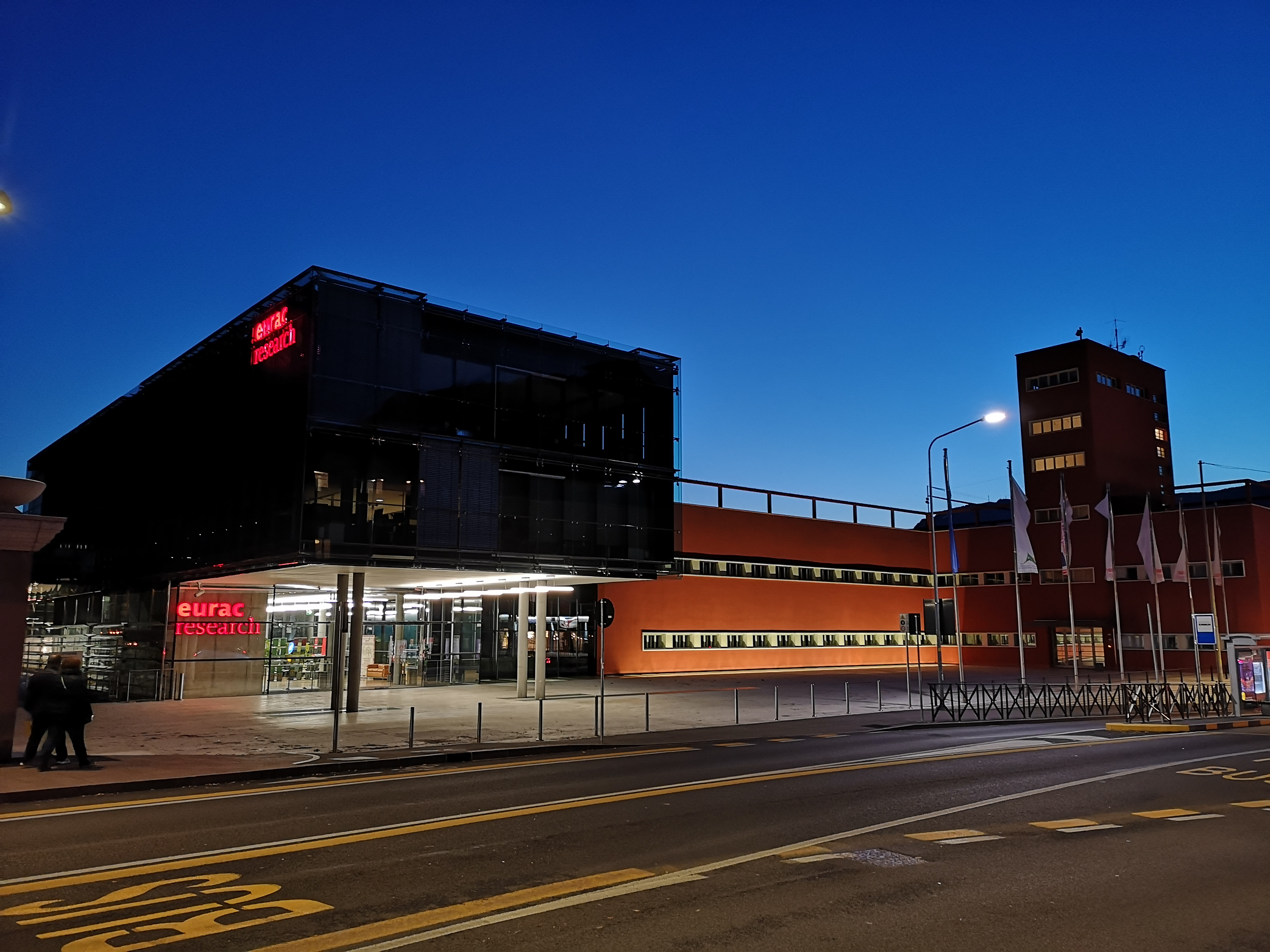
The Eurac Research premises at night

Eurac Research is a private research center headquartered in Bolzano, South Tyrol. The center has eleven institutes and five centers. Eurac Research has more than 800 partners spread across 56 countries. Eurac Research collaborates with international organizations such as the Alpine and Carpathian Conventions, UNEP and UNIDO in the context of sustainable development and energy technology, and also hosts the headquarters of the Permanent Secretariat of the Alpine Convention at its headquarters in Bolzano. Core funding is provided by the autonomous province of South Tyrol, with additional financing coming from membership fees and European project funds.

== Institutes and Center ==
- Institute for Minority Rights
- Institute for Public Management
- Institute for Comparative Federalism
- Institute for Applied Linguistics
- Institute for Alpine Environment
- Institute for Earth Observation
- Institute for Regional Development
- Institute for Renewable Energy
- Institute for Biomedicine
- Institute of Mountain Emergency Medicine
- Institute for Mummy Studies
- Center for Advanced Studies
- Center for Sensing Solutions
- Center for Mountain Safegard Research
- Center for Autonomy
- Center for Climate Change and Transformation
- terraXcube

== Research infrastructure ==
The Ancient DNA Laboratory is used by the Institute for Mummies and the Iceman for molecular analyses of ancient human remains. Researchers study Ötzi the iceman and other mummies from around the world to understand their genomics and study ancient pathogens. The Biomedicine Laboratory of the Center for Biomedicine facilitates epidemiological and biomedical studies. The building contains traditional biomolecular equipment and is also home to a next-generation DNA sequencer. The Solar Technology and Building Envelope Laboratory is located in the industrial area of Bolzano. The laboratory of the Institute for Renewable Energy is a performance testing site for photovoltaic modules, solar thermal systems, as well as traditional and innovative building components that integrate these solar energy systems. Tests are carried out as part of research projects or at the request of companies that produce or market the products. The Satellite Receiving Station is the satellite receiving station of the Institute for Remote Sensing is located on the Horn of Ritten (2,360 meters above sea level). The station receives real-time optical data from three satellites: NASA's Terra, Aqua and Suomi NPP. The institute converts the data into maps in order to observe environmental phenomenon in the region.

== Headquarters ==
Since 2002, Eurac Research has its headquarters in a building known locally as the "ex–GIL", which is situated near the downtown core of Bolzano at the confluence of the Talfer and Eisack rivers. The complex was built in the 1930s on a project by the architects Gino Mansutti and Gino Miozzo to house the Gioventù italiana del littorio (GIL) (English: Italian Youth of the Lictor), a youth movement of the Italian Fascist Party. Following the war and the fall of Mussolini, the building was renamed the "ex-GIL" and over the years has housed a cinema, a supermarket and shop, eventually falling into decline. In the early 1990s a decision was made to renovate the property to accommodate the newly established research center. In 1995, Graz architect Klaus Kada won an international competition for the building's redesign. Kada maintained the heritage of the building by supplementing it with new glassed-in structures; the renovation of the facade brought back its original Pompeian red color. The building uses renewable energy and has absorption chillers for air conditioning.

== History ==
Eurac Research was administratively founded in 1992, but actually started working in 1993. In its early years, twelve employees carried out research in language and law, alpine environment, minorities, and autonomy. The first major project was a feasibility study for the foundation of a new university in Bozen, completed in 1997. Over the years, the scope of research expanded to include management and corporate culture, genetic medicine, and renewable energy. In 2009 the Institute of Mountain Emergency Medicine was opened, followed by the Center for Biomedicine in 2011.

== Public outreach ==
Since 2019, the institution has operated a trilingual, multidisciplinary science blog network titled "Science Blogs." The science blog network features edited articles, written by scientists. Eurac Research also hosts annual science slam events, where researchers from regional universities and institutions present their ongoing work. Additionally, the communication team writes, edits, and publishes Academia, the institution's science magazine. Previous public outreach initiatives included the "Science Café" discussion series.

== International collaboration ==
The center has a long history of international cooperation through joint research projects such as Horizon applications but also combined events such as the Winter School on Federalism and Governance together with two faculties at the University of Innsbruck.

The 21st edition of the International Conference on Minority Languages will be hosted by Eurac Research in June 2027, involving the Center for Autonomy Experience, the Institute for Minority Rights and the Institute for Applied Linguistics.
