= Freedom of speech by country =

A map of nations which have Lèse-majesté laws as of January 2023

Freedom of speech is the concept of the inherent human right to voice one's opinion publicly without fear of censorship or punishment. "Speech" is not limited to public speaking and is generally taken to include other forms of expression. The right is preserved in the United Nations Universal Declaration of Human Rights and is granted formal recognition by the laws of most nations. Nonetheless, the degree to which the right is upheld in practice varies greatly from one nation to another. In many nations, particularly those with authoritarian forms of government, overt government censorship is enforced. Censorship has also been claimed to occur in other forms and there are different approaches to issues such as hate speech, obscenity, and defamation laws.

The following list is partially composed of the respective countries' government claims and does not fully reflect the de facto situation, however many sections of the page do contain information about the validity of the government's claims alongside said claims.

== International law ==
The United Nations Universal Declaration of Human Rights, adopted in 1948, provides, in Article 19, that:

Everyone has the right to freedom of opinion and expression; this right includes freedom to hold opinions without interference and to seek, receive and impart information and ideas through any media and regardless of frontiers.

Technically, as a resolution of the United Nations General Assembly rather than a treaty, it is not legally binding in its entirety on members of the UN. Furthermore, whilst some of its provisions are considered to form part of customary international law, there is dispute as to which. Freedom of speech is granted unambiguous protection in international law by the International Covenant on Civil and Political Rights which is binding on around 150 nations.

In adopting the United Nations Universal Declaration of Human Rights, Ireland, Italy, Luxembourg, Monaco, Australia and the Netherlands insisted on reservations to Article 19 insofar as it might be held to affect their systems of regulating and licensing broadcasting.

== Africa ==
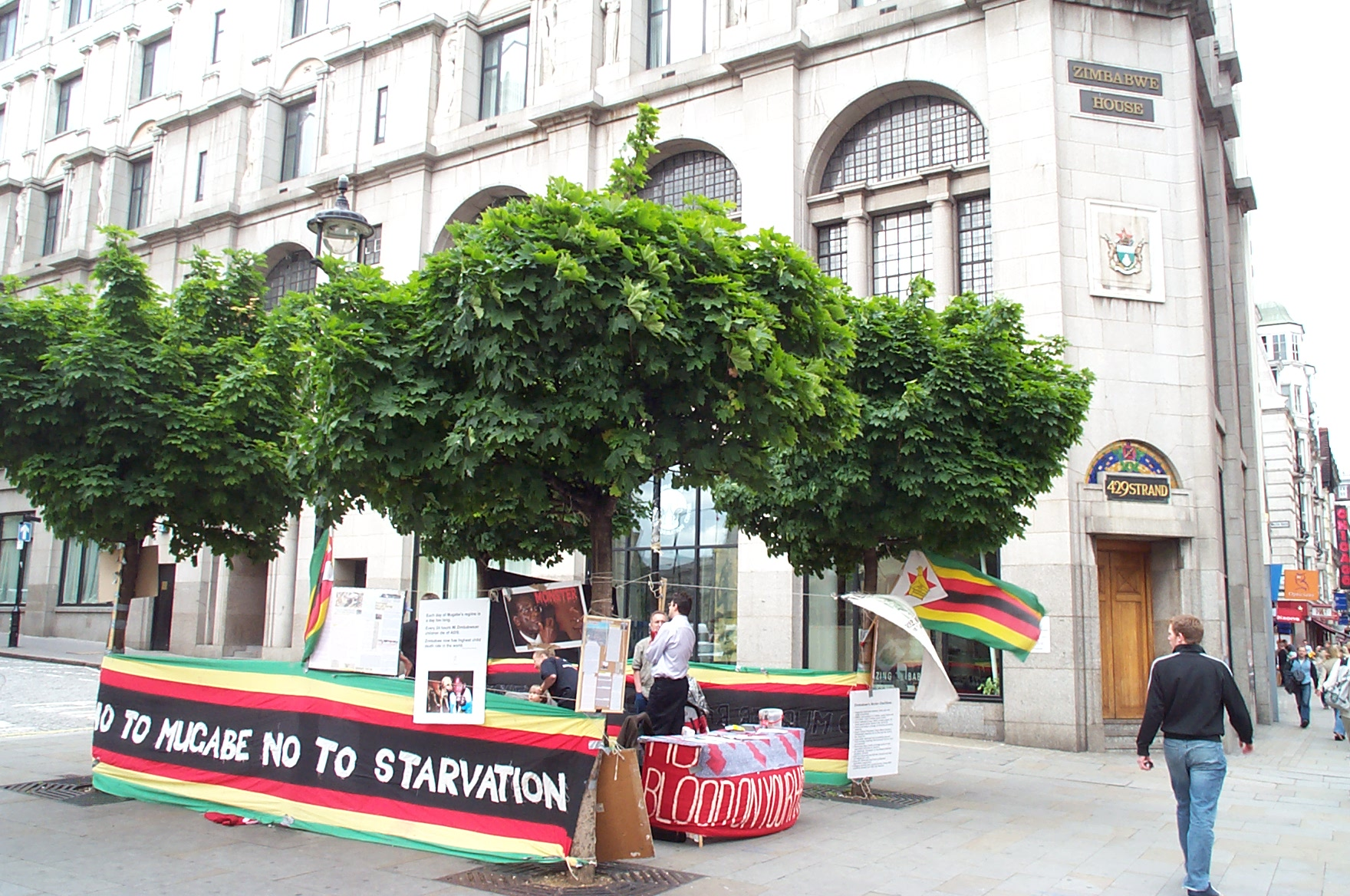
Protesters exercise freedom of speech to hold a vigil in front of the Zimbabwean Embassy in London, 2005.

The majority of African constitutions provide legal protection for freedom of speech, with the extent and enforcement varying from country to country.

=== Senegal ===
Senegal has the most decisive freedom of expression of all African countries. It has many associations active in human rights and freedom of expression. Senegal also has the freedom to practice religion, or not practice a religion.

=== South Africa ===
Under apartheid, freedom of speech was curtailed under apartheid legislation such as the Native Administration Act 1927 and the Suppression of Communism Act, 1950. In light of South Africa's racial and discriminatory history, particularly the Apartheid era, the Constitution of the Republic of South Africa of 1996 precludes expression that is tantamount to the advocacy of hatred based on some listed grounds. Freedom of speech and expression are both protected and limited by a section in the South African Bill of Rights, chapter 2 of the Constitution. Section 16 makes the following provisions:

16. Freedom of expression

1. Everyone has the right to freedom of expression, which includes

a. freedom of the press and other media;

b. freedom to receive or impart information or ideas;

c. freedom of artistic creativity; and

d. academic freedom and freedom of scientific research.

2. The right in subsection (1) does not extend to

a. propaganda for war;

b. incitement of imminent violence; or

c. advocacy of hatred that is based on race, ethnicity, gender or religion, and that constitutes incitement to cause harm.

In 2005, the South African Constitutional Court set an international precedent in the case of Laugh It Off Promotions v South African Breweries when it found that the small culture jamming company Laugh-it-Off's right to freedom of expression outweighs the protection of trademark of the world's second largest brewery. Currently, the South African National Assembly is considering passing a bill aimed at reducing hate speech and hate crimes.

=== Sudan ===
Blasphemy against religion is illegal in Sudan under Blasphemy laws.

=== Tunisia ===
Freedom of speech is a controversial issue and a subject of uncertainty in Tunisia. Artists, journalists, and citizens face harassment when they try to express their ideas freely. There is also a lack of experience and traditions with free speech on the part of Tunisian justice and judges following the Tunisian revolution.

On 13 June 2013 Tunisian Rapper, Alaa Yacoubi (aka "Weld El 15"), was imprisoned and given a two-year jail sentence because his song "El boulisia Kleb" ("Cops Are Dogs") was considered an incitement to violence and hatred. The court judgement was the subject of an appeal and the decision was announced for 2 July 2013, while Alaa Yaacoubi remained in prison.

== Asia ==
Several Asian countries provide formal legal guarantees of freedom of speech to their citizens. These are not, however, implemented in practice in some countries. Barriers to freedom of speech are common and vary drastically between ASEAN countries. They include the use of brutal force in cracking down on bloggers in Burma, Vietnam and Cambodia, application of the law on lèse majesté in Thailand, the use of libel and internal security laws in Singapore and Malaysia, and the killing of journalists in the Philippines. According to Amnesty International, freedom of expression is significantly limited in China and North Korea. Freedom of speech has improved in Myanmar in recent years, but significant challenges remain. There is no clear correlation between legal and constitutional guarantees of freedom of speech and actual practices among Asian nations.

=== Bangladesh ===
Under chapter III of the Fundamental rights in Bangladesh. The Bangladesh constitution ostensibly guarantees freedom of speech to every citizen according to PART III of the Laws in Bangladesh. Bangladesh constitution states that:

All the citizens shall have the following right

- 39. (1) Freedom of thought and conscience

is guaranteed.

- (2) Subject to any reasonable restrictions

imposed by law in the interests of the security of the State, friendly relations with foreign states, public order, decency or morality, or in relation to contempt of court, defamation or incitement to an offence–

- (a) the right of every citizen to freedom of

speech and expression; and

- (b) freedom of the press, are guaranteed.

=== Cambodia ===
Violations of freedom of expression, including lack of access to the media, are endemic. More recently, what was decried as a campaign against freedom of expression marked an accelerating backward slide in Cambodia's efforts to promote human rights values. There are severe restrictions on freedom of assembly, granted by the Cambodian Constitution, is also being perceived by local organizations as a deliberate campaign to repress Cambodian civil society to grow and voice their concern. On 14 March 2018, the UN expert on the human rights situation in Cambodia Professor Rhona Smith of the United Kingdom, "expressed serious concerns about restrictions on the media, freedom of expression and political participation ahead of a national election in July, calling on the Government to choose the path of human rights." She urged the authorities to lift the ban on 118 politicians participating in politics.

Journalists in Cambodia are increasingly being subjected to various forms of harassment and pressure, as well as violence, a report published on August 3, 2022, by the UN Human Rights Office said, amid growing restrictions on civic space and press freedoms in the country. Sixty-five journalists were interviewed and surveyed as part of the report.

Soy Sros, a Cambodian woman who makes bags for international fashion brands like Michael Kors and Kate Spade, worked at the Superl factory in Kampong Speu Province. On 4 April 2020, Soy was sent to prison for a Facebook post in which she wrote about her concerns that workers from her factory would be laid off in the midst of the coronavirus pandemic. She was interrogated by several police for more than 48 hours. "There were several policemen in the interrogation room, and they asked me if I wanted attention, or to be famous, whether I was trying to incite somebody," Soy said. "They called me names, offended my dignity as a woman."

Soon after, Soy was thrown into the Kampong Speu prison. Superl's initial charges against Soy claimed that she had posted fake news and defamed the factory. But the court that was looking into her case also charged her with two criminal offenses, provocation and discrimination. If Soy were found guilty, she faced up to three years in prison and a fine of up to six million riels (approximately US$1,500). She was jailed for two months.

In 2020, Human Rights Watch raised concerns that the Cambodian government had used the 2020-2021 COVID-19 pandemic to restrict fundamental liberties, including granting laws banning the distribution of information, establishing surveillance of telecommunications, and total control of the media.

=== China ===
According to Article 35 of the Constitution of China:

English:- Citizens of the People's Republic of China enjoy freedom of speech, of the press, of assembly, of association, of procession and of demonstration.
Chinese: 中华人民共和国公民有言论、出版、集会、结社、示威的自由。

The Chinese government maintains that "freedom of speech is not the same as free speech". In this view, when exercising their right to freedom of speech, citizens "must not disrupt social order, violate the Constitution and laws, or harm the interests of the state, society, or collectives, or the legitimate freedoms and rights of other citizens". There is heavy government involvement in the media, with many of the largest media organizations being run by and/or affiliated with the ruling Chinese Communist Party (CCP). References to liberal democracy, references to the Republic of China (Taiwan) as an independent country, the Tiananmen Square protests of 1989, separatist movements such as ones in Xinjiang and Tibet, the 2014 Hong Kong protests, certain religious organizations such as Falun Gong, and anything questioning the legitimacy of the CCP are banned from use in public and blocked on the Internet. Web portals, including Microsoft's MSN, have come under criticism.

Several social networking sites, such as Twitter, Facebook, and Snapchat, are banned as a whole, while books and foreign films are subject to active censorship. The biggest search engine, Google, initially redirected its mainland search traffic to Hong Kong in 2010 rather than comply with Chinese censorship requirements. However, the Chinese government fully blocked access to all remaining Google services in June 2014, on the 25th anniversary of the Tiananmen Square protests. In a move to attract foreign investment, however, Beijing has lifted bans on foreign websites within the Shanghai Free-Trade Zone. The state's censorship tactics range from relatively moderate ways of using monitoring systems and firewalls to jailing journalists, bloggers, and activists, as can be seen from the case of Chinese activist Liu Xiaobo. Although China's constitution deals with citizens' freedom of speech, the language has been vague, thus giving more space for the government's arbitrary and unilateral judgements. For example, according to the Article 5 of the "Computer Information Network and Internet Security, Protection and Management Regulations," issued by the Ministry of Public Safety in 1997, it states:

No unit or individual may use the Internet to create, replicate, retrieve, or transmit the following kinds of information:

1. Inciting to resist or violate the Constitution or laws or the implementation of administrative regulations;
2. Inciting to overthrow the government or the socialist system;
3. Inciting division of the country, harming national unification;
4. Inciting hatred or discrimination among nationalists or harming the unity of the nationalities;
5. Making falsehoods or distorting the truth, spreading rumours, destroying the order of society;
6. Promoting feudal superstitions, sexually suggestive material, gambling, violence, murder;
7. Engaging in terrorism or inciting others to criminal activity; openly insulting other people or distorting the truth to slander people;
8. Injuring the reputation of state organs;
9. Other activities against the Constitution, laws or administrative regulations.

In January 2013, hundreds of protesters gathered in front of the headquarters of Southern Weekly after Guangdong's Propaganda Department chief, Tuo Zhen, allegedly rewrote the newspaper's New Year's editorial entitled "China's Dream/ The Dream of Constitution (中国梦，宪政梦)," which called for constitutional reform to better guarantee individual citizens' rights. This is seen, though small, as a victory for press freedom in China; it was the largest and most open protest for free speech in China in decades and the result itself favoured the press, the Guangdong propaganda ministry agreeing not to directly intervene in editorial decisions.

==== Hong Kong ====
Freedom of speech is, on paper, granted in the Hong Kong Special Administrative Region under "Chapter III: Fundamental Rights and Duties of the Residents" (第三章: 居民的基本權利和義務) of the Hong Kong Basic Law:

Article 27: Hong Kong residents shall have freedom of speech, of the press and of publication; freedom of association, of assembly, of procession and of demonstration; and the right and freedom to form and join trade unions, and to strike.
Article 30: The freedom and privacy of communication of Hong Kong residents shall be protected by law. No department or individual may, on any grounds, infringe upon the freedom and privacy of communication of residents except that the relevant authorities may inspect communication in accordance with legal procedures to meet the needs of public security or of investigation into criminal offences.

However, many residents of Hong Kong have been arrested under the "Law of the People's Republic of China on Safeguarding National Security in the Hong Kong Special Administrative Region" including pro-democracy politicians, activists and protestors. In 2021, pro-democracy newspaper, Apple Daily had $18 million (HKD) of its assets frozen and its editor-in-chief and four other executives arrested for publishing more than 30 articles calling on countries to impose sanctions on Hong Kong and mainland China. In 2021, the Tiananmen Square Museum was accused of 'inciting subversion' and raided by police who removed its exhibits and arrested four members of the group running the museum. Furthermore, in 2024, the "Safeguarding National Security Ordinance" was passed, implementing harsh punishments for actions including but not limited to "inciting hatred against China’s Communist Party leadership" and “inciting disaffection of public officers."

=== India ===
The Indian Constitution guarantees freedom of speech to every citizen, but itself allows significant restrictions. In India, citizens are theoretically free to criticize government, politics, politicians, bureaucracy and policies, but there have been many cases of arrests of those who do so. There have been landmark cases in the Indian Supreme Court that have affirmed the nation's policy of allowing free press and freedom of expression to every citizen, with other cases in which the Court has upheld restrictions on freedom of speech and of the press. Article 19 of the Indian constitution states that:

All citizens shall have the right —

1. to freedom of speech and expression;
2. to assemble peaceably and without arms;
3. to form associations or unions;
4. to move freely throughout the territory of India;
5. to reside and settle in any part of the territory of India; and
6. to practise any profession, or to carry on any occupation, trade or business.

These rights are limited so as not to affect:

- The integrity of India
- The security of the State
- Friendly relations with foreign States
- Public order
- Decency or morality
- Contempt of court
- Defamation or incitement to an offence

Freedom of speech is restricted by the National Security Act of 1980 and UAPA, and in the past, by the Prevention of Terrorism Ordinance (POTO) of 2001, the Terrorist and Disruptive Activities (Prevention) Act (TADA) from 1985 to 1995, and similar measures. Freedom of speech is also restricted by Section 124A of the Indian Penal Code, 1860 which deals with sedition and makes any speech or expression which brings contempt towards government punishable by imprisonment extending from three years to life. In 1962 the Supreme Court of India held this section to be constitutionally valid in the case Kedar Nath Singh vs State of Bihar.

=== Indonesia ===
Blasphemy against religion is illegal in Indonesia under Chapter 156a of the Penal Code (KUHP).

=== Iran ===
Blasphemy against Islam is illegal in Iran.

According to the Constitution of the Islamic Republic of Iran Chapter 3 Article 27 Public gatherings and marches are allowed so long as the participants do not carry arms and are not in violation of the fundamental principles of Islam.

According to the Press Freedom Index for 2007, Iran ranked 166th out of 169 nations. Only three other countries – Eritrea, North Korea, and Turkmenistan - had more restrictions on news media freedom than Iran. The government of Ali Khamenei and the Supreme National Security Council imprisoned 50 journalists in 2007 and all but eliminated press freedom. Reporters Without Borders (RWB) has dubbed Iran the "Middle East's biggest prison for journalists."

On September 8, 2020, Reporters Without Borders expressed concern about the continuing detention and repression of journalists in Iran, and warned for the journalists and reporters who have been arrested for their activities and subjected to harassment. "The Human Rights Council must take more serious action to protect and defend journalists," said an official.

=== Israel ===
The Supreme Court of Israel (Levi v. Southern District Police Commander) ruled that:

The right of demonstration and procession is a fundamental human right in Israel. It is recognized along with free speech, or emanating therefrom - as belonging to the freedoms that characterize Israel as a democratic state.

The Democracy Index of 2017 includes a freedom of speech and media ranking in which Israel scores a shared 11th place out of 167 countries in the world (9 out of 10 points). According to the 2016 US Department of State report on Israel, "[t]he law generally provides for freedom of speech, including for members of the press, and the government generally respected these rights. An independent press, an effective judiciary, and a functioning democratic political system combined to promote freedom of speech and of the press". Incitement to discrimination (including incitement to boycott an entity solely based on its affiliation with Israel) (Note: On 11 July 2011, the Knesset passed a law making it a civil offence to publicly call for a boycott against Israel, defined as "deliberately avoiding economic, cultural or academic ties with another person or another factor only because of his ties with the State of Israel, one of its institutions or an area under its control, in such a way that may cause economic, cultural or academic damage".) and slander are civil offences, in which those affected by them can launch lawsuits. Incitement to violence is a criminal offence, which can result in a prison sentence.

Activists claim that since the outbreak of the Gaza war, there has been a climate of fear in Israel threatening freedom of speech. On 5 November 2023, CNN reported that "dozens" of Palestinian residents and Arab Israelis were arrested in Israel for expressions of solidarity with the civilian population of Gaza, sharing Quran verses, or expressing "any support for the Palestinian people".

=== Japan ===
The late Edo government which launched the Boshin War (28 April 1868) once banned all newspapers other than the papers of foreign presses, until the new government allowed to publish Japanese newspaper in 27 Jan 1869 again. Since 8 February, however, it introduced the Shinbunshi Ingyo Jorei (i.e. press Law) to censor all newspapers and books (except of foreign publishers). The censorship continued until Japan was defeated in the WWII in 1945. During the Occupation of Japan by the Allies (2 September 1945 - 28 April 1952), the Supreme Commander for the Allied Powers ordered Japan, as its Directive (SCAPIN), such as the Press Code, the Radio Code for Japan, along with the Freedom of Press and Speech(SCAPIN-16). The General Headquarters also sensored all codes as many up to the rules of the Supreme Court of Justice in English translation as the justice system has been corrupted for centuries in Japan (Note: Shotoku Taishi mentioned of the judicial corruption in the seventeen-article constitution in A. D. 604.)..

Freedom of speech is guaranteed by Chapter III, Article 21 of the Japanese constitution. There are few exemptions to this right and a very broad spectrum of opinion is tolerated by the media and authorities.

Article 21:

Freedom of assembly and association as well as speech, press and all other forms of expression are guaranteed. (集会、結社及び言論、出版その他一切の表現の自由は、これを保障する。)
No censorship shall be maintained, nor shall the secrecy of any means of communication be violated. (検閲は、これをしてはならない。通信の秘密は、これを侵してはならない。)

On the other hand, the first chief of the newly established Supreme Court of Japan and the commissioner of the Japanese public broadcaster NHK was chosen from the insurance industry member that had controlled Japanese major opinions. Also, the press reporters' Kisha club remained and excluded foreign press from all press conferences until 2004. In 2017, UN Special Rapporteur David Kaye raised serious concerns about threats to media independence and freedom of expression in Japan, for the lack of measures for cross ownership, each 5 major broadcasters manage TV and radio broadcasting and newspaper that often causes uniform opinion. In 2021, it was revealed that a company Dappi had their system to manipulate public opinion and had falsely spread fake news.

=== Malaysia ===
In May 2008, the Prime Minister of Malaysia Datuk Seri Abdullah Ahmad Badawi put forward a headline "Media should practice voluntary self-censorship", saying there is no such thing as unlimited freedom and the media should not be abashed of "voluntary self-censorship" to respect cultural norms, different societies hold different values and while it might be acceptable in secular countries to depict a caricature of Muhammad, it was clearly not the case here. "It is not a moral or media sin to respect prophets". He said the government also wanted the media not to undermine racial and religious harmony to the extent that it could threaten national security and public order. "I do not see these laws as curbs on freedom. Rather, they are essential for a healthy society."

The authorities in Malaysia can prosecute users of media for their publications. Such prosecution is on the basis of Section 233 of the Communications and Multimedia Act 1998, for improper use of network facilities. In March 2019, a 22-year old Malaysian was sentenced to 10 years in prison on the grounds of Section 233 of the act. The Malaysian man was sentenced after pleading guilty for insulting Islam and the Islamic prophet Muhammed on his Facebook page.

=== North Korea ===
Freedom of speech is theoretically guaranteed in North Korea in Article 67 of the Constitution of North Korea which states "Citizens are guaranteed freedom of speech, of the press, of assembly, demonstration and association." However, North Korea is generally regarded as one of the most censored countries on earth.

=== Pakistan ===
In its 2010 Freedom of the Press Survey, Freedom House ranked Pakistan 134th out of 196 countries. Pakistan's score was 61 on a scale from 1 (most free) to 100 (least free), which earned a status of "not free". The OpenNet Initiative listed Internet filtering in Pakistan as substantial in the social and conflict/security areas, as selective in the Internet tools area, and as suspected in the political area in December 2010.

Though Articles 19 of the Constitution of Pakistan guarantees freedom of speech and expression, and freedom of the press with certain restrictions. However, in practice, the freedom of speech is restricted through censorship of media as well as censorship of the Internet. In Pakistan, several media forms have been banned either temporarily or permanently - These include YouTube, Flickr, Facebook, Telegram, WhatsApp, and other social networking sites, apart from encyclopaedias such as Wikipedia, which also faced bans.

Blasphemy against religion is illegal in Pakistan. Defaming Muhammad under § 295-C of the Blasphemy law in Pakistan requires a death sentence.

Pakistani authorities impose severe restrictions on the freedom of peaceful assembly, targeting critics, political opponents, and resorting to the arrest and detention of individuals. They also use force to disband protests and have subjected journalists and others to physical assault.

=== Philippines ===
Article III Section 4 of the 1987 Constitution of the Philippines specifies that no law shall be passed abridging the freedom of speech or of expression. However, some laws limit this freedom, for example:

- Certain sections of the Flag and Heraldic Code require particular expressions and prohibit other expressions.
- Title thirteen of the Revised Penal Code of the Philippines criminalizes libel and slander by act or deed (slander by deed is defined as "any act ... which shall cast dishonor, discredit or contempt upon another person."), providing penalties of fine or imprisonment. In 2012, acting on a complaint by an imprisoned broadcaster who dramatised a newspaper account reporting that a particular politician was seen running naked in a hotel when caught in bed by the husband of the woman with whom he was said to have spent the night, the United Nations Commission on Human Rights ruled that the criminalization of libel violates freedom of expression and is inconsistent with Article 19 of the International Covenant on Civil and Political Rights, commenting that "Defamations laws should not ... stifle freedom of expression" and that "Penal defamation laws should include defense of truth."
- Blasphemy against decency and good customs is an offense which is punishable by a prison term, a fine, or both. Other offenses against decency and good customs include: public displays or exhibitions which glorify criminals or condone crimes, serve no other purpose but to satisfy the market for violence, lust or pornography, offend any race or religion, tend to abet traffic in and use of prohibited drugs, and are contrary to law, public order, morals, and good customs, established policies, lawful orders, decrees and edicts; publishing or selling obscene literature; selling, giving away, or exhibiting films, prints, engravings, sculpture or literature which are offensive to morals; publicly expounding or proclaiming doctrines openly contrary to public morals; and highly scandalous conduct not expressly falling within any other article of the code.

=== Saudi Arabia ===
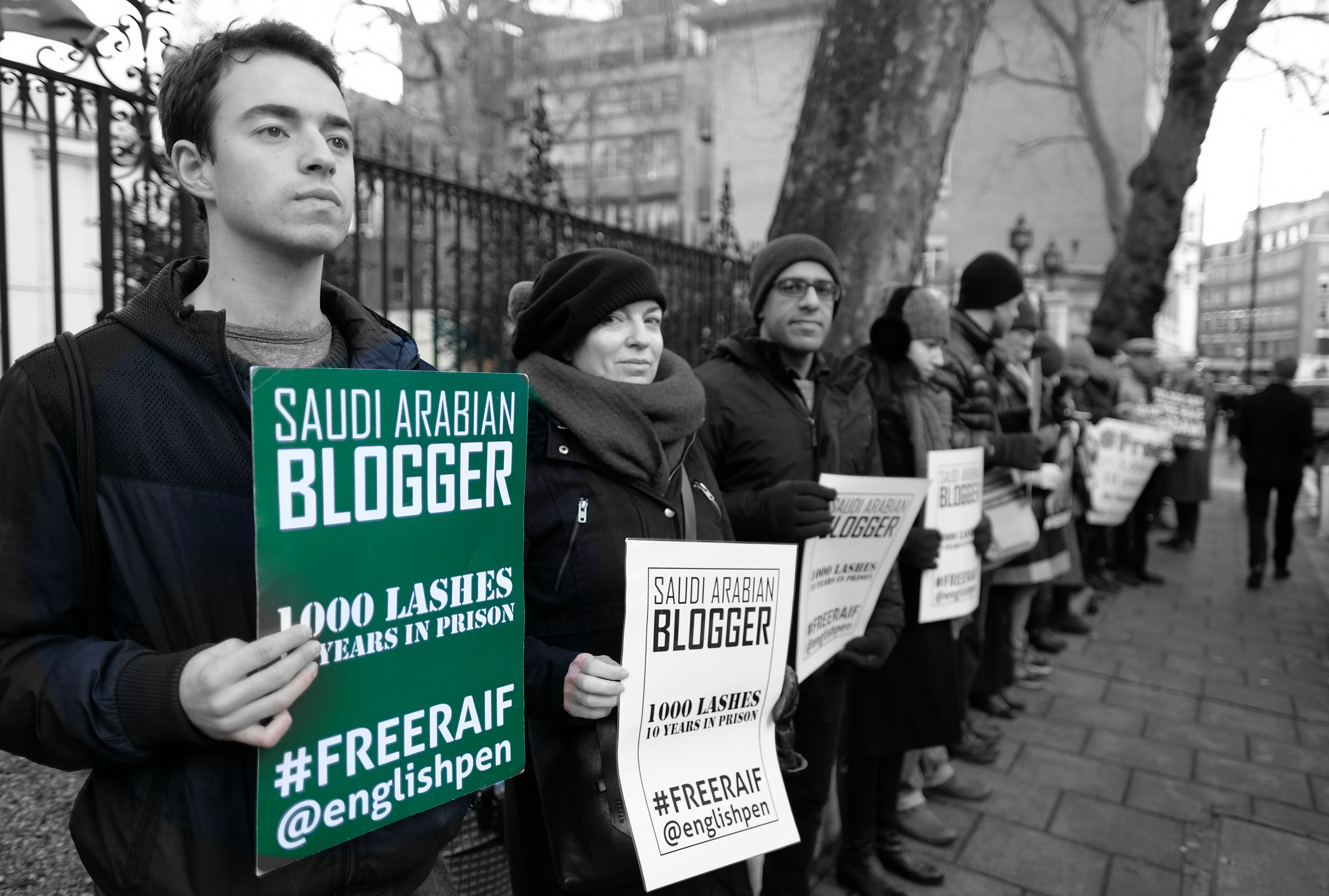
A protest outside the Saudi Arabian Embassy in London against detention of Saudi blogger Raif Badawi, 2017

Blasphemy against Islam is illegal in Saudi Arabia, under punishment of death.

=== South Korea ===
The South Korean constitution guarantees freedom of speech, press, petition and assembly for its nationals. However, behaviors or speeches in favor of the North Korean regime or communism can be punished by the National Security Law, though in recent years prosecutions under this law have been rare. South Korea is also known as the country in Asia with the most freedom of press.

There is a strict election law that takes effect a few months before elections which prohibits most speech that either supports or criticizes a particular candidate or party. One can be prosecuted for political parodies and even for wearing a particular color (usually the color of a party).

Some activists send leaflets by balloons to North Korea. The police has intervened and stopped some of the balloon releases in fear that North Korea may retaliate violently. This has resulted in critical discussion on freedom of expression and its limits due to safety concerns. Officially, the South Korean government insists on activists' right to freedom of expression.

=== Taiwan ===
The Constitution of the Republic of China (commonly known as Taiwan) guarantees freedom of speech, teaching, writing, publishing, assembly and association for its nationals under Articles 11 and 14. These rights were suspended under martial law and Article 100 of the Criminal Code, which were lifted and abolished on July 15, 1987, and March 2, 1991, respectively. In 2018, Reporters Without Borders ranked Taiwan 42nd in the world, citing concerns about media independence due to economic pressure from China.

=== Thailand ===
While the Thai constitution provides for freedom of expression, by law the government may restrict freedom of expression to preserve national security, maintain public order, preserve the rights of others, protect public morals, and prevent insults to Buddhism. The lese-majeste law makes it a crime, punishable by up to 15 years' imprisonment for each offense, to criticize, insult, or threaten the king, queen, royal heir apparent, or regent. Defamation is a criminal offense and parties that criticize the government or related businesses may be sued, setting the stage for self-censorship.

Censorship expanded considerably starting in 2003 during the Thaksin Shinawatra administration and after the 2006 military coup. Prosecutions for lese-majeste offenses increased significantly starting in 2006. Journalists are generally free to comment on government activities and institutions without fear of official reprisal, but they occasionally practice self-censorship, particularly with regard to the monarchy and national security. Broadcast media are subject to government censorship, both directly and indirectly, and self-censorship is evident. Under the Emergency Decree in the three southernmost provinces, the government may restrict print and broadcast media, online news, and social media networks there. The Computer Crime Act of 2007 allows for computer crime punishments that have committed far fewer offences, potentially giving the Government even more control over free speech. However, this amended act is currently awaiting the approval of His Majesty King Maha Vajiralongkorn Bodindradebayavarangkun

Thailand practices selective Internet filtering in the political, social, and Internet tools areas, with no evidence of filtering in the conflict/security area in 2011. Thailand is on Reporters Without Borders list of countries under surveillance in 2011 and is listed as "Not Free" in the Freedom on the Net 2011 report by Freedom House, which cites substantial political censorship and the arrest of bloggers and other online users.

On 25 March 2020, Human Rights Watch demanded that Thai authorities end its use of laws against fake news against people criticizing the government's handling of COVID-19 outbreak in the country. A state of emergency set into effect on the 26 March 2020 highlighted concerns on increased repression of the freedom of speech.

=== Turkey ===
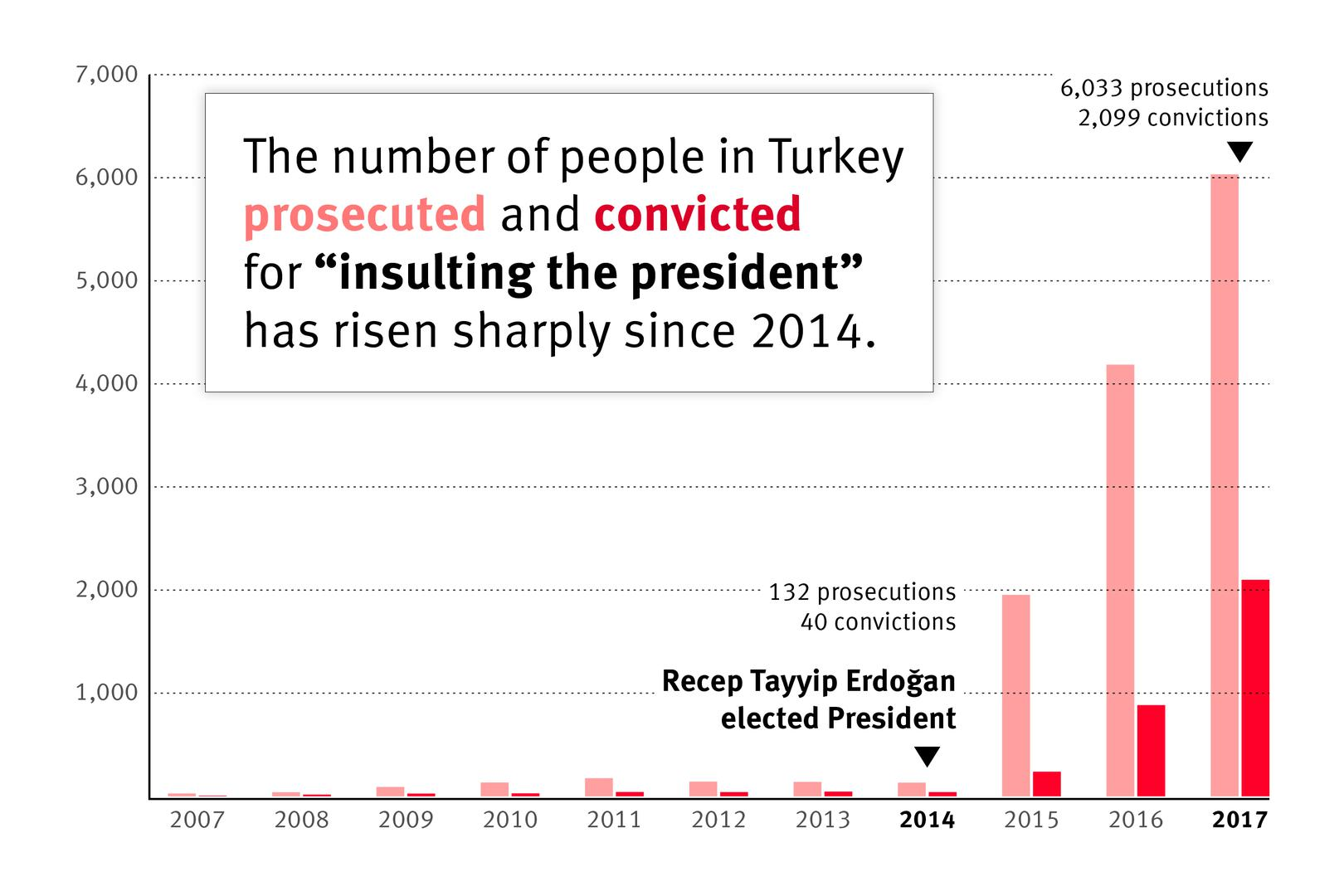
Article 299's prosecution have surged during Erdogan's presidency.

Article 299 of the Turkish Penal Code deems it illegal to "Insult the President of Turkey". A person who is sentenced for a violation of this article can be sentenced to a prison term between one and four years and if the violation was made in public the verdict can be elevated by a sixth. Prosecutions often target critics of the government, independent journalists, and political cartoonists. Between 2014 and 2019, 128,872 investigations were launched for this offense and prosecutors opened 27,717 criminal cases.

=== United Arab Emirates ===
In the United Arab Emirates (UAE), it is a crime to use a computer network to "damage the national unity or social peace". The law has been used to convict people for criticising state security investigations on Twitter. The Gulf Centre for Human Rights (GCHR) and Human Rights Watch reported in December 2020 of the jailed human rights defender, Ahmed Mansoor's deteriorating health condition following his indefinite solitary confinement in the al-Sadr prison of UAE, lacking basic necessities and medication. Mansoor sits on the advisory board of both the rights organizations. The authorities of the United Arab Emirates were urged to take the situation into consideration on immediate notice.

Human rights organizations from around the world undersigned a letter sent to the winners of the Sheikh Zayed Book Award on 10 May 2021, urging them to decline the accolade. In addition to the award, the letter also urged the winners to withdraw their names from a forthcoming event to be hosted in UAE – Abu Dhabi International Book Fair. The winners included Dar Al Jadeed, Iman Mersal, Dr Saeed El-Masry, Khelil Gouia, Dr Asma bint Muqbel bin Awad Al-Ahmadi, Michael Cooperson, Tahera Qutbuddin and Mizouni Bannani. The letter was written soon after German philosopher Jürgen Habermas declined his award, citing the reason as the awarding institution's close ties with the ongoing political system of Abu Dhabi, UAE. The rights groups wrote in their letter that the award represented UAE's PR strategy of investing in cultural events while hiding the oppression of peaceful dissident voices.

== Oceania ==
=== Australia ===
Australia does not have explicit freedom of speech in any constitutional or statutory declaration of rights, with the exception of political speech which is protected from criminal prosecution at common law per Australian Capital Television Pty Ltd v Commonwealth. There is however an implied freedom of speech that was recognised in Lange v Australian Broadcasting Corporation.

In 1992 the High Court of Australia judged in the case of Australian Capital Television Pty Ltd v Commonwealth that the Australian Constitution, by providing for a system of representative and responsible government, implied the protection of political communication as an essential element of that system. This freedom of political communication is not a broad freedom of speech as in other countries, but rather a freedom that only protects political free speech. This freedom of political free speech is a shield against government prosecution, not a shield against private prosecution (civil law). It is also less a causal mechanism in itself, rather than simply a boundary which can be adjudged to be breached. Despite the court's ruling, however, not all political speech appears to be protected in Australia and several laws criminalise forms of speech that would be protected in republic countries such as the United States.

In 1996, Albert Langer was imprisoned for advocating that voters fill out their ballot papers in a way that was invalid. Amnesty International declared Langer to be a prisoner of conscience. The section which outlawed Langer from encouraging people to vote this way has since been repealed and the law now says only that it is an offence to print or publish material which may deceive or mislead a voter.

The Howard government expanded sedition law as part of the war on terror. Media Watch ran a series on the amendments on ABC television.

In 2003, CSIRO senior scientist Graeme Pearman was reprimanded and encouraged to resign after he spoke out on global warming. The Howard government was accused of limiting the speech of Pearman and other scientists.

In 2010, journalist Andrew Bolt was sued in the Federal Court over two posts on his Herald Sun blog in 2009. Bolt was found to have contravened the Racial Discrimination Act 1975 (Cth) in 2011 following comments regarded to be representative of a "eugenic" approach to aboriginal identity. This prompted the federal government to propose changes to the Racial Discrimination Act but this has been met with stiff resistance.

In 2014 the Supreme Court of Victoria issued a blanket media gag order on the reporting of a high-profile international corruption case. The gag order prevented the publishing of articles regarding bribes presented to high-ranking officials of Malaysia, Indonesia and Vietnam by senior executives of the Reserve Bank of Australia in order to secure the adoption of the Australian invented and produced polymer banknote technology.

As of 2025, Gerard Rennick People First, Pauline Hanson's One Nation and the Libertarian Party have proposed policies to hold a referendum on enshrining freedom of speech in the Australian Constitution.

=== New Zealand ===
The right to freedom of speech is not explicitly protected by common law in New Zealand, but is encompassed in various doctrines aimed at protecting free speech. An independent press, an effective judiciary, and a functioning democratic political system combine to ensure a degree of freedom of speech and of the press. In particular, freedom of expression is preserved as a matter of policy in section 14 of the New Zealand Bill of Rights Act 1990, which states that:

"Everyone has the right to freedom of expression, including the freedom to seek, receive, and impart information and opinions of any kind in any form."

This provision reflects the more detailed one in Article 19 of the International Covenant on Civil and Political Rights. The significance of this right and its importance to democracy has been emphasised by the New Zealand courts. It has been described as the primary right without which the rule of law cannot effectively operate. According to courts, the right is not only the cornerstone of democracy; it also guarantees the self-fulfilment of its members by advancing knowledge and revealing truth. As such, the right has been given a wide interpretation. The Court of Appeal has said that section 14 is "as wide as human thought and imagination". Freedom of expression embraces free speech, a free press, transmission and receipt of ideas and information, freedom of expression in art, and the right to silence. The right to seek access to official records is also seen as part of the right to freedom of expression, as provided for in the Official Information Act 1982.

Despite those policy statements in New Zealand statutes and caselaw, there remains significant censorship in New Zealand beyond that of most developed countries, and criminal suspects have often have a right to name suppression. Furthermore, defamation law is much more plaintiff-friendly than in the United States.

== Europe ==
=== Council of Europe ===
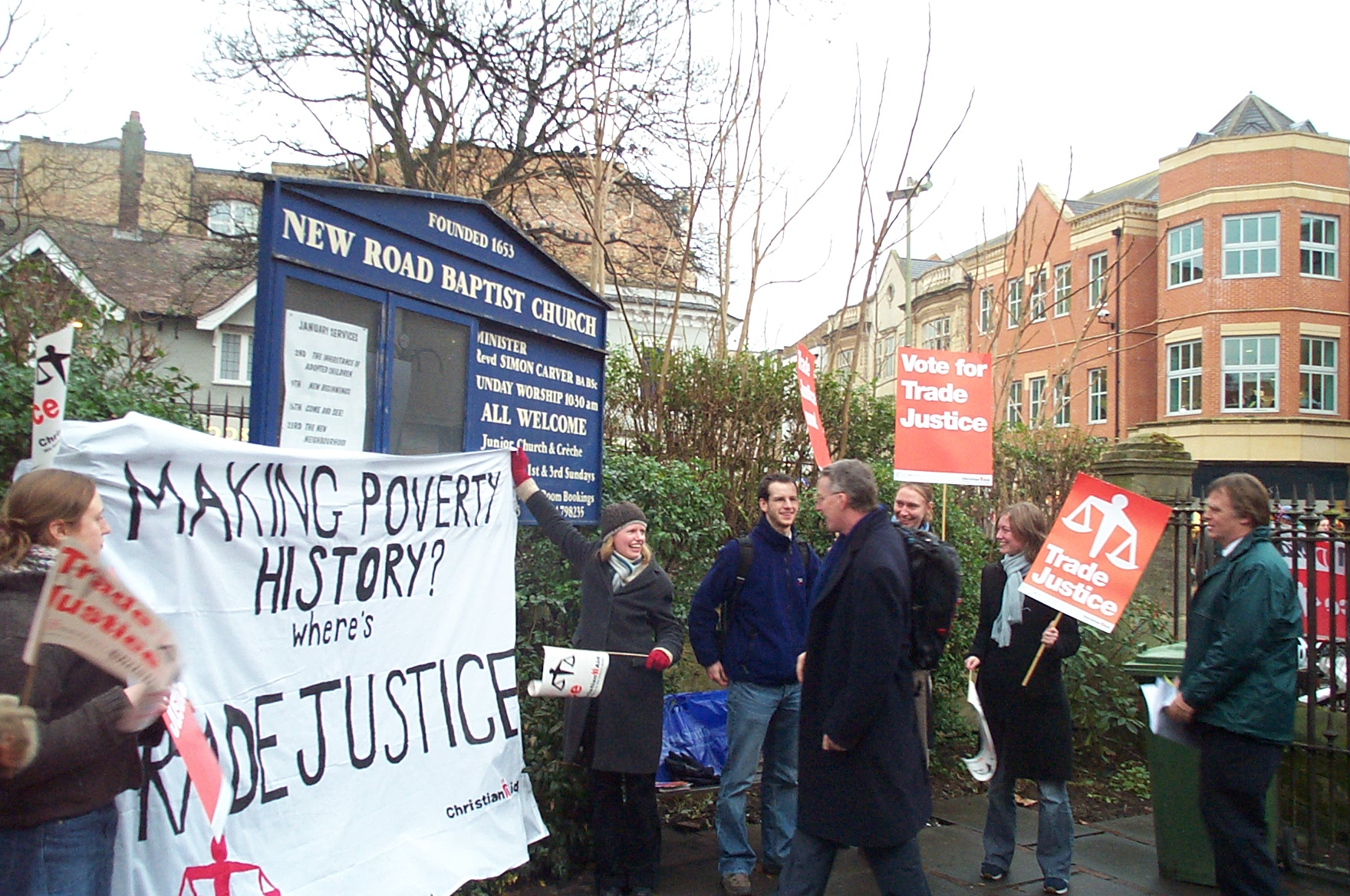
Charitable organizations can use the freedom of speech to campaign and lobby government ministers.

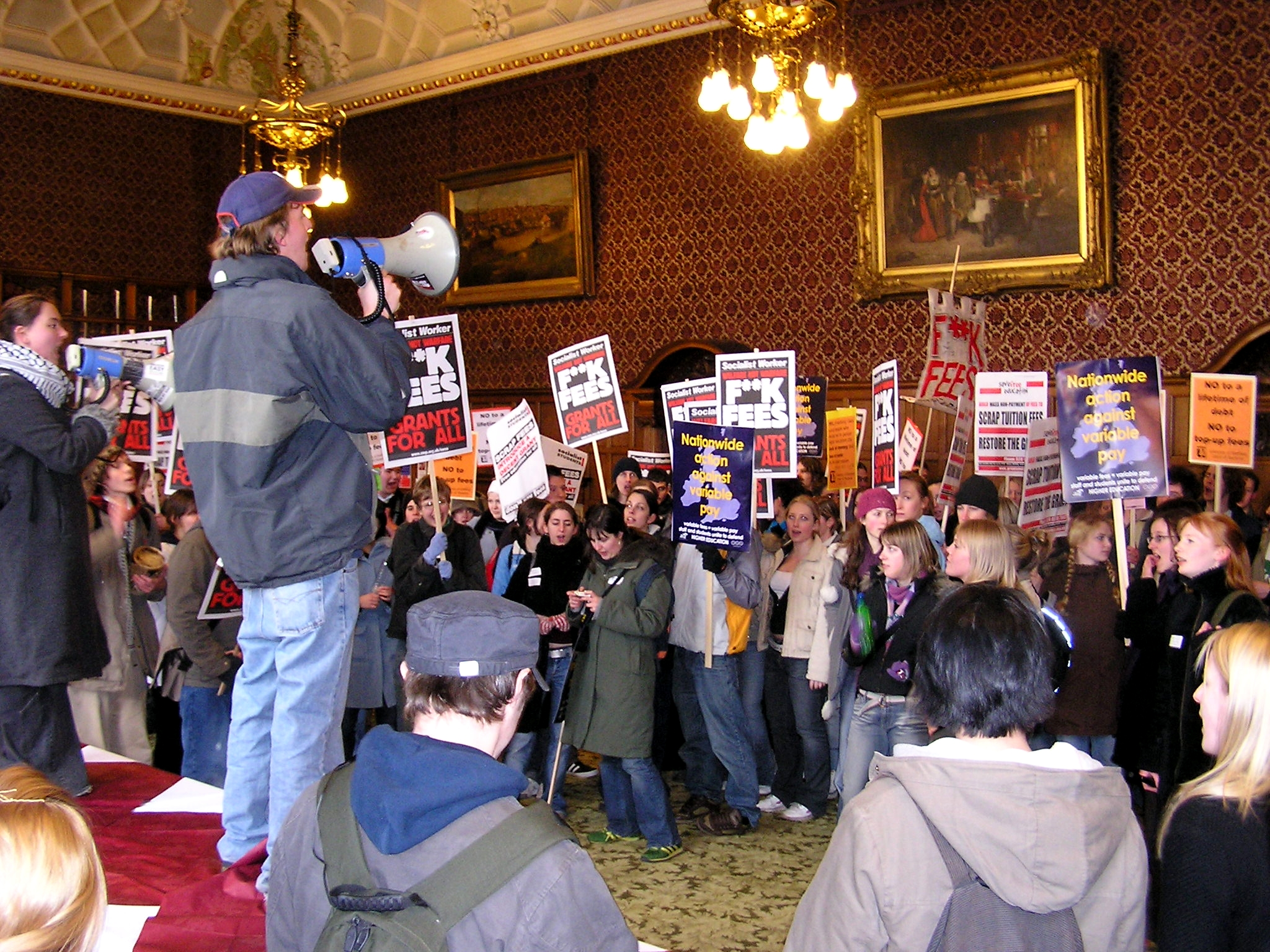
Local issues are often the subject of free speech.

The European Convention on Human Rights (ECHR), signed on 4 November 1950, guarantees a broad range of human rights to inhabitants of member countries of the Council of Europe, which includes almost all European nations. These rights include Article 10, which entitles all citizens to free expression. Echoing the language of the Universal Declaration of Human Rights this provides that:

Everyone has the right to freedom of expression. This right shall include freedom to hold opinions and to receive and impart information and ideas without interference by public authority and regardless of frontiers. This article shall not prevent States from requiring the licensing of broadcasting, television or cinema enterprises.

The convention established the European Court of Human Rights (ECtHR). Any person who feels his or her rights have been violated under the convention by a state party can take a case to the Court. Judgements finding violations are binding on the States concerned and they are obliged to execute them. The Committee of Ministers of the Council of Europe monitors the execution of judgements, particularly to ensure payment of the amounts awarded by the Court to the applicants in compensation for the damage they have sustained.

The convention also includes some other restrictions:

The exercise of these freedoms, since it carries with it duties and responsibilities, may be subject to such formalities, conditions, restrictions or penalties as are prescribed by law and are necessary in a democratic society, in the interests of national security, territorial integrity or public safety, for the prevention of disorder or crime, for the protection of health or morals, for the protection of the reputation or the rights of others, for preventing the disclosure of information received in confidence, or for maintaining the authority and impartiality of the judiciary.

For example, the Council of Europe Explanatory Report of the Additional Protocol to the Convention on Cybercrime states the "European Court of Human Rights has made it clear that the denial or revision of 'clearly established historical facts – such as the Holocaust – [...] would be removed from the protection of Article 10 by Article 17' of the ECHR" in the Lehideux and Isorni v. France judgment of 23 September 1998.

Each party to the Convention must alter its laws and policies to conform with the convention. Some, such as Ireland or the United Kingdom, have expressly incorporated the Convention into their domestic laws. The guardian of the convention is the European Court of Human Rights. This court has heard many cases relating to freedom of speech, including cases that have tested the professional obligations of confidentiality of journalists and lawyers, and the application of defamation law, a recent example being the so-called "McLibel case".

=== European Union ===
Citizens of the European Union enjoy freedom of speech, of the press, of assembly, of association, of procession and of demonstration. Currently, all members of the European Union are signatories of the European Convention on Human Rights in addition to having various constitutional and legal rights to freedom of expression at the national level. The Charter of Fundamental Rights of the European Union has been legally binding since December 1, 2009 when the Treaty of Lisbon became fully ratified and effective. Article 11 of the Charter, in part mirroring the language of the Universal Declaration of Human Rights and the European Convention on Human Rights, provides that

1. Everyone has the right to freedom of expression. This right shall include freedom to hold opinions and to receive and impart information and ideas without interference by public authority and regardless of frontiers.
2. The freedom and pluralism of the media shall be respected.

The European Court of Justice takes into account both the Charter and the Convention when making its rulings. According to the Treaty of Lisbon, the European Union accedes to the European Convention as an entity in its own right, making the Convention binding not only on the governments of the member states but also on the supranational institutions of the EU.

==== Austria ====
In Austria, the right of free speech is subject to limitations, notably the prohibition to call the prophet Muhammad a pedophile, which was reaffirmed by a court in 2009. The European Court of Human Rights upheld the verdict in 2018.

==== Czech Republic ====
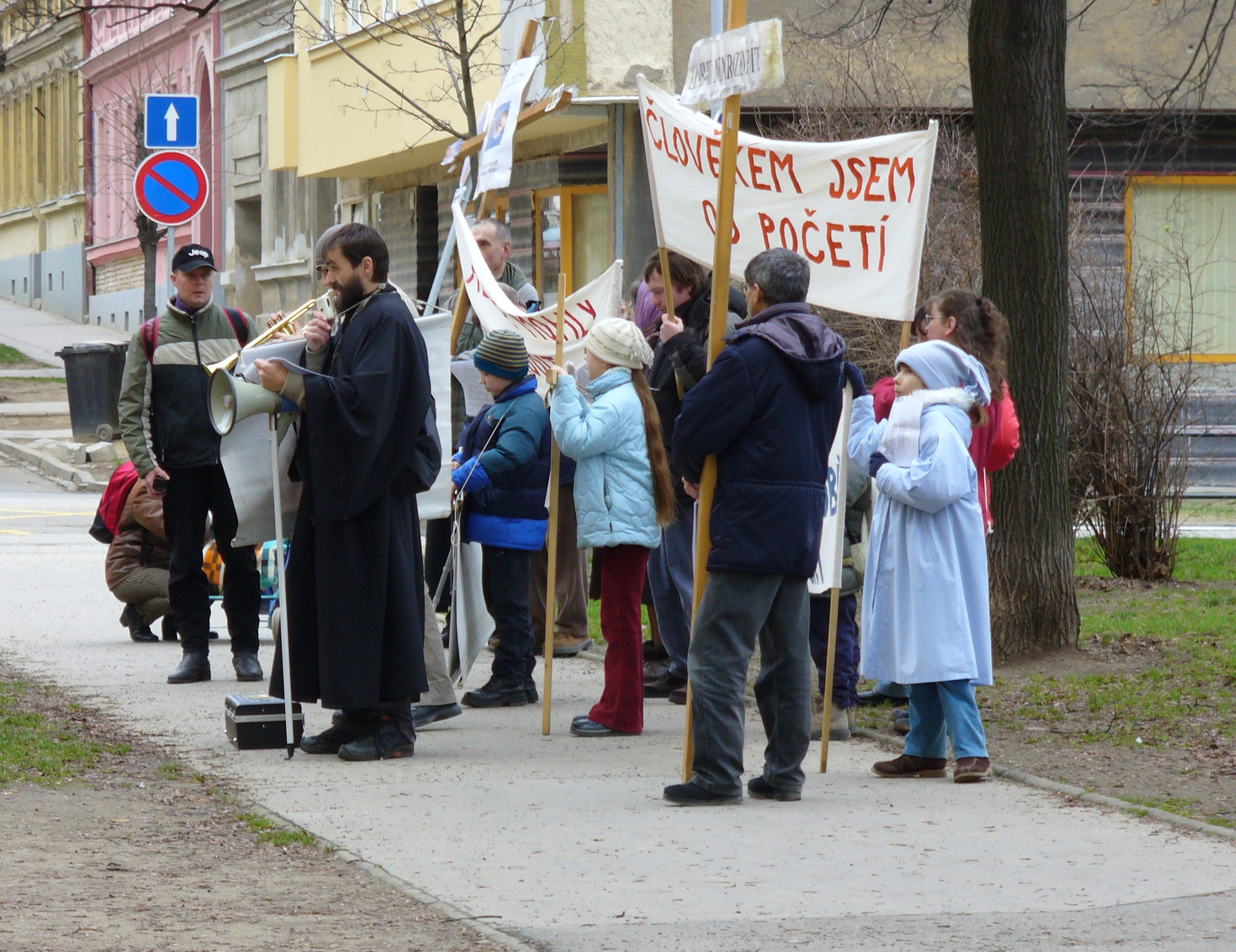
Orthodox priest Libor Halík with a group of followers. Halík has been chanting daily for over five years against abortion via megaphone in front of a maternity hospital in Brno, Moravia.

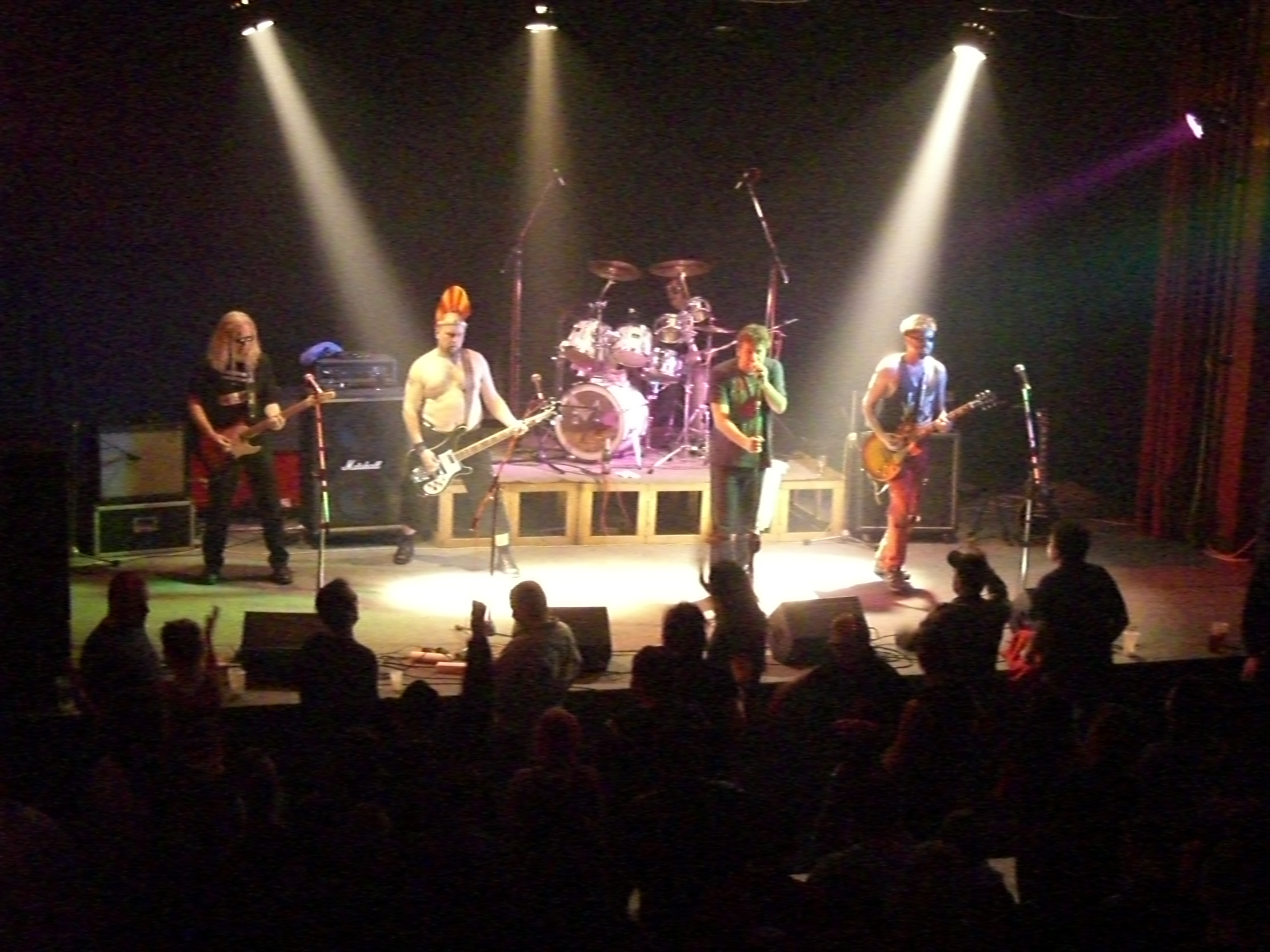
Punk band Visací zámek which composed a popular song "The President Is a Faggot" about Václav Klaus, 2003–2013 Czech President

Freedom of speech in the Czech Republic is guaranteed by the Czech Charter of Fundamental Rights and Basic Freedoms, which has the same legal standing as the Czech Constitution. It is the first freedom of the charter's second division - political rights. It reads as follows:

Article 17

(1) The freedom of expression and the right to information are guaranteed.
(2) Everyone has the right to express their opinion in speech, in writing, in the press, in pictures, or in any other form, as well as freely to seek, receive, and disseminate ideas and information irrespective of the frontiers of the State.
(3) Censorship is not permitted.
(4) The freedom of expression and the right to seek and disseminate information may be limited by law in the case of measures necessary in a democratic society for protecting the rights and freedoms of others, the security of the State, public security, public health, and morals.
(5) State bodies and territorial self-governing bodies are obliged, in an appropriate manner, to provide information on their activities. Conditions therefore and the implementation thereof shall be provided for by law.

Specific limitations of the freedom of speech within the meaning of Article 17(4) may be found in the Criminal Code as well in other enactments. These include the prohibition of:

- unauthorized handling of personal information (Article 180 of the Criminal Code), which protects the right to privacy,
- defamation (Article 184 of the Criminal Code),
- dissemination of pornography depicting disrespect to a human, abuse of an animal, or dissemination of any pornography to children (Article 191 of the Criminal Code),
- seducing to use or propagation of use of addictive substances other than alcohol (Article 287 of the Criminal Code), which protects public health,
- denigration of a nation, race, ethnic or other group of people (Article 355 of the Criminal Code), i.e. hate speech,
- inciting of hatred towards a group of people or inciting limitation of their civil rights (Article 356 of the Criminal Code),
- spreading of scaremongering information (Article 357 of the Criminal Code), e.g. fake bomb alerts,
- public incitement of perpetration of a crime (Article 364 of the Criminal Code),
- public approval of a felony crime (Article 365 of the Criminal Code),
- public display of sympathy towards a movement oriented at curbing rights of the people (Article 404 of the Criminal Code), e.g. propagation of hate-groups,
- public denial, questioning, endorsement or vindication of genocide (Article 405 of the Criminal Code), e.g. Holocaust denial,
- incitement of an offensive war (Article 407 of the Criminal Code).

Most of the limitations of the free speech in the Czech Republic aim at protection of rights of individuals or minority groups. Unlike in some other European countries there are no limits on speech criticizing or denigrating government, public officials or state symbols.

==== Denmark ====
Freedom of speech in Denmark is granted by the Constitution (Grundloven):

§ 77 Any person shall be at liberty to publish their ideas in print, in writing, and in speech, subject to their being held responsible in a court of law. Censorship and other preventive measures shall never again be introduced.

Because of the constitutions only protects against censure, there are some laws where you can be prosecuted for what you say.

Hate speech is illegal according to the Danish Penal Code § 266(b):

Any person who, publicly or with the intention of disseminating ... makes a statement ... threatening (trues), insulting (forhånes), or degrading (nedværdiges) a group of persons on account of their race, national or ethnic origin or belief shall be liable to a fine or to simple detention or to imprisonment for a term not exceeding two years.

==== Finland ====
Finland has been ranked in the Press Freedom Index as the country with the best press freedom in 2002–2006, 2009–2010, and 2012–2014. According to the Constitution, everyone has freedom of expression, entailing the right to express, disseminate and receive information, opinions and other communications without prior prevention by anyone. The Finnish mass-media has its own self-regulatory organ which regulates the ethics of the press.

A demonstration or other public assembly requires no permission from the police or other authorities. If a public meeting is held outdoors, the police must be notified of the event no later than six hours before the assembly is scheduled to begin, but the police have no authority to prohibit the event.

Defamation is a crime only if the target is a private person. Defamation of corporations is never a crime unless it's covered by competition regulations or similar legislation. Sentences have never been given for publishing pro-drug propaganda.

There are few restrictions regarding obscenity. It's illegal to display obscene visual material in a public place in a manner that is likely to cause public offense. In practice this means that obscene photos and videos may be shown only in places where they are expected to be seen, while there are no restrictions on obscene literature. Drawings and animations showing child pornography are legal. While bestiality is legal as such, videos and photographs showing sex with animals are banned. Motion pictures showing "brutal" violence may not be kept accessible to the public or distributed if the display of violence is not deemed necessary for informative or artistic purposes, possession of such audiovisual recordings being still legal. A Finn was sentenced in 2009 to 40 days of probation after keeping Islamic extremist execution videos on his website. Finland had a film censorship board until 2001 when the scope of the board was limited to giving age ratings to movies. After the abolition of film censorship there are no restrictions on sex shown in movies regardless of the venue of display, violent pornography being the only exception to the rule. After the abolishment of film censorship, banning movies that contain brutal violence has been extremely rare.

Disparagement of the flag of Finland is an offense that can be punished with a fine. The ban specifically includes using a flag with unauthorized addenda. This is the only law restricting disparagement of the state and its symbols and institutions.

Blasphemy and hate speech are forbidden. The blasphemy law applies to all religions. The hate speech law protects people of different sexual orientations, races, skin colors, places of birth, national or ethnic origins, religions or beliefs and disabled people. The sentence for committing these crimes could theoretically be imprisonment, but during the modern juridical history the sentence has always been a fine.

The hate speech law is relatively lax. It prohibits only threatening, insulting and defaming the aforementioned groups, while criticism and expression of opinions against these groups of people are not per se forbidden. For instance, unlike in 16 other European countries denying the Holocaust is legal. During the years 2000–2013 there were 21 successful court cases regarding hate speech. The expressions ruled illegal include stating that some groups are trash, a group is a racial monster that needs to be destroyed, and comparing asylum seekers to animals and saying that violence against foreigners is acceptable.

A Finnish member of EU parliament Jussi Halla-aho was sentenced for both blasphemy and hate speech in 2012 by the Supreme Court after saying that "Islam is a paedophilia religion" and "it's a national and possibly even genetic special characteristic of the Somali people to rob passers-by and to be parasites living on the tax-payers' money". According to Jussi Halla-aho himself, the latter was meant to criticize the fact that saying that Finns drink a lot and then kill people due to possibly genetic reasons was held to be in accordance of the ethics of the press by the self-regulatory organ of the mass-media. Fines are income-based in Finland. Halla-aho was sentenced to 50 day-fines and had to pay €550 based on his income.

==== France ====
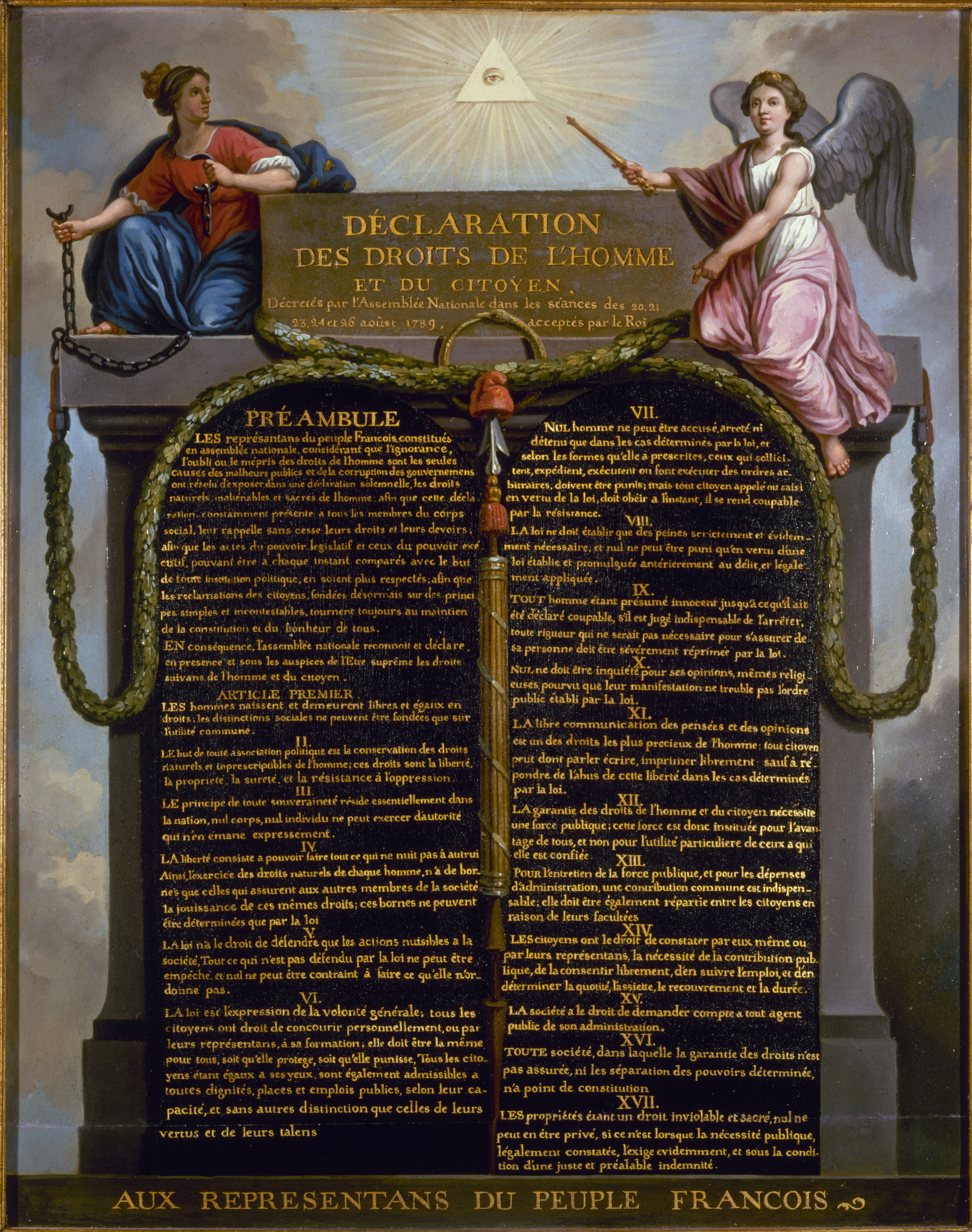
Declaration of the Rights of Man and of the Citizen

The Declaration of the Rights of Man and of the Citizen, of constitutional value, states, in its article 11:

The free communication of thoughts and of opinions is one of the most precious rights of man: any citizen thus may speak, write, print freely, save [if it is necessary] to respond to the abuse of this liberty, in the cases determined by the law.

In addition, France adheres to the European Convention on Human Rights and accepts the jurisdiction of the European Court of Human Rights.

The Press Law of 1881, as amended, guarantees freedom of the press, subject to several exceptions. The Pleven Act of 1972 (after Justice Minister René Pleven) prohibits incitement to hatred, discrimination, slander and racial insults. The Gayssot Act of 1990 prohibits any racist, anti-Semitic, or xenophobic activities, including Holocaust denial. The Law of 30 December 2004 prohibits hatred against people because of their gender, sexual orientation, or disability.

An addition to the Public Health Code was passed on 31 December 1970, which punishes the "positive presentation of drugs" and the "incitement to their consumption" with up to five years in prison and fines up to €76,000. Newspapers such as Libération, Charlie Hebdo and associations, political parties, and various publications criticizing the current drug laws and advocating drug reform in France have been repeatedly hit with heavy fines based on this law.

France does not implement any governmental prior censorship for written publications. Any violation of law must be processed through the courts.

The government has a commission recommending movie classifications, the decisions of which can be appealed before the courts. Another commission oversees publications for the youth. The Minister of the Interior can prohibit the sale of pornographic publications to minors, and can also prevent such publications from being publicly displayed or advertised; such decisions can be challenged before administrative courts.

The government restricts the right of broadcasting to authorized radio and television channels; the authorizations are granted by an independent administrative authority; this authority has recently removed the broadcasting authorizations of some foreign channels because of their antisemitic content.

In July 2019, the French National Assembly has passed the bill for strengthen online hate speech laws. The company requires to remove the content in 24 hours. On 18 June 2020, the French Constitutional Council struck down core provisions of the law.

In the 11 June 2020 judgement, the European Court of Human Rights (ECtHR) found that BDS (Boycott, Divestment, and Sanctions) activists in the Baldassi case rightful. It confirmed the generous case law on the freedom of expression in the context of political debate: called to boycott represent a legitimate exercise of freedom of opinion as far as they do not prompt violence, hatred, or intolerance by any means.

In the aftermath of the murder of Samuel Paty, a contentious discourse on freedom of speech in France was invoked. President Emmanuel Macron strenuously defended the re-publishing of the Charlie Hebdo cartoons, considering this a pure act of freedom of expression that is in line with the state principle of laicity. This was met with outbursts in the Islamic world and reactions from different world leaders and international organizations regarding whether freedom of speech should be absolute. Amnesty international denounced what they perceived as selective exploitation of freedom of speech in France. Citing a number of measures taken after the incident that they likened to prior security changes, the organization reported arrests for "apology of terrorism", which they considered an arbitrary charge to curb opposition to the publication of the cartoons. The organization also criticized the country for its prosecutive record of "contempt for public officials" in France, including the BDS case and another in 2019 where two defendants were convicted for burning an effigy of Macron. It argued that such selectivity is to cover up other laicist violations of freedom of speech, like prohibiting Muslims from wearing religious symbols in schools and public sector jobs.

Numerous agencies, such as FT, Politico, Le Monde, and AP were ordered to remove articles and change content on the orders of the French Government, vis a vis President Macron.

==== Germany ====
Freedom of expression is granted by Article 5 of the Basic Law for the Federal Republic of Germany, which also states that there is no censorship and that freedom of expression may be limited by law.

The press is regulated by the law of Germany as well as all 16 States of Germany. The most important and sometimes controversial regulations limiting speech and the press can be found in the Criminal code:

- Insult is punishable under Section 185. Satire and similar forms of art enjoy more freedom but have to respect human dignity (Article 1 of the Basic law).
- Insult or Slander of Politicians (including local politics) is punishable under Section 188.
- Malicious Gossip and Defamation (Section 186 and 187). Utterances about facts (opposed to personal judgement) are allowed if they are true and can be proven. Yet journalists are free to investigate without evidence because they are justified by Safeguarding Legitimate Interests (Section 193).
- Hate speech may be punishable if against segments of the population and in a manner that is capable of disturbing the public peace (Section 130 [Agitation of the People]), including racist agitation and antisemitism.
- Holocaust denial is punishable according to Section 130 subsection 3.
- Membership in or support of banned political parties (Section 86). Currently banned parties include the SRP and the KPD.
- Dissemination of Means of Propaganda of Unconstitutional Organizations (Section 86).
- Use of Symbols of Unconstitutional Organizations (Section 86a). Items such as the Swastika are banned.
- Disparagement of
  - the Federal President (Section 90).
  - the State and its Symbols (Section 90a).
- Insult to Organs and Representatives of Foreign States (Section 103). (will no longer be valid as of 2018)
- Rewarding and Approving Crimes (Section 140).
- Casting False Suspicion (Section 164).
- Insulting of Faiths, Religious Societies and Organizations Dedicated to a Philosophy of Life if they could disturb public peace (Section 166).
- Dissemination of Pornographic Writings (Section 184).

The prohibition of insult, which has been widely criticized, led to 26,757 court cases, 21,454 convictions and 20,390 fines in 2013 alone. Politico has called Germany's hate speech laws "arguably the strictest anywhere in the Western world". Laws which have led to censorship or chilling effects online include NetzDG and a type of ancillary copyright for press publishers which is a model for a pan-EU taxation proposal as of 2018.

Outdoor assemblies must be registered beforehand. Individuals and groups may be banned from assembling, especially those whose fundamental rights have been revoked and banned political parties. The Love Parade decision (1 BvQ 28/01 and 1 BvQ 30/01 of 12 July 2001) determined that for an assembly to be protected it must comply with the concept of a constituent assembly, or the so-called narrow concept of assembly whereby the participants in the assembly must pursue a common purpose that is in the common interest.

==== Greece ====
The 14th article of the Greek Constitution guarantees the freedom of speech, of expression and of the press for all but with certain restrictions or exceptions; for example although it generally forbids any preemptive or after the fact censorship, it allows public prosecutors (Greek: εισαγγελείς) to order a confiscation of press (or other) publications (after having been published, not before) when the latter:

- 14.3.a: insult Christianity or any other known (Greek: γνωστή) religion,
- 14.3.b: insult the President of Greece,
- 14.3.c: disclose information related to the Greek Armed Forces or to various aspects of Greek National Security,
  - have as a purpose the forceful overturning of the Greek System of Government (Greek: βίαιη ανατροπή του πολιτεύματος),
- 14.3.d: clearly (Greek: ολοφάνερα) offend public decency, in the cases defined by Greek Law (Greek: στις περιπτώσεις που ορίζει ο νόμος).

==== Hungary ====
Articles VII, VIII, IX, and X of the Fundamental Law of Hungary establishes the rights of freedom of expression, speech, press, thought, conscience, religion, artistic creation, scientific research, and assembly. Some of these rights are limited by the penal code:

Section 269 - Incitement against a community
A person who incites to hatred before the general public against

a) the Hungarian nation,
b) any national, ethnic, racial group or certain groups of the population,

shall be punishable for a felony offense with imprisonment up to three years.

This list has been updated to include: "people with disabilities, various sexual identity and sexual orientation", effective from July 2013.

It is also illegal under Section 269/C of the penal code and punishable with three years of imprisonment, to publicly "deny, question, mark as insignificant, attempt to justify the genocides carried out by the National Socialist and Communist regimes, as well as the facts of other crimes against humanity."

==== Ireland ====
Freedom of speech is protected by Article 40.6.1 of the Irish constitution. However the article qualifies this right, providing that it may not be used to undermine "public order or morality or the authority of the State". Furthermore, the constitution explicitly requires that the publication of "seditious, or indecent matter" be a criminal offence. This led to the government passing blasphemy legislation on 8 July 2009. However, in May 2018 there was a referendum which removed the word "blasphemous" from the constitution.

The scope of the protection afforded by this Article has been interpreted restrictively by the judiciary, largely as a result of the wording of the Article, which qualifies the right before articulating it. Indeed, until an authoritative pronouncement on the issue by the Supreme Court, many believed that the protection was restricted to "convictions and opinions" and, as a result, a separate right to communicate was, by necessity, implied into Article 40.3.2.

Under the European Convention on Human Rights Act 2003, all of the rights afforded by the European Convention serve as a guideline for the judiciary to act upon. The act is subordinate to the constitution.

==== Italy ====
In Italy the Constitution guarantees freedom of speech, as stated in Article 21, Paragraph 1:

Anyone has the right to freely express their thoughts in speech, writing, or any other form of communication.

The Article also gives restrictions against those acts considered offensive by public morality, as stated in Paragraph 6:

Publications, performances, and other exhibits offensive to public morality shall be prohibited. Measures of preventive and repressive measure against such violations shall be established by law.

Such restrictions are enforced through the Italian Penal Code which, for example, includes articles that prohibit:

- insults against the honor and prestige of the President (Art. 278),
- vilification of a person's religion (Art. 403),
- insults against the honor and decorum of others (Art. 594) (repealed as of 2016), and
- defamation of another person (Art. 595).

The Supreme Court has long since ruled that the legitimate exercise of the rights of news reporting and journalistic criticism is conditioned by the limit, in addition to truth and public interest, of continence, understood as the formal correctness of the exposition and not exceeding what is strictly necessary for the public interest, so as to ensure news and criticism do not appear through instruments and methods that are detrimental to the fundamental rights to honor and reputation.

Commercial advertising of artwork owned by the government, such as Michelangelo's David (created in the 16th century), require an assessment of the adequacy of the image, which must respect cultural dignity.

==== Malta ====
Blasphemy against the Roman Catholic church was illegal in Malta. However, the law was repealed in 2016.

==== Netherlands ====
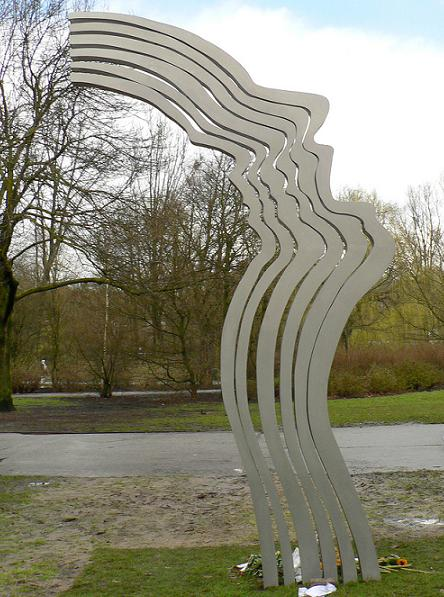
De Schreeuw (The Scream) is a memorial commemorating Theo van Gogh and a symbol of the freedom of speech.

Article 7 of the Dutch Constitution (Grondwet) in its first paragraph grants everybody the right to make public ideas and feelings by printing them without prior censorship, but not exonerating the author from their liabilities under the law. The second paragraph says that radio and television will be regulated by law, but that there will be no prior censorship dealing with the content of broadcasts. The third paragraph grants a similar freedom of speech as in the first for other means of making ideas and feelings public, but allowing censorship for reasons of decency when the public that has access may be younger than sixteen years of age. The fourth and last paragraph exempts commercial advertising from the freedoms granted in the first three paragraphs.

The penal code does have laws sanctioning certain types of expression. Such laws and freedom of speech were at the centre of a public debate in The Netherlands after the arrest on 16 May 2008 of cartoonist Gregorius Nekschot. On 1 February 2014, the Dutch Parliament abolished the law penalizing blasphemy. Laws that punish discriminatory speech exist and are occasionally used to prosecute.

The Dutch Criminal Code § 137(c) criminalizes:

… deliberately giv[ing] public expression to views insulting to a group of persons on account of their race, religion, or conviction or sexual preference.

==== Poland ====
Historically, the Statutes of Wiślica introduced in 1347 by Casimir III of Poland codified freedom of speech in medieval Poland, for example book publishers were not to be persecuted. The idea of freedom of speech was in general highly respected by the Polish elites and established in the Golden Freedoms of the Polish nobility, and it was one of the key dimensions distinguishing the Polish–Lithuanian Commonwealth from the more restrictive absolute monarchies, common in contemporary Europe.

On 18 July 2003, about 30 human rights activists were temporarily detained by the police, allegedly for insulting Vladimir Putin, a visiting head of state. The activists were released after about 30 minutes and only one was actually charged with insulting a foreign head of state.

A law forbidding anyone from blaming the state of Poland for Holocaust atrocities during World War II was voted by lawmakers on January 26, 2018. Following passage of the law the nationalist government normalized hate speech and censored fact-based investigations.

In 2019, Polish authorities arrested an LGBT activist. They charged her with blasphemy for hanging posters of the Virgin Mary beside baby Jesus with a rainbow-coloured halo. Also in 2019, a 1973 art video exhibit of a woman eating a banana was removed on "moral grounds" which prompted protests against the act of censorship.

Insulting a monument is a crime in Poland, punishable by a fine or restriction of liberty. The crime does not require physical damage to the monument; a separate article criminalizes vandalism.

==== Portugal ====
After Salazar's dictatorship was overthrown in 1974, Article 37 of the Constitution of Portugal prohibits censorship of opinion and information, but the 180th article of the Portuguese penal code establishes the notion of crimes against honour, making any statement of fact or any judgement expressed either verbally, visually or by other means, that is offensive to the honor of an individual either to a 3rd party or to the targeted person — even if it's in the form of suspicion and even if that person is deceased, up to 50 years — a criminal offense punishable with imprisonment of up to 6 months or a fine of up to 240 days. If the offense is directed towards either the assembly of the republic, the government, the courts, the council of state, the Public Ministry or any member of those, the prison time goes up from 6 months up to 2 years with an added fine. Any crime against the honor of the president is punishable with imprisonment from 6 months up to 3 years with an added fine. It's also illegal to prevent the president of fulfilling the duties of the office, or to incite any resident in Portugal or any member of the military of doing so or to make them rise up against the authority of the president. If a person is condemned of any of those crimes, and only by request of the accuser, has the sentence publicly known.

==== Spain ====
Article 578 of the Penal Code of Spain prohibits the "Glorification or justification, by any means of public expression or dissemination, of the crimes included in Articles 571-577 of this Code or of those who participated in its execution, or performance of acts involving disrepute, contempt or humiliation of the victims of terrorist offenses or their families[...]". In January 2014, a judge of the Audiencia Nacional banned a planned march in Bilbao in support of jailed members of the Basque terrorist group ETA that was organized by the group Tantaz Tanta ("Drop for drop" in Basque) on the basis that he considered the group to be the successor to Herrira, whose activities had been banned because of its suspected links to jailed ETA militants. In February 2014, a Twitter user was convicted for expressing praise for the terrorist group GRAPO inactive since 90s but not yet formally self-dissolved.

==== Sweden ====
Freedom of speech is regulated in three parts of the Constitution of Sweden:

- Regeringsformen, Chapter 2 (Fundamental Rights and Freedoms) protects personal freedom of expression "whether orally, pictorially, in writing, or in any other way".
- Tryckfrihetsförordningen (Freedom of the Press Act) protects the freedom of printed press, as well as the principle of free access to public records (Principle of Public Access) and the right to communicate information to the press anonymously. For a newspaper to be covered by this law, it must be registered and have a "legally responsible publisher", a Swedish legal term meaning a person who is ultimately accountable for the printed material.
- Yttrandefrihetsgrundlagen (Fundamental Law on Freedom of Expression) extends protections similar to those of Tryckfrihetsförordningen to other media, including television, radio and web sites.

Hate speech laws prohibit threats or expressions of contempt based on race, skin colour, nationality or ethnic origin, religious belief or sexual orientation.

In the weeks preceding the election of 2010, the privately owned TV channel TV4 refused to show an advertisement of the Sweden Democrats party, fearing that it could be prosecuted for publishing hate speech. The ad displayed women in traditional Islamistic burkhas reaching for an emergency brake labelled with the text "Pensions", and an elderly woman reaching for an emergency brake labelled with the text "Immigration", thus implying that there is a fiscal conflict between pension payments and allowing immigration. The law regulating TV and radio broadcasts had previously expressly prohibited discrimination against advertisers, granting a rejected advertiser the right to complain to a national board. However, the ban was lifted just two months before the election, thus making it possible for TV and radio broadcasters to opt out on some parties while showing the commercials of other parties. This was the first election when the Sweden Democrats gained seats in the Swedish Parliament. Some Danish ministers criticized the TV4 decision as democratically unacceptable.

Prior to the election of 2014, the General Secretary for the Swedish Red Cross and former discrimination ombudsman Peter Nobel demanded that the Nazistic Swedes Party be banned. A former police intendent, Erik Rönnegård, stated in the juridical newspaper, Dagens Juridik, that not banning the party showed incompetence of both the police and the judiciary. A large newspaper, Aftonbladet, interviewed "many lawyers" who said that the party must be banned and not banning the party is not in accordance with the United Nations convention on racism. According to the largest Swedish newspaper Dagens Nyheter the governmental decision not to ban the party has been criticized "by many". Both the Prime Minister and Minister of Justice said that freedom of speech must be respected and no parties should be banned. Holding a demonstration requires permission from the Swedish police. The police have so far granted demonstration permissions to the Swedes Party, but Swedish Left Party leader Jonas Sjöstedt has criticized the police for issuing permissions "so generously". The Swedes Party was disbanded on 10 May 2015.

Other laws or exceptions related to freedom of expression in Sweden concern high treason, war mongering, espionage, unauthorized handling of classified information, recklessness with classified information, Insurgency, treason, recklessness that damages the nation, rumour mongering that hurts national security, inciting crime, crimes that obstruct civil liberties, illegal depictions of violence, libel, insults, illegal threats, threats towards police officers or security guards and abuse during legal proceedings.

=== Norway ===
Article 100 of the Norwegian Constitution has granted freedom of speech since 1814 and is mostly unchanged since then. Article 142 of the penal code was a law against blasphemy, but no one has been charged since 1933. It was removed as of 29 May 2015. Article 135a of the penal code is a law against hate speech, which is debated and not widely used.

Article 100 in the Constitution states:

- There shall be freedom of expression.
- No person may be held liable in law for having imparted or received information, ideas or messages unless this can be justified in relation to the grounds for freedom of expression, which are the seeking of truth, the promotion of democracy and the individual's freedom to form opinions. Such legal liability shall be prescribed by law.
- Everyone shall be free to speak their mind frankly on the administration of the State and on any other subject whatsoever. Clearly defined limitations to this right may only be imposed when particularly weighty considerations so justify in relation to the grounds for freedom of expression.
- Prior censorship and other preventive measures may not be applied unless so required in order to protect children and young persons from the harmful influence of moving pictures. Censorship of letters may only be imposed in institutions.
- Everyone has a right of access to documents of the State and municipal administration and a right to follow the proceedings of the courts and democratically elected bodies. Limitations to this right may be prescribed by law to protect the privacy of the individual or for other weighty reasons.
- It is the responsibility of the authorities of the State to create conditions that facilitate open and enlightened public discourse.

Norway has however several laws that ban the right to impart information, such as laws against alcohol and tobacco advertisement on television, radio, newspapers and on the internet.

=== Russia ===
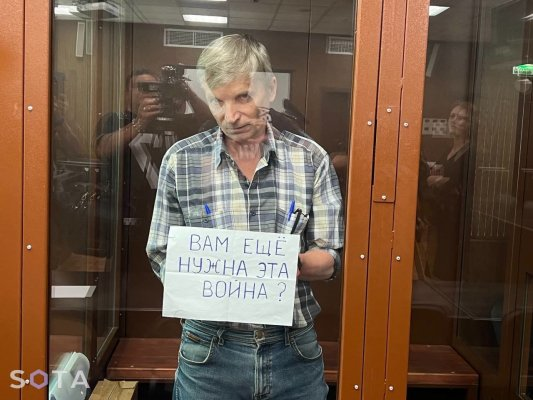
Moscow municipal deputy Alexei Gorinov was sentenced to 7 years in prison under Russia's war censorship laws for his anti-war statements in 2022.

Various aspects of the contemporary press freedom situation are criticized by multiple international organizations. The Russian Constitution provides for freedom of speech and press, however, government application of law, bureaucratic regulation, and politically motivated criminal investigations have forced the press to exercise self-censorship constraining its coverage of certain controversial issues, resulting in infringements of these rights. According to Human Rights Watch, the Russian government exerts control over civil society through selective implementation of the law, restriction and censure.

The 2002 Federal Law on Counteracting Extremist Activity codifies a definition of "extremism", prohibits advocacy of extreme political positions, imposes liability on organizations that do not disavow the "extremist" statements of their members, and allows government authorities to suspend, without court order, social and religious organizations and political parties. In 2014, Russia strengthened criminal responsibility for crimes under Art. 280 ("public calls for extremist activity"), Art. 282 ("inciting hatred or hostility, and humiliation of human dignity"), Art. 282 Part 1 ("the organization of an extremist community") and Art. 282 Part 2 ("the organization of an extremist organization") of the Criminal Code. Under the strengthened laws, those convicted of "extremist activity" face up to six years in prison.

During 2022 Russian invasion of Ukraine censorship laws were enacted, prohibiting a dissemination of "unreliable information" about the operation and "discrediting" the Russian Armed Forces. The laws provide imprisonment for up to 15 years for a "dissemination of unreliable information about Russian Armed Forces and its operations". What is considered "unreliable information" is decided by the Russian government. Roskomnadzor ordered mass media organizations to remove any material using the terms "war", "assault", "invasion", etc. In addition, Roskomnadzor ordered to block access to the Russian Wikipedia in Russia, over the article "Вторжение России на Украину (2022)" ("Russia's invasion of Ukraine (2022)").

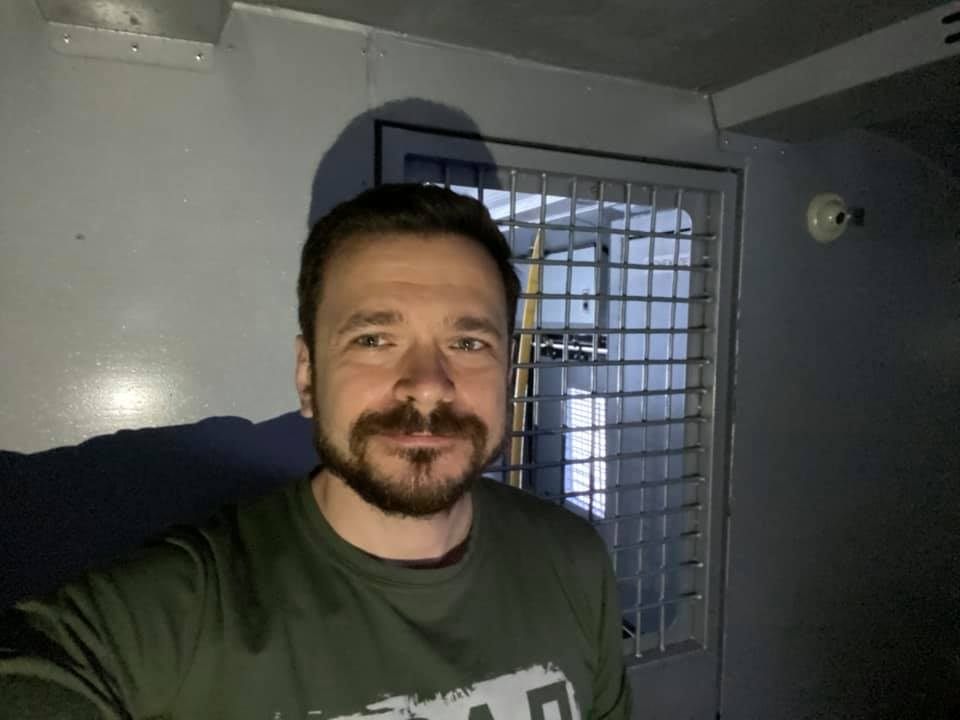
Russian opposition politician Ilya Yashin was sentenced to eight-and-a-half years in prison for discussing the Bucha massacre in Ukraine on a YouTube stream.

In March 2022, Russian journalist Alexander Nevzorov wrote to the Chairman of Russia's Investigative Committee Alexander Bastrykin that Russia's 2022 war censorship laws violate the freedom of speech provisions of the Constitution of Russia. The Russian Constitution expressly prohibits censorship in Chapter 2, Article 29.

A man holding a blank sheet of paper was immediately detained in Novosibirsk. At several protests across the country, many demonstrators have been arrested for simply holding blank sheets of paper. A Russian streamer, Stepan Scoffy, was detained after desecrating the Russian flag over an online donation.

As of December 2022, more than 4,000 people were prosecuted under "fake news" laws in connection with the war in Ukraine. On 17 April 2023, Russian opposition politician and anti-war activist Vladimir Kara-Murza was convicted on charges of treason and "spreading disinformation" about the Russian military, and sentenced to 25 years in prison. Kara-Murza's conviction is the longest sentence for political activity since the fall of the Soviet Union, and the length of the sentence is comparable only to Stalin's purges in the 1930s.

Some critics suspect opponents of Vladimir Putin who died in suspicious circumstances have been assassinated.

=== Switzerland ===
Freedom of expression and information is protected by Article 16 of the Swiss constitution, which states that: 1. Freedom of expression and of information is guaranteed. 2. Every person has the right to freely form, express and impart their opinions. 3. Every person has the right freely to receive information, to gather it from generally accessibly sources and to disseminate it.

Article 261 of the Swiss Criminal Code covers "the attack on the freedom of faith and on the freedom to worship" and "discrimination and incitement to hatred".

In regards to the first section it states that: "any person who publicly and maliciously insults or mocks the religious convictions of others, and in particularly their belief in God, or maliciously desecrates objects of religious veneration, any person who maliciously prevents, disrupts or publicly mocks an act of worship, the conduct of which is guaranteed by the Constitution, or any person who maliciously desecrates a place or object that is intended for a religious ceremony or an act of worship the conduct of which is guaranteed by the Constitution. is liable to a monetary penalty."

The second section states that: "any person who publicly incites hatred or discrimination against a person or a group of persons on the grounds of their race, ethnic origin, religion or sexual orientation, any person who publicly disseminates ideologies that have as their object the systematic denigration or defamation of that person or group of persons, any person who with the same objective organises, encourages or participates in propaganda campaigns, any person who publicly denigrates or discriminates against another or a group of persons on the grounds of their race, ethnic origin, religion or sexual orientation in a manner that violates human dignity, whether verbally, in writing or pictorially, by using gestures, through acts of aggression or by other means, or any person who on any of these grounds denies, trivialises or seeks justification for genocide or other crimes against humanity, any person who refuses to provide a service to another on the grounds of that person's race, ethnic origin, religion or sexual orientation when that service is intended to be provided to the general public, is liable to a custodial sentence not exceeding three years or to a monetary penalty.

Article 258 of the Swiss Criminal Code (Causing fear and alarm among the general public) states that: "Any person who causes fear and alarm among the general public by threatening or feigning a danger to life, limb or property is liable to a custodial sentence not exceeding three years or to a monetary penalty."

Article 259 of the Swiss Criminal Code (Public incitement to commit a felony or act of violence) states that: "Any person who publicly incites others to commit a felony is liable to a custodial sentence not exceeding three years or to a monetary penalty."

=== United Kingdom ===
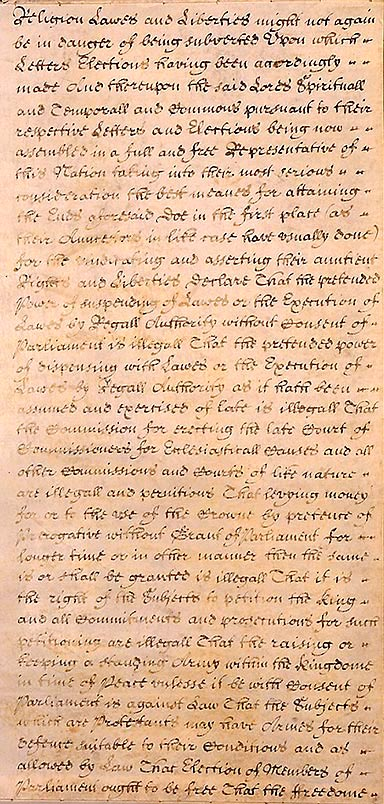
The Bill of Rights 1689 grants the parliamentary privilege for freedom of speech and debates or proceedings in Parliament and is still in effect.

United Kingdom citizens have a negative right to freedom of expression under the common law. In 1998, the United Kingdom incorporated the European Convention, and the guarantee of freedom of expression it contains in Article 10, into its domestic law under the Human Rights Act. However, there is a broad sweep of exceptions including threatening, abusive or insulting words or behavior intending or likely to cause harassment, alarm or distress or cause a breach of the peace (which has been used to prohibit racist speech targeted at individuals), sending any article which is indecent or grossly offensive with an intent to cause distress or anxiety (which has been used to prohibit speech of a racist or anti-religious nature), incitement, incitement to racial hatred, incitement to religious hatred, incitement to terrorism including encouragement of terrorism and dissemination of terrorist publications, glorifying terrorism, collection or possession of a document or record containing information likely to be of use to a terrorist, treason including advocating for the abolition of the monarchy or compassing or imagining the death of the monarch, sedition (no longer illegal, sedition and seditious libel (as common law offences) were abolished by section 73 of the Coroners and Justice Act 2009 (with effect on 12 January 2010)), obscenity, indecency including corruption of public morals and outraging public decency, defamation, prior restraint, restrictions on court reporting including names of victims and evidence and prejudicing or interfering with court proceedings, prohibition of post-trial interviews with jurors, scandalising the court by criticising or murmuring judges, time, manner, and place restrictions, harassment, privileged communications, trade secrets, classified material, copyright, patents, military conduct, and limitations on commercial speech such as advertising. So-called "gagging orders" also serve as a form of censorship.

In politics, it is an offence to make false statements about the conduct or character of a political candidate, but it is not an offence to make other false statements about them.

UK laws on defamation are among the strictest in the western world, imposing a high burden of proof on the defendant. However, the Education (No. 2) Act 1986 guarantees freedom of speech (within institutions of further education and institutions of higher education) as long as it is within the law (see section 43 of the Education (No. 2) Act 1986). UK defamation law may have experienced a considerable liberalising effect as a result of the ruling in Jameel v Wall Street Journal in October 2006. A ruling of the House of Lords—the then highest court of appeal—revived the so-called Reynolds Defence, in which journalism undertaken in the public interest shall enjoy a complete defence against a libel suit. Conditions for the defence include the right of reply for potential claimants, and that the balance of the piece was fair in view of what the writer knew at the time. The ruling removed the awkward—and hitherto binding—conditions of being able to describe the publisher as being under a duty to publish the material and the public as having a definite interest in receiving it. The original House of Lords judgment in Reynolds was unclear and held 3–2; whereas Jameel was unanimous and resounding. Lord Hoffman's words, in particular, for how the judge at first instance had applied Reynolds so narrowly, were very harsh. Hoffman LJ made seven references to Eady J, none of them favorable. He twice described his thinking as unrealistic and compared his language to "the jargon of the old Soviet Union". The Defamation Act 2013 reformed English defamation law on issues of the right to freedom of expression and the protection of reputation, and abolished the Reynolds Defence (Reynolds v Times Newspapers Ltd), also replacing the common law defences of justification and fair comment.

The Video Recordings Act 2010 requires most video recordings and some video games offered for sale in the United Kingdom to display a classification supplied by the BBFC. There are no set regulations as to what cannot be depicted in order to gain a classification as each scene is considered in the context of the wider intentions of the work; however images that could aid, encourage, or are a result of the committing of a crime, along with sustained and graphic images of torture or sexual abuse are the most likely to be refused. The objectionable material may be cut by the distributor in order to receive a classification, but with some works it may be deemed that no amount of cuts would be able to make the work suitable for classification, effectively banning that title from sale in the country. Cinemas by convention use BBFC classifications, but recordings refused a classification by the BBFC may still be shown in cinemas providing the local authority, from which a cinema must have a licence to operate, will permit them.

The Malicious Communications Act 1988 and Communications Act 2003 have been used to restrict what individuals may post on social networks. In 2016, over 3,300 people were arrested under this law. The 2018 trial and conviction of Mark Meechan, a Scottish YouTuber, provoked an international response. In similar circumstances a woman from Liverpool was convicted of sending "an offensive message" after quoting rap lyrics including the word Nigga on her Instagram (later overturned on appeal). In February 2019, former London mayor and former Prime Minister, Boris Johnson, wrote an article in The Daily Telegraph titled: "Why are the police wasting time arresting Twitter transphobes when they could be tackling knife crime?" in which he complains of the heavy-handedness of police to Twitter posts in the United Kingdom.

In February 2020 a previous visit by British police to a man who was told to ''check your thinking'' and accused of posting transphobic tweets was found to be unlawful by the High Court. The court determined the police force's actions were a "disproportionate interference" with his right to freedom of expression.

In February 2021 a Scottish man from Lanark was arrested for an ''offensive tweet'' about a deceased World War II veteran that included the message ''The only good Brit soldier is a deed one, burn auld fella, buuuuurn.''

The British police also record "non-crime hate incidents". The Metropolitan Police recorded almost 5,000 such incidents between June 2022 and April 2024.

In 2024, a trainee midwife was put on Special leave from her placement and had to undergo a Fitness to Practice investigation after responding to a question about whether midwives could opt out of abortions by sharing the official guidance about conscientious objection and stating that she herself was anti-abortion. The investigation concluded that she had 'no case to answer.'

== North America ==
=== Canada ===
==== Constitutional guarantees ====
Freedom of expression in Canada is guaranteed by section 2(b) of the Canadian Charter of Rights and Freedoms:

2. Everyone has the following fundamental freedoms:

...
(b) freedom of thought, belief, opinion and expression, including freedom of the press and other media of communication

Section 1 of the Charter establishes that the guarantee of freedom of expression and other rights under the Charter are not absolute and can be limited under certain situations:

1. The Canadian Charter of Rights and Freedoms guarantees the rights and freedoms set out in it subject only to such reasonable limits prescribed by law as can be demonstrably justified in a free and democratic society. (emphasis added)

Other laws that protect freedom of speech in Canada, and did so, to a limited extent, before the Charter was enacted in 1982, include the Implied Bill of Rights, the Canadian Bill of Rights and the Saskatchewan Bill of Rights.

==== Supreme Court decisions ====
R v Keegstra, decided in 1990, is one of the major Supreme Court decisions relating to freedom of expression. Section 318 of the Criminal Code makes it a criminal offence to promote genocide against members of an identifiable group, based on their colour, race, religion, ethnic origin, sexual orientation or gender expression or identity. Section 319 of the Code makes it an offence to publicly incite hatred against people based on the same list of personal characteristics from s. 318, except where the statements made are true or are made in good faith. In Keegstra, the Supreme Court by a 4-3 decision upheld the offence of publicly inciting hatred, finding that while it infringes the guarantee of freedom of expression, it is a reasonable limit and justifiable under s. 1 of the Charter.

When originally enacted, the list of protected personal grounds in s. 318 did not include sexual orientation, gender identity or gender expression. Sexual orientation was added to the list in 2004, when Parliament passed An Act to amend the Criminal Code (hate propaganda). In 2017, Parliament added gender identity and gender expression to the list of protected personal grounds in s. 318 by An Act to amend the Canadian Human Rights Act and the Criminal Code.

Two years after the Keegstra decision, the Supreme Court of Canada in 1992 decided the case of R v Zundel. The Court struck down a provision in the Criminal Code that prohibited publication of false information or news, stating that it violated section 2(b) of the Charter and could not be justified under s. 1.

==== Human rights complaints ====
Canada has had a string of low-profile court cases in which writers and publishers have been the targets of human rights complaints for their writings, in both magazines and web postings. The human rights process in Canada is civil in nature, not criminal. Most of those complaints were withdrawn or dismissed.

- In 2002 Darren Lund, a professor at the University of Calgary, filed a complaint against Reverend Stephen Boissoin and the Concerned Christian Coalition with the Alberta Human Rights Commission, alleging that Boisson's letter to the Red Deer Advocate was "likely to expose homosexuals to hatred and/or contempt." The Alberta Human Rights Panel found that Boissoin and the Coalition had infringed the hate publication provision of the Alberta Human Rights Act. The Panel ordered Boissoin and the Coalition to cease publishing disparaging remarks about gays and homosexuals; to apologize to Lund; to pay $5,000 in damages to Lund; and to pay costs, up to $2,000. The decision was overturned in 2009 when the Alberta Court of Queen's Bench found that the contents of the letter did not violate the hate publication provision of the Alberta Human Rights Act; that there was no evidence to support a finding against the Coalition; and that the remedies which had been imposed were either unlawful or unconstitutional. The court's decision was upheld by the Alberta Court of Appeal in 2012.
- In February 2006, Calgary Sufi Muslim leader Syed Soharwardy filed a human rights complaint against Western Standard publisher Ezra Levant. Levant was compelled to appear before the Alberta Human Rights Commission to discuss his intention in publishing the Muhammad cartoons. Levant posted a video of the hearing on YouTube. Levant questioned the competence of the commission to take up the issue, and challenged it to convict him, "and sentence me to the apology", stating that he would then take "this junk into the real courts, where eight hundred years of common law" would come to his aid. In February 2008, Soharwardy dropped the complaint noting that "most Canadians see this as an issue of freedom of speech, that that principle is sacred and holy in our society."
- In May 2006, the Edmonton Council of Muslim Communities filed another human rights complaint against the Western Standard over the publishing of the cartoons. In August 2008, the Alberta Human Rights Commission dismissed the complaint, stating that, "given the full context of the republication of the cartoons, the very strong language defining hatred and contempt in the case law as well as consideration of the importance of freedom of speech and the 'admonition to balance,' the southern director concludes that there is no reasonable basis in the information for this complaint to proceed to a panel hearing."
- In 2007, the Canadian Islamic Congress filed complaints filed with the Canadian Human Rights Commission, the Ontario Human Rights Commission and the British Columbia Human Rights Tribunal, all related to an article "The Future Belongs to Islam", written by Mark Steyn, published in Maclean's magazine. The complainants alleged that the article violated their human rights by exposing them to hatred, as did the refusal by Maclean's to provide space for a rebuttal. The complainants also claimed that the article was one of twenty-two Maclean's articles, many written by Steyn, about Muslims. The Ontario Human Rights Commission, the British Columbia Human Rights Tribunal and the Canadian Human Rights Commission all dismissed the complaints in spring 2008.
- In Saskatchewan, human rights complaints were filed against Bill Whatcott alleging that four pamphlets he distributed in Regina and Saskatoon in 2002 promoted hatred against individuals based on their sexual orientation. The complaints were upheld in 2005 by the Saskatchewan Human Rights Tribunal, which ordered Whatcott to pay damages to each of the four complainants, totalling $17,500, and also ordered him not to publish similar pamphlets. Whatcott appealed to the Saskatchewan Court of Queen's Bench, which dismissed the appeal in 2007. However, in February 2010, Whatcott succeeded in his appeal to the Saskatchewan Court of Appeal, which found that the pamphlets did not infringe the hate publication provision of the Saskatchewan Human Rights Code. Part of the judgment allowing his appeal commented that the pamphlets related to "... the manner in which children in the public school system are to be exposed to messages about different forms of sexuality and sexual identity." The judgment went to say: "This is beyond question an important matter of public policy and it is inherently controversial. It must always be open to public debate. That debate will sometimes be polemical and impolite." The Saskatchewan Human Rights Commission then appealed to the Supreme Court of Canada. In February 2013, the Court allowed the commission's appeal in Saskatchewan Human Rights Commission v Whatcott and held that, although Bible passages, biblical beliefs and the principles derived from those beliefs can be legally and reasonably advanced in public discourse, extreme manifestations of the emotion described by the words "detestation" and "vilification" cannot be.

=== Cuba ===
Books, newspapers, radio channels, television channels, movies and music are censored. Cuba is one of the world's worst offenders of free speech according to the Press Freedom Index 2008. RWB states that Cuba is "the second biggest prison in the world for journalists" after the People's Republic of China.

=== United States ===
Congress shall make no law respecting an establishment of religion, or prohibiting the free exercise thereof; or abridging the freedom of speech, or of the press; or the right of the people peaceably to assemble, and to petition the government for a redress of grievances.

— First Amendment to the United States Constitution

In the United States, freedom of speech is protected by the First Amendment to the United States Constitution, and by precedents set in various legal cases. There are several common-law exceptions, including obscenity, defamation, incitement to riot or imminent lawless action, fighting words, fraud, speech covered by copyright, and speech integral to criminal conduct; this is not to say that it is illegal, but just that either state governments or the federal government may make them illegal. There are federal criminal law statutory prohibitions covering all the common-law exceptions other than defamation, of which there is civil law liability, as well as terrorist threats, making false statements in "matters within the jurisdiction" of the federal government, speech related to information decreed to be related to national security such as military and classified information, false advertising, perjury, privileged communications, trade secrets, copyright, and patents. There also exist so-called "gag orders" which prevent the recipient of search warrants and certain court orders (such as those concerning national security letters, subpoenas, pen registers and trap and trace devices, 18 U.S.C. § 2703(d) orders, suspicious activity reports) from revealing them. Most states and localities have many identical restrictions, as well as harassment, and time, place and manner restrictions. In addition, in California it is a crime to post a police officer's or public safety official's address or telephone number on the Internet for the purpose of obstruction of justice or retaliation for the exercise of official duties.

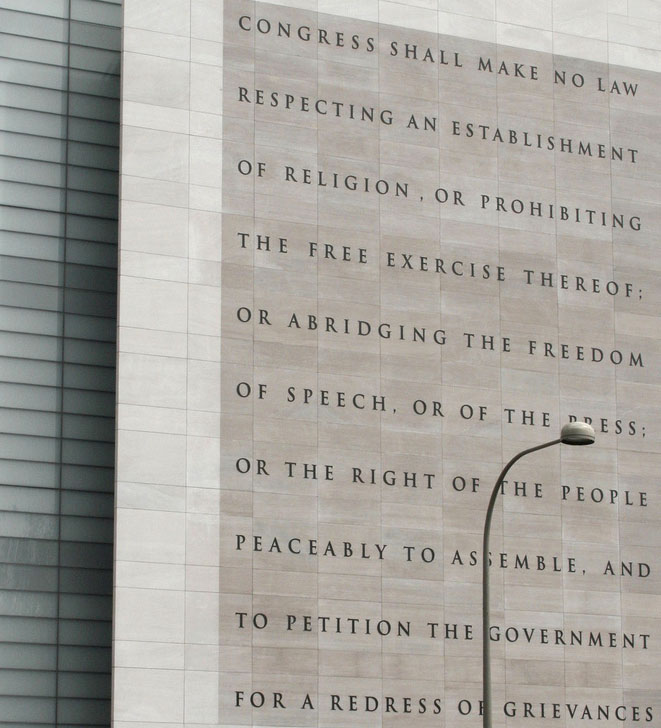
The Newseum's five freedoms guaranteed by the First Amendment to the US Constitution

Historically, local communities and governments have sometimes sought to place limits upon speech that was deemed subversive or unpopular. There was a significant struggle for the right to free speech on the campus of the University of California at Berkeley in the 1960s. And, in the period from 1906 to 1916, the Industrial Workers of the World, a working class union, found it necessary to engage in free speech fights intended to secure the right of union organizers to speak freely to wage workers. These free speech campaigns were sometimes quite successful, although participants often put themselves at great risk.

In some public places, freedom of speech is limited to free speech zones, which can take the form of a wire fence enclosure, barricades, or an alternative venue designed to segregate speakers according to the content of their message. They are most often created at political gatherings or on college or university campuses. There is much controversy surrounding the creation of these areas—the mere existence of such zones is viewed as unconstitutional by some people, who maintain that the First Amendment to the United States Constitution makes the entire country an unrestricted free-speech zone. Civil liberties advocates claim that Free Speech Zones are used as a form of censorship and public relations management to conceal the existence of popular opposition from the mass public and elected officials.

While federal and state governments are barred from engaging in preliminary censorship of movies, nearly all American theatres refuse to exhibit movies that have not been rated by the MPAA, a private movie industry organization. This does not affect movie distribution via physical tapes or discs, cable TV, or the Internet. Since 2000, it has become quite common for movie studios to release "unrated" versions of films on DVD, containing content that had been removed from the theatrical version in order to get a satisfactory MPAA rating.

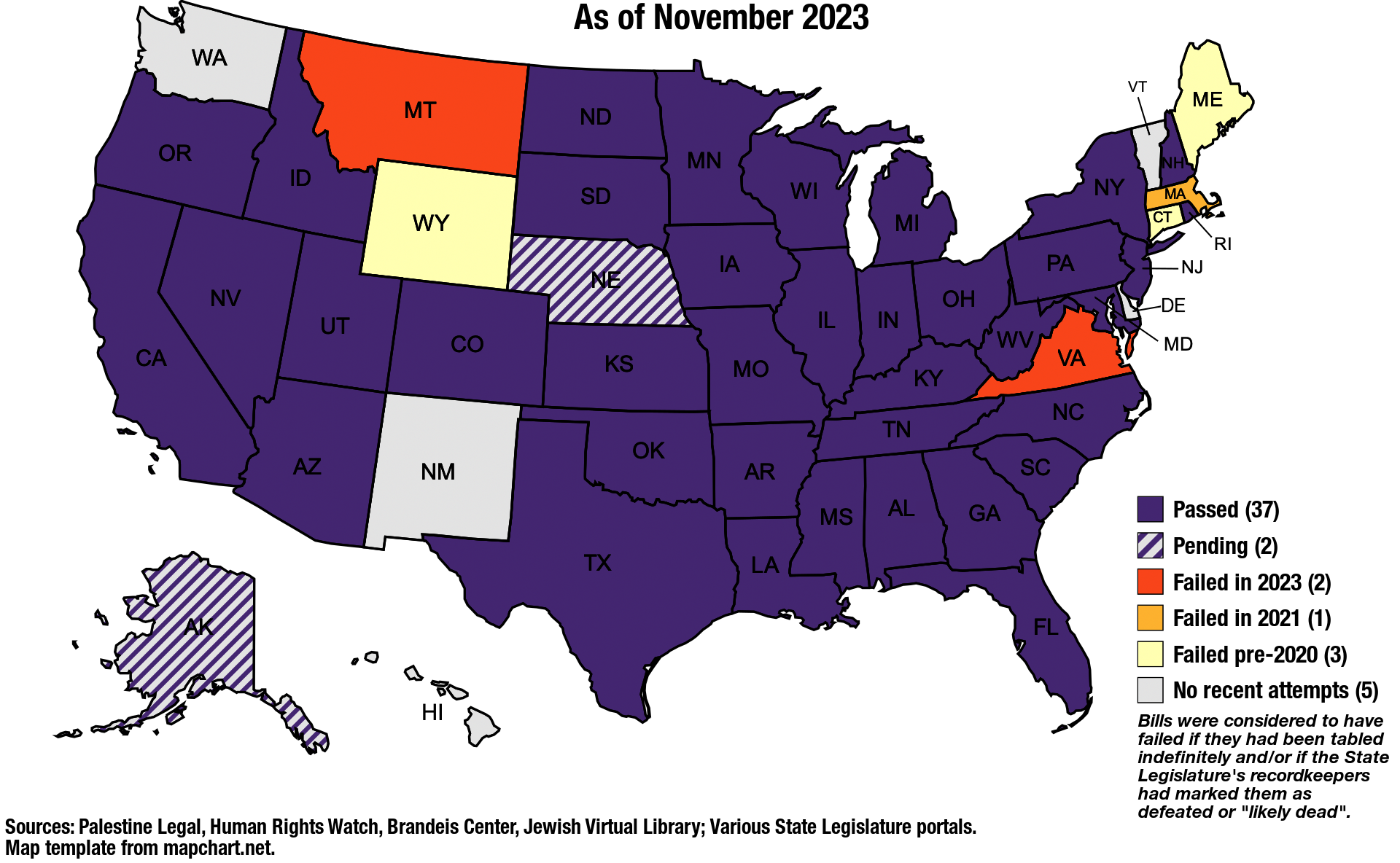
Map showing U.S. states where anti-BDS legislation has passed, is pending, or has failed as of November 2023

Unlike the large number of nations which have enacted laws restricting what they deem to be hate speech, the United States is perhaps unique among the developed world in that under law, some hate speech is protected.

For instance, in July 2012 a U.S. court ruled that advertisements with the slogan, "In any war between the civilized man and the savage, support the civilized man, Support Israel, Defeat Jihad", are constitutionally protected speech and the government must allow their display in New York City Subway. In response on 27 September 2012, New York's Metropolitan Transportation Authority approved new guidelines for subway advertisements, as prohibiting those that it "reasonably foresees would imminently incite or provoke violence or other immediate breach of the peace". The MTA considers the new guidelines adhere to the court's ruling and will withstand any potential First Amendment challenge. Under the new policy, the Authority has continued to allow viewpoint ads, but required a disclaimer on each ad noting that it does not imply the Authority's endorsement of its views.

In response to libel tourism, in 2010 the United States enacted the SPEECH Act making foreign defamation judgments unenforceable in U.S. courts unless those judgments are compliant with the First Amendment.

== South America ==
=== Brazil ===
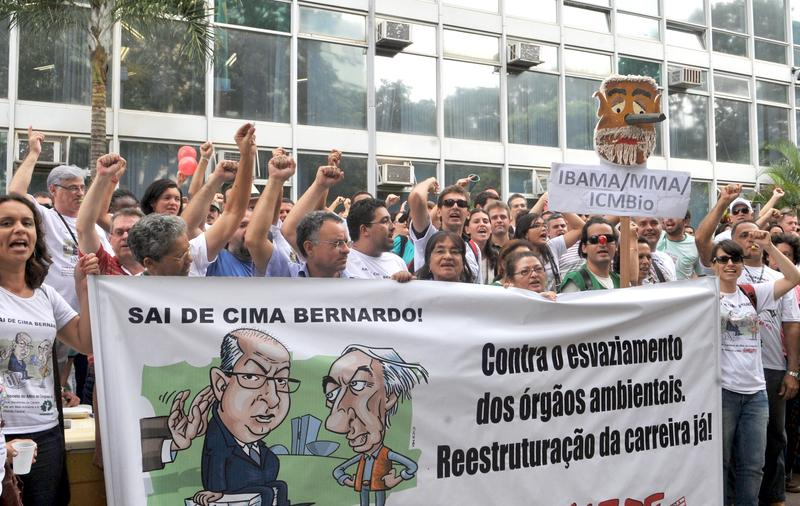
In Brazil, freedom of assembly and expression are Constitutional rights.

In Brazil, freedom of expression is a Constitutional right. Article Five of the Constitution of Brazil establishes that the "expression of thought is free, anonymity being forbidden". Furthermore, the "expression of intellectual, artistic, scientific, and communications activities is free, independently of censorship or license".

However, there are legal provisions criminalizing the desecration of religious artifacts at the time of worship, hate speech, racism, defamation, calumny, and libel. Brazilian law also forbids "unjust and grave threats".

Historically, freedom of speech has been a right in Brazilian Law since the 1824 Constitution was enacted, though it was banned by the Vargas dictatorship and severely restricted under the military dictatorship in 1964–85.

=== Colombia ===
Freedom of Expression in Colombia is guaranteed by Article 20 of the Constitution of Colombia, which states that:

Every person is guaranteed the freedom to express and disseminate their thoughts and opinions, to provide and receive truthful and impartial information, and to establish mass media outlets. The mass media are free and have social responsibility. The right to correction under conditions of fairness is guaranteed. There shall be no censorship.

— Article 20 of the Constitution of Colombia

In its landmark Decision C-442 de 2011, the Constitutional Court identified the categories of speech that fall outside the protection, this includes: "(a)propaganda for war, (b) advocacy of national, racial, religious or other forms of hate that constitute incitement to discrimination, hostility or violence against any person or group of persons on any grounds (encompassing what is commonly referred to as hate speech, discriminatory speech, apology for crime, and advocacy of violence); (c) child pornography; and (d) direct and public incitement to commit genocide."

Obscenity is not a crime in Colombia.

=== Ecuador ===
Freedom of Expression in Ecuador is guaranteed by Article 66 susection 6 of the Constitution of Ecuador, which states that the following right of a person is guaranteed:

The right to voice one's opinion and express one's thinking freely and in all of its forms and manifestations.

— Article 66 Subsection 6 of the Constitution of Ecuador

Accusations or insults without factual basis can be punished by three months to three years in prison according to Article 494 of Ecuador's penal code. Such disposition is common in criminal law in most countries.

In 2012 the Supreme Court of Ecuador upheld a three-year prison sentence and a $42 million fine for criminal libel against an editor and the directors of the newspaper El Universo for "aggravated defamation of a public official". In 2013 Assemblyman Cléver Jiménez was sentenced to a year in prison for criminal libel.

=== Peru ===
Freedom of Speech in Peru is guaranteed by Article 2 Section 4 of the Constitution of Peru, which reads:

To freedom of information, opinion, expression, and dissemination of thought, whether oral, written, or in images, through any medium of social communication, and without previous authorization, censorship, or impediment, under penalty of law.

Crimes committed by means of books, the press, and any other social media are defined by the Criminal Code and tried in a court of law.

Any action that suspends or closes down any organ of expression or prevents its free circulation constitutes a crime. The rights of information and opinion include those of founding means of communication.

— Article 2 Section 4 of the Peruvian Constitution

This right is generally respected by the government, and access to internet is not restricted nor monitored in Peru. However, there were reports that some private groups such as the coca growers (cocaleros), as well as some provincial and local authorities, have been harassing journalists by threatening judicial actions against them, illegally arresting them or attacking them.

== See also ==
- Press Freedom Index
- Free Speech Movement
- Freedom (political)
- International Freedom of Expression Exchange
- Media transparency
- Linguistic rights
- List of linguistic rights in African constitutions
- List of linguistic rights in European constitutions
