= Civil wrong =

Cause of action in civil (non-criminal) law

A civil wrong or wrong is a cause of action under civil law. Types include tort, breach of contract and breach of trust.

Something that amounts to a civil wrong is wrongful. A wrong involves the violation of a right because wrong and right are contrasting terms. An 1860 legal ruling stated that: "It is essential to an action in tort that the act complained of should under the circumstances be legally wrongful as regards the party complaining; that is, it must prejudicially affect him in some legal right".

The law that relates to civil wrongs is part of the branch of the law that is called the civil law. A civil wrong can be followed by civil proceedings. It is a misnomer to describe a civil wrong as a "civil offence". The law of England recognised the concept of a wrong before it recognised the distinction between civil wrongs and crimes in the 13th century.

== See also ==
- Civil penalty
- Misconduct
- Wrongdoing
