= Additional Protocol to the Convention on Cybercrime =

International computer law treaty

Additional Protocol to the Convention on Cybercrime, concerning the criminalisation of acts of a racist and xenophobic nature committed through computer systems is an additional protocol to the Council of Europe Budapest Convention on Cybercrime. This additional protocol was the subject of negotiations in late 2001 and early 2002. Final text of this protocol was adopted by the Council of Europe Committee of Ministers on 7 November 2002 under the title "Additional Protocol to the Convention on Cybercrime, concerning the criminalisation of acts of a racist and xenophobic nature committed through computer systems (ETS No. 189), ("Protocol"). The Protocol opened on 28 January 2003 and entry into force is 1 March 2006. As of January 2025, 37 States have ratified the Protocol and a further 10 have signed the Protocol but have not yet followed with ratification.

The Protocol requires participating States to criminalize the dissemination of racist and xenophobic material through computer systems, as well as of racist and xenophobic-motivated threats and insults. Article 6, Section 1 of the Protocol specifically covers the denial of the Holocaust and other genocides recognized as such by other international courts set up since 1945 by relevant international legal instruments. Section 2 of Article 6 allows a Party to the Protocol at their discretion only to prosecute if the offense is committed with the intent to incite hatred, discrimination or violence; or to make use of a reservation, by allowing a Party not to apply – in whole or in part – Article 6.

The Council of Europe Explanatory Report of the Protocol states the "European Court of Human Rights has made it clear that the denial or revision of 'clearly established historical facts – such as the Holocaust – ... would be removed from the protection of Article 10 by Article 17' of the ECHR (see in this context the Lehideux and Isorni judgment of 23 September 1998)".

Two of the English speaking states in Europe, Ireland and the United Kingdom, have not signed the additional protocol, (the third, Malta, signed on 28 January 2003, but has not yet ratified it). On 8 July 2005 Canada became the first non-European state to sign the convention. The United States government does not believe that the final version of the Protocol is consistent with the United States' constitutional guarantees and has informed the Council of Europe that the United States will not become a Party to the protocol.
