= Lehideux and Isorni v France =

Lehideux and Isorni v. France (case no. 55/1997/839/1045, application no. 24662/94, Publication 1998-VII, no. 92), was a case heard by the European Court of Human Rights on punishing statements praising collaborators. In a judgement handed down 23 September 1998, the court has held by fifteen votes against six that the conviction of applicants for their article in favour of Philippe Pétain was prescribed by law and pursued a legitimate aim, but wasn't necessary in a democratic society and therefore violated Article 10 (freedom of expression).

Besides, the court has ruled that the case "does not belong to the category of clearly established historical facts – such as the Holocaust – whose negation or revision would be removed from the protection of Article 10 by Article 17" (Para. 47). In doing so the court has ruled that the protections in Article 17, the prohibition of abuse of rights, could restrict the right of free speech granted under Article 10.

This ruling has had a direct influence on International treaty law. The "Additional Protocol to the Convention on cybercrime, concerning the criminalisation of acts of a racist and xenophobic nature committed through computer systems" requires participating States to criminalize the dissemination of racist and xenophobic material through computer systems, as well as of racist and xenophobic-motivated threats and insults. Article 8, Section 1 of the protocol specifically covers the denial of the Holocaust and other genocides recognised as such by other international courts set up since 1945 by relevant international legal instruments. The Council of Europe Explanatory Report of the protocol states "European Court of Human Rights has made it clear that the denial or revision of "clearly established historical facts – such as the Holocaust – [...] would be removed from the protection of Article 10 by Article 17" of the ECHR (see in this context the Lehideux and Isorni judgment of 23 September 1998)".

== See also ==
- Jacques Isorni
- François Lehideux
- Association for the Defence of the Memory of Marshal Pétain
