= Civil offence =

Civil offence was a term of art in military law in the United Kingdom.

In the Army Act 1955 (3 & 4 Eliz. 2. c. 18) and the Air Force Act 1955 (3 & 4 Eliz. 2. c. 19), the expression "civil offence" meant any act or omission punishable by the law of England or which, if committed in England, would be punishable by that law.

As to this definition, see Cox v Army Council [1963] AC 48, HL.

Section 42(1) of the Naval Discipline Act 1957 (5 & 6 Eliz. 2. c. 53) defined a civil offence as "any act or omission which is punishable by the law of England or would be so punishable if committed in England."

See now the offence of "criminal conduct" under section 42 of the Armed Forces Act 2006.

It is a misnomer to describe a civil wrong as a "civil offence".
