= Chinese Portuguese =

Chinese Portuguese or Portuguese Chinese may refer to

- Macanese language, a Portuguese-based creole originating from Macau
- Macanese Portuguese, a Portuguese dialect spoken in Macau
- Macanese cuisine, the cuisine of Macau, with influences from southern Chinese and Portuguese cuisines
- Macanese people, people of mixed Chinese and Portuguese descent in Macau
- People with dual citizenship of China and Portugal

== See also ==
- Chinese people in Portugal
