= Macau people =

People who originate from or live in Macau

澳門人
- Population of Macau according to place of birth in 2011. Legend in German.

Total population
- 713,753

Regions with significant populations
- Macau: 642,753 (2019)
- China: 50,000
- Hong Kong: 10,000
- South Korea: 5,000
- United States: 3,000
- Japan: 2,000
- Australia: 1,000

Languages
- Cantonese (native language), Mandarin, English (majority); Portuguese, Macanese (minority)

Religion
- Non-religious with Chinese folk religion, Confucianism, Taoism, Buddhism, Christianity and other faiths

Related ethnic groups
- Cantonese people, Hongkongers, Hakka people, Tanka people, Chinese Brazilian

Macau people
- Traditional Chinese: 澳門人
- Simplified Chinese: 澳门人
Transcriptions
Standard Mandarin
- Hanyu Pinyin: Àomén rén
Hakka
- Romanization: Au^{4} mun^{2} ngin^{2}
Yue: Cantonese
- Yale Romanization: Oumún Yàhn
- Jyutping: Ou^{3}mun^{2} jan^{4}

Macau people (Chinese: 澳門人) are people who originate from or live in Macau.

Besides their use to refer to Macau residents, these terms may also be used more loosely to refer to those who may not be residents, but have lived in the city for an extensive period of time or have a strong cultural connection with Macau. Macau people do not comprise one particular ethnicity, and people that live in Macau are independent of Chinese citizenship and residency status. The majority of Macau people are of Chinese descent and are ethnic Han Chinese (with most having ancestral roots in the province of Guangdong). Macau people with Portuguese ancestry are known as the Macanese.

== Name ==
The Chinese terms "澳門人" (lit. 'Macau people') and "土生葡人" (lit. 'native-born Portuguese people') refer to the Macau people and the Macanese people, respectively. Attempts by the Portuguese Macau government in the mid-1990s to redefine the Portuguese macaense and English Macanese as Macau Permanent Resident (anyone born in Macau regardless of ethnicity, language, religion or nationality) failed. Consequently, the terms macaense and Macanese refers neither to the indigenous people of Macau (Tanka people) nor to the demonym of Macau, but to a distinctive minority culture (1.2% of all Macau population). However, due to the rise of localism among the Macau people (particularly the young people) after the handover of Macau, the term “Macanese” can be used loosely to refer to the people that were born in or live in Macau.

== See Also ==
- Demographics of Macau
- Cantonese people
- Hongkongers
- Hoklo people
- Tanka people
