= Portuguese-speaking world =

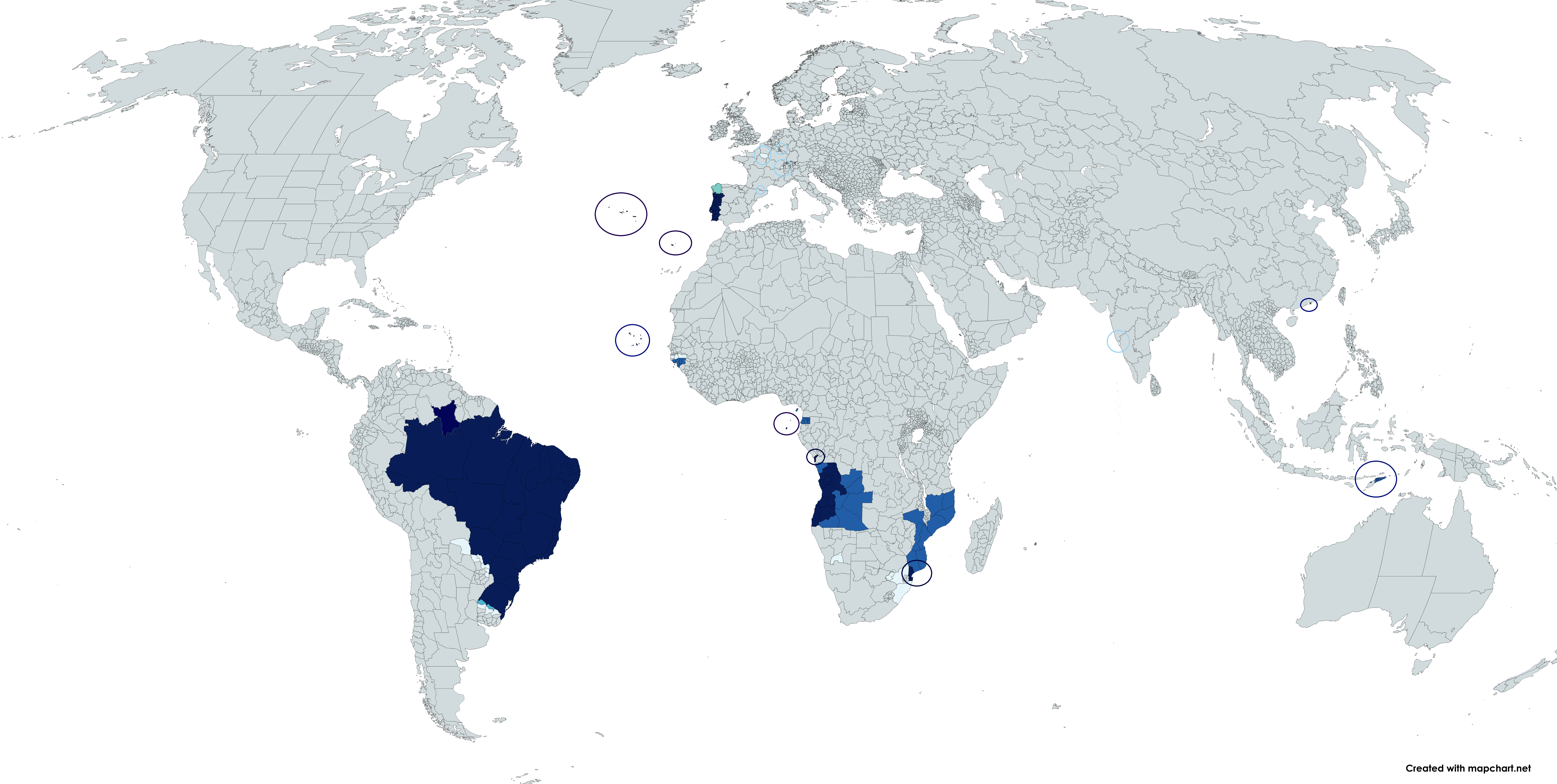
Portuguese language map – world geographical distribution Native/mother language of the majority of the population (core Lusosphere) Official and administrative language, but minority native language (<50%) Cultural or secondary language – not official but spoken as the main native language, e.g. Uruguayan Portuguese (Fronteiriço, Riverense) Cultural or secondary language - not official but spoken as a minority native or second language Galician is an official language (seen by some organizations as the same language as Portuguese)

The Portuguese-speaking world, also known as the Lusophone world (Portuguese: mundo lusófono), Lusophony (Lusofonia), or the Lusosphere (Portuguese: Lusoesfera) is the countries and territories in which the Portuguese language is an official, administrative, cultural, or secondary language. This article provides details regarding the geographical distribution of all Portuguese-speakers or Lusophones, regardless of legislative status. The prefix luso derives from the name of the ancient Roman province of Lusitania.

Portuguese is one of the most widely spoken languages in the world and is an official language of countries on four continents. The Community of Portuguese Language Countries (CPLP) is an international organization formed to facilitate cooperation between these countries.

== Statistics ==
=== Native speakers ===
This table depicts the native speakers of the language, which means that the table includes people who have been exposed to the Portuguese language from birth and, thus, excludes people who use the language as a second language (L2).

Country or territory	Number	%	Year	Note	Reference(s)
Andorra	10,760	13.5%	2022	(Note: The percentage is calculated from the World Bank population estimate for the given year.)	
Angola	16,655,129	45.5%	2024		
Australia	67,327	0.3%	2021	(Note: The reported population size was obtained by projecting the respondent percentage to the total population, since the source either included the part of the population who did not answer or did not take into account some parts of the population, for example children.)	
Austria	3,197	0.04%	2001		
Belgium	72,715	0.7%	2012	(Note: Population data by Eurostat, using the source year."The number of persons having their usual residence in a country on 1 January of the respective year". ec.europa.eu. Archived from the original on 2020-01-22.)	
Brazil	203,000,000	97%	2022		
Canada	221,540	0.7%	2016		
Cape Verde	11,800	2.2%	2016		
Cayman Islands	167	0.2%	2021		
France	1,089,497	1.7%	2007	(Note: Population data by Eurostat, using the source year. "Population on 1 January". European Commission.)	
Germany	166,000	0.2%	2023		
Ireland	43,985	0.8%	2022		
Isle of Man	125	0.1%	2021		
Liechtenstein	390	1.0%	2020		
Luxembourg	125,554	19%	2023		
Macau (China)	3,779	0.6%	2016		
Mexico	15,300	0.2%	2019		
Mozambique	5,260,000	17%	2020		
Netherlands	47,848	0.3%	2012		
Portugal	10,153,345	97%	2023		
São Tomé and Principe	153,120	66%	2022		
South Africa	95,161	0.16%	2022		
Spain	251,497	0.54%	2021		
Switzerland	297,097	3.4%	2023		
Timor Leste	9,524	0.7%	2022		
United Kingdom	236,185	0.36%	2021	(Note: 224,719 in England and Wales, 6,485 in Scotland, 4,981 in Northern Ireland)	
United States	1,154,577	0.34%	2023		
Total	238,975,388				

== Status by country ==
Continent	Country or territory	Status
Africa	Angola	Official (see Angolan Portuguese)
Africa	Cape Verde	Official (see Cape Verdean Portuguese)
Africa	Equatorial Guinea	Co-official with French and Spanish
Africa	Guinea-Bissau	Official (see Guinean Portuguese)
Africa	Mozambique	Official (see Mozambican Portuguese)
Africa	Namibia	Minority
Africa	São Tomé and Príncipe	Official (see São Tomean Portuguese)
Africa	South Africa	Minority
Asia	Timor-Leste	Co-official with Tetun (see East Timorese Portuguese)
Asia	India	Minority in the state of Goa (see Goan Portuguese)
Asia	Japan	Minority (see Brazilians in Japan)
Asia	Macau (China)	Co-official with Chinese (see Macanese Portuguese & Macanese)
Asia	Malaysia	Minority in Malacca (see Kristang language)
Europe	Andorra	Minority
Europe	France	Minority
Europe	Germany	Minority
Europe	Luxembourg	Minority
Europe	Portugal	Official (see European Portuguese)
Europe	Spain	Minority in Olivenza; Galician is official in Galicia
Europe	Switzerland	Minority
North America	Canada	Minority
North America	United States	Minority
Oceania	Australia	Minority
South America	Argentina	Minority
South America	Colombia	Minority
South America	Brazil	Official (see Brazilian Portuguese)
South America	Paraguay	Minority
South America	Uruguay	Minority (see Uruguayan Portuguese)
South America	Venezuela	Minority

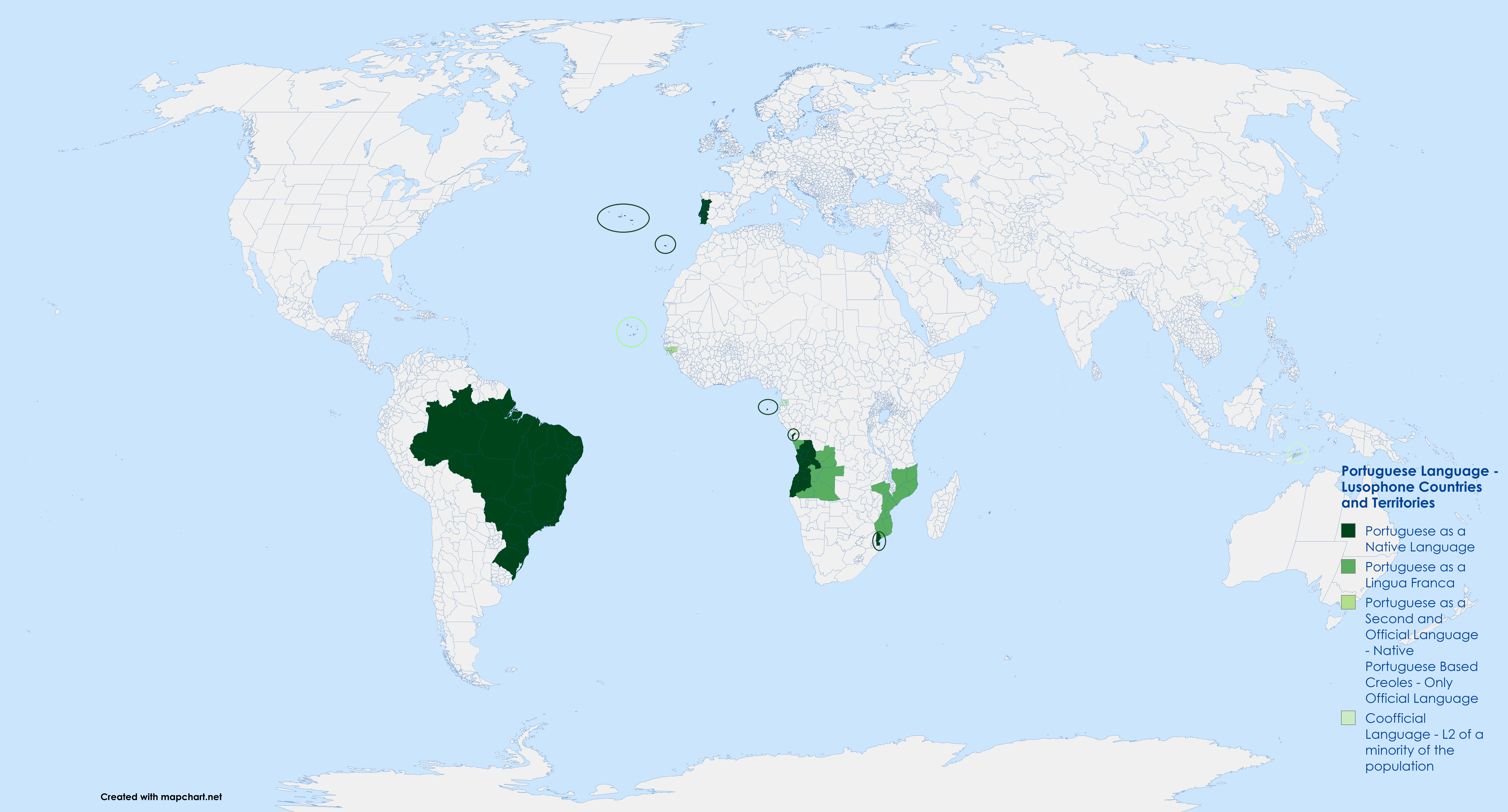
Portuguese-speaking world – countries and territories where Portuguese is spoken – native language in dark green

== Spread of Portuguese ==
Prevalence of Portuguese native speakers per country Prevalence of native speakers: 90–100% Prevalence of native speakers: 40–70% Prevalence of native speakers: 10–20% Prevalence of native speakers: 1–5% Prevalence of native speakers: less than 1%

Approximate distribution of total Portuguese speakers – L1+L2 (assuming a rounded total of 270 million) worldwide – data from IBGE:
1. Brazil (78.1%)
2. Angola (9.50%)
3. Mozambique (7.20%)
4. Portugal (3.90%)
5. Minority communities of speakers outside of Lusosphere – Uruguay, Paraguay, France, USA, Switzerland and others + rest of CPLP – Guinea Bissau, Cape Verde, São Tomé e Príncipe, East Timor (1.30%)
Minority communities
Approximate distribution of total Portuguese speakers – L1+L2 (assuming a rounded total of 3,264 million speakers) outside the Lusosphere – the total number of speakers projected by IBGE seems to be underestimated, so the category others will probably have fewer speakers than in reality
1. Uruguay (30.6%)
2. Paraguay (19.9%)
3. Cape Verde (15.3%)
4. São Tomé e Príncipe (7.00%)
5. Guinea Bissau (6.10%)
6. East Timor (5.70%)
7. Others (15.2%)

During a period of Portuguese discoveries and through a large colonial empire, the language was spread to areas in Africa, the Americas, and Asia, beyond East Timor and Macau in the Far East. Portuguese-based creole languages also developed during this era.

Today, Portuguese continues to thrive outside the Lusophone world through the presence of large expat communities of Angolans, Brazilians, Cape Verdeans, Portuguese, and Timorese found throughout the world.

=== Europe ===
==== Portugal ====
Portuguese is spoken as a first language in Portugal (the language's namesake) by nearly all of the nation's 10.6 million people. The ancestor of modern Portuguese, Galician–Portuguese, began developing in the north-west of the Iberian Peninsula, in an area encompassing present-day northern Portugal and Galicia, at around the 9th century. Modern Portuguese started developing in the early 16th century.

==== Galicia (Spain) ====
The region of Galicia in Spain is not exactly classified as Lusophone, but holds close ties to the Lusophony. The Galician language used to form a common dialect continuum with Portuguese during the Middle Ages, denominated as Galician–Portuguese by historians. Thus, efforts have been made by the Xunta de Galicia to promote cultural and linguistical interchange between Galicia and the Lusophone world, such as the Euroregion between Galicia and North Portugal. The Consello da Cultura Galega (Council of Galician Culture) has been considered an observer member of the CPLP since 2016.

==== Rest of Europe ====
Portuguese-speaking immigrants from Portuguese-speaking Africa, Brazil, Macau, and Portugal have also settled in Andorra (around 15,000 speakers), Belgium, France (around 500,000 speakers), Germany, Luxembourg, Spain, Switzerland, and the United Kingdom. In Luxembourg, 19% of the population speaks Portuguese as mother tongue, making it the largest minority language by percentage in a Western European country.

=== Africa ===
==== Angola ====
Portuguese is the sole official language of Angola, and 85% of the population profess fluency in the language. Additionally, 75% of Angolan households speak Portuguese as their primary language, and native Bantu languages have been influenced by Portuguese through loanwords.

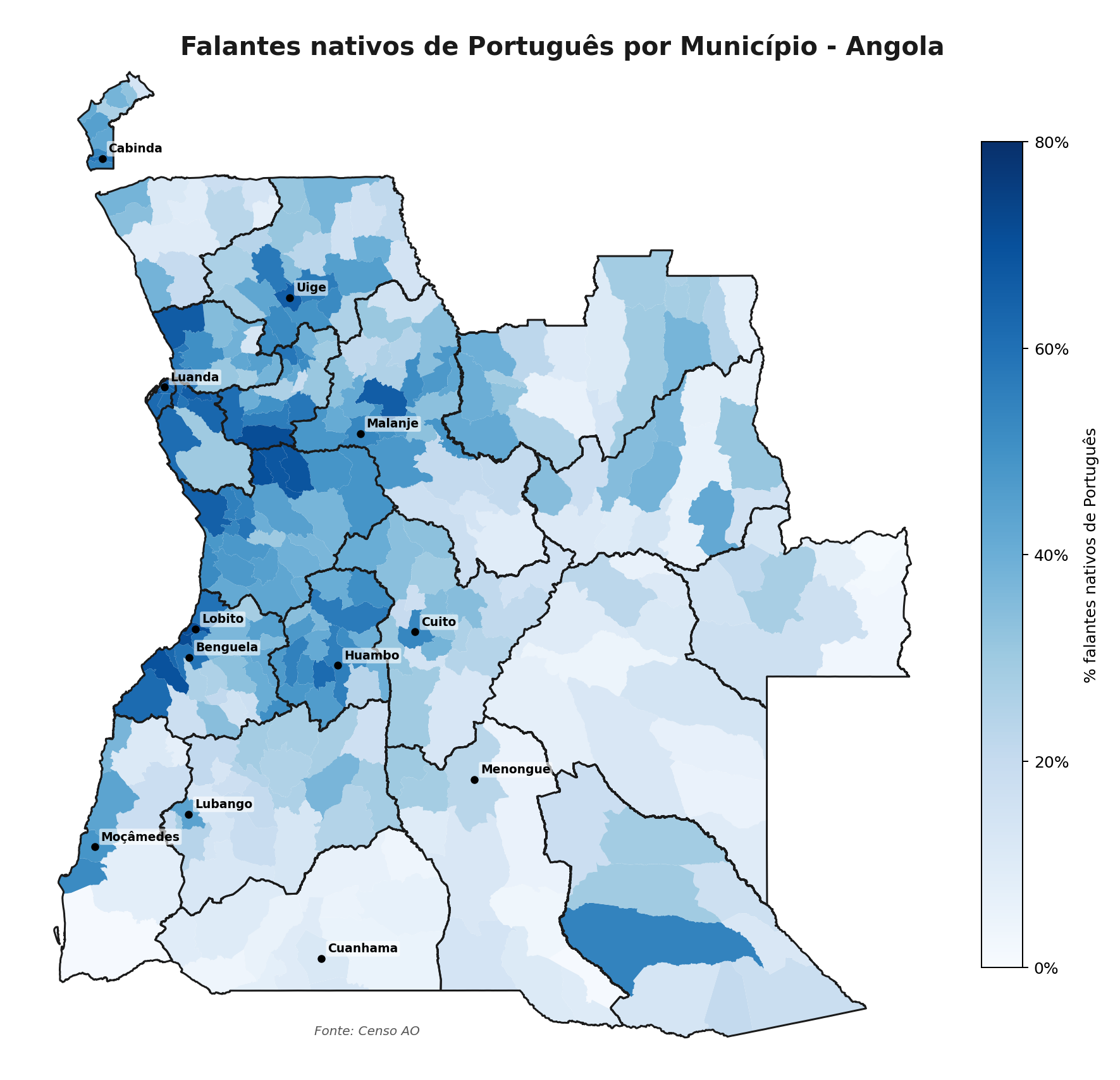
English: map of Angola – percentage of native speakers in each municipality.

==== Cape Verde ====
Similar to Guinea-Bissau, although Portuguese is the only official language, a Portuguese-based creole known as Cape Verdean Creole is spoken by the majority of the population. Most Cape Verdeans are fluent in Portuguese as well. Education and media are available largely in standard European Portuguese only.

==== Equatorial Guinea ====
Equatorial Guinea was a Spanish colony between 1778 and 1968 and was originally a group of Portuguese colonies between 1474 and 1778. A Portuguese creole is spoken by locals on the island of Annobón.

In 2007, President Teodoro Obiang Nguema announced a decision to make Portuguese the third official language of the country after Spanish and French. Despite government promotions, Portuguese remains rarely spoken in Equatorial Guinea, but increased political and trade relations with Portuguese-speaking nations (i.e. Brazil, Angola, Portugal) will soon increase the number of Portuguese speakers in the country. News, sports, and entertainment media in Portuguese will undoubtedly also facilitate increased comprehension. The majority of the population (~90%) still speaks Spanish as their primary language, and Spanish is still the administrative language and that of education, while French is the second official language.

==== Guinea-Bissau ====
Despite being the sole official language, only 50% of the population professes fluency in Portuguese. However, a Portuguese-based creole called Guinea-Bissau Creole (Kriol) is spoken by nearly the whole population as a lingua franca.

==== Mozambique ====
Portuguese is the sole official language of Mozambique and serves as a lingua franca between the various ethnic groups in the country. Slightly over 17% of the population are native speakers of Portuguese, totaling circa 5.8 million native speakers and making it the fourth biggest Portuguese native speaker community in the world right behind Brazil, Angola and Portugal. Also approximately 58.1% profess fluency, which amounts to almost 20 million speakers (a bigger community than Portugal if L2 speakers are counted). According to the 2017 Mozambican census, Portuguese is the second preferred native language (in first place is the Emakwa language spoken mostly in the northern provinces), being the main native language in both the Maputo province and the Maputo Capital in particular and a common second most spoken native language in the Gaza and Nampula provinces.

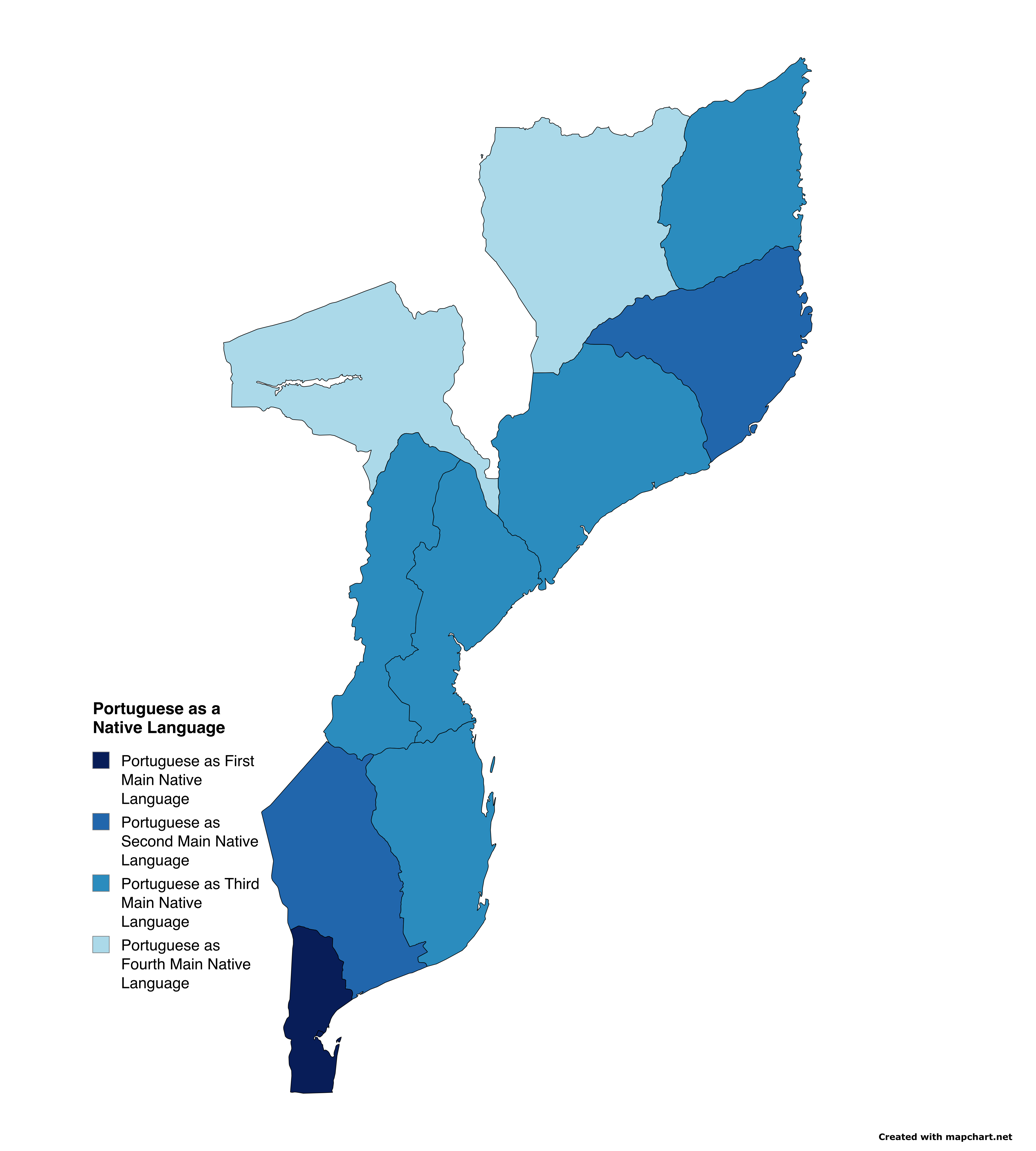
Portuguese as a native language in Mozambique – geographical distribution

The government, courts, education and most of Mozambican media is available solely in Portuguese, and the country receives several Portuguese and Brazilian television stations.

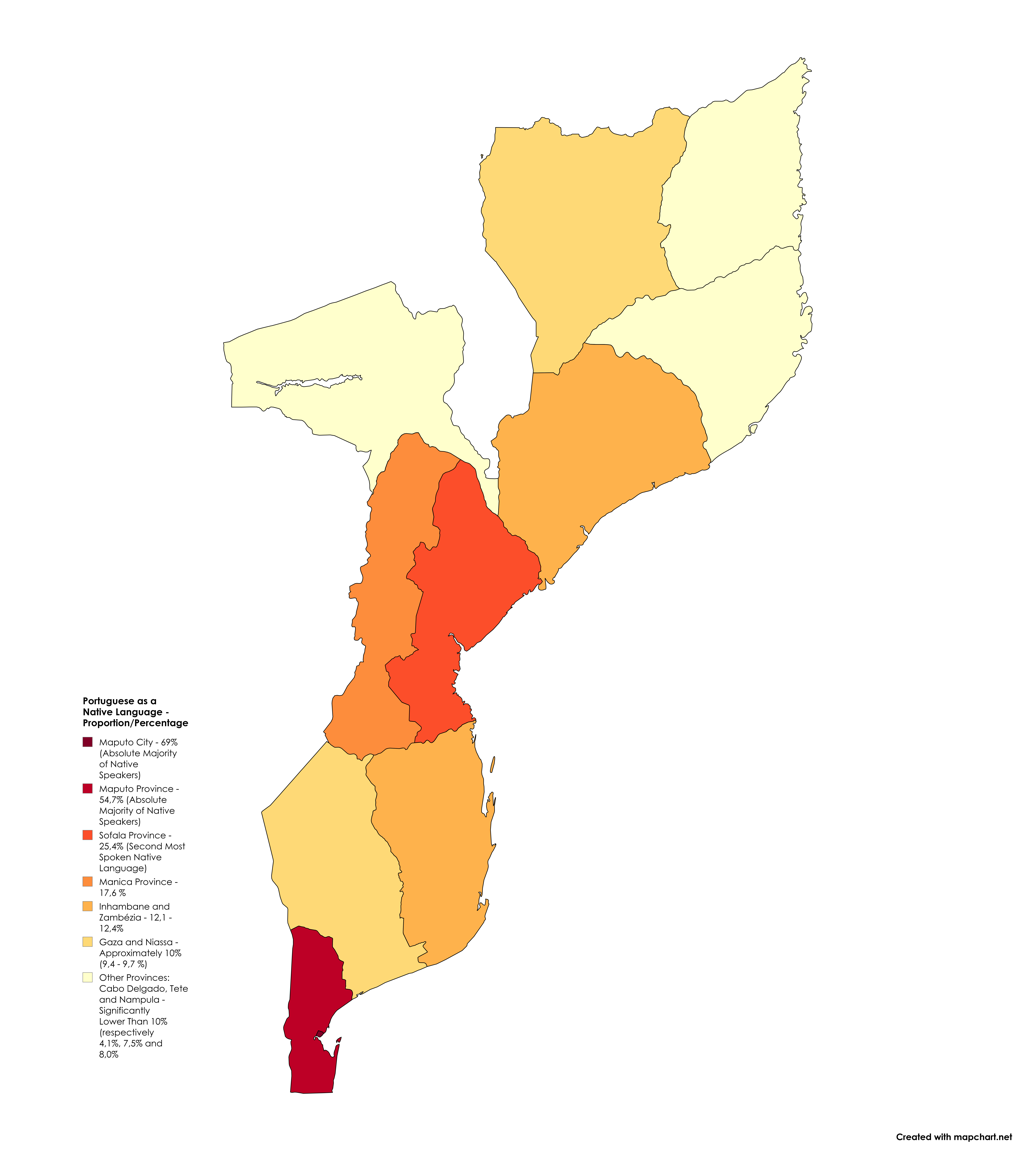
Portuguese as a native language in Mozambique – proportion of speakers

==== São Tomé and Príncipe ====
In São Tomé and Príncipe, Portuguese is by far the most spoken language, with around 95% of the population speaking it at home or professing fluency; 99.8% declared speaking Portuguese in the 1991 census. A Portuguese-based creole called Forro is also spoken.

==== Rest of Africa ====
Large Portuguese-speaking communities are found in Namibia, South Africa, and Zambia due to immigration from the Lusophone African countries. Portuguese is also taught in the schools of these countries.

=== Americas ===
==== North America ====
There are more than 1.5 million Portuguese Americans and about 300,000 Brazilian Americans living in the United States, and Portuguese is spoken by over 730,000 people at home in the country. There are over 500,000 people of Portuguese descent living in Canada; however, most of the community's population now speaks English or French as their primary language. Portuguese is also a primary language along with English in the British Overseas Territory of Bermuda.

In Mexico, mainly in the states of Jalisco, Quintana Roo, Yucatán, and Mexico City, there are small communities of speakers who are Brazilians. Portuguese, Cape Verdeans, Angolans, and Uruguayans are mainly from the Rivera Department.

A Portuguese-based creole known as Papiamento, is commonly spoken in the Dutch Caribbean islands of Aruba, Bonaire and Curaçao. It is the sole surviving Portuguese-based creole still in frequent use in the Americas and given official status.

==== South America ====
===== Brazil =====
With a population of over 212 million, Brazil is by far the world's largest Portuguese-speaking nation and the only one in the Americas. Portuguese was introduced during the Portuguese colonial period. Portuguese has also served as a lingua franca between the various ethnic groups in Brazil and the native Amerindian population after the Jesuits were expelled from every Portuguese territory and the languages associated with them prohibited.

Portuguese is the native and official language of the overwhelming majority of Brazilians, at 99.5%.

The form of Portuguese spoken in South America is somewhat different (mainly in accent) from that of spoken in Europe, with minor differences in vocabulary and grammar that can be compared to the differences between American and British English, but with somewhat different phonology and prosody from the remaining Portuguese-speaking countries. Nevertheless, European and Brazilian Portuguese are completely mutually intelligible. The vast majority of Brazilian characteristics are also found in some rural, remote Portuguese registers (or the African and Asian ones, indicating an Old Portuguese feature lost in Europe), while nearly all distinctive European characteristics can be found in any major dialect of Brazil (such as fluminense, specially its carioca sociolect, and florianopolitano), due to a stronger or more recent Portuguese and other European immigration.

Migration from Brazil also led to a great number of Portuguese speakers in the Southern Cone (especially Uruguay with portunhol da pampa), Paraguay (see brasiguayos), other regions of South America (especially Bolivia) except Venezuela, Japan (see Brazilians in Japan 400,000 and dekasegi, official numbers do not include second-generation Portuguese speakers and naturalized citizens), South Korea, the Philippines (see Brazilians in the Philippines), and Israel (see Aliyah from Latin America in the 2000s).

===== Rest of South America =====
Although Brazil is the only Portuguese-speaking nation in South America, it has the largest population, area and economy on the continent. Thus, the South American trade bloc Mercosul uses Portuguese alongside Spanish as its working languages. A Spanish influenced Portuguese dialect is spoken in the northern Uruguayan border area with Brazil. Given the proximity and trading relations between Portuguese speaking Brazil, and its respective Spanish speaking nations, Portuguese is offered as a foreign (sometimes obligatory) language course at most schools in Argentina, Bolivia, Paraguay, Uruguay, and Venezuela, and has become the second-most-studied foreign language (after English) in these countries.

In Guyana and Venezuela, there are communities of Portuguese immigrants (mostly Madeirans) and their descendants who speak Portuguese as their native language.

Given the similarities between Spanish and Portuguese, a colloquial mix of both, unofficially called "Portuñol" or "Portunhol", is spoken by a large number of people travelling between Brazil and its Spanish-speaking neighbours. People living in the border areas usually like Paraguay and Uruguay mix the two languages in their daily conversation, a phenomenon similar to Spanglish for Latinos living in the United States.

=== Asia ===
==== East Timor and Indonesia ====
Portuguese is co-official with Tetun in East Timor and was introduced during the colonial period. A little under 39% of the population professes fluency in Portuguese, and their number is steadily growing. Meanwhile, on the Indonesian side, it is rare to hear a Portuguese speaker because it lost in competition with the local language after becoming a Dutch colony in 18th century. The local Tetun language has been heavily influenced by Portuguese through loanwords, and code-switching between the two languages is common.

==== Goa (India) ====
Portuguese is present in the Indian state of Goa, which was a Portuguese colony until 1961. Although it was the sole official language during Portuguese colonial rule, it is mostly spoken by the elderly and educated populations today and is not an official language. Rather, Goa's official state language is Konkani, which has however picked up some Portuguese vocabulary as a legacy of Portuguese influence. Attempts to make Konkani be written in the Portuguese alphabet and reintroduce Portuguese as a co-official language of Goa have been made in recent years; presently Portuguese is officially taught there.

Portuguese rule in Daman and Diu has also left a smaller Portuguese influence on the territory. A Portuguese-based creole called Língua da Casa is spoken in the territory. As a result of the renewed interest in the Portuguese language and culture, the Portuguese language is making a comeback. Portuguese is still taught in some schools in Goa.

Portuguese people were also present in the area of Vasai, previously Bassein or Bacaim since 1560 until 1739. Though the Portuguese were defeated by Marathas, there are some words which are used by the locals which were borrowed from the Portuguese language. Today there is a large Catholic population, and many churches built during those days are still being used for worship.

==== Macau ====
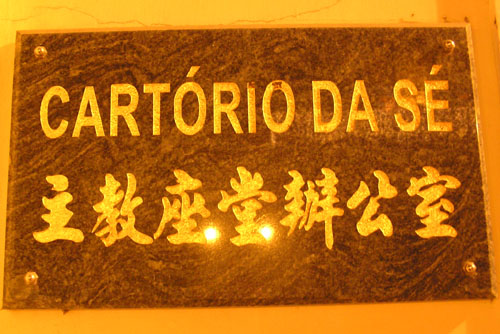
A sign in Macau translated in both official languages, Portuguese and Chinese

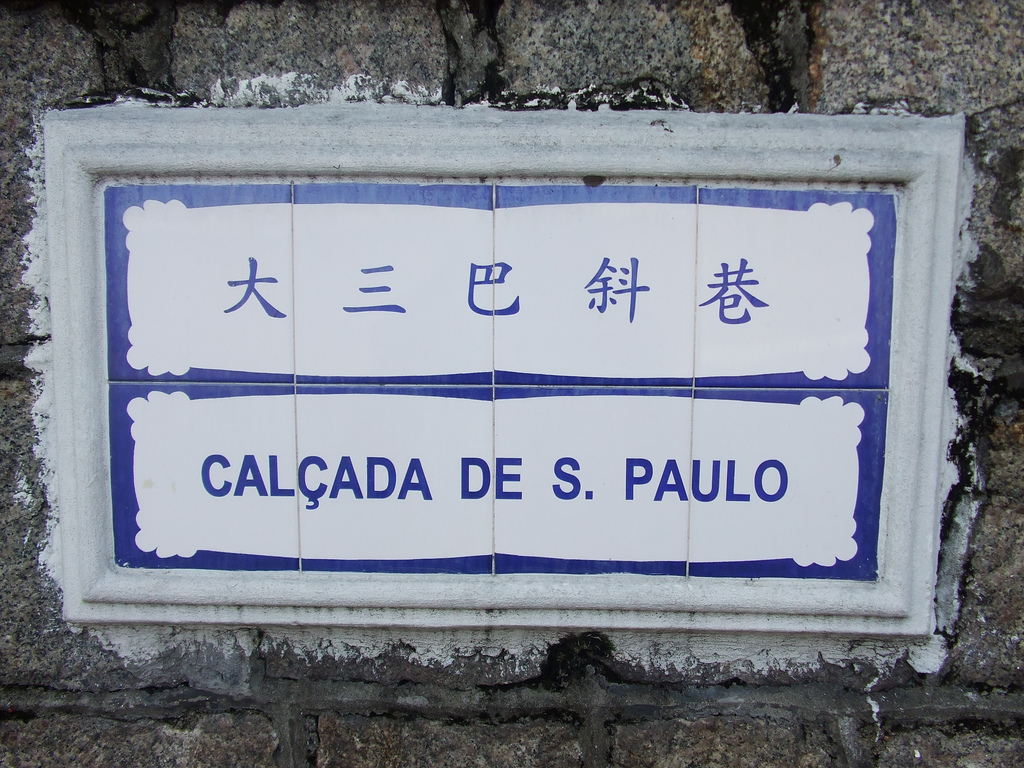
Portuguese and Chinese, seen on this street sign, are official languages in Macau.

Due to the one country, two systems policy of China regarding its special administrative regions, Macau is able to retain Portuguese as an official language alongside Cantonese.

Portuguese was first introduced to Macau when Portuguese traders established a permanent settlement there in 1537. Despite being a Portuguese colony for over four centuries, the Portuguese language was never widely spoken in Macau and remained limited to administration and higher education. It was spoken primarily by the Portuguese colonists, Macanese people of mixed ancestry, and elites and middle-class people of pure Chinese blood.

As a consequence, when Macau was handed back to China in 1999, Portuguese did not have a strong presence like English had in Hong Kong and continued its decline which began when Macau was still under Portuguese rule. Nevertheless, it was only after Portuguese rule ended that the Portuguese language in Macau began to see an increase in speakers due to China's increased trading relations with Lusophone countries.

Currently, there is only one school in Macau where Portuguese is the medium of instruction, the Macau Portuguese School, and Portuguese is also mainly taught in government schools. There has been an increase in the teaching of Portuguese owing to the growing trade links between China and Lusophone nations such as Portugal, Brazil, Angola, Mozambique, and East Timor, with 5,000 students learning the language.

Today, about 3% of Macau's population speaks Portuguese as a first language and 7% of the population professes fluency. Code-switching between Cantonese and Portuguese are commonly heard.

A Portuguese creole called Macanese (Patuá) was spoken by Macanese of mixed ancestry but is near extinction today.

==== Rest of Asia ====
Portuguese is spoken in Japan among returned immigrants (500,000) or migrant workers from Brazil known as dekasegi. Portuguese loanwords are also present in the Japanese language due to trading relations between Japan and the Portuguese Empire in the 16th century. Portuguese is now part of the curriculum in many Japanese schools, and many radio and television stations are broadcast exclusively in the Portuguese language.

In Malacca, Malaysia and Singapore (and a diaspora community in Perth, Australia) a Portuguese creole known as Papiá Kristang or Cristão is still spoken by some of the Eurasian population.

== See also ==
- Community of Portuguese Language Countries (CPLP)
- Glossary of Japanese words of Portuguese origin
- Latin America
- List of countries and territories where Portuguese is an official language
- List of international organisations which have Portuguese as an official language
- Portuguese-based creole languages
- Luso-American
- Portuguese creole
- Portuguese dialects
- Portuguese language
- Portuguese-speaking African countries (PALOP)
- Latin Europe
- World Portuguese Language Day
- Camões Prize
- List of link languages
- Dialect continuum
- Geolinguistics
- Language geography
