= Deolinda (disambiguation) =

Deolinda (Portuguese pronunciation: [diuˈlĩdɐ]) is a common Portuguese and Spanish name and surname and may also refer to:

== Religious figures ==
- Deolinda Correa, died in the civil war in 1840 of Argentina, and is a semi-pagan mythical figure in folk-religion of Argentina and Chile

== Culture ==
- Deolinda, a Portuguese quartet band
- Deolinda da Conceição (1914–1957), teacher, writer, translator and journalist of Macau
