= Demographics of Macau =

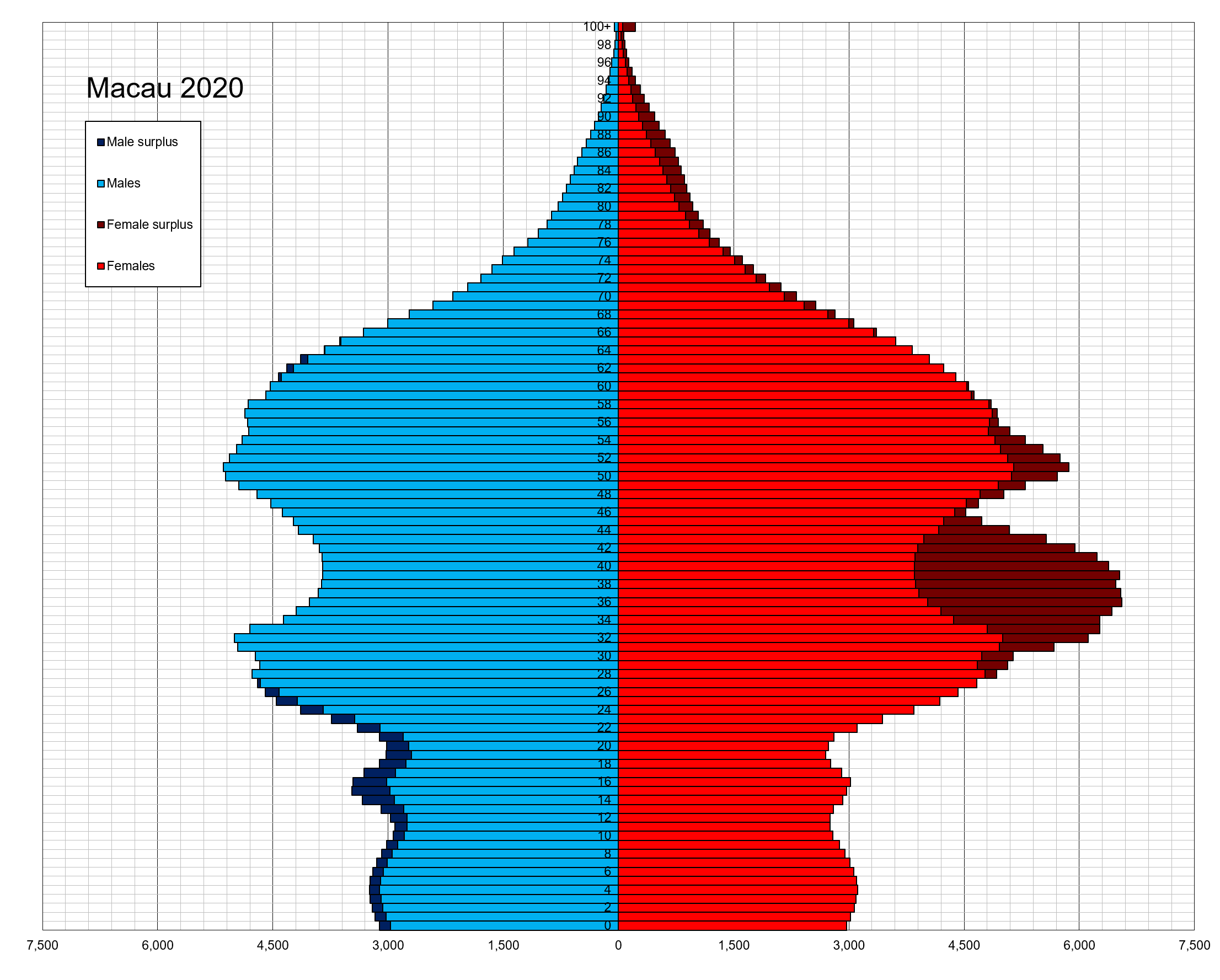
- Population pyramid of Macau in 2020
- Population: 644,426 (2024 est.)
- Growth rate: 0.67% (2024 est.)
- Birth rate: 8.6 births/1,000 population (2024 est.)
- Death rate: 4.9 deaths/1,000 population (2024 est.)
- Life expectancy: 85.3 years
  - male: 82.5 years
  - female: 88.3 years (2024 est.)
- Fertility rate: 1.24 children born/woman (2024 est.)
- Infant mortality: 4.4 deaths/1,000 live births (2024 est.)
- Net migration rate: 3.1 migrant(s)/1,000 population (2024 est.)

Age structure
- 0–14 years: 14.4% (male 47,346/female 45,216)
- 15–64 years: 69.9% (male 210,059/female 240,577)
- 65 and over: 15.7% (male 47,583/female 53,645) (2024 est.)

Sex ratio
- Total: 0.9 male(s)/female (2024 est.)
- At birth: 1.05 male(s)/female
- Under 15: 1.05 male(s)/female
- 65 and over: 0.89 male(s)/female

Nationality
- Nationality: Chinese
- Major ethnic: Cantonese people

Language
- Official: Cantonese 81%, Mandarin 4.7%, other Chinese dialects 5.4%, Portuguese 0.6%
- Spoken: English 3.6%, Tagalog 2.9%, other 1.8% (2021 est.)

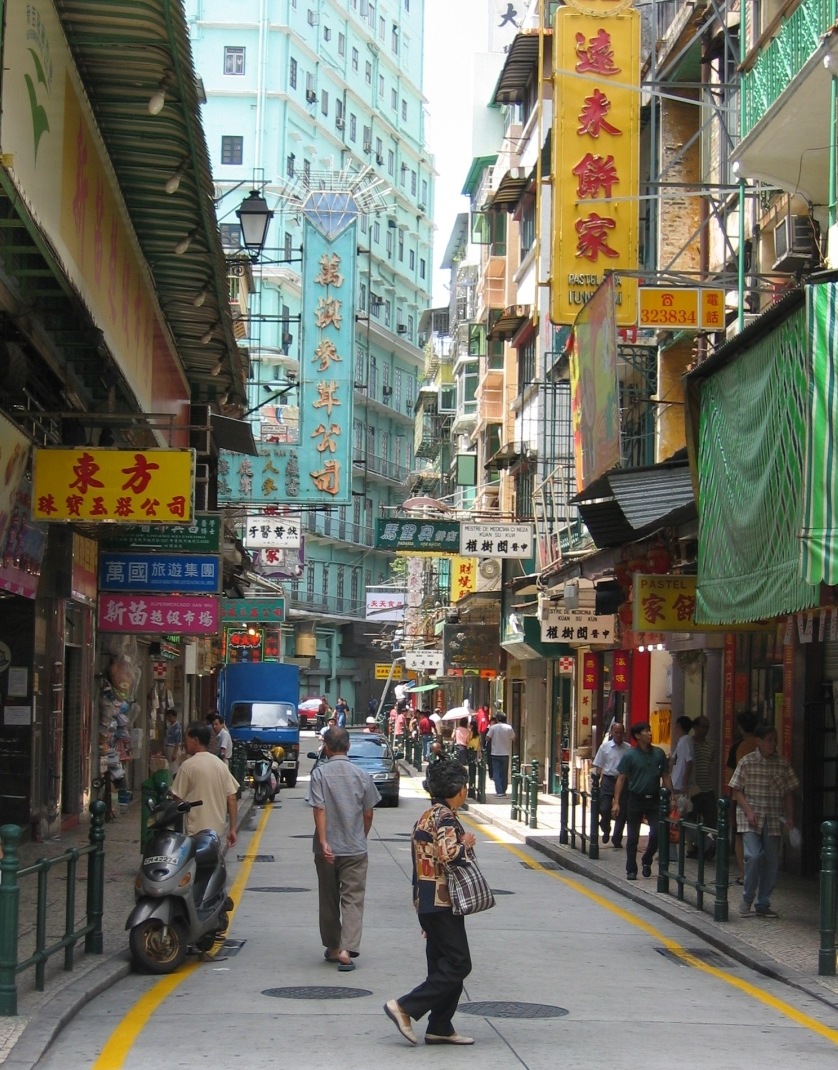
Street scene in Macau

Demographic features of the population of Macau include population density, ethnicity, education level, health of the populace, economic status, religious affiliations and other aspects of the population.

Macau's population is 95% Chinese ethnicity, primarily Cantonese and some Hakka, both from the nearby Guangdong Province. The majority of the remainder are of Portuguese or mixed Chinese-Portuguese ancestry. Some Japanese, including descendants of Japanese Catholics who were expelled by the shogunate, also live in Macau.

The official languages are Portuguese and Chinese. Most residents (85.7%) speak Cantonese; on the other hand, Mandarin is spoken by 3.2% at home, and about 40% are able to communicate in standard Mandarin. English and Portuguese are spoken as a first language by 1.5% and 0.6% respectively, while English is widely taught as a second language. The other popular topolect is Hokkien, spoken by a small percentage of the population. The creole Macanese language (Patuá or Macaista Chapado) is almost extinct.

== Population size and structure ==
624,000 (2014 Qtr2 est.)

=== Structure of the population ===
Population Estimates by Sex and Age Group (01.VII.2020):

Age group	Male	Female	Total	%
Total	326 700	358 700	685 400	100
0–4	16 700	15 300	32 000	4.67
5–9	18 000	16 200	34 200	4.99
10–14	12 900	11 500	24 400	3.56
15–19	12 700	12 300	25 000	3.65
20–24	22 100	22 100	44 200	6.45
25–29	25 800	24 800	50 600	7.38
30–34	35 900	39 000	74 900	10.93
35–39	30 900	35 100	66 000	9.63
40–44	23 500	27 300	50 800	7.41
45–49	22 300	28 800	51 100	7.46
50–54	19 600	28 200	47 800	6.97
55–59	23 800	30 300	54 100	7.89
60–64	22 800	23 900	46 700	6.81
65–69	16 500	17 200	33 700	4.92
70–74	11 500	11 100	22 600	3.30
75–79	5 500	5 300	10 800	1.58
80–84	3 300	4 300	7 600	1.11
85+	2 900	6 000	8 900	1.30
Age group	Male	Female	Total	Percent
0–14	47 600	43 000	90 600	13.22
15–64	239 400	271 800	511 200	74.58
65+	39 700	43 900	83 600	12.20

== Vital statistics ==
The following are data on vital statistics.

	Average population	Live births	Deaths	Natural change	Crude birth rate (per 1000)	Crude death rate (per 1000)	Natural change (per 1000)	Crude migration rate (per 1000)	TFR
1970	248,600	2,676	1,516	1,160	11.6	5.5	6.0		2.167
1971	246,200	2,637	1,543	1,094	10.9	5.5	5.4	-14.19	1.979
1972	243,900	2,750	1,539	1,211	10.3	5.4	4.9	-14.39	1.818
1973	241,700	2,686	1,410	1,276	10.0	5.4	4.6	-14.37	1.679
1974	239,400	2,781	1,579	1,202	9.7	5.4	4.3	-14.62	1.562
1975	237,000	2,583	1,398	1,185	9.7	5.4	4.3	-15.18	1.478
1976	234,200	2,369	1,517	852	10.2	5.4	4.7	-15.58	1.437
1977	231,700	2,532	1,424	1,108	11.0	5.5	5.6	-15.91	1.445
1978	233,100	2,407	1,360	1,047	12.4	5.5	6.9	1.51	1.499
1979	237,300	3,019	1,504	1,515	14.1	5.6	8.5	11.34	1.591
1980	242,000	3,784	1,555	2,229	16.0	5.6	10.4	10.21	1.709
1981	247,600	4,207	1,465	2,742	18.0	5.6	12.4	11.55	1.835
1982	261,700	5,262	1,488	3,774	19.8	5.6	14.2	39.33	1.953
1983	276,900	6,168	1,514	4,654	21.3	5.6	15.8	38.71	2.046
1984	288,800	6,666	1,488	5,178	22.4	5.5	16.9	23.24	2.104
1985	290,600	7,560	1,466	6,094	22.9	5.3	17.6	0.62	2.121
1986	301,500	7,477	1,324	6,153	22.9	5.2	17.7	15.75	2.094
1987	312,200	7,565	1,321	6,244	22.4	5.0	17.3	14.61	2.031
1988	319,800	7,913	1,437	6,476	21.5	4.9	16.6	3.51	1.944
1989	330,400	7,568	1,516	6,052	20.3	4.7	15.6	13.77	1.838
1990	339,500	6,872	1,482	5,390	19.0	4.5	14.5	10.91	1.722
1991	363,800	6,832	1,335	5,497	17.6	4.4	13.2	51.69	1.605
1992	378,000	6,676	1,432	5,244	16.2	4.3	12.0	23.69	1.494
1993	390,000	6,267	1,531	4,736	14.9	4.2	10.8	18.63	1.394
1994	403,600	6,115	1,330	4,785	13.8	4.1	9.7	21.82	1.308
1995	415,000	5,876	1,351	4,525	12.8	4.0	8.8	16.57	1.236
1996	415,200	5,468	1,413	4,055	12.0	4.0	8.0	-9.28	1.174
1997	419,400	5,031	1,293	3,738	11.1	3.9	7.2	1.10	1.116
1998	425,200	4,434	1,356	3,078	10.3	3.9	6.4	6.40	1.059
1999	429,600	4,148	1,374	2,774	9.6	3.9	5.7	3.79	1.002
2000	431,500	3,849	1,338	2,511	8.8	3.9	5.0	-1.41	0.95
2001	436,300	3,241	1,327	1,914	8.2	3.8	4.4	6.62	0.818
2002	440,500	3,162	1,415	1,747	7.7	3.8	3.9	5.57	0.813
2003	446,700	3,212	1,474	1,738	7.5	3.8	3.7	9.99	0.837
2004	462,600	3,308	1,533	1,775	7.4	3.8	3.6	30.51	0.855
2005	484,300	3,671	1,615	2,056	7.5	3.8	3.7	40.59	0.912
2006	509,900	4,058	1,566	2,492	7.8	3.8	4.0	45.32	0.954
2007	531,800	4,537	1,545	2,992	8.2	3.7	4.5	35.57	1.008
2008	543,100	4,717	1,756	2,961	8.7	3.7	5.0	15.36	0.979
2009	533,300	4,764	1,644	3,120	9.3	3.7	5.6	-24.82	1.004
2010	540,600	5,114	1,774	3,340	9.9	3.7	6.2	7.32	1.070
2011	557,400	5,852	1,845	4,007	10.4	3.7	6.8	23.01	1.150
2012	582,000	7,315	1,841	5,474	10.9	3.7	7.3	32.86	1.357
2013	607,500	6,571	1,920	4,651	11.4	3.7	7.7	34.32	1.150
2014	636,200	7,360	1,939	5,421	11.7	3.7	8.0	36.61	1.224
2015	646,800	7,055	2,002	5,053	12.0	3.8	8.2	8.57	1.142
2016	644,900	7,146	2,238	4,908	12.1	3.8	8.3	-10.55	1.138
2017	653,100	6,529	2,120	4,409	10.0	3.2	6.8	5.82	1.021
2018	667,400	5,925	2,069	3,856	9.0	3.1	5.9	15.64	0.915
2019	679,600	5,979	2,282	3,697	8.9	3.4	5.5	12.50	0.899
2020	683,100	5,545	2,230	3,315	8.1	3.3	4.8	0.27	0.841
2021	683,200	5,026	2,320	2,706	7.4	3.4	4.0	-3.81	0.756
2022	672,800	4,344	3,004	1,340	6.5	4.5	2.0	-17.75	0.680
2023	683,700	3,712	2,981	731	5.5	4.4	1.1	14.89	0.586
2024	688,300	3,607	2,477	1,130	5.2	3.6	1.6	5.04	0.582
2025	688,900	2,870	2,424	446	4.2	3.5	0.6	0.22	0.467

=== Current vital statistics ===
Period	Live births	Deaths	Natural increase
January – September 2025	2,130	1,826	+304
January – September 2026	2,037	1,957	+80
Difference	▼ -93 (-4.37%)	▲ +131 (+7.17%)	▼ -224

=== Fertility rate ===
Years	1920	1921	1922	1923	1924	1925	1926	1927	1928	1929
Total Fertility Rate in Macao	5.51	5.51	5.51	5.51	5.51	5.51	5.44	5.37	5.3	5.23

Years	1930	1931	1932	1933	1934	1935	1936	1937	1938	1939
Total Fertility Rate in Macao	5.16	5.09	5.02	4.95	4.88	4.81	4.74	4.67	4.6	4.53

Years	1940	1941	1942	1943	1944	1945	1946	1947	1948	1949	1950
Total Fertility Rate in Macao	4.46	4.39	4.32	4.25	4.18	4.11	4.04	3.97	3.9	3.83	4.05

=== Life expectancy at birth ===
Macau is the territory with the world's second highest life expectancy behind Hong Kong.

Period	Life expectancy in Years	Period	Life expectancy in Years
1950–1955	61.0	1985–1990	76.6
1955–1960	63.6	1990–1995	78.1
1960–1965	66.0	1995–2000	79.8
1965–1970	68.1	2000–2005	81.0
1970–1975	70.7	2005–2010	82.1
1975–1980	73.1	2010–2015	83.3
1980–1985	74.8		

Source: UN World Population Prospects

== Ethnic groups ==
The following are information on ethnicity and nationalities of residents based on data from the Statistics and Census Service.

Population of Macau according to ethnic group 1991–2021
Ethnic group	1991 census		2001 census		2011 census		2021 census	
Ethnic group	Number	%	Number	%	Number	%	Number	%
Chinese	338,191	95.1	416,353	95.7	510,383	92.4	609,863	89.4
Chinese & Portuguese	4,477	1.3	4,254	1.0	4,019	0.7	6,668	1.0
Portuguese	4,221	1.2	2,810	0.6	3,485	0.6	5,162	0.8
Chinese & non-Portuguese			1,771	0.4	1,601	0.3	1,498	0.2
Others	7,804	2.2	10,047	2.3	33,015	6.0	57,688	8.5
Portuguese & others			709	0.2	602	0.1	1,191	0.2
Total	355,693		435,235		552,503		682,070	

=== Place of birth ===
Population of Macau according to place of birth 1981-2021
Place of birth	1981 census		1991 census		2001 census		2011 census		2021 census	
Place of birth	Number	%	Number	%	Number	%	Number	%	Number	%
Macau	96,117	39.8	142,697	40.1	191,139	43.9	226,127	40.9	281,381	41.3
Mainland China	118,177	48.9	179,028	50.3	206,384	47.4	255,186	46.2	298,887	43.8
Hong Kong	13,118	5.4	12,192	3.4	14,436	3.3	19,355	3.5	22,199	3.3
Portugal	1,037	0.4	3,625	1.0	1,616	0.4	1,835	0.3	2,213	0.3
Philippines			1,965	0.6	5,311	1.2	14,544	2.6	32,900	4.8
Others	13,280	5.5	16,186	4.6	16,349	3.8	35,456	6.4	44,490	6.5
Total	241,729		355,693		435,235		552,503		682,070	

Immigration is an essential component of the population. Results of the 2011 Population Census indicated that 326,376 (59.1% of the total population) were born outside Macau, an increase of 3.0 percentage points over the last ten years. Analysed by place of birth, 255,186 (46.2%) were born in Mainland China, down by 1.2 percentage points from 2001. 226,127 (40.9%) were born in Macau, 19,355 (3.5%) in Hong Kong and 1,835 (0.3%) in Portugal. There were more persons born in other countries or territories as the number of non-resident workers increased. Among them, 14,544 were born in the Philippines, 7,199 in Vietnam and 6,269 in Indonesia, altogether taking up 5.1% of the total population. 1,942 were born in Europe other than Portugal, 2,252 in Americas, 959 in Africa and 672 in Oceania. Analysed by age group, 85.2% of the youth population (aged 0–14) were born in Macau, and 62.9% of those aged 35 and above were born in Mainland China.

As of 2011, 35,578 people in Macau were originally from Fujian province in Mainland China, making up about 25% of the Mainland China-born people. The number of Fujianese in Macau increased after the 1999 handover.

=== Nationality ===
Analysed by nationality, 509,788 (92.3% of the total population) were of Chinese nationality, down by 2.9 percentage points from the 2001 Census; meanwhile, only 0.9% was of Portuguese nationality, a decrease of 1.1 percentage points. These figures can be misleading, because more than a 100,000 people in Macau are holders of a Portuguese passport, making them in effect Portuguese citizens. Over the last ten years, diversity of the various components of the population is enhanced as economic development has drawn people to invest, work or study in Macau; consequently, 37,695 (6.8%) were of other nationalities, up by 4.0 percentage points, with 2.7% being Filipinos. Macau is a Chinese community and those of Chinese ethnicity totaled 510,383, an increase of 94,030 over the past ten years; however, its proportion to the total population decreased by 3.3 percentage points to 92.4%. Those of wholly or partly Portuguese ethnicity totaled 8,106, up slightly by 333 compared with 2001; its proportion to the total decreased by 0.3 percentage point to 1.5%.

== Religion ==
Religion in Macau
Religion	%
Chinese folk religion	30%
Buddhism, Taoism	10%
Christianity	5%
No affiliation	50%
Others	10%

Of the population, 30% practices Chinese folk religion, 10% Buddhism or Taoism, 5% Christianity, 50% no religion, 10% others (2009). Another survey conducted between 2005, 2007 and 2009 has found that 30% of the population follows folk faiths, 10% are adherents of Buddhism or Taoism, 5% are Christians, and the remaining part do not declare religious adherence.

== Languages ==
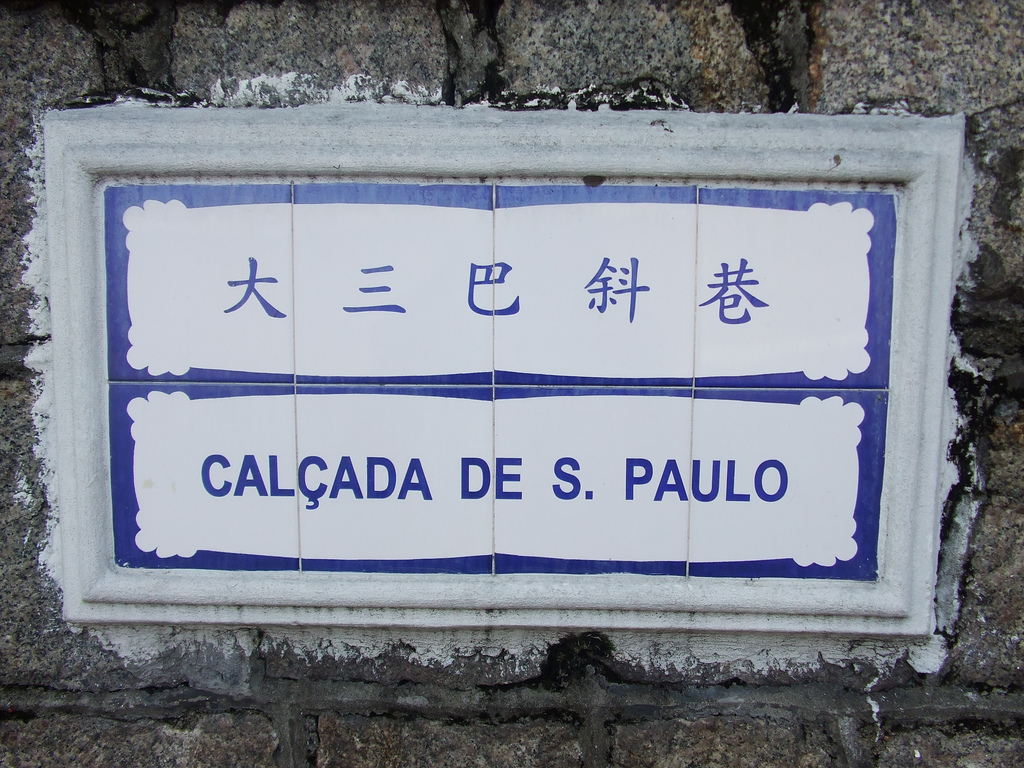
Portuguese and Chinese, seen on this street sign, are official languages in Macau

Portuguese and Chinese are official languages. The Chinese standard (Cantonese or Mandarin) is not specified in the law.

Population of Macau aged 3 and above according to usual language spoken at home
Language	1991 census		2001 census		2011 census		2021 census	
Language	Number	%	Number	%	Number	%	Number	%
Cantonese	289,297	85.8	372,697	87.9	449,274	83.3	537,981	81.0
Portuguese	6,132	1.8	2,813	0.7	4,022	0.7	3,949	0.6
Mandarin	4,016	1.2	6,660	1.6	27,129	5.0	31,405	4.7
English	1,777	0.5	2,792	0.7	12,155	2.3	23,635	3.6
Other Chinese Dialects	32,217	9.6	32,125	7.6	30,590	5.7	36,032	5.4
Tagalog			3,450	0.8	9,415	1.7	19,154	2.9
Others	3,838	1.1	3,666	0.9	6,546	1.2	11,626	1.8
Total	337,277		424,203		539,131		663,782	

Population of Macau aged 3 and above according to language spoken
Language	2001 census	2011 census		2021 census	
Language	%	Number	%	Number	%
Cantonese	94.4	485,061	90.0	572,402	86.2
Portuguese	3.0	13,148	2.4	15,137	2.3
Mandarin	26.7	223,180	41.4	298,807	45.0
English	13.5	113,803	21.1	150,359	22.7
Other Chinese Dialects	17.7	84,669	15.7	95,864	14.4
Tagalog		13,821	2.6	20,879	3.1
Others	4.3	25,161	4.7	25,053	3.8
Total	424,203	539,131		663,782	

== See also ==
- Macau people
