= Macanese people =

Mixed-race ethnic group originating in Macau

Maquista

Total population
- c. 42,000

Regions with significant populations
- Macau 8,000
- United States: 15,000
- Canada: 12,000
- Portugal: 5,000
- Hong Kong: 1,000
- Brazil: 300

Languages
- Macanese Patois, Macanese Portuguese, Cantonese

Religion
- Roman Catholicism · Buddhism · Evangelical Church • Islam

Related ethnic groups
- Portuguese diaspora · Cantonese people · Hong Kong people · Macau people · Tanka people · Sinhalese people · Japanese people · Malay people · Indian diaspora · Chinese Brazilian • Kristang people

Macanese people
- Chinese: 土生葡人
- Literal meaning: Native-born Portuguese people
Transcriptions
Yue: Cantonese
- Yale Romanization: tóu-saāng pòuh-yàhn
- Jyutping: tou2 saang1 pou4 jan4
- IPA: [tʰɔw˧˥ saŋ˥ pʰɔw˩ jɐn˩]

Alternative Chinese name
- Chinese: 土生澳門人
- Literal meaning: Native-born Macau people
Transcriptions
Yue: Cantonese
- Jyutping: tou2 saang1 ou3 mun2 jan4
- IPA: [tʰɔw˧˥ saŋ˥ ɔw˧ mun˧˥ jɐn˩]

Second alternative Chinese name
- Chinese: 麥境士
- Literal meaning: Homophonic transcription of Macanese
Transcriptions
Yue: Cantonese
- Jyutping: mak6 ging2 si6
- IPA: [mɐk̚˨ kɪŋ˧˥ si˨]

The Macanese people (Portuguese: Macaense; Macanese: Maquista) are an East Asian ethnic group that originated in Macau in the 16th century, consisting of people of predominantly mixed Cantonese and Portuguese as well as Malay, Japanese, Sinhalese, and Indian ancestry. Macanese people are often regarded as multiracial, but this is not always the case. The term has also been used to describe Portuguese and other Europeans who settled in Macau, as well as Chinese converts to Catholicism who adopted Portuguese names.

After World War II, many Macanese migrated out of Macau and dispersed all over the globe, causing their history and culture to become at risk of being lost.

== Name ==
In Cantonese, the lingua franca of Macau, the terms 澳門人 ('Macanese') and 土生葡人 ('native-born Portuguese') refer to the Macau people and the Macanese people, respectively. Although there were attempts by the colonial government during the mid-1990s to redefine the term "Macanese" as simply meaning a permanent resident, or as referring to anyone born in Macau regardless of ethnicity in accordance with Cantonese usage in, this did not succeed.

Consequently, the term "Macanese" is neither a term referring to the indigenous Tanka people of Macau, nor simply the demonym of Macau, but it instead refers to a specific minority ethnic group comprising approximately 1.2% of Macau's population. Due to the rise of localism among Macau people, following the 1999 handover "Macanese" is properly used to refer to people that were born in or live in Macau.

== Culture ==
Modern Macanese culture can be best described as a Sino-Latin culture. Historically, many ethnic Macanese spoke Patuá, which is a Portuguese-based creole and now nearly extinct. Many are fluent in both Portuguese and Cantonese. The Macanese have preserved a distinctive Macanese cuisine.

== History ==
=== Portuguese colonial period ===
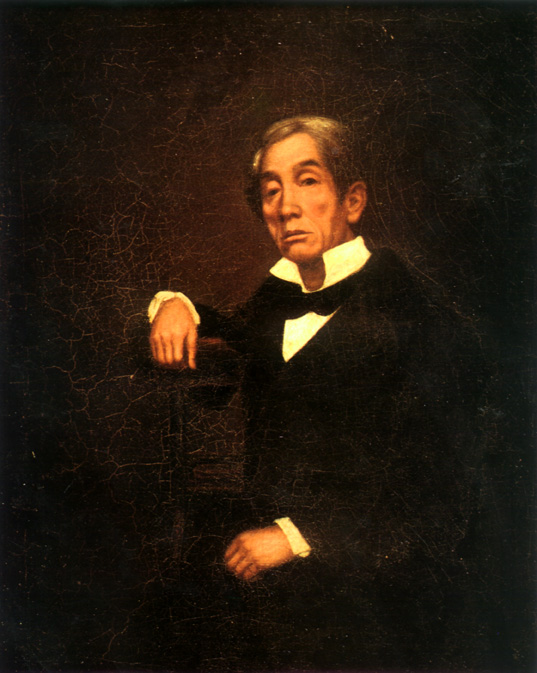
The Macanese, Miguel António de Cortela. Attributed to Lam Qua, early to mid-19th century.

Macau was founded circa 1557 by Portuguese merchants with permission of the Chinese Canton governor and later the emperor. Since its beginning, Macau has not been conquered and until the attacks of the Dutch in 1604, it didn't have a military garrison. Portuguese culture dominates the Macanese, but Chinese cultural patterns are also significant. The community acted as the interface between Portuguese merchant settlers or ruling colonial government – Portuguese who knew little about the Chinese – and the Chinese majority (90% of population) who knew equally little about the Portuguese. Some were Portuguese men stationed in Macau as part of their military service. Many stayed in Macau after the expiration of their military service, marrying Macanese women.

Rarely did Chinese women marry Portuguese; initially, mostly Goans, Ceylonese/Sinhalese (from Sri Lanka), Indochina, Malay (from Malacca), and Japanese women were the wives of the Portuguese men in Macau. Slave women of Indian, Indonesian, Malay, and Japanese origin were used as partners by Portuguese men. Japanese girls would be purchased in Japan by Portuguese men.

Macau received an influx of African slaves, Japanese slaves as well as Christian Korean slaves who were bought by the Portuguese from the Japanese after they were taken prisoner during the Japanese invasions of Korea (1592–98) in the era of Hideyoshi. From 1555 onwards, Macau received slave women of Timorese origin as well as women of African origin, and from Malacca and India. Macau was permitted by Pombal to receive an influx of Timorese women.

Many Chinese became Macanese simply by converting to Catholicism, and they had no ancestry from the Portuguese, having assimilated into the Macanese people since they were rejected by non-Christian Chinese. The majority of marriages between Portuguese and natives were between Portuguese men and women of Tanka origin, who were considered the lowest class of people in China and had relations with Portuguese settlers and sailors.

Western men like the Portuguese were refused by high class Chinese women, who did not marry foreigners. Literature in Macau was written about love affairs and marriage between the Tanka women and Portuguese men, like "A-Chan, A Tancareira", by Henrique de Senna Fernandes.

In the midst of the Manila Galleon trade, a small number of Latinos settled in the ports of Macau in China and Ternate in Indonesia which were secondary connecting trade nodes to the primary trade-route between Manila, Philippines and Acapulco, Mexico. They intermarried with the Portuguese settlers and Asian settlers. The first Latin American Asians were mostly Mexicans and to a lesser extent, Colombians and Peruvians who made their way to Asia, mainly the Philippines, in the 16th century. The Latin-Americans who were sent to the Philippines and Macau from the Spanish colonies in America were often Mulattoes, Mestizos and Indios (Amerindians).

Following the Shimabara Rebellion in 1638, about 400 Japanese Christians were officially deported to Macau or to the Spanish Philippines, and thousands more were pressured into voluntary exile. Among those Japanese Catholic refugees, many were fluent in Portuguese, even intermarried with Portuguese settlers & already existing Macanese settlers.

Much of the business conducted with foreign men in Vietnam was done by the local Vietnamese women, who engaged in both sexual and mercantile intercourse with foreign male traders. A Portuguese and Malay-speaking Vietnamese woman who lived in Macao for an extensive period of time interpreted for the first diplomatic meeting between Cochin-China and a Dutch delegation. She served as an interpreter for three decades in the Cochin-China court, with an old woman who had been married to three husbands, one Vietnamese and two Portuguese. The cosmopolitan exchange was facilitated by the marriage of Vietnamese women to Portuguese merchants. Those Vietnamese women were married to Portuguese men and lived in Macao, which is how they became fluent in Malay and Portuguese.

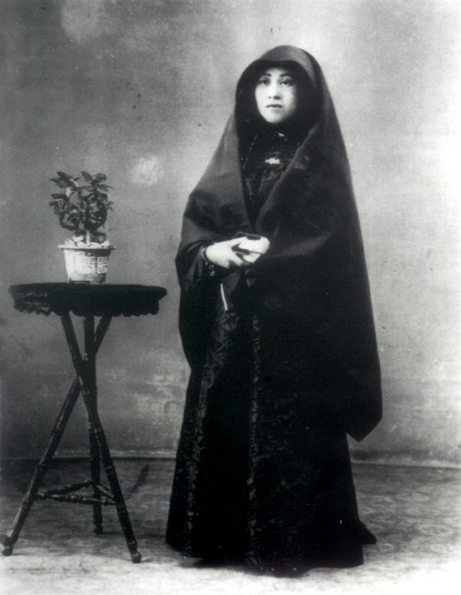
A Macanese senhora in her traditional attire, the dó, early 20th century

During the late-nineteenth century, and increasingly during Salazar's fascist Estado Novo regime, the upbringing of most Macanese fell along the lines of the continental Portuguese – attending Portuguese schools, participating in mandatory military service (some fought in Africa) and practising the Catholic faith. As recently as the 1980s, most Macanese had not received formal Chinese schooling and could speak but not read or write Chinese. Spoken Cantonese was largely familiar, and some spoke the language with a regional accent (鄉下話) – acquired largely from their mothers or amahs.

Since Portuguese settlement in Macau – dating from 1557 – included a strong Catholic presence, a number of Chinese converted to Catholicism. A large number of Macanese can trace their roots to these New Christians. Many of these Chinese were assimilated into the Macanese community, dropping their Chinese surnames and adopting Portuguese surnames. In the collective Macanese folk memory, there is a little ditty about the parish of St. Lazarus Parish, called 進教圍, where these Chinese converts lived: 進教圍, 割辮仔, 唔係姓念珠 (Rosário) 就係姓玫瑰 (Rosa).

Hence, it is surmised that many Macanese with surnames of Rosario or Rosa probably were of Chinese ancestry. Because of this, there are many Eurasians carrying Portuguese surnames Rosario, Rosa, and others that are not Portuguese-blooded may be mistaken by others as Portuguese-blooded, and Eurasians of Portuguese blood carrying Portuguese surnames trace their Portuguese blood on their maternal side.

A visit to the St Michael the Archangel Cemetery (Cemitério São Miguel Arcanjo), the main Catholic cemetery near the St. Lazarus Parish, would reveal gravestones with a whole spectrum of Chinese and Portuguese heritage: Chinese with Portuguese baptised names with or without Portuguese surnames, Portuguese married with Chinese Catholics, and so on.

The mid-twentieth century, with the outbreak of the Second World War in the Pacific and the retreat of the Republic of China to Taiwan, saw the Macanese population surge through the re-integration of two disparate Macanese communities: the Hong Kong Macanese and the Shanghai Macanese. With the Japanese invasion of Hong Kong in 1941, the Macanese population, escaping the occupation, made its way to Macau as refugees. These Macanese, including many skilled workers and civil servants, were fluent in English and Portuguese and brought valuable commercial and technical skills to the colony.

Another distinct group within the Macanese community is the 上海葡僑; the descendants of Portuguese settlers from Shanghai that acted as middlemen between other foreigners and the Chinese in the "Paris of the Orient". They emigrated from Shanghai to Macau in 1949 with the coming of the communist forces. Many spoke little Portuguese and were several generations removed from Portugal, speaking primarily English and Shanghainese, and/or Mandarin. The Shanghai Macanese carved a niche by teaching English in Macau. Only the children and grandchildren of Shanghainese settlers who were born and raised in Macau have the ability to speak Portuguese.

A number of Macanese also emigrated during the Carnation Revolution and Macau's handover to the People's Republic of China, respectively. Most potential emigrants looked to Brazil, Portugal's African territories, and Australia.

=== Post-colonial period ===
Beginning with the post-1974 independence of other Portuguese colonies and hastened by Macau's return to China, the Macanese community began to lose its Portuguese heritage. Many Portuguese, Eurasians and Chinese who were loyal to the Portuguese left after its return to China. Of those that remained, many children – including those of pure Chinese descent – switched from Portuguese- to English-medium high school education, particularly as many of parents recognised the diminishing value of Portuguese schooling. Many Macanese people of mixed ancestry since Portuguese time never speak Portuguese and speak only Cantonese as their first language; if other Macanese people of mixed ancestry speak Portuguese, they speak it as a second language, affected by a Cantonese accent.

At the same time, Macanese of pure Portuguese descent are also learning Cantonese and Mandarin to be able to communicate to non-Portuguese-speaking Chinese. Today, most Macanese – if they are still young enough – would go back to study to read and write Chinese. Many see a niche role for fluent speakers of Portuguese, Cantonese and Mandarin. Code-switching between Portuguese, Cantonese, and Mandarin among native speakers is common. In the 1980s, Macanese or Portuguese women began to marry men who identified themselves as Chinese.

== Macanese identity dispute ==
There is some dispute around the exact meaning of "Macanese". An essay by Marreiros offers a broad spectrum of "Macanese types", ranging from Chinese Christian converts who live among the Portuguese to the descendants of old-established families of Portuguese lineage; all groups are integrated into this historically legitimated group.

As a general rule, it is not a point of reference for ethnic Chinese living and raised in Macau. They often identify themselves as Chinese or Chinese from Macau. "Macanese" is applied to those people who have been acculturated through Western education and religion and are recognized by the Macanese community as being Macanese.

Traditionally, the basis for Macanese ethnic affiliation has been the use of the Portuguese language at home or some alliances with Portuguese cultural patterns and not solely determined along hereditary lines. Pina-Cabral and Lourenço suggest that this goal is reached "namely through the Portuguese-language school-system". Often, due to the close proximity to the Portuguese, the Macanese closely identify themselves with Portuguese nationals as opposed to Chinese in the bi-cultural and bi-racial equation. In practice, being Macanese is left up to how individuals categorize themselves.

In the mid-1990s, there had been attempts by the Macau government to redefine the Macanese to be everyone born in Macau regardless of ethnicity, language or nationality. Since the re-integration of Macau with the People's Republic of China in late 1999, the traditional definitions are in a state of re-formulation. Given the shifting political climate of Macau, some Macanese are coming to recognize and identify closer with a Chinese heritage.

This ambiguity might be reduced by the further adjective crioulo.

== Prominent Macanese ==
=== Arts and letters ===
- José dos Santos Ferreira – poet
- Deolinda da Conceição – journalist/writer
- Henrique de Senna Fernandes – lawyer/writer

=== Entertainment and sports ===
- Michele Monique Reis – Miss Hong Kong 1988, socialite and actress
- Maria Cordero – singer/actress
- Alexander Lee – U-KISS former member and now a solo artist.
- Joe Junior (actual name: Jose Maria Rodrigues Jr.) – veteran singer & TV actor
- Luísa Isabella Nolasco da Silva Leong Lok-yau – Hong Kong-based actress, singer, and model
- Isabelle Eleanor Chih Ming Wong – British–Macanese Cricketer.

=== Politics, military and business ===
- Colonel Vicente Nicolau de Mesquita – a commander of a group of 36 Portuguese soldiers, who won the battle of Passaleão, which was fought near the Portas do Cerco, against 400 Chinese soldiers, on August 25, 1849.
- Sir Roger Lobo – a businessman, former Hong Kong Legislative Council member and former Urban Council member, from the well known Macau's Lobo family.
- Pedro Nolasco da Silva – writer, translator, teacher, civil servant and politician.
- Arnaldo de Oliveira Sales – former member and chairman of the Urban Council, former president of the Olympic Committee of Hong Kong and former president of the Club Lusitano de Hong Kong.
- José Pedro Braga – manager of the Hongkong Telegraph between 1902 and 1910, chairman of China Light and Power Company in 1934 and 1938 and the first Portuguese member of the Legislative Council of Hong Kong, between 1929 and 1937.
- Clementina Leitão (黎婉華) – deceased wife of Stanley Ho. Also a member of one of pre-WWII Macau's wealthiest families
- Florinda da Rosa Silva Chan – current Secretary for Administration and Justice
- José Pereira Coutinho – jurist, Counselor of the Portuguese Communities, President of New Hope a pro-democracy party in Macau, President of Macau Civil Servants Association and Deputy of the Legislative Assembly of Macau
- Raimundo Arrais do Rosário – current Secretary for Transport and Public Works

=== Others ===
- Guilhermina, Geraldina, Isabela and Guiomar Pedruco (畢美娜、畢嘉寶、畢嘉麗、畢美淇), four sisters from the Pedruco family who won Miss Macau beauty pageant in 1989, 1995, 1993 and 1996 respectively.

== See also ==
- Kristang people
- Macau people
- Indian diaspora

== Bibliography ==
- Amaro, Ana Maria (1989). O Traje da Mulher Macaense, Da Saraca ao Do das Nhonhonha de Macau. Macau: Instituto Cultural de Macau.
- Amaro, Ana Maria (1993). Filhos da Terra. Macau: Instituto Cultural de Macau.
- Dicks, Anthony R. (1984). "Macao: Legal Fiction and Gunboat Diplomacy" in Leadership on the China Coast, Goran Aijmer (editor), London: Curzon Press, pp. 101–102.
- Guedes, João (1991). As seitas: histôrias do crime e da política em Macau. Macau: Livros do Oriente.
- Marreiros, Carlos (1994). "Alliances for the Future" in Review of Culture No. 20 July/September (English Edition), 162–172.
- Pina Cabral, João de (2002). Between China and Europe: Person, Culture and Emotion in Macao. New York and London: Berg (Continuum Books) – London School Monographs in Social Antrhropology 74.
- Pina Cabral, João de, and Nelson Lourenço (1993). Em Terra de Tufões: Dinâmicas da Etnicidade Macaense. Macau: Instituto Cultural de Macau.
- Porter, Jonathan (1996). Macau, the imaginary city: culture and society, 1557 to the present. Boulder: Westview Press.
- Teixeira, Manuel (1965). Os Macaenses. Macau: Imprensa Nacional.
- Watts, Ian (1997). "Neither Meat nor Fish: Three Macanse Women in the Transition" in Macau and Its Neighbors toward the 21st Century. Macau: University of Macau.
