= East Timorese Portuguese =

Variety of Portuguese language

- português timorense português de Timor-Leste
- Native speakers: 489,113 (2015)
- Language family: Indo-European: Italic; Latino-Faliscan; Latin; Romance; Italo-Western; Western Romance; Gallo-Iberian; Iberian Romance; West Iberian; Galician–Portuguese; Portuguese; East Timorese Portuguese

Official status
- Official language in: Timor-Leste
- Regulated by: Centro de Língua Portuguesa

Language codes
- ISO 639-3: –
- Glottolog: None
- IETF: pt-TL

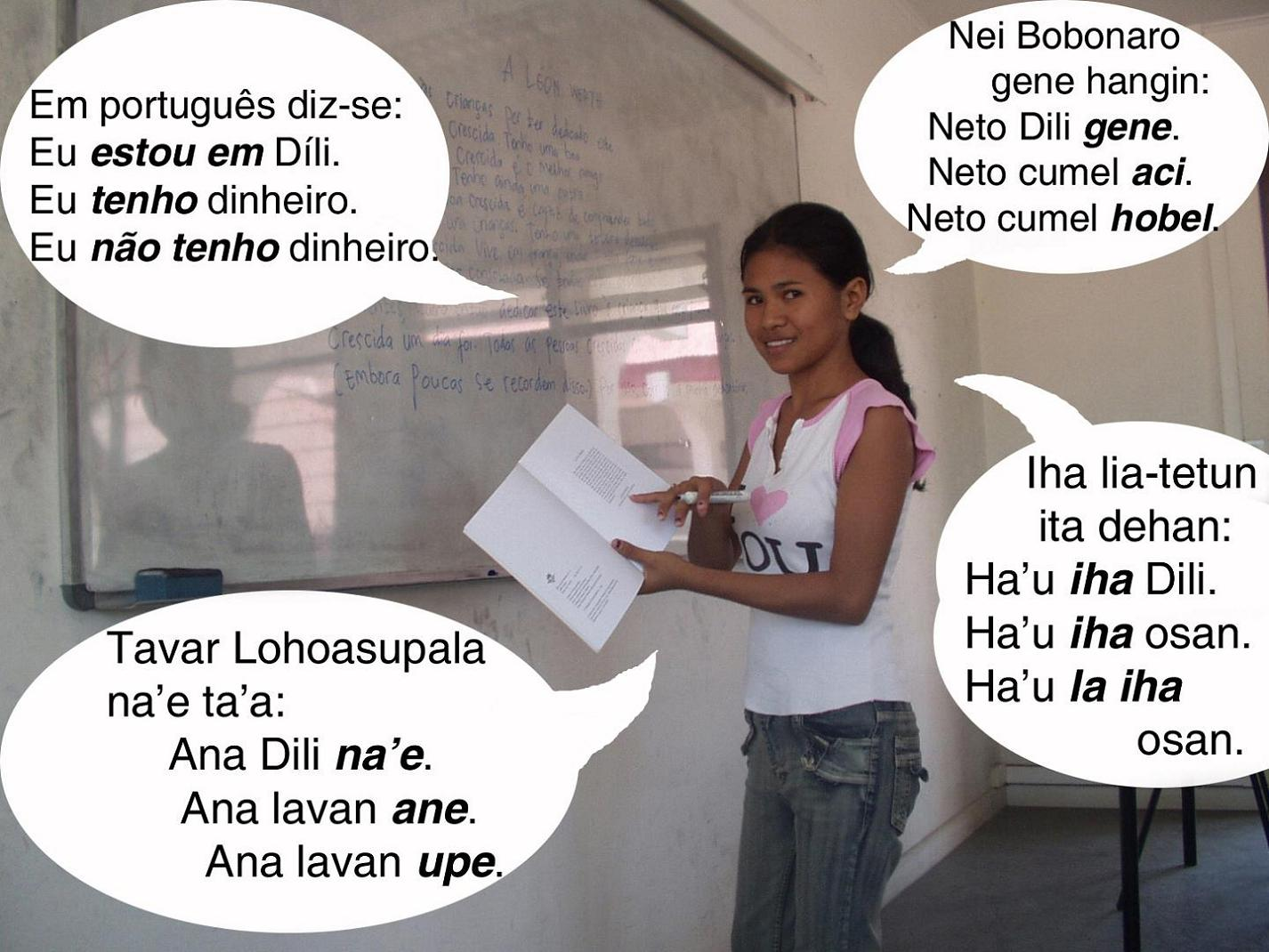
Learning in multilingual Timor-Leste, clockwise from left Portuguese, Bunak, Tetun and Fataluku

East Timorese Portuguese (Portuguese: português timorense) is the variety of the Portuguese language spoken in Timor-Leste. It is one of the official languages of Timor-Leste alongside Tetun. As with other Lusophone countries besides Brazil, the Portuguese language curriculum in Timor-Leste is based on European Portuguese, with some localisations in pronunciation. Timor-Leste is the only sovereign state in Asia with Portuguese as an official language (excluding Macau which is a special autonomous region of China). There is a growing demand for Portuguese-language courses in the country, both at early-learning and tertiary levels of education.

== History ==
Timorese Portuguese is a legacy of Portuguese rule of Timor-Leste (called Portuguese Timor) from the 16th century. It had its first contact during the Portuguese discoveries of the East, but it was largely exposed to Portuguese Timor in the 18th century after its division from the rest of the island by the Netherlands.

However, Tetun remained the main lingua franca of Timor-Leste during Portuguese rule, although the most commonly used form, known as Tetun-Prasa used in Dili, was heavily influenced by Portuguese. Following the Carnation Revolution in Portugal in 1974, political parties emerged in Portuguese Timor for the first time, all of which supported the continued use of Portuguese, including APODETI, the only party to advocate integration with Indonesia, which stated that it would support the right to "enjoy the Portuguese language" alongside Indonesian.

On 7 December 1975, nine days after declaring independence from Portugal, Timor-Leste was invaded by Indonesia, which declared the territory as its 27th province in 1976, with Indonesian as the sole official language. During the Indonesian occupation, the use of Portuguese in education, administration and the media was banned by the Indonesian authorities, which saw the language as a threat. This was despite the fact that the 'People's Assembly', which petitioned President Suharto for integration with Indonesia, conducted its proceedings in Portuguese, under a banner reading Integração de Timor Timur na República da Indonésia (Integration of East Timor into the Republic of Indonesia).

The last school to teach in Portuguese, the Externato São José, was closed in 1992.

The reintroduction of Portuguese as an official language aroused criticism amongst Indonesian-educated youth, but according to the 2004 census, 36.7% of respondents aged six years and older (or 272,638 out of a total of 741,530) said they had “a capability in Portuguese.”

== Social context ==
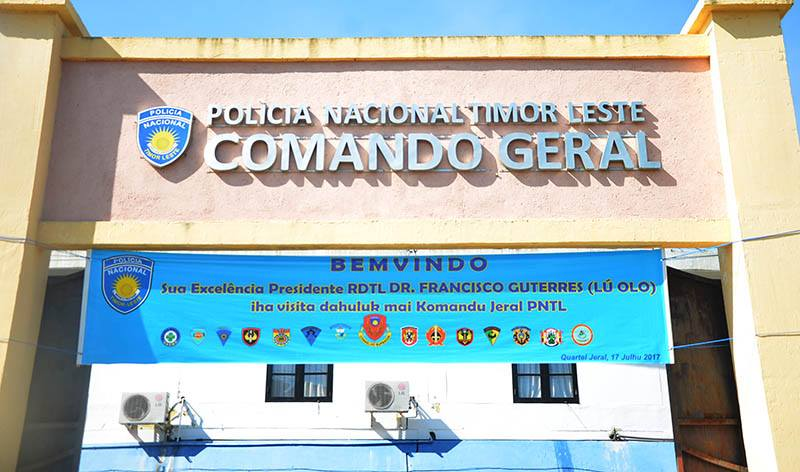
General command building of the National Police of Timor-Leste, Dili

After independence, Portuguese was restored by the new government of Timor-Leste as one of the official languages with Tetun, with Indonesian and English as "working languages". Timor-Leste asked for help from Brazil, Portugal, and the Latin Union to spread the teaching of the language, although its prominence in official and public spheres has been met with some hostility from younger Indonesian-educated East Timorese.

Some people in Timor-Leste have complained that teachers from Portugal and Brazil are poorly equipped to teach in the country, as they do not know local languages, or understand the local culture. Nevertheless, the late Sérgio Vieira de Mello, who headed the United Nations Transitional Administration in East Timor, was a Brazilian who not only established a close working relationship with Xanana Gusmão (the country's first president) as a fellow Portuguese-speaker, but was respected by many East Timorese because of his efforts to learn Tetun.

== Phonology ==
The Portuguese dialect of the East Timorese people is similar to other Lusophone Asian dialects, like the Indian, Malaysian and Indonesian ones, and to some extent, the African as well. The perceivable difference between Timorese Portuguese and the Portuguese spoken in Lisbon lies in the Timorese speaker's intonation, where a subtle Tetun-based tone carrying the Portuguese on top is found. The translation for "please" is por favor. It is [puʁ faˈvo] in Brazilian colloquial speech, [poʁ faˈvoʁ] or [poɾ faˈvoɾ] in Brazilian educated speech, [po faˈvo] in Timor-Leste, but [poɾ fɐˈvoɾ] in European Portuguese. Local government and schools are strict to teach European dialect, as Macau, Portugal and PALOP countries use, because European is the chosen pronunciation, the native pronunciation is closer to European than Mozambican even though it is midway between European and Mozambican dialects, so it is common for foreigners to hear [poɾ fɐˈvoɾ] being used in Timor-Leste. The Portuguese standard phonology is slightly affected by Tetun and other native languages, even though it is not a mother language of the population.

At the level of phonology, there are phenomena of metathesis, denasalization, resyllabification and variation in the realization of palatal consonants, such as /ʃ/ > pronounced as [sʲ] or [s]:

Ex. chegar (arrive) [se.ˈga.a] ~ [ˈsʲe.ga]; chá (tea) [sʲa]; bicho (bug) [ˈbi.su];

/ɲ/ > pronounced like [ɲ], [n], [nʲ], or [j]

Ex. vinho (wine) [ˈbi.nʲu] ~ [ˈvi.nʲu]; rascunho (draft) [ras.ˈku.nʲu] ~ [ras.ˈku.nju]; bonitinho (cute) [bo.ni.ˈti.ju] ~ [bo.ni.ˈti.nʲu];

Nasalization is a typological feature that does not exist in the native languages of Timor-Leste, and in many languages of the world as well. Thus, the Portuguese spoken in Timor broadly presents the phenomenon of denasalization, just as it does not present pre-nasalization (a phenomenon present in many varieties of Portuguese); some examples follow:

educação (education) [e.du.ka.ˈsa.u] ~ [e.du.ka.ˈsa.un] ação (action) [a.ˈsa.u] ~ [a.ˈsa.un] confissão (confession) [kon.fi.ˈsa.u] ~ [kon.fi.ˈsa.un]

In addition, the timorese usually palatalize the phoneme /ʒ/ to [z] or [dʒ], for example: ʒ > z já [za] ~ [dʒa]; vigésimo (twentieth) [vi.„zɛ.zi.mu] ~ [bi.„zɛ.zi.mu] ~ [vi.„zɛ.si.mu] ~ [bi.„zɛ.si.mu].

== Usage ==
Portuguese appears to be increasing in use by East Timorese. One study, identified as being only used at home by 11% of Timorese in 2002, but that had grown to a third of respondents using it as a language spoken at home, by 2019.

== Orthography ==
Timor-Leste uses the standard European Portuguese (português-padrão) spelling patterns: which is used by Portugal, PALOP and Macau.

== See also ==
- Kristang people
- RTP Internacional
- Mozambican Portuguese
- Macanese Portuguese
- Goan Portuguese
- Instituto Camões
