= José dos Santos Ferreira =

Macanese writer (1919–1993)

José dos Santos Ferreira, better known as Adé (28 July 1919, in Portuguese Macau – 24 March 1993, in Hong Kong), was a Macanese poet. He was a son of Portuguese father and a Cantonese mother. He was the last poet of distinction to write in Macanese (Patuá), the Portuguese-Cantonese creole.

Adé lived all his life in Macau and left behind a great body of work consisting of 18 books of poetry, prose, plays, operettas, and radio shows in Patua. Adé wrote, directed, and acted in his own productions.

== Partial bibliography ==
- Escandinávia, Região de Encantos Mil (1960).
- Macau sa Assi (in patois) (1968).
- Qui-nova chencho. Macau: Tipografia da Missão do Padroado (1974).
- Papiá cristá di Macau: Epitome de gramática comparada e vocabulário : dialecto macaense. Macau: [s.n.] (1978).
- Bilhar e Caridade (poetry) (1982)
- Macau di tempo antigo: Poesia e prosa: dialecto macaense. Macau: author's edition (1985).
- Poéma di Macau (poetry, em patois)(1983)
- 'Nhum Vêlo' (in patois) (1986)
- Poéma na língu maquista (Poesia em papel-de-arroz). Macau: Livros do Oriente (1992). ISBN 972-9418-10-1
