= Deolinda da Conceição =

Macanese writer and journalist (1914–1957)

Deolinda da Conceição (1914–1957) was the first woman writer and journalist in Macau. She was a Macanese (or Portuguese-descent), with Portuguese nationality.
