= Macanese Portuguese =

Variety of Portuguese language

- português macaense
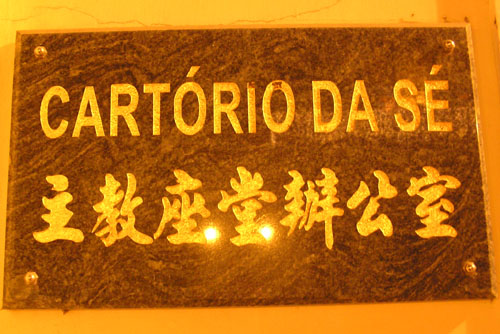
- Bilingual sign in Macau
- Native speakers: 6,200 in Macau (2014)
- Language family: Indo-European: Italic; Latino-Faliscan; Latin; Romance; Italo-Western; Western Romance; Gallo-Iberian; Iberian Romance; West Iberian; Galician–Portuguese; Portuguese; Macanese Portuguese
- Writing system: Latin (Portuguese alphabet); Portuguese Braille

Official status
- Official language in: Macau

Language codes
- ISO 639-3: –
- Glottolog: None
- IETF: pt-MO

Macanese Portuguese (Portuguese: português macaense) is the Portuguese language as spoken in Macau, where Portuguese is a co-official with Cantonese. Macanese Portuguese is spoken, to some degree either natively or as a second language, by roughly 2.3% of the population of Macau. It should not be confused with Macanese Patois (or patuá), a distinct Portuguese creole that developed in Macau during the Portuguese rule.

== History ==
Portugal officially occupied Macau in 1887 after signing the Sino-Portuguese Treaty of Peking. Nevertheless, during the Portuguese Macau period, Portugal did not promote Portuguese to its Chinese inhabitants. According to Macao Yearbook, there were 107 Chinese-language schools (that accordingly followed Confucian education principles) out of 129 total in 1927, showing that most Chinese did not primarily learn Portuguese.

Macau Pidgin Portuguese
- Native speakers: None
- Language family: Portuguese–based pidgin
- Dialects: produced Macanese Patois

Language codes
- ISO 639-3: –
- Glottolog: maca1264

The sovereignty of Macau was transferred from Portugal to the People's Republic of China in 1999, but Portuguese remained an official language. Although Portuguese use as a whole was in decline in Asia during the early 21st century, notably after Macau was ceded to China in 1999, there has been an increase in the teaching of Portuguese mostly due to East Timor's (closest Portuguese-speaking country to Macau) boost in the number of speakers in the last five years, but also because of the Chinese authorities' preservation of Portuguese as an official language in Macau, owing to the growing trade links between China and Lusophone nations such as Portugal, Brazil, Angola, Mozambique, and East Timor, with 5,000 students learning the language alone.

== Features ==
=== Phonology ===
The Macanese dialect was traditionally an Old Portuguese variety. However, it nowadays closely follows the standard European dialect in pronunciation and vocabulary. The only Portuguese-curriculum school teaches in the standard European dialect, as do institutions in most of the CPLP such as East Timor. There are still some phonological differences affected by Cantonese phonology made by those who speak Portuguese as a second language, such as a non-rhotic accent: final /ɾ/ in infinitive verbs is dropped (cf. comer 'to eat', dormir 'to sleep, but not mar 'sea'), as in African Portuguese and most Brazilian speakers, and [ʒ] is devoiced to [ʃ], a trait almost unique to Macau. These phonological differences do not apply to Chinese who have higher education in Portuguese.

=== Lexicon ===
Macanese Portuguese shares much of its vocabulary with Portugal, but there are some differences due to Cantonese influence. Macau Portuguese also borrowed words from Malay and from other Indo-European languages like Sinhalese, Konkani, and Marathi languages; these influences date back several centuries, as Portuguese settlers often married women from Portuguese Malacca, Portuguese India, and Portuguese Ceylon rather than from neighboring China. In the 17th century, it was further influenced by the influx of immigrants from other Portuguese colonies in Asia, especially from Portuguese Malacca, Indonesia, Portuguese Ceylon (whose inhabitants had been displaced by the Dutch expansion in the East Indies), and Japanese Christian refugees. These include lexical shifts like tim sam, dim sum; goh lor, goh low; and shu tiu, si tiu. These changes later reached countries and regions where Portuguese is spoken, especially Portugal, where it was brought by Portuguese returnees and some Chinese and Macanese loyal to them who brought Chinese and Macanese culture. Its influence even reached Brazil through the movements of Portuguese settlers also accompanied by Chinese and Macanese.

=== Orthography ===
Macau was not a party to the Portuguese-Language Orthographic Agreement of 1990 and thus retains older spellings no longer used in other lusophone countries.

== See also ==
- East Timorese Portuguese
- Goan Portuguese
