= Macanese Patois =

Portuguese-based creole spoken by a minority in Macau

- Patuá
- Native to: Macau
- Ethnicity: Macanese
- Native speakers: 50 in Macau (2007) perhaps hundreds or more than a thousand among the Macanese diaspora; virtually all speakers at least bilingual; total speakers: 5,000 (2007; in Macau)
- Language family: Portuguese–Cantonese creole: Macanese Patois

Language codes
- ISO 639-3: mzs
- Glottolog: maca1262
- ELP: Patuá
- Linguasphere: 51-AAC-ai
- Location map of Macau

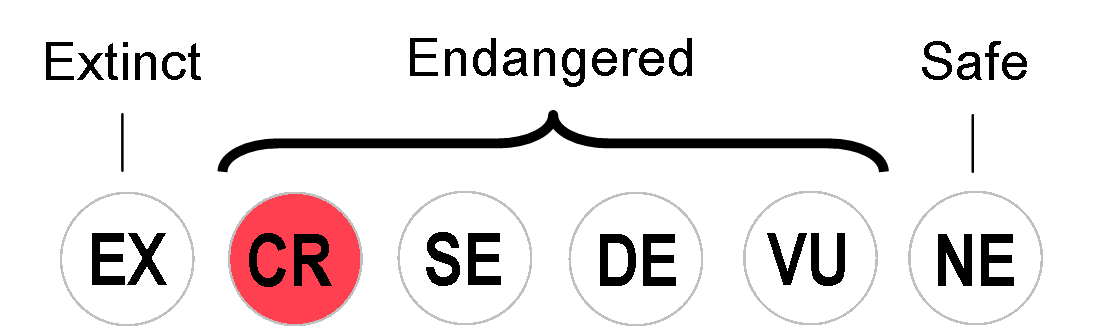
- Macanese Patois is classified as Critically Endangered by the UNESCO Atlas of the World's Languages in Danger.

Macanese patois (Macanese: Patuá), also called Maquista, is a Portuguese-based creole language with a substrate from Cantonese, Malay and Sinhala, which was originally spoken by the Macanese community of the Portuguese colony of Macau. It is now spoken by a few families in Macau and in the Macanese diaspora.

UNESCO Atlas of the World's Languages in Danger classifies Patua as a "Critically Endangered" and places the number of speakers at 50 as of 2000.

Because of its historical development, it is closely related to other Portuguese- and Malay-influenced creoles of Southeast Asia, notably the Kristang language of Malacca and the extinct Portuguese-influenced creoles of Indonesia and Flores, as well as to the Indo-Portuguese creoles of Sri Lanka and India.

== Name ==
The language is also called by its speakers as papia Cristam di Macau ("Christian speech of Macau") and has been nicknamed dóci língu di Macau ("sweet language of Macau") and doci papiaçam ("sweet speech") by poets.

In Chinese, it is called "澳門土生葡語" ("Macanese language") or "土生土語" ("native-born dialect/patois"). In Portuguese, it is called macaense, Macaista chapado ("pure Macanese"), or o patuá (from French patois).

The term "澳門話" ("Macanese speak") in Chinese, the lingua franca of Macau, refers to any language of Macau (such as the Tanka dialect of Yue Chinese, Standard Cantonese with Macau unique phrases and expressions, Macanese, Portuguese with Macau accent, Hakka, etc.) and the Macanese language, respectively. Although there have been attempts by the Portuguese Macau government in the mid-1990s to redefine the Portuguese and English term "Macanese" as Macau Permanent Resident (anyone born in Macau regardless of ethnicity, language, religion or nationality), in accordance with the Chinese (Cantonese) usage, this did not succeed. Consequently, the Portuguese and English term "Macanese" refers neither to the indigenous people of Macau (Tanka people) nor to the demonym of Macau, but to a distinctive ethnicity (1.2% of the population) special to Macau.

== History ==
=== Origins ===
Patuá arose in Macau after the territory was leased by Portugal in the mid-16th century and became a major hub of the Portuguese naval, commercial, and religious activities in East Asia.

The language developed first mainly among the descendants of Portuguese settlers. These often married women from Portuguese Malacca, Portuguese India and Portuguese Ceylon rather than from neighbouring China, so the language had strong Malay and Sinhala influence from the beginning. In the 17th century, it was further influenced by the influx of immigrants from other Portuguese colonies in Asia, especially from Portuguese Malacca, Indonesia, and Portuguese Ceylon, that had been displaced by the Dutch expansion in the East Indies, and Japanese Christian refugees.

=== Evolution ===
Like any other language, Macanese underwent extensive changes in usage, grammar, syntax, and vocabulary over the centuries, in response to changes in Macau's demographics and cultural contacts. Some linguists see a sharp distinction between the "archaic" Macanese, spoken until the early 19th century, and the "modern" form that was strongly influenced by Cantonese. The modern version arose in the late 19th century, when Macanese men began marrying Tanka women from Macau and its hinterland in the Pearl River delta. The British rule of Hong Kong from the mid-19th century also added many English words to the lexicon.

Over its history the language also acquired elements from several other Indian tongues and a string of other European and Asian languages. These varied influences made Macanese a unique "cocktail" of European and Asian languages.

Macanese lawyer and Patuá supporter Miguel Senna Fernandes has said that Patuá was "not yet dead, but the archaic form of Patuá has already died", adding that "modern" Patuá could be considered a "dialect derived from archaic Patuá." He also underlined the fact that "modern" Patuá has been strongly influenced by Cantonese, namely since the beginning of the 20th century, adding that it was "quite a miracle" that Patuá has been able to survive for four centuries in Macau, considering that "Chinese culture is quite absorbing."

"Let's revive an almost lost memory," Fernandes said about efforts by Patuá aficionados to ensure the survival of Macau's "sweet language" that, after all, is part of its unique history.

=== Cultural importance ===
The language played an important role in Macau's social and commercial development between the 16th and 19th centuries, when it was the main language of communication among Macau's Eurasian residents. However, even during that period the total number of speakers was relatively small, probably always amounting to just thousands, not tens of thousands of people.

Macanese continued to be spoken as the mother tongue of several thousand of people, in Macau, Hong Kong and elsewhere, through 19th and early 20th century. At that time, Macanese speakers were consciously using the language in opposition to the standard Portuguese of the metropolitan administration. In the early 20th century, for example, it was the vehicle of satirical sketches poking fun at Portuguese authorities. A few writers, such as the late poet José dos Santos Ferreira ("Adé"), chose the "sweet language" as their creative medium.

On the other hand, Macanese never enjoyed any official status, and was never formally taught in Macau. Starting in the late 19th century, its role in the life of the colony was greatly diminished by the central government's drive to establish standard Portuguese throughout its territories. High-society Macanese gradually stopped using it in the early 20th century, because of its perceived "low class" status as a "primitive Portuguese". All people, including many Chinese learning Portuguese as their second or third language, are required to learn standard European Portuguese. Other Macanese people learn Cantonese, another language with co-official status with Portuguese in Macau. Because of this, code switching even occurs between the Creole, standard Portuguese, and Cantonese in informal speech.

=== Present status ===
Macanese use was already in decline while Macau was a Portuguese territory, and that situation is unlikely to improve now that the territory is under Chinese administration. Still, its speakers take great pride in the fact that Macau has its own local language, something that Hong Kong does not have. They argue that Macau's unique status as a 500-year-old bridge between Orient and the Occident justifies deliberate efforts to preserve the Macanese language. The language is included in UNESCO's Atlas of the World's Languages in Danger.

In spite of its unique character and centuries-old history, Macanese has received scant attention from linguists. Philologist Graciete Nogueira Batalha (1925–1992) published a number of papers on the language. A Macanese-Portuguese glossary was published in 2001.

In the 21st century, some younger Macanese are making efforts to rejuvenate Patuá, especially by using it in original music and drama.

=== Modern Macanese ===
Modern Macanese differs rather greatly from Macanese spoken during and before the first half of the 20th Century. The modern variety can be said to have taken its shape after the 1950s, with Macanese literature of the time still more or less recognizable today. In addition to strong influences from Cantonese, Portuguese has re-asserted its influence to a degree, both in vocabulary and in phonology.

Older words borrowed from Malay or South Asian sources may be supplanted by Portuguese words. For example, sezâ ("sun") from Marathi सूर्य (sūrya) appears to have become all but archaic even in the later half of the 20th century, replaced by the Portuguese sol. Other such words may take on extended meanings, such as sapeca, from Malay sa + paku (lit. "one coin thread"), which formerly only meant "coin", but is now the most common word meaning "money".

In other cases, Macanese has undergone a certain degree of decreolization, with Portuguese-derived words losing their extended meanings; for example agora, from Portuguese agora ("now"), formerly also had the senses of "at the same time" and "since", however modern Macanese almost exclusively uses the word simply to mean "now". In other cases of decreolization, a word derived from a Portuguese regional variant may be discarded in favour of the modern standard Portuguese word, such as janela replacing older jinela, meaning "window".

Increasingly, ⟨m⟩ before a consonant is also simply pronounced /m/ rather than as /ŋ/, despite ⟨m⟩ being a nasalizing consonant in Portuguese. For example, empê ("to stand up"), from Portuguese em pé /ɐ̃j̃ ˈpɛ/, is more likely to be pronounced /emˈpɛ/ or /imˈpɛ/ rather than /eŋˈpɛ/ or /iŋˈpɛ/. ⟨n⟩ before a consonant however generally remains nasalized as /ŋ/, with the exception of most Cantonese loanwords. It has also been found that in the consonant clusters ⟨nd⟩, ⟨nj⟩, ⟨nt⟩, and ⟨nz⟩ where ⟨z⟩ is pronounced /d͡ʒ/, the pronunciation of ⟨n⟩ also becomes /n/, for example úndi ("where") being pronounced /ˈun.di/ rather than /ˈuŋ.di/, or tanto ("much") being pronounced /ˈtan.tu/ or /ˈtɐn.tu/ rather than /ˈtaŋ.tu/. Older dictionaries, such as the Glossário Do Dialecto Macaense (1988), generally record pre-consonant ⟨m⟩ with nasalization, such as notating ambá as [ą̃bą́] rather than say [ąmbą́], despite ambá (modern ambâ or ambâc) deriving from English humbug where /m/ is not nasalized.

In addition to lexical contributions, Cantonese has also significantly influenced the grammar of modern Macanese; one example is the common usage of vai (lit. "to go") before verbs, which parallels the Cantonese usage of 去, which in addition to "to go" can also mean "to go in order to do something".

Younger Macanese (under the age of 60), who may be less fluent in Macanese and more fluent in Cantonese, may even write full sentences using outright Cantonese syntax. For example, the sentence Êle falâ amanhâm vai Hotê Lisboa dále dôs mám ("He says that tomorrow he will go to Hotel Lisboa to gamble") may be translated word-for-word into/from Cantonese as 佢話聽日去葡京酒店賭兩手, with the exact same syntax. In addition, de-diphthongized words may sometimes be re-diphthongized in alignment with the Portuguese origin word, for example using the Portuguese form suor ("sweat") rather than the documented monophthongal sôr, or lei ("law") rather than the expected de-diphthongized form *lê; compare the latter with the word rê ("king"), from Portuguese rei.

== Geographic distribution ==
Macanese is the now nearly extinct native language of the so-called Macanese people, Macau's Eurasian minority, which presently comprises some 8,000 residents in Macau (about 2% of its population), and an estimated 20,000 emigrants and their descendants, especially in Hong Kong, Brazil, California, Canada, Peru, Costa Rica, Australia, Portugal and Paria peninsula of Venezuela. Even within that community, Macanese is actively spoken by just several dozen elderly individuals, mostly women in their eighties or nineties, in Macau and Hong Kong, and only a few hundred people among the Macanese Diaspora overseas, namely in California.

== Lexicon ==
=== Malay ===
A sizeable amount of the Macanese lexicon derives from Malay, through various Portuguese-influenced creoles (papiás) like the Kristang of Malacca and the creole spoken in the Indonesian island of Flores. Words of Malay origin include sapeca ("coin; money"), copo-copo ("butterfly"), and santám ("coconut milk").

=== Sinhala and South Asian languages ===
Many words also came from Sinhala, through the Indo-Portuguese creoles of the Kaffir and Portuguese Burgher communities of Sri Lanka. Some terms are derived from other Indian languages through other Indo-Portuguese creoles brought by natives of Portuguese India, these include Konkani and Marathi languages. Examples of words from these sources include fula ("flower") and lacassá ("vermicelli").

=== Dutch ===
A few words in Macanese also come from Dutch, likely through Malay or Indonesian. An example is cacús ("toilet, outhouse") deriving from Dutch kakhuis, probably via Indonesian kakus.

=== Japanese ===
There are also a few words in common Macanese use that are ultimately of Japanese origin, for example sutate ("soy sauce"), possibly derived from すったて (suttate), a regional dish from Shirakawa prepared by mixing stone-ground soybeans with a miso and soy-sauce-based broth. Such words may have entered Macanese through the Japanese Catholic population which settled in the Pátio do Espinho during the 17th and 18th centuries. For instance, miçó ("salt and soybean paste"), from Japanese miso, was recorded in the Ou-Mun Kei-Leok published in 1751.

=== Cantonese ===
Cantonese contributions include amui ("(Chinese) girl") coming from 阿妹 ("little sister") and laissi ("gift of cash") coming from 利是 ("red packets").

In some cases, there may be two words in Macanese meaning the same thing but of different origins, for example pâm (from Portuguese pão) and min-pau (from Cantonese 麵包) both meaning "bread". In this particular case, min-pau is the more common word, however this may vary with other cases. In addition, pâm is also used in some fixed phrases, such as pâm-di-casa (lit. "home bread"), a type of sweet bread that is/was typically baked at home by Macanese. Another instance is the name for the country Portugal, where some Macanese may simply refer to it as Portugal, but more commonly, the country is referred to as Saiong, a borrowing from Cantonese 西洋 ("the West", lit. "western sea").

In addition to directly borrowing words, one somewhat common feature is the calquing of phrases from Cantonese into Macanese, for example nê-bôm (negative imperative particle, "don't") derived from Portuguese não é bom ("it is not good"), but actually semantically being a calque of Cantonese 唔好 ("don't", lit. "not good").

Some words may be derived from (Indo-)Portuguese but take on senses of related words from Cantonese, for example vangueâ ("to faint; to feel dizzy") originally coming from Indo-Portuguese bangueiro ("drunk; high") but being supplanted semantically by Cantonese 暈 ("dizzy; to feel dizzy"); or caréta ("car; any kind of vehicle") coming from Portuguese carreta ("cart") but being semantically supplanted by Cantonese 車, with the same meaning as the Macanese term. Even the word for "money", sapeca, may be a semantic loan from Cantonese 錢, as the term used to only refer to coins with square holes in the middle (compare the French cognate sapèque).

Aspiration is usually not taken into account when loaning Cantonese words into Macanese, that is, words with [pʰ], [tʰ], [kʰ] (Jyutping: p, t, k) and [p], [t], [k] (Jyutping: b, d, g) are both borrowed as p, t, c/qu, making the aspirated consonants [pʰ, tʰ, kʰ] assimilate to the unaspirated ones. For example, syun3 pun4 (算盤) and min6 baau1 (麵包) are borrowed into Macanese as sin-pun and min-pau respectively, noting that both words use ⟨p⟩ as opposed to the latter being borrowed as *min-bau. Likewise, [t͡s] (Jyutping: z) and [t͡sʰ] (Jyutping: c) are usually both borrowed into Macanese as ch, for example gwaa1 zi2 (瓜子) and caau2 caau2 naau6 naau6 (吵吵鬧鬧) are borrowed into Macanese as quachí and chau-chau-lau-lau respectively, rather than the former being borrowed as *guazí. Note however that the syllable-initial N-L alternation as displayed by naau^{6} → lau is a regular allophonic phenomenon in Cantonese, rather than a specific effect arisen from the Macanese orthographic merging of aspirants and non-aspirants.

=== English ===
English-derived terms include adap (from "hard-up", meaning "short of money"), afêt ("fat"), anidiu ("honeydew (melon)"), and possibly gudám ("store", "shop" from Malay gudang, but also the sense "downstairs" possibly deriving from English go down).

There are also a few terms calqued from English, for example tiro-grandi ("an important person") being a calque of big shot.

Older terms may have entered Macanese through Indo-Portuguese, for example tifinâ ("to have lunch") coming from English tiffin which is an especially commonplace term in Indian English, while newer English-derived terms have almost certainly entered Macanese through Hong Kong English, such as chop or chope in the sense of "stamp" or "seal", which is not only found in Hong Kong English but also in Hong Kong Cantonese.

=== Portuguese ===
The Portuguese contribution to the lexicon came mainly from the dialects of southern Portugal. For example, chomâ ("to call") likely deriving from a dialectal variant of standard Portuguese chamar.

Otherwise, verbs derived from Portuguese tend to lose their -r endings. -ar, -er and -ir usually become -â, -ê and -í. In some cases, verbs may be derived from the first- or third-person singular present form rather than the infinitive, for example vivo ("to live") coming from Portuguese vivo ("I live, I am living") rather than the infinitive viver. Likewise, vêm ("to come") and têm ("to have") deriving from Portuguese vem ("he/she/it/they (sg.) is/are coming") and tem ("he/she/it/they (sg.) has/have"), rather than the infinitives vir and ter, which would have yielded *ví and *tê. On the other hand, compare rí ("to laugh") and crê ("to believe") from Portuguese rir and crer respectively. Depending on the age of a Macanese derivation, it may also lose ⟨-r-⟩ after a consonant as well, for example Portuguese escrever became Macanese isquevê ("to write").

Some Macanese formations are derived from Portuguese (or older Galician-Portuguese) terms that are not found in modern standard Portuguese, for example nádi (negative future particle, "will not") deriving from Portuguese não há-de ("(there) will not be"). Portuguese words may also be used in different and/or expanded senses, for example nunca (Portuguese "never") being used with a more general sense of "not" as well as the interjection "no", while nunca-si (lit. "no if") is used for "never"; or olâ (from Portuguese olhar, "to look") also bearing the meanings of "to see", "to watch", and even sometimes "to understand". There are also some particles found in Macanese which are not found in modern Portuguese, but which survives in other Romance languages; for example, namás or na-más ("just; only; no more") corresponding to Asturian namás, Catalan només, Romanian numai, and Latin American Spanish nomás, or pramor di ("because of") corresponding to Galician por mor de and Gascon pr'amor de, literally "for the love of".

Some words with now-obsolete senses in Portuguese may retain those senses in Macanese. For example, azinha means "quickly" in Macanese, and derives from Portuguese asinha, which is speculated to have gone out of common Portuguese use after the 18th century. Depending on the case, Portuguese slang and jargon word variants may become the most common form used in Macanese, for example puliça ("police officer") derived from Portuguese polícia.

In addition to inherited terms from Indo-Portuguese, it is also speculated that Macanese has been influenced by Portuguese varieties and creoles spoken in Africa. For example, Portuguese direito ("fair, just") becomes drêto in Macanese, very similar in form to the Kabuverdianu dretu ("correct"), also descended from the same Portuguese word.

In some cases, non-Portuguese terms may be combined with Portuguese-derived grammatical particles to form terms unique to Macanese, for example English park + Macanese -â (from Portuguese -ar) → parcâ ("to park (a vehicle)"). Conversely, Portuguese-derived terms may also combine with non-Portuguese grammatical particles to form Macanese terms, for example amor (Macanese, Portuguese "love") + Cantonese -仔 zai^{2} (diminutive suffix) → amochâi ("sweetie, darling"), or Portuguese avô ("grandfather") + Cantonese 公 gung^{1} ("paternal grandfather; old man") → Macanese avô-cong ("grandfather").

Depending on the scenario, some speakers may perform code-switching, where certain (usually more complicated) concepts are expressed using Portuguese; or Portuguese interjections may be used in a Macanese sentence, for example Calôr qui pidí misericórdia ("it's so hot", lit. "heat asking for mercy"), where misericórdia comes from Portuguese. Otherwise, nationalities and names of countries are generally directly borrowed from Portuguese.

In Macanese, to speak in a Portuguese-influenced manner (i.e., to use Portuguese expressions or a Portuguese accent), is referred to as portuguesado or portuguezado, which for instance may be used in the phrase falâ portuguesado ("to speak in a Portuguese way").

Where Portuguese has influenced Macanese, Macanese may also influence the Portuguese dialect as spoken by ethnic Macanese. Reportedly, words like chuchumeca ("troublemaker") and vangueado ("fainted") may be used by (especially older) Macanese when speaking Portuguese.

=== Spanish ===
Some Macanese terms were also derived from Spanish. Words of Spanish origin came via a small number of Latinos who settled in the ports of Macau amidst the Manila Galleon trade. Because Spanish and Portuguese are both Iberian Romance languages, many words may be similar and the real origin may not be clear. For instance, adiós ("goodbye") may directly derive from the Spanish adiós with no apparent intermediate in Portuguese adeus; or chiste ("joke") deriving from Galician or Spanish chiste. Some words may instead derive from Spanish via Portuguese, for instance panhâ ("to take") from Spanish apañar via Portuguese apanhar; or xicra ("teacup") from Spanish jícara (ultimately of Nahuatl origin) via Portuguese xícara.

While certain de-diphthongized words exist in forms similar to their Spanish counterparts, such as Portuguese dous ("two") becoming dôs in Macanese (compare Spanish dos), it is uncertain the extent to which Spanish may have actually influenced said de-diphthongization process, and the similar resultant vowel may largely be a coincidence.

=== Backslang ===
There is also some backslang in Macanese, for example náchi deriving from china, both meaning "a Chinese thing/person".

== Phonology ==
The phonology of Macanese is relatively similar to European Portuguese, however there is a slightly tonal or sing-songy quality, possibly as an influence of Malay and/or Cantonese. Unlike Cantonese however, the tones largely do not differentiate otherwise homophones. In addition, spoken Macanese appears to be syllable-timed, like Brazilian Portuguese, but unlike European Portuguese which is stress-timed.

=== Consonants ===
⟨s⟩ before a consonant or word-finally may be pronounced either as /s/ or /ʃ/, the latter a feature influenced by European Portuguese. The usage of /ʃ/ is recorded at least as early as the 1980s, as recorded in the Glossário Do Dialecto Macaense (1988). ⟨s⟩ between vowels is usually pronounced /z/, same as in Portuguese; and word-initial ⟨s⟩ followed by a vowel, ⟨-ss-⟩, and ⟨ç⟩ are all pronounced /s/.

Portuguese ⟨lh⟩ /ʎ/ tends to become just /l/, for example Macanese mulé ("woman") derived from Portuguese mulher, although the variation mulier /-lj-/ also exists, cf. Kristang muleh. In some cases, this may be due to Macanese inheriting directly from Old Galician-Portuguese ⟨ll⟩. ⟨nh⟩ /ɲ/ however is generally retained, for example fucinho /fuˈsiɲu/ ("snout") from Portuguese focinho, although some speakers may use /nj/ instead.

Also, /ʃ/ and /ʒ/ generally tend to be pronounced as /t͡ʃ/ and /d͡ʒ/ respectively, although /t͡ʃ/ is always used for words of Cantonese or Malay origin containing ⟨ch⟩ (c /t͡ʃ/ in Malay, /t͡sʰʲ/ [t͡ɕʰ] or /t͡sʲ/ [t͡ɕ] in Cantonese). Another difference is that ⟨d⟩ is almost exclusively pronounced as [d] (or even un-aspirated [t] as in Cantonese), as opposed to /ð/ in European Portuguese or /d͡ʒ/ in Brazilian Portuguese in certain positions.

⟨h⟩ is treated differently depending on the borrowing source (if any); for Portuguese words, it is generally spelled but not pronounced in full Portuguese words, for example hómi from Portuguese homem, but tends to be dropped in compound words, e.g. amestê from Portuguese há mester. For English words, the ⟨h⟩ is also silent, but is generally also not written out at all, for example anidiu from honeydew, or ambâc from humbug. The only case in which ⟨h⟩ is not silent is with Cantonese loanwords, for example hám-chói from Cantonese haam4 coi3 (鹹菜). In this case, ⟨h⟩ is simply pronounced /h/, a sound familiar to almost all Macanese, as modern Macanese still living in Macau are all proficient in Cantonese to some degree.

==== Pronunciation of R ====
The pronunciation of ⟨r⟩ depends on the speaker; before a vowel or between vowels, it is almost always pronounced /ɾ/, although /ʁ/ may be found word-initially with some speakers. After a vowel word-finally or before a consonant, it is always dropped in verbs and reflected as such in writing (cf. lugâ above, although older texts from the 20th century may still retain the -r in writing), and depending on the speaker, it may be dropped when used in certain Portuguese words even with ⟨r⟩ retained in spelling, or simply pronounced /ɾ/ as previous.

As mentioned earlier, words such as isquevê may lose -r- even after a consonant, although those tend to be older words since modern Macanese are usually fully capable of pronouncing /ɾ/ before or after a consonant. This phenomenon sometimes results in multiple forms of a word; for example, Portuguese obrigado ("thank you") manifests in Macanese both as obigado (with R-dropping) and brigado, with ⟨r⟩ retained but with the initial unstressed vowel dropped instead.

One phenomenon with older words is when /kɾi/ is reduced to /ki/, for example Portuguese criança ("child") becoming quiança. Though there are exceptions to this even in older words, for example cristám ("Catholic; Christian") rather than quistám. The Portuguese -dor agent suffix also tends to become -dô in Macanese, such as in the word compradô ("trusted servant who does the household shopping").

In some sources, ⟨r⟩ before a consonant or word-finally is retained in spelling, but not pronounced; some sources for example transcribe amôr as /aˈmo/, and pramor di as /pɾaˈmo di/ instead of /pɾaˈmoɾ di/.

R-dropping in Macanese parallels Hong Kong English, where ⟨r⟩ is generally also not pronounced after a vowel, and sometimes realized as /w/ word-initially and after a consonant.

=== Vowels ===
In terms of vowels, the first syllable in Macanese is usually pronounced openly even when unstressed. For example, comê (from Portuguese comer /kuˈmeɾ/) is pronounced /kɔˈme/ rather than /kuˈme/, as if it were spelt *cómê. This however does not apply to unstressed final vowels; unstressed ⟨o⟩ in the final syllable of a word is generally still pronounced as /u/. And as seen with the example of fucinho, if non-final /o/ shifts to /u/ in a Macanese word, it is almost always reflected in spelling. Similarly, if non-final /e/ shifts to /i/, it is often (but not always) reflected in spelling, e.g. Macanese filiz /fiˈlis/ from Portuguese feliz, or izizí from Portuguese exigir.

The pronunciation of nasal vowels may differ between different speakers, as there is no standardized pronunciation; for example, sâm ("to be", from Portuguese são ("they (pl.) are") may be pronounced either as /sɐŋ/ or /sɐ̃(ŋ)/, hence the alternative spelling sã. /-ŋ/ is more common.

⟨a⟩ and ⟨â⟩ are usually but not always pronounced as /a/, even in stressed positions; for example, reportâ ("to file a complaint") may be pronounced /ɾɛpɔ(ɾ)ˈtɐ/ or even /ɾɛpɔ(ɾ)ˈtʌ/ by some speakers rather than /ɾɛpɔ(ɾ)ˈta/. ⟨á⟩ however is generally pronounced as /a/, with the exception of the -(ç)ám suffix derived from Portuguese -(ç)ão.

In addition, initial unstressed vowels may be dropped entirely, for example Portuguese acabar and alugar becoming cavâ and lugâ respectively.

==== Diphthongs ====
Diphthongs from Portuguese are often not present or reduced in Macanese; for example, Portuguese cousa (archaic form of coisa ("thing")) becomes Macanese cuza ("what; why"), Portuguese dous ("two", modern term dois) becomes Macanese dôs, and Portuguese -eiro becomes -êro or -éro in Macanese. In some cases, this is due to Macanese inheriting a pre-Portuguese form; for example, nôm ("not") derived from Old Galician-Portuguese non (compare Galician non), becoming a doublet of nâm which comes from Portuguese não. Otherwise, the diphthong reduction may take place internally in Macanese, or in earlier Indo-Portuguese. Such de-diphthongization may sometimes render Macanese words closer to Spanish words, such as the aforementioned dôs and -êro (cf. Spanish dos, -ero), and also rópa ("clothes") from Portuguese roupa (cf. Spanish ropa).

In certain cases, even diphthongs from Cantonese may be reduced; Cantonese dau6 fu6 (豆腐) may be rendered as tafú rather than taufú; and faai3 teng5 (快艇) may become fatiám rather than faitiám. Nonetheless, both forms are in common use.

== Grammar ==
There has been little scientific research of Macanese grammar, much less on its development between the 16th and 20th centuries. Its grammatical structure seems to incorporate both European and Asian elements.

=== Articles ===
Like most Asian languages, Macanese lacks definite articles, but it has an indefinite article: unga. This indefinite article is also used to create qualifiers, such as qualunga ("which"), estunga ("this"), or cadunga ("each").

=== Pronouns ===
Macanese also lacks pronoun cases (io or iou means "I", "me" and "mine"), and forms possessive pronouns using the suffix -sa or -sua; for example, ilôtro-sa or ilôtro-sua means "theirs", while iou-sa or io-sua means "my". Certain possessive pronouns are however retained from Portuguese; minha is used as a synonym to iou-sa in emotional situations as well as in the header of letters, while nôsso and vôsso are also used in Macanese for the first-person plural possessive pronoun and the second-person singular possessive pronoun respectively, in addition to nôs-sa and vôs-sa. su, from Indo-Portuguese su and earlier Galician-Portuguese seu, is also used in Macanese as a third-person (and rarely, second-person) reflexive possessive pronoun, used standalone instead of as a particle attached to a pronoun. In both speech and literature, -sa is more common than -sua, and the Glossário do dialecto macaense (1988) has -sa as one of its entries, only mentioning -sua in its description.

In general, pronouns in Macanese are not gendered, that is, êle is used as the universal third-person singular pronoun. Macanese is also nominally pro-drop, even despite the lack of verb conjugations; the subject of a sentence must therefore be inferred through context. Both pronoun features (gender-neutral third-person singular pronoun, pro-drop) are likely influences from Cantonese, with the former being a calque of Cantonese keoi5 (佢).

=== Grammatical gender ===
While Macanese nominally uses a gender-neutral third-person pronoun, some speakers may use êla to indicate "she" or "her", as opposed to using êle for all genders. This is likely due to influence from modern Portuguese.

For certain adjectives in -o often describing female persons, a feminine form ending in -a is not uncommon, and may in some cases be more common than the masculine form, such as bunita ("pretty"), feminine form of bunito ("handsome, good-looking, nice"), from Portuguese bonito.

In very rare cases, adjectives may also have feminine forms depending on the former gender of the noun in Portuguese. For example, bô-quiança ("good child") rather than bôm-quiança, with bô possibly deriving from Portuguese boa, feminine form of bom (whence Macanese bôm); or maquiaçám ("spoiling (e.g. a child)") from Portuguese má criação, rather than mauquiaçám, despite the existence of mau in Macanese.

=== Verbs ===
Unlike Portuguese verbs, Macanese verbs are not inflected for grammatical person or TAM. For example, iou sâm means "I am", and êle sâm means "he/she is".

Progressive action (denoted in English by the "-ing" verbal forms) is denoted by a separate particle tâ, presumably derived from Portuguese está ("it is"). Completed actions are likewise indicated by the particle já, presumably from Portuguese já ("right now" or "already"), while nunca is used for things in the past which did not happen. lôgo (from Portuguese logo ("soon")) may be used for the positive future tense, while nádi is used for the negative future tense. In some cases, two time particles can be used in the same clause, for example in the sentence "Lôgo iou tâ vai chuchumecâ co vôs" ("I'll be gossiping with you"), but this is relatively rare. But in general, grammatical tense may not be indicated at all, and would require a listener or reader to infer from either context or time words such as onte ("yesterday") or amanhâm ("tomorrow").

Participles are generally formed by appending -do to the verb root, same as in Portuguese. However, participles in Macanese are relatively rare and often only serve as adjectives denoting the current state and change in state of something, for example estricâ rópa ("to iron clothes") → rópa estricado ("ironed clothes, clothes that have been ironed"), or durmí ("to sleep") → ficâ durmido ("to fall asleep", lit. "to become asleep"). Otherwise, some participles, especially irregular ones, may be inherited directly from Portuguese, for example fêto ("done") from Portuguese feito rather than forming *fazido from fazê ("to do").

=== Reduplication ===
Reduplication is used to make plural nouns (casa-casa = "houses"), plural adjectives (china-china = "several Chinese people or things"), and emphatic adverbs (cedo-cedo = "very early"), a pattern also found in Malay grammar. Otherwise, some nouns may be pluralized with no reduplication, especially when the amount of the noun is not important to the main idea of the sentence, and the pluralization is instead implied through context.

In older Macanese, it was more common for partial reduplication to take place, where only the first syllable of a multisyllabic word, or the first consonant (if any) + first vowel in a monosyllabic word, would be duplicated, for example fu-fula ("flowers") from fula ("flower"). This has nearly disappeared in modern Macanese in favour of full reduplication, that is a duplication of the entire word, i.e. fula-fula for "flowers". Among the most common Macanese words, only two still use partial reduplication: nhunhum ("men") from nhum ("man"), and nhonhônha ("women") from nhonha ("woman"). In other cases, partial reduplication has formed words with entirely different meanings to the original word, for example chuchupa ("paper cone used to hold roasted peanuts or chestnuts") from chupa, a (traditionally cylindrical) cubic measure descended from Malay cupak.

=== Prepositions ===
Similarly to Chavacano, na is used to indicate "in", "at", or "on"; but unlike Chavacano, pa (from Portuguese para) is used to indicate "to" or "towards".

di (literally "of", from Portuguese de) can also be used to connect nouns with adjectives, for example casa qui di largo meaning "large house", or combined with bêm ("well") to mean "very", for example bêm-di filiz meaning "very happy".

=== Comparatives and superlatives ===
Superlative and comparative forms are usually simply created by using más ("more; most") before the adjective or adverb, for example más bôm (lit. "more good") and más bêm (lit. "more well") meaning "better". Some irregular comparative forms may be inherited from Portuguese, such as pió ("worse") from Portuguese pior.

=== Apocope and apheresis ===
Common function words (time words, indefinite article, etc.) may sometimes have apocopic or aphetic forms. For example, abrí unga janela ("open a window") may become abrí'nga janela, tudo ora ("always", literally "all time") may become tud'ora, or já uví? ("did you hear?") may become j'uví?. This however depends on the speaker and is not standard or mandatory, unlike in French.

=== Cantonese influences ===
There are also some other less significant grammatical constructions derived from Cantonese, for example the usage of verb-not-verb for asking yes-no questions, e.g. (vôs) quêro-nôm-quêro meaning "do you want".

== Writing system ==
Patuá has no standardized orthography. A common orthography was first proposed by José dos Santos Ferreira, and the current most common orthography is largely based on Ferreira's 1996 Papiaçám di Macau, itself based mostly on the Portuguese orthography.

In the de facto standard orthography, the circumflex (â, ê, ô) or acute accent (á, é, í, ó, ú) are used to indicate syllable stress and open-vowel pronunciation, especially in the case of monosyllabic words. This contrasts with the Malay-based orthography of Kristang, which often uses -h after a vowel to indicate stress. The tilde is generally not used, except sometimes in the words sã, usually written as sâm or sam, or nã, written in modern Macanese as nâm or nam.

Maquista Chapado (2004) recommends using the circumflex for closed stressed a, e and o, the acute accent for (semi-)open stressed a, e and o, as well as stressed i, u in a word-final position, although this is not always followed in practice. For example, the word meaning "bread" (which descends from Portuguese pão) is recommended to be written as pám, however other sources (including but not limited to certain parts in Maquista Chapado itself) may instead use pâm.

The -ão suffix in Portuguese usually becomes -ám in Macanese if stressed, for example coraçám ("heart") from Portuguese coração; or -a if unstressed, for example bênça from Portuguese bênção, although -âm is generally more common in monosyllabic words descended from -ão, as outlined with pâm earlier. -ám is also used to spell -ang from Malay/Indonesian or Cantonese, for example saiám ("what a pity!; missing") from Malay sayang. -âm is sometimes also used in multisyllabic words if the Portuguese word ends in a non-diphthongal nasal vowel, for example amanhâm from Portuguese amanhã.

In general, it is recommended both by Ferreira and Maquista Chapado to use -m for the word-final nasal consonant /-ŋ/ in Portuguese inherits and certain Cantonese loanwords, while -n may be used to denote a nasal consonant when following a vowel and preceding a consonant, for example /aŋˈkuza/ → ancusa rather than amcusa or angcusa.

One exception is the indefinite article unga, pronounced /ˈuŋa/, same as the Galician unha. Some Macanese sources may spell it instead as ung'a, to prevent the word from being pronounced as /ˈuŋɡa/ (which some speakers do anyway). This also applies to its derived terms, such as estunga ("this") or cadunga ("each"). Multi-word Cantonese loanwords may also retain ng, but monosyllabic Cantonese words generally still use -m, for example sôm ("food; a dish") from Cantonese sung3 (餸), or tôm-tôm ("a piece of candy") from reduplication of Cantonese tong4-2 (糖).

When /e/ is reduced or otherwise morphed into /i/ or /ɪ/, it is often spelt phonetically with ⟨i⟩, for example fichâ and qui compared to Portuguese fechar and que. Likewise, when /o/ becomes /u/ in Macanese, or when Macanese inherits a dialectal Portuguese form which uses /u/ instead of /o/, it is also directly spelt as ⟨u⟩, such as durmí ("to sleep") from Portuguese dormir. Etymological ⟨s⟩ pronounced as /z/ may be written either as ⟨s⟩ or ⟨z⟩, for example cuza ("what, which") and ancusa ("thing") both derive from dated Portuguese cousa, but are spelt differently. /s/ between vowels is often written as "ss" like in Swiss German, for example in the word bassâ /baˈsa/ ("to lower").

Portuguese /ʒ/, pronounced variously as /z/ or /d͡ʒ/, may be written as either ⟨g⟩, ⟨j⟩ or ⟨z⟩, the former two deriving from Portuguese orthography, for example Portuguese fingir may become fingí or finzí. This sometimes leads to inconsistencies between the most common spelling and actual pronunciation, for example hoze ("today", from Portuguese hoje) may be pronounced /ˈɔd͡ʒi/ by some speakers.

Otherwise, the de facto standard orthography tends to follow Portuguese orthographic rules, for example silent ⟨h⟩ in Portuguese words, -n or -m after a vowel to indicate nasalization (although -n may simply be /n/, especially in Cantonese loanwords), ⟨i⟩ before/after a vowel to represent /j/, or using ⟨c⟩ for /k/ before ⟨a⟩, ⟨o⟩, and ⟨u⟩ (compare Macanese cacús with Indonesian kakus), and ⟨ç⟩ for non-word-initial /s/ before those vowels, even in foreign words. Words borrowed from Cantonese may use an orthography similar to the Hong Kong Government Cantonese Romanisation, for example leong-fan ("grass jelly") borrowed from Cantonese loeng4 fan2 (涼粉).

== Examples ==
Here is an example of a Patuá poem:

Patuá	Portuguese Translation	English Translation
Nhonha na jinela	A moça na janela	Young lady in the window
Co fula mogarim	Com uma flor de jasmim	With a jasmine flower
Sua mae tancarera	Sua mãe é uma pescadora Chinesa	Her mother is a Chinese fisherwoman
Seu pai canarim	Seu pai é um Indiano Português	Her father is a Portuguese Indian

Note that nhonha is cognate with nyonya in Malay/Kristang, both being derived from Portuguese dona 'lady'. In addition, due to the lack of a standardized orthography, various words may be spelled differently from person to person, such as co being written as cô or com, same as Portuguese.

Another example of a Patuá poem:

Patuá	Portuguese Translation	English Translation
Língu di gente antigo di Macau	A língua da gente antiga de Macau	The language of the old people of Macau
Lô disparecê tamên. Qui saiám!	Vai desaparecer também. Que pena!	Will disappear also. What a pity!
Nga dia, mas quanto áno,	Um dia daqui a alguns anos	One day, in a few years
Quiança lô priguntá co pai-mai	A criança perguntará aos pais	A child will ask his parents
Qui cuza sã afinal	O que é afinal	What is it, after all,
Dóci papiaçam di Macau?	A doce lingua de Macau?	The sweet language of Macau?

== Bibliography ==
- Batalha, Graciete Nogueira (1974). Língua de Macau: o que foi e o que é. Macau: Centro de Informação e Turism.
- Batalha, Graciete Nogueira (1977). Glossário do dialecto macaense: notas lingüísticas, etnográficas, e folclóricas. Coimbra: Instituto de Estudos Românicos. Revista Portuguesa de Filologia vol. XVII.
- Batalha, Graciete Nogueira (1985). "Situação e perspectivas do português e dos crioulos de origem portuguesa na Ásia Oriental (Macau, Hong Kong, Singapura, Indonesia)". Congresso sobre a situação actual da língua portuguesa no mundo. Lisboa: Instituto de Cultura e Língua Portuguesa, No. 646 vol. 1, 287–303.
- Batalha, Graciete Nogueira (1988). Suplemento ao glossário do dialecto macaense : novas notas linguísticas, etnográficas e folclóricas. Macau: Instituto Cultural de Macau.
- Bruning, Harald (2007). "Patua – A procura do reconhecimento internacional." 'Revista Macau,' 16–25. IV Serie – No. 6. Gabinete de Comunicacao Social da Regiao Administrativa Especial de Macau/Delta Edicoes, Lda. Macau: Revista Macau
- Senna Fernandes, Miguel de and Alan Baxter (2004). Maquista Chapado: Vocabulary and Expressions in Macau's Portuguese Creole. Macau: Macau International Institute.
- Santos Ferreira, José dos (1978). Papiá Cristâm di Macau: Epitome de gramática comparada e vocabulário: dialecto macaense. Macau: [s.n.].
- Tomás, Isabel (1988). "O crioulo macaense. Algumas questões". Revista de Cultura 2/2: 36–48.
- Tomás, Isabel (1990). "Da vida e morte de um crioulo". Revista de Cultura 4/9: 68–79.
