= Sprachraum =

Geographical region where a common first language is spoken

In linguistics, a sprachraum (/ˈsprɑːkraʊm/; German: [ˈʃpʁaːxˌʁaʊm], "language area", plural sprachräume, German: [ˈʃpʁaχˌʁɔʏmə]) is a geographical region where a common first language (mother tongue), with dialect varieties, or group of languages is spoken.

== Characteristics ==
Many sprachräume are separated by national borders, whilst others are separated by oceans or ethnolinguistic boundaries.

The five major Western sprachräume (by number of speakers) are those of English, Spanish, French, Portuguese, and German.

The English Sprachraum (Anglosphere) spans the globe from the United Kingdom, Ireland, United States, Canada, Australia, and New Zealand to the many former British and American colonies in which English has official language status alongside local languages, such as India, South Africa, and the Philippines.

The Spanish Sprachraum, known as the Hispanosphere, originated in the Iberian Peninsula but today most Spanish speakers are in Hispanic America. Of all countries with a majority of Spanish speakers, only Spain and Equatorial Guinea are outside the Americas. The United States, especially the Southwestern region, is also considered to be part of the Hispanosphere. As of 2016, the majority of the country's over 40 million native Spanish speakers reside in the region, and nearly 60 million Americans (~20% of the population) profess fluency in the language.

The French Sprachraum, which also spans the globe, is known as la francophonie. It includes French-speaking Europe (France, southern Belgium, western Switzerland, Monaco, and Luxembourg), along with Francophone Africa, Quebec in Canada, parts of the United States (Louisiana and northern New England), French Caribbean, and some other former French colonies such as the former Indochina and Vanuatu. La Francophonie is also the short name of an international organisation of countries with French as either an official or cultural language.

The German Sprachraum (German: Deutscher Sprachraum) is mostly concentrated in Central Europe, specifically Germany, central and eastern Switzerland, Austria, Liechtenstein, Luxembourg, South Tyrol, and the German-speaking Community of Belgium. A significant concentration of native German-speakers is also found in Namibia, which was part of the German colonial empire and in which German continues to be a national language.

The Portuguese Sprachraum is referred to as the Lusophony (Portuguese: Lusofonia). It is a cultural entity that includes the countries in which Portuguese is the official language and are culturally and linguistically linked to Portugal. The Lusophony spans Portugal, Brazil, Lusophone Africa, East Timor, and Macau. The Community of Portuguese Language Countries (Portuguese: Comunidade dos Países de Língua Portuguesa, abbreviated to CPLP) is the intergovernmental organisation of nations in which Portuguese is an official language.

By extension, a sprachraum can also include a group of related languages. Thus, the Scandinavian Sprachraum includes Norway, Sweden, Denmark, Iceland, and the Faroe Islands, and the Finnic Sprachraum is Finland, Estonia, and adjacent areas of Scandinavia and Russia.

Even within a single sprachraum, there may be different but closely related languages, which is otherwise known as a dialect continuum. A classic example is the varieties of Chinese, which can be mutually unintelligible in spoken form but are typically considered the same language (or at least closely related) and have a unified non-phonetic writing system. Arabic has a similar situation, but its writing system (an abjad) reflects the pronunciation and grammar of a common literary language (Modern Standard Arabic).

== Examples ==
=== Germanic languages ===
- Anglosphere (the English-speaking world)
- Dutch Language Union
- List of territorial entities where German is an official language
- Germanic Europe cluster (Continental West Germanic and North Germanic)

=== Romance languages ===
- Catalan Countries (the Catalan-speaking part of Europe)
- List of territorial entities where French is an official language
- List of countries and territories where Romanian is an official language
- Hispanophone world (where Spanish is spoken)
- Latin Europe
- Lusofonia (the Lusophone world)

=== Other Indo-European languages ===
- Hindi Belt
- Bengal
- Slavisphere
- Greater Iran (Persian and closely related languages)

=== Other languages ===
- Arab world
- Austronesia
  - Malay world
- Sinophone (where various forms of Chinese is spoken)

== See also ==
- Dachsprache
- Dialect continuum
- Lingua franca
- Pluricentric language
- Sprachbund
- World language
