= Portuguese language in Africa =

Language official or recognized in several countries

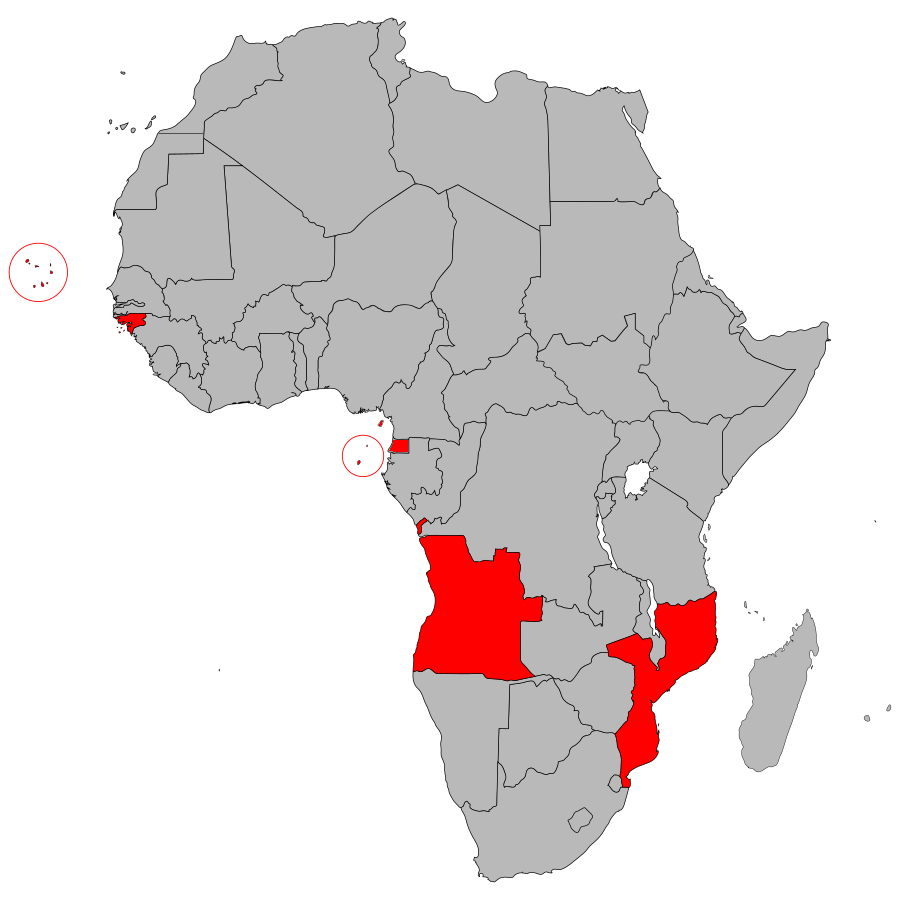
The PALOP (Países Africanos de Língua Oficial Portuguesa), highlighted in red

Portuguese is spoken in a number of African countries and is the official language in five African countries: Cape Verde, Guinea-Bissau, São Tomé and Príncipe, Angola and Mozambique. It also has official status in Equatorial Guinea, where it is a minority language spoken in the province of Annobón. There are Portuguese-speaking communities in most countries of Southern Africa, a mixture of Portuguese settlers and Angolans and Mozambicans who left their countries during the civil wars. A conservative estimate is that there are about 19 million people who use Portuguese as their sole mother tongue across Africa and approximately 35.5 million total speakers, but depending on the criteria applied, the number might be considerably higher. Drawing upon census data provided by the PALOP (Portuguese-speaking African nations), especially the 2014 Angolan census and the 2017 Mozambican census, one may arrive at a rough projection of 33.5 million native speakers (27.5 million Angolans - 71% of the population; 5.88 million Mozambicans - 16.5% of the population; 143.000 Santomenses; 5.850 Guineans and 11.800 Cape Verdeans) and total (L1+L2) 49 million speakers (27.5 million Angolans, 20.48 million Mozambicans and 1.3 million in other CPLP and neighbouring African countries). Indeed many Africans speak Portuguese as a second language, in countries like Angola and Mozambique, where Portuguese is an official language, but also in countries like South Africa and Senegal, thanks to migrants coming from Portuguese-speaking countries.

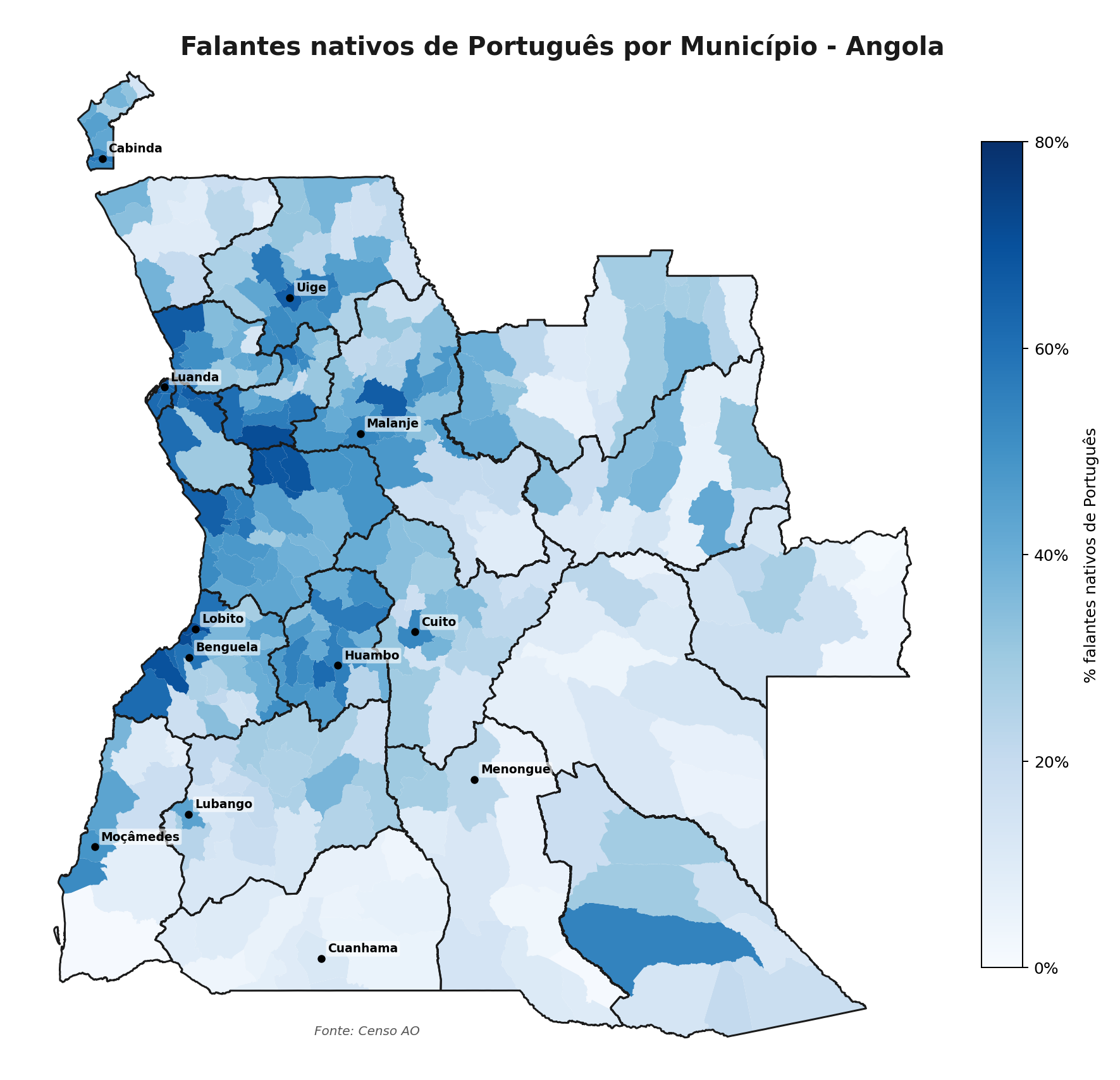
Portuguese as a Native Language in Angola - geographical distribution

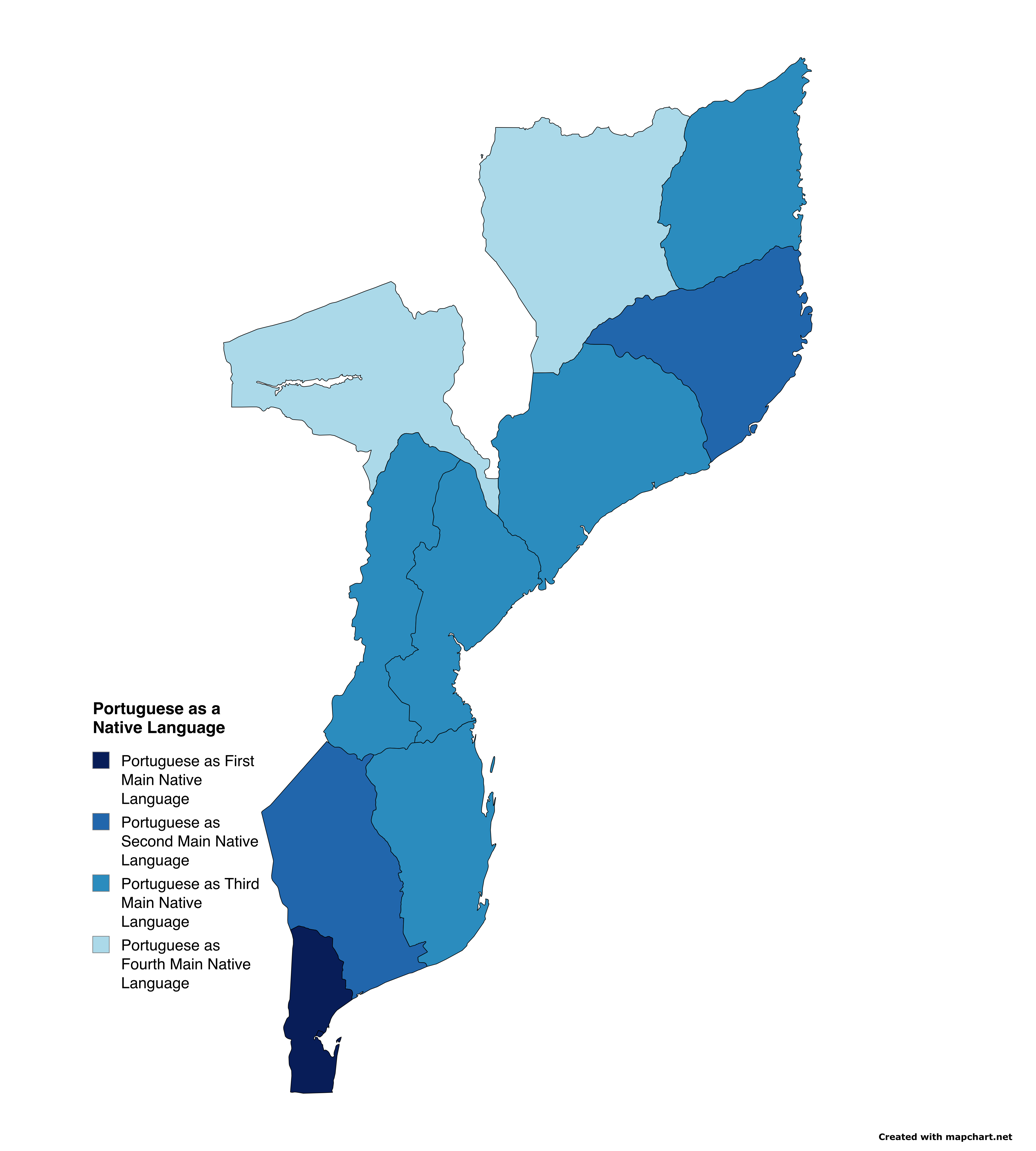
Portuguese as a native language in Mozambique – geographical distribution

Africa is, therefore, the continent with the second-most Portuguese speakers in the world, only behind the Americas. Like French and English, Portuguese has become a post-colonial language in Africa and one of the working languages of the African Union (AU) and the Southern African Development Community (SADC). Portuguese co-exists in Guinea-Bissau, Cape Verde, and São Tomé and Principe with Portuguese-based creoles (Upper Guinea and Gulf of Guinea Creoles), but Portuguese continues to be the official language of these countries.

Portuguese has become the national language of Angola, as it is so widely spoken in every segment of society, and serves as the home language of the majority of the Angolan population, particularly in the big towns and cities. A few native African languages continue to be spoken, but are losing ground to Portuguese. In Mozambique, in addition to Portuguese as the official language, it is fast becoming the lingua franca. And as in Angola, Portuguese is the dominant spoken language in the urban areas of the country. In the five former African Portuguese colonies, Portuguese is the language of: commerce, the government, courts, schools and mass media.

In Africa, the Portuguese language experiences pressure and possibly competition from French and English. Cape Verde, Guinea-Bissau and São Tomé and Príncipe are all members of La Francophonie and Mozambique is a member of the Commonwealth of Nations and has observer status at La Francophonie. Conversely, Equatorial Guinea has announced its decision to introduce Portuguese as its third official language, in addition to Spanish and French, and has been accepted as a member of CPLP. Mauritius and Senegal have also joined the CPLP as associate observer members.

== Geographic distribution ==
The nation-states with Portuguese as an official language in Africa are referred to by the acronym PALOP (Países Africanos de Língua Oficial Portuguesa) and include the following: Angola, Cape Verde, Guinea-Bissau, Mozambique, São Tomé and Príncipe and Equatorial Guinea. Portuguese is a primarily urban language having a reduced presence in rural areas, except for in Angola and São Tomé and Príncipe, where the language is more widespread on a national level.

South Africa also has approximately 300,000 speakers of Portuguese, primarily settlers from Madeira and white Angolans and Mozambicans who emigrated from 1975 onwards, following the independence of the former colonies. The civil wars in Angola and Mozambique also resulted in more recent migrations of refugees (some of whom speak Portuguese) to neighbouring countries such as Democratic Republic of Congo, Namibia, Zambia and South Africa. Other migrations involved returning Afro-Brazilian ex-slaves to places such as Nigeria, Benin, Togo, Angola and Mozambique. There are also some returning white Portuguese African refugees and their descendants from Brazil, Portugal, and South Africa to their former African controlled territories, mostly to Angola (up to 500,000) and Mozambique (350,000), and most importantly, there is the arrival of Portuguese post-colonial expatriates in Angola in the recent years, because of Portugal's economic interests and the Angolan economic boom.

Senegal has its own Lusophone connection with a significant community of Cape Verdeans in Dakar and speakers of Guinea-Bissau Creole in its southern region of Casamance, which was once part of the Portuguese colonial empire. Portuguese is taught as a foreign language throughout the country. In 2008, Senegal became an observer nation in the CPLP.

Equatorial Guinea, at one point a Portuguese colony, is home to a Portuguese-based Creole and is a member nation in the CPLP. Portuguese is now an official language in Equatorial Guinea, although it is practically not used.

Mauritius, a multilingual island in the Indian Ocean, has strong cultural ties with Mozambique. The Portuguese were the first Europeans to encounter the island. In 2006, Mauritius joined the CPLP as an associate member.

As a fellow member of the SADC, Zambia has introduced Portuguese language instruction in its primary school system, partially due to the presence of a large Angolan population there.

== The role of Portuguese in Africa ==
As an official language, Portuguese serves in the realms of administration, education, law, politics and media. Given the existing linguistic diversity of the PALOPs, Portuguese also serves the purpose of lingua franca allowing communication between fellow citizens of different ethno-linguistic backgrounds. The standard Portuguese used in education, media and legal documents is based on European Portuguese vocabulary used in Lisbon, but African Portuguese dialects differ from standard European Portuguese both in terms of pronunciation and colloquial vocabulary.

Additionally, Portuguese connects the PALOP countries to one another, to Portugal and to East Timor, Macau and Brazil, which were also once Portuguese colonies.

Music is one way in which the linguistic profiles of PALOP have increased. Many recording artists from PALOP, in addition to singing in their maternal languages, sing in Portuguese to one degree or another. The success of these artists in the world music industry increases international awareness of Portuguese as an African language.

As a literary language, Portuguese has a strong role in the PALOP. Authors such as Francisco José Tenreiro, Luandino Vieira, Mia Couto, Pepetela, Lopito Feijóo, Rui Knopfli, Luis Kandjimbo, Manuel Rui or Ondjaki have made valuable contributions to lusophone literature, prompting an African scent and ideas to the language and creating a place for the Portuguese language in the African imaginary.

Sub-Saharan Africa is the region where the Portuguese language is most likely to expand, because of the expansion of education and rapid population growth. It is also where the language has evolved the most in recent years. It is estimated that by 2100, Africa will have the majority of Portuguese speakers in the world, surpassing Brazil. The Portuguese-speaking African nations together with Brazil, have turned Portuguese into a formidable world language, also making it an important language of the global economy.

== Media ==
Portuguese is the language of journalism, which serves as a vehicle for the dissemination of the language. Literacy being an issue, radio serves as an important source of information for Lusophone Africans.

Voice of America, BBC Para África, RFI and RTP África have regular services in Portuguese for listeners in Africa.

== Creoles ==
Any discussion of the role of the Portuguese language in Africa must take into account the various Portuguese creoles that have developed there. These creole languages co-exist with Portuguese and, in the countries where they are spoken, form a continuum with the lexifying language.

In Cape Verde, crioulo levinho refers to a variety of Cape Verdean Creole which takes on various features of Portuguese and is a result of processes of decreolization in the archipelago. In São Tomé e Principe, Santomense Portuguese is a variety of Portuguese strongly influenced by Forro in syntax and vocabulary. Since the lexicons of those languages are derived from Portuguese, even creole-speakers who do not speak Portuguese have a passive knowledge of it.

In addition, Portuguese creoles have often been (and often continue to be) written using Portuguese orthography. An important issue in discussions of standardization of creoles is whether it is better to devise a truly phonetic orthography or to choose an etymological one based on Portuguese.

== See also ==
- Portuguese language
- Angolan Portuguese
- Cape Verdean Portuguese
- Guinean Portuguese
- Mozambican Portuguese
- São Toméan Portuguese
- PALOP
- CPLP
- Portuguese Empire
- Languages of Africa
