= List of official languages of international organizations =

This is a list of official languages of international organizations. Different organizations sometimes refer to their principal languages of administration and communication as "working languages", while others refer to these as being "official". No distinction is made here, except where an organization itself, distinguishes between its official and working languages.

English and French are often regarded as the symbolic official languages, although the former has gained prominence in recent years.

== International ==
According to a recent study of multilingualism in 13 major international organizations (Commonwealth, ICC, ILO, IMF, IOC, IPU, ITU, OECD, UN, UPU, WB, WHO, and WTO), English is an official language in almost all (12). This is followed by French (10); Spanish (6); and Arabic, Chinese, and Russian (3 each). Interpretation is offered in Japanese and German as well for 2 organizations.

The six official languages of the United Nations reflects the languages of the permanent members of the Security Council (Chinese, English, French, and Russian), in addition to Arabic and Spanish. Another study found that the percentage of each language used at each United Nations meeting in 2010 was distributed as follows: English (98%), French (87%), Spanish (34%), Russian (10%), Arabic (7%), and Chinese (3%).

The following is a list of major international and inter-governmental organizations.

Institutions	Languages
Amnesty International	Portuguese, Arabic, English, French and Spanish
Antarctic Treaty Secretariat (ATS)	English, French, Spanish and Russian
Bank for International Settlements (BIS)	English, French, German and Spanish
Commonwealth of Nations	English
Community of Portuguese Language Countries (CPLP)	Portuguese
FIFA	Arabic, English, French, German, Portuguese, Russian and Spanish
Holy See	Latin (official), Italian (administrative and diplomatic) and French (diplomatic)
International Civil Aviation Organization (ICAO)	Arabic, Chinese, English, French, Russian and Spanish
International Criminal Court (ICC)	Arabic, Chinese, English, French, Russian and Spanish (English and French are working languages)
International Criminal Police Organization (Interpol)	Arabic, English, French and Spanish
International Energy Agency (IEA)	English
International Federation of Journalists (IFJ)	English, French and Spanish
International Labour Organization (ILO/OIT)	English, French and Spanish
International Monetary Fund (IMF)	English (interpretation into Arabic, Chinese, French, German, Portuguese, Russian and Spanish)
International Olympic Committee (IOC/CIO)	French and English (with simultaneous interpretation provided for Arabic, German, Russian, and Spanish)
International Organization for Standardization (ISO)	English, French and Russian
International Telecommunication Union (ITU)	English, French and Spanish
International Union for Conservation of Nature (IUCN)	English, French and Spanish
Inter-Parliamentary Union (IPU)	French and English (with conferences also having simultaneous interpretation into Arabic and Spanish)
Latin Union (activities have been suspended since 2012)	Catalan, French, Spanish, Portuguese, Italian and Romanian
Médecins Sans Frontières	Arabic, English, French, Portuguese and Spanish
Organisation for Economic Co-operation and Development (OECD/OCDE)	English and French
Organisation internationale de la Francophonie (OIF)	French
Organization of Ibero-American States (OEI)	Spanish and Portuguese
Organisation of Islamic Cooperation (OIC/OCI)	Arabic, English and French
Red Cross	Arabic, English, French, Spanish, Russian, Portuguese and German
Rotary International	English, French, German, Italian, Japanese, Korean, Portuguese, and Spanish
Trans-Pacific Partnership (TPP)	English, French, and Spanish
United Nations Educational, Scientific and Cultural Organization (UNESCO)	Arabic, Chinese, English, French, Hindi, Indonesian, Italian, Portuguese, Russian and Spanish
United Nations (UN/ONU)	Under the Charter, the official languages are Chinese, English, French, Russian, Spanish as well as Arabic which was added in 1973. See also: Official languages of the United Nations.
Universal Postal Union (UPU)	French (official) and English (working). Other languages translated: Arabic, Chinese, German, Portuguese, Russian and Spanish
World Bank (WB)	English (with conferences also having simultaneous interpretation into Arabic, Chinese, French, Russian and Spanish)
World Customs Organization	English, French, and Spanish (with translation offered into Arabic and Russian)
World Health Organization (WHO)	Arabic, Chinese, English, French, Russian, and Spanish.
World Intellectual Property Organization (WIPO)	Arabic, Chinese, English, French, German, Japanese, Portuguese, Russian, Spanish and Korean
World Trade Organization (WTO/OMC)	English, French and Spanish
African Development Bank	English, French
African Union (AU/UA)	Arabic, French, English, Portuguese, Spanish and Swahili
Greater Arab Free Trade Area (GAFTA)	Arabic
Arab League	Arabic
Asia-Pacific Economic Cooperation (APEC)	English
Asian Development Bank (ADB)	English
Asian Infrastructure Investment Bank (AIIB)	English
Association of Southeast Asian Nations (ASEAN)	English (working language), Burmese, Filipino, Indonesian, Khmer, Lao, Malay, Mandarin, Tamil, Thai and Vietnamese
Benelux	Dutch and French
Caribbean Community (CARICOM)	English, French, Dutch and Spanish
Caribbean Development Bank (CDB)	English
Central American Common Market (CACM)	Spanish
Common Market for Eastern and Southern Africa (COMESA)	English, French and Portuguese
Commonwealth of Independent States (CIS)	Russian
Cooperation Council for the Arab States of the Gulf (GCC)	Arabic
Council of Europe	English and French
East African Community (EAC)	English, French and Swahili
Economic Community of West African States (ECOWAS/CEDEAO)	English, French and Portuguese
Economic and Monetary Community of Central Africa (CEMAC)	French, Portuguese and Spanish
Eurasian Development Bank (EDB)	Russian
Eurasian Economic Union (EAEU)	Russian
European Space Agency (ESA)	English, French and German
European Union (EU/UE)	24 official languages with three of these — English, French and German — being working languages of some internal EU bodies such as the European Commission
Group of Seven (G7), formerly the Group of Eight (G8)	English, French, German, Italian and Japanese
Gulf Cooperation Council (GCC)	Arabic
Indian Ocean Rim Association (IORA)	English
Islamic Development Bank (IDB)	Arabic, with French and English as working languages
Mercosur/Mercosul	Guarani, Portuguese and Spanish.
New Development Bank (NDB)	English
Nordic Investment Bank (NDB)	English
Nordic Council (NC)	Danish, Finnish, Norwegian and Swedish (working languages)
North Atlantic Treaty Organization (NATO/OTAN)	English and French.
Organization for Security and Co-operation in Europe (OSCE)	English, French, German, Italian, Russian and Spanish
Organization of the Petroleum Exporting Countries (OPEC)	English
Organization of American States (OAS/OEA)	Spanish, English, Portuguese and French. See also: Official languages of the Organization of American States
Pacific Islands Forum	English
Shanghai Cooperation Organisation (SCO)	Chinese and Russian.
South Asian Association for Regional Cooperation (SAARC)	English
South Pacific Commission (SPC)	English and French
Southern African Development Community (SADC)	English, French and Portuguese (working languages)
Union of South American Nations (Unasul-Unasur)	Dutch, English, Portuguese and Spanish
United States–Mexico–Canada Agreement (USMCA; superseded NAFTA)	English, Spanish and French.

== Defunct ==
Institutions	Languages
Council for Mutual Economic Assistance (Comecon)	Russian
League of Nations	English and French
Warsaw Treaty Organization (WTO)	Czech, German, Polish and Russian

== See also ==
- List of official languages by country and territory
- Working language
- List of international organisations which have French as an official language
- List of international organisations which have Portuguese as an official language
