= Portuguese-language countries =

Portuguese-language countries may refer to:

- Community of Portuguese Language Countries
- Countries where Portuguese is an official language
