= List of international organisations which have Portuguese as an official language =

This is a list of international organisations which have Portuguese as an official, administrative or working language.

Organisation	Number of official languages	Portuguese name	Headquarters	Note
CPLP		Comunidade dos Países de Língua Portuguesa	Lisbon, Portugal	The community of Portuguese language countries
PALOP	1	Países Africanos de Língua Oficial Portuguesa	N/A	The community of Portuguese-speaking African nations
ACTO	4 (Dutch, English, Spanish)	Organização do Tratado de Cooperação Amazônica	Brasília, Brazil	
ALADI	2 (Spanish)	Associação Latino-Americana de Integração	Montevideo, Uruguay	
AU	5 (Languages of the AU)	União Africana	Addis Ababa, Ethiopia	Portuguese is an official language in 6 member states.
CELAC	5 (Dutch, English, French, Spanish)	Comunidade de Estados Latino-Americanos e Caribenhos	N/A	
CEN-SAD	4 (Arabic, English, French)	Comunidade dos Estados de Sahel-Saharan	Tripoli, Libya	
COMESA	3 (English, French)	Mercado Comum da África Oriental e Austral	Tripoli, Libya	
CONMEBOL	2 (Spanish)	Confederação Sul-Americana de Futebol	Luque, Paraguay	
CONSANAT	2 (Spanish)	Confederação Sul-Americana de Natação	Rio de Janeiro, Brazil	
CONSUDATLE	2 (Spanish)	Confederação Sul-Americana de Atletismo	Manaus, Brazil	
CONSUR	2 (Spanish)	Confederação Sul-Americana de Râguebi	Montevideo, Uruguay	
CSV	2 (Spanish)	Confederação Sul-Americana de Voleibol	Rio de Janeiro, Brazil	
ECCAS	2 (French)	Comunidade Económica dos Estados da África Central	Libreville, Gabon	
ECOWAS	3 (English, French)	Comunidade Económica dos Estados da África Ocidental	Abuja, Nigeria	
EU	24 (Languages of the EU)	União Europeia	Brussels, Belgium	The European Commission, conducts its internal business in three languages, English, French and German
FIFA	7 (Arabic, English, German, French, Russian, Spanish)	Federação Internacional de Futebol Associado	Zürich, Switzerland	Arabic, Portuguese and Russian are additional languages for the Congress.
IADB	4 (English, French, Spanish)	Banco Interamericano de Desenvolvimento	Washington, D.C., United States	
Latin Union	6 (Catalan, French, Italian, Romanian, Spanish)	União Latina	Paris, France	
Mercosur	3 (Spanish, Guarani)	Mercado Comum do Sul	Montevideo, Uruguay	Portuguese and Spanish are the main work languages
OAS	4 (English, French, Spanish)	Organização dos Estados Americanos	Washington, D.C., United States	
OIAS	2 (Spanish)	Organização dos Estados Ibero-americanos	Madrid, Spain	
PATHF	3 (English, Portuguese)	Federação Pan-Americana de Andebol	Guaynabo, Puerto Rico	
Rio Group	2 (Spanish)	Grupo do Rio	N/A	
SADC	3 (English, French)	Comunidade para o Desenvolvimento da África Austral	Gaborone, Botswana	
UNASUR	4 (Dutch, English, Spanish)	União de Nações Sul-Americanas	Cochabamba, Bolivia and Quito, Ecuador	
ZPCAS	4 (English, French, Spanish)	Zona de Paz e Cooperação do Atlântico Sul	Brasília, Brazil	
Médecins Sans Frontières	5 (English, French, Spanish, Arabic)	Médicos sem Fronteiras	Geneva, Switzerland	
Red Cross	7 (English, German, Spanish, Arabic, French, Russian)	Cruz Vermelha	Geneva, Switzerland	
Amnesty International	5 (English, French, Spanish, Arabic)	Anistia Internacional	London, United Kingdom	
Inter-American Court of Human Rights	4 (Spanish, French, English)	Corte Interamericana de Direitos Humanos	San José, Costa Rica	
Latin American Parliament	2 (Spanish)	Parlamento Latino-americano	Panama City, Panama	
African Court on Human and Peoples' Rights	6 (Arabic, English, French, Spanish, Kiswahili)	Tribunal Africano dos Direitos Humanos e dos Povos	Ouagadougou, Burkina Faso	
European Space Agency	4 (French, German, English)	Agência Espacial Europeia	Paris, France	
Macau Forum	2 (Chinese)	Fórum de Macau	Macau, China	
World Intellectual Property Organization	10 (Arabic, Chinese, English, French, Russian, Spanish, German, Japanese and Korean)	Organização Mundial da Propriedade Intelectual	Geneva, Switzerland	
UNESCO	10 (Arabic, Chinese, English, French, Hindi, Indonesian, Italian, Russian and Spanish)	Organização das Nações Unidas para a Educação, a Ciência e a Cultura	Paris, France	

== See also ==
- List of countries where Portuguese is an official language
- List of international organisations which have French as an official language
