= United Nations System =

Organisations comprising the UN

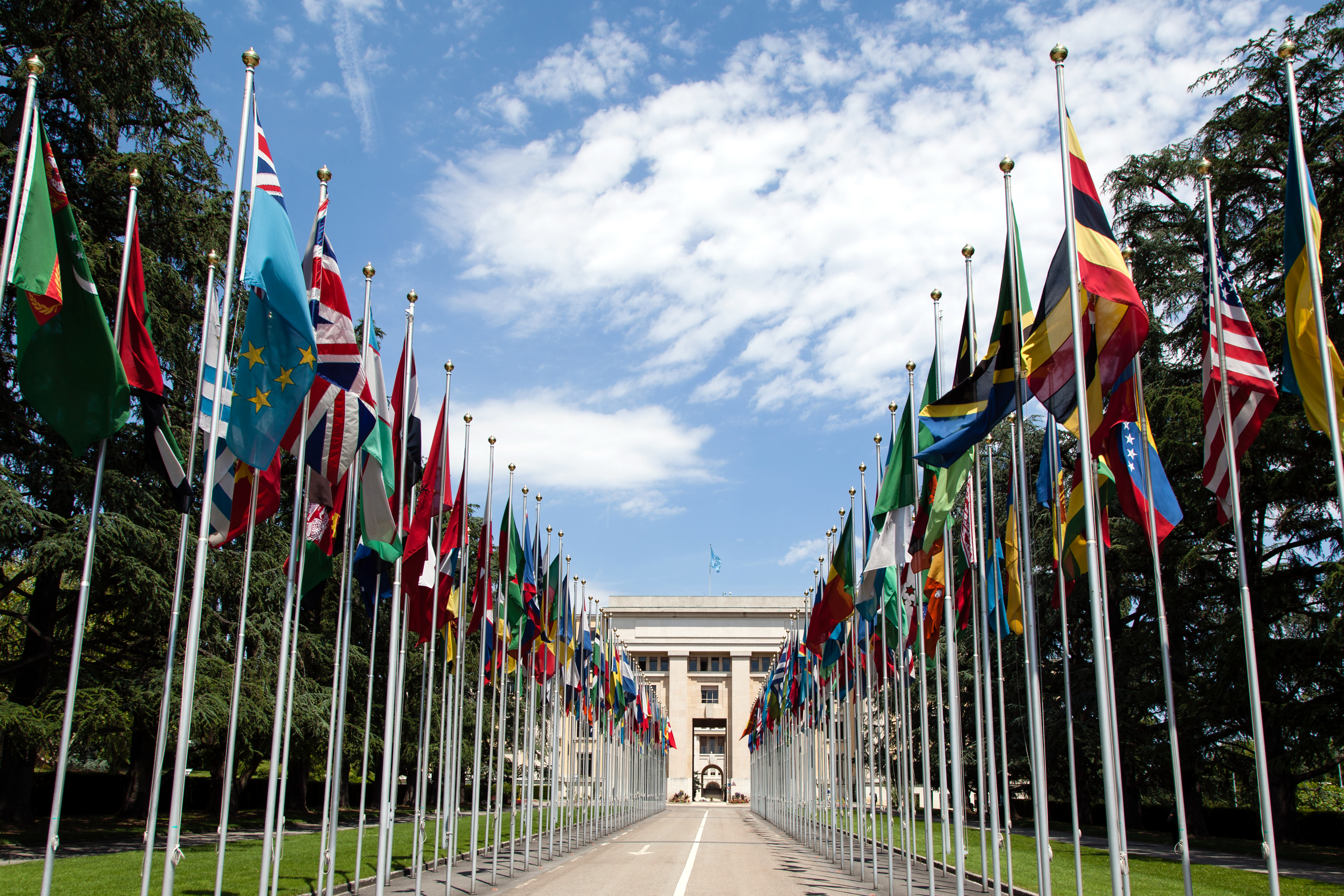
The United Nations Office at Geneva (Switzerland) is the second biggest UN centre, after the United Nations Headquarters (New York City).

The United Nations System consists of the United Nations' six principal bodies (the General Assembly, the Security Council, the Economic and Social Council (ECOSOC), the Trusteeship Council, the International Court of Justice (ICJ), and the Secretariat), and the specialized agencies and related organizations. The UN System includes subsidiary bodies such as the separately administered funds and programmes, research and training institutes, and other subsidiary entities. Some organizations predate the founding of the United Nations in 1945 and were inherited after the dissolution of the League of Nations.

The executive heads of some of the United Nations System organizations, and the World Trade Organization, which is not formally part of the United Nations System, have seats on the United Nations System Chief Executives' Board for Coordination (CEB). This body, chaired by the secretary-general of the United Nations, meets twice a year to coordinate the work of the organizations of the United Nations System.

== Principal organs ==
The United Nations itself has six principal organs established by the Charter of the United Nations:

Principal organs of the United Nations

UN General Assembly
— Deliberative assembly of all UN member states —

UN Secretariat
— Administrative organ of the UN —

International Court of Justice
— Universal court for international law —
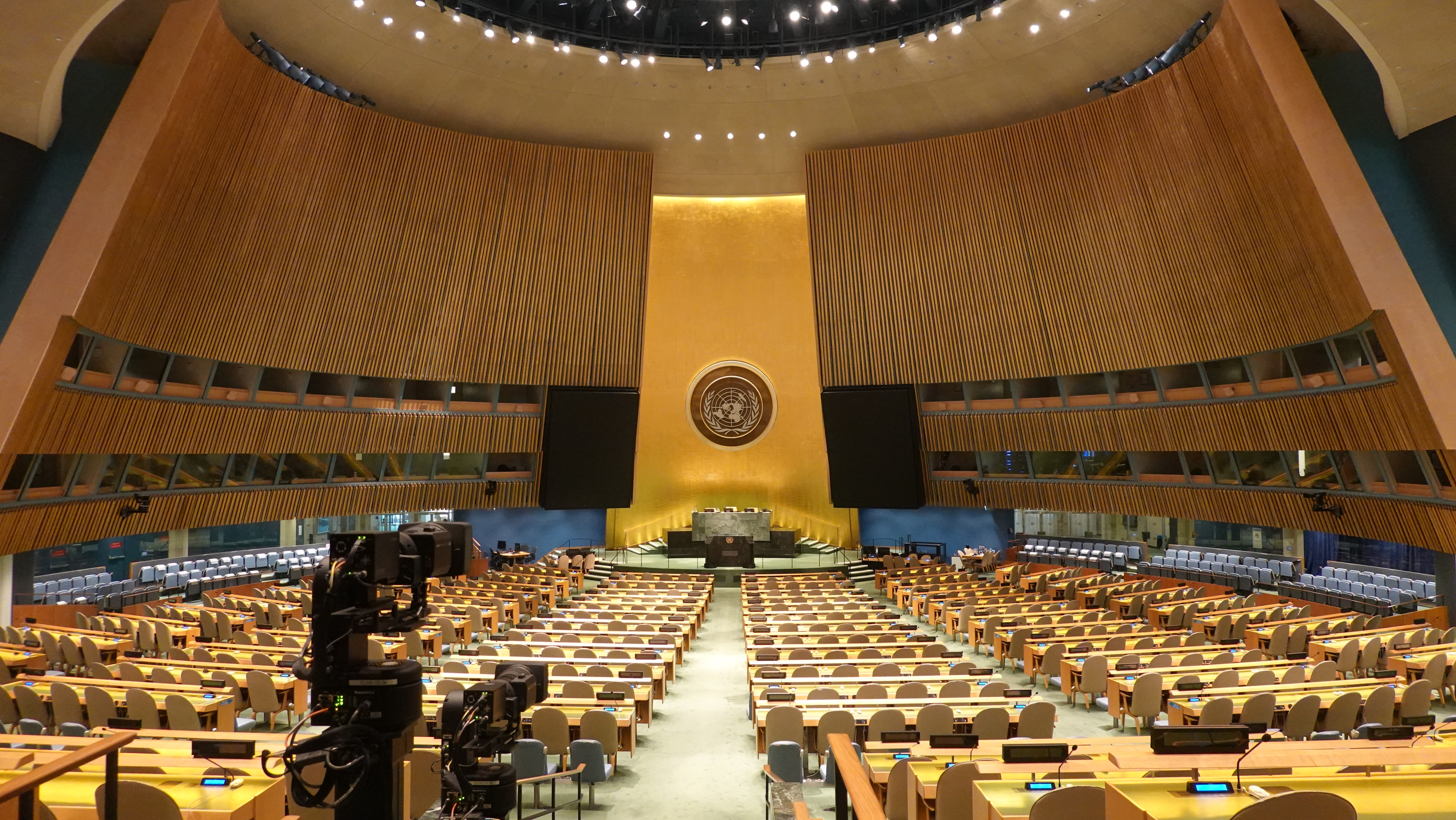
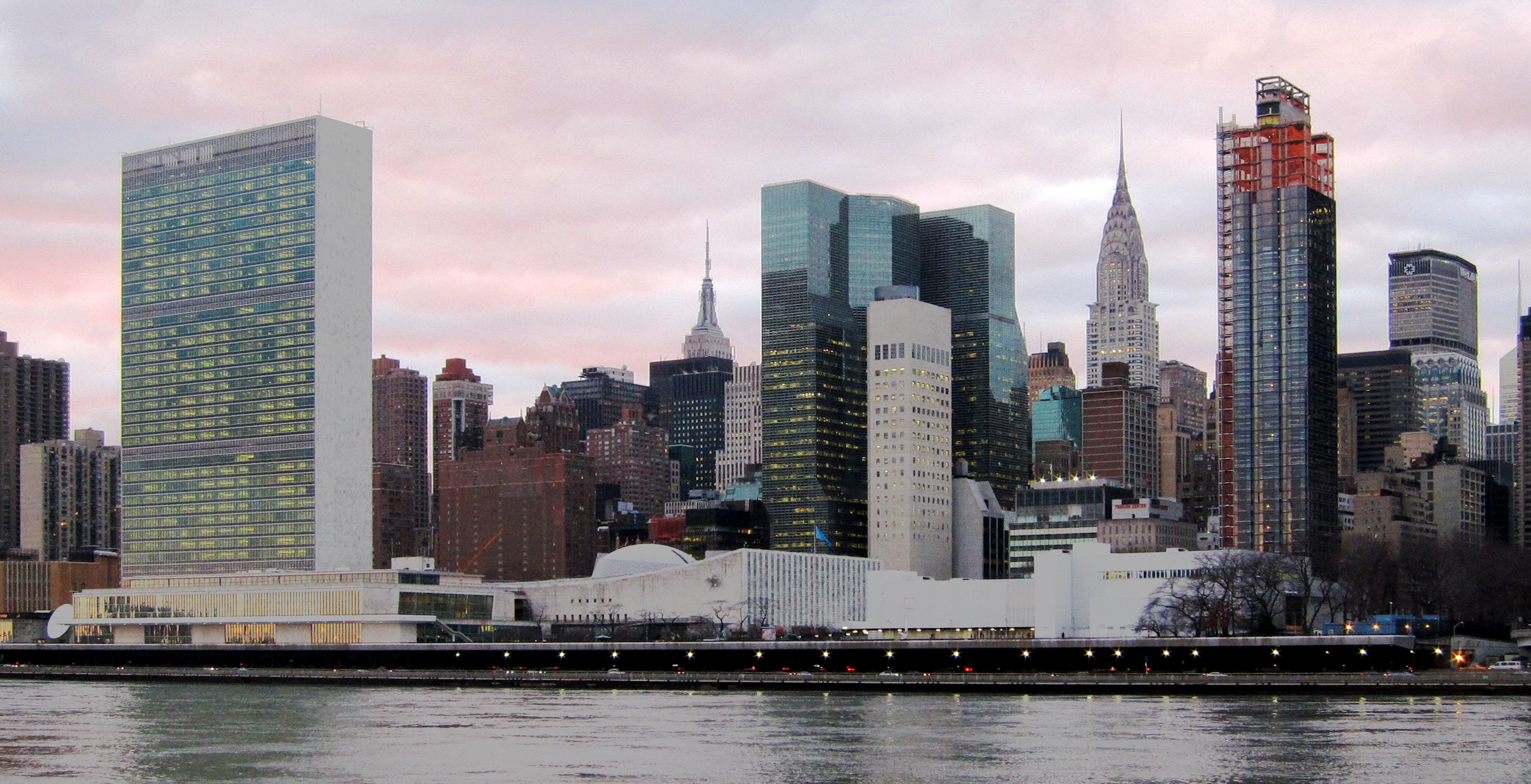
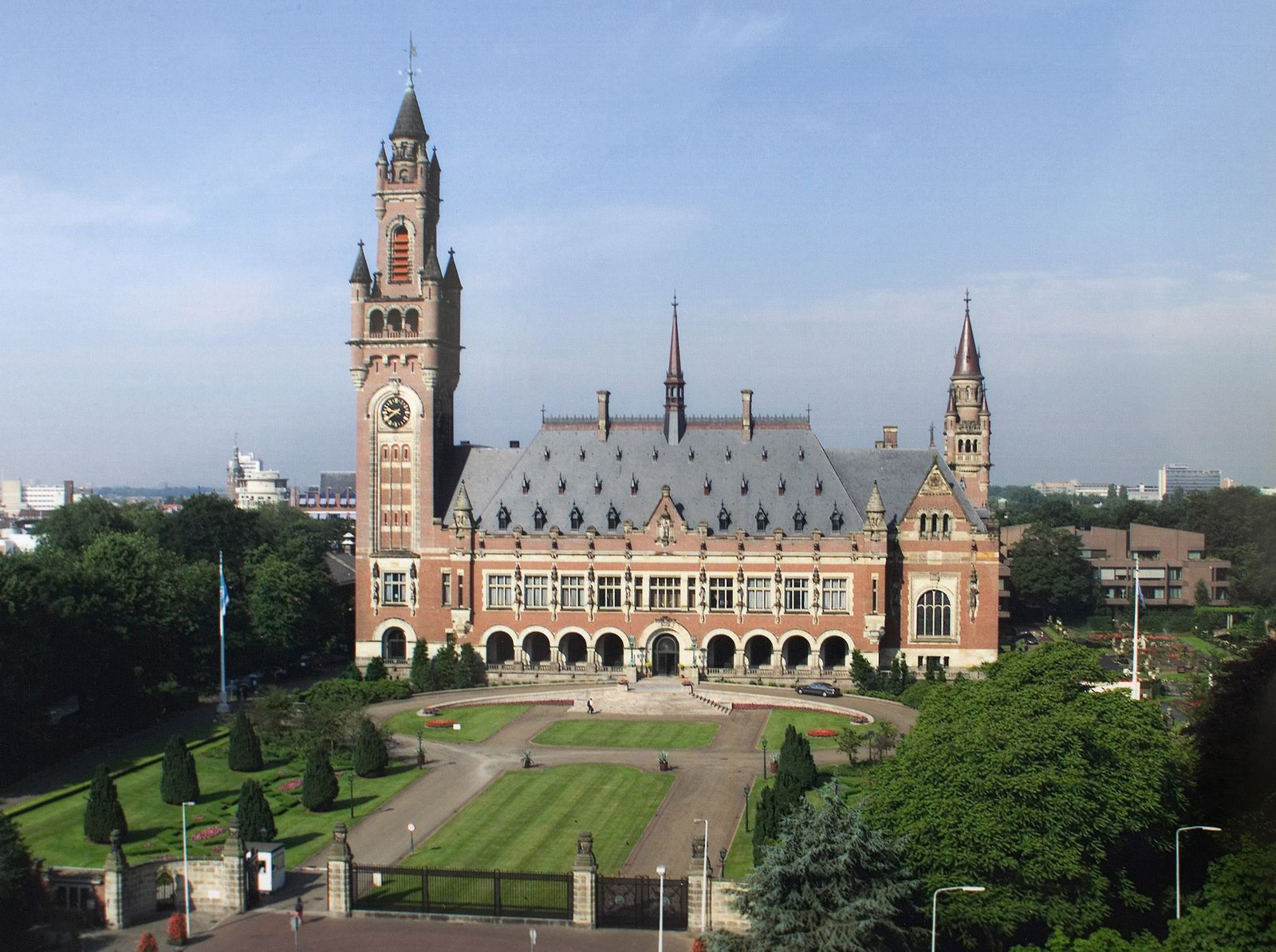
- May resolve non-compulsory recommendations to states or suggestions to the Security Council (UNSC);
- Decides on the admission of new members, following proposal by the UNSC;
- Adopts the budget;
- Elects the non-permanent members of the UNSC; all members of the Economic and Social Council; the UN Secretary-General (following their proposal by the UNSC); and the fifteen judges of the International Court of Justice (ICJ). Each country has one vote.
- Supports the other UN bodies administratively (for example, in the organization of conferences, the writing of reports and studies and the preparation of the budget);
- Its chairperson—the UN Secretary-General—is elected by the General Assembly for a five-year mandate and is the UN's foremost representative.
- Decides disputes between states that recognize its jurisdiction;
- Issues legal opinions;
- Renders judgment by relative majority. Its fifteen judges are elected by the UN General Assembly for nine-year terms.

UN Security Council
— For international security issues —
UN Economic and Social Council
— For global economic and social affairs —
UN Trusteeship Council
— For administering trust territories (currently inactive) —
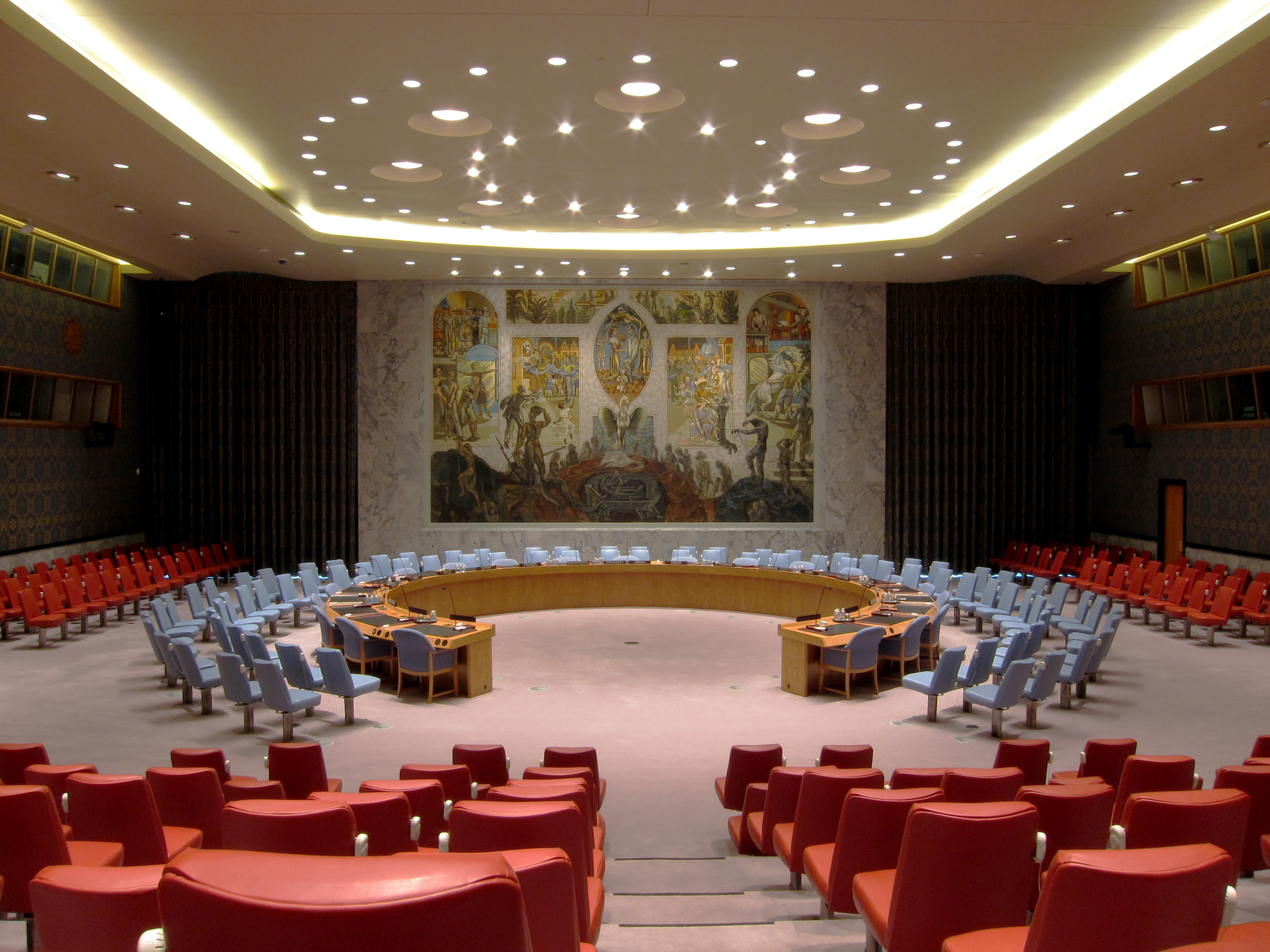
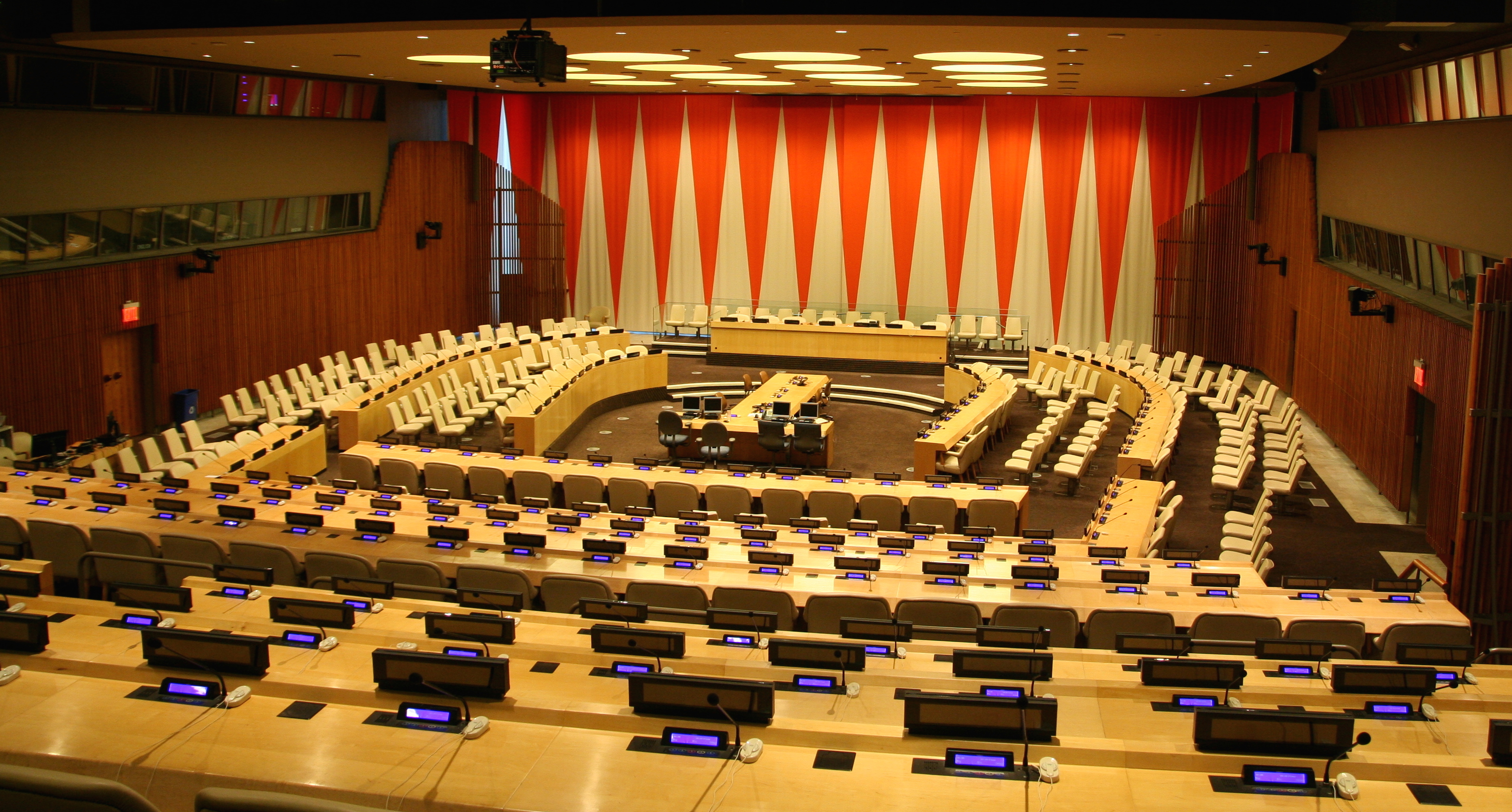
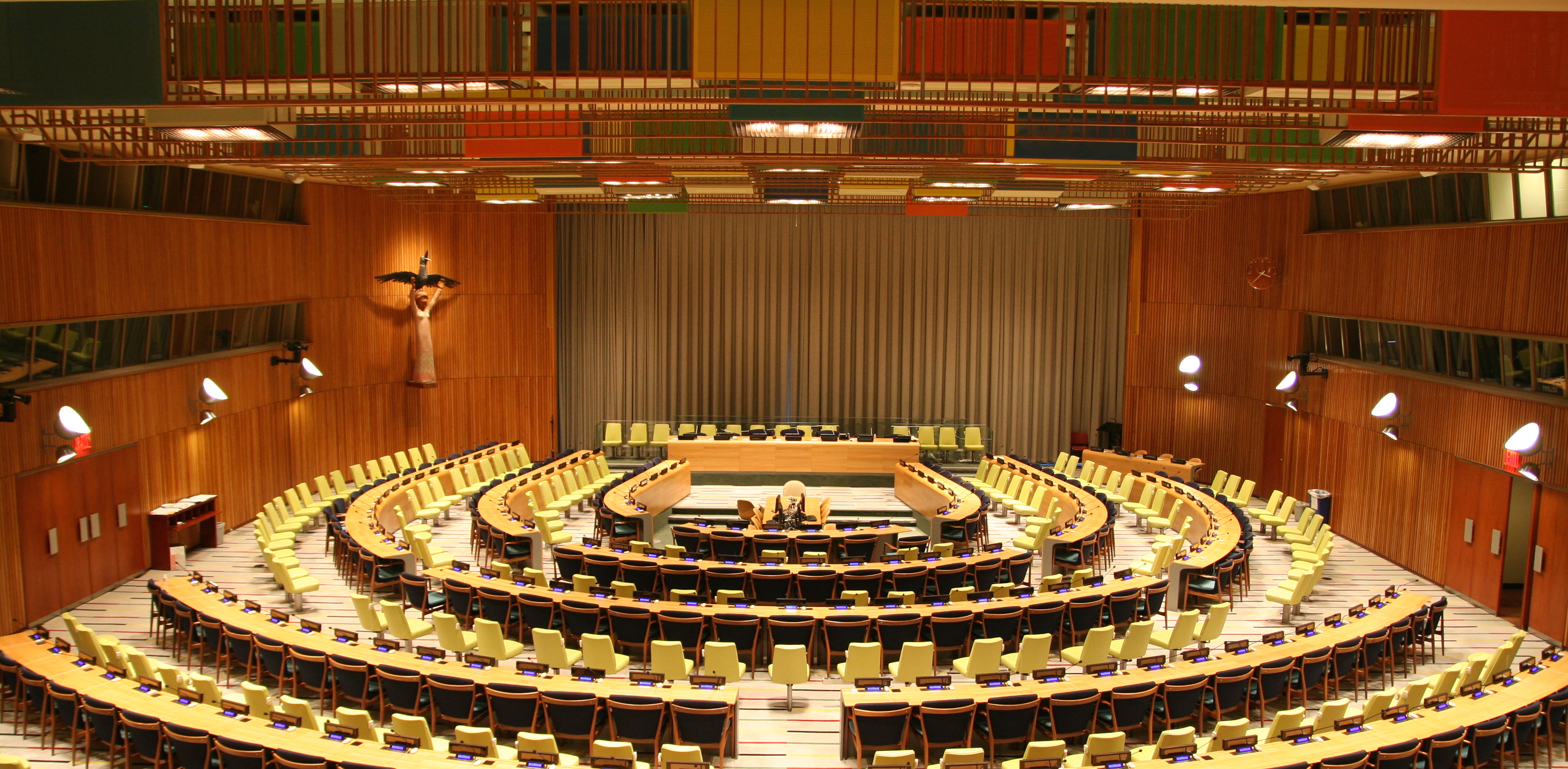
- Responsible for the maintenance of international peace and security;
- May adopt compulsory resolutions;
- Has fifteen members: five permanent members with veto power and ten elected members.
- Responsible for co-operation between states as regards economic and social matters;
- Co-ordinates co-operation between the UN's numerous specialized agencies;
- Has 54 members, elected by the General Assembly to serve staggered three-year mandates.
- Was originally designed to manage colonial possessions that were former League of Nations mandates;
- Has been inactive since 1994, when Palau, the last trust territory, attained independence.

=== General Assembly ===
The United Nations General Assembly (UNGA) consists of all United Nations Member States and meets in regular session once a year under a president elected from among the representatives. Its powers are to oversee the budget of the United Nations, appoint the non-permanent members to the Security Council, receive reports from other parts of the United Nations and make recommendations in the form of General Assembly Resolutions. It has also established a wide number of subsidiary organs.

=== Security Council ===
The United Nations Security Council (UNSC) is charged with the maintenance of international peace and security. Its powers, outlined in the United Nations Charter, include the establishment of peacekeeping operations, the establishment of international sanctions, and the authorization of military action. Its powers are exercised through United Nations Security Council resolutions.

The Security Council held its first ever session on 17 January 1946 at Church House, Westminster, London. Since its first meeting, the council, which exists in continuous session, has travelled widely, holding meetings in many cities, such as Paris and Addis Ababa, as well as at its current permanent home at the United Nations Headquarters in New York City.

There are 15 members of the Security Council, consisting of five veto-wielding permanent members (China, France, Russia, the United Kingdom, and the United States) and 10 elected non-permanent members with two-year terms. This basic structure is set out in Chapter V of the UN Charter. Security Council members must always be present at UN headquarters in New York so that the Security Council can meet at any time.

=== Economic and Social Council ===
The United Nations Economic and Social Council (ECOSOC) is responsible for coordinating the economic, social, and related work of 15 UN specialized agencies, their functional commissions and five regional commissions. ECOSOC has 54 members; it holds a four-week session each year in July. Since 1998, it has also held a meeting each April with finance ministers heading key committees of the World Bank and the International Monetary Fund (IMF). The ECOSOC serves as the central forum for discussing international economic and social issues, and for formulating policy recommendations addressed to member states and the United Nations System.

=== Secretariat ===
The United Nations Secretariat is headed by the United Nations Secretary-General, assisted by a staff of international civil servants worldwide. It provides studies, information, and facilities needed by United Nations bodies for their meetings. It also carries out tasks as directed by the UN Security Council, the UN General Assembly, the UN Economic and Social Council, and other U.N. bodies. The United Nations Charter provides that the staff is to be chosen by application of the "highest standards of efficiency, competence, and integrity," with due regard for the importance of recruiting on a wide geographical basis.

The charter provides that the staff shall not seek or receive instructions from any authority other than the UN. Each UN member country is enjoined to respect the international character of the secretariat and not seek to influence its staff. The secretary-general alone is responsible for staff selection.

- Office of the United Nations High Commissioner for Human Rights (OHCHR)
- United Nations Office on Drugs and Crime (UNODC)
- United Nations Office of Internal Oversight Services (UN-OIOS)
- United Nations Office for Disaster Risk Reduction (UNDRR, formerly UNISDR)

=== International Court of Justice ===
The International Court of Justice is the primary judicial organ of the United Nations. It is based in the Peace Palace in The Hague, Netherlands. Its main functions are to settle legal disputes submitted to it by states and to provide advisory opinions on legal questions submitted to it by duly authorized international organs, agencies, and the UN General Assembly.

=== Trusteeship Council ===
The United Nations Trusteeship Council, one of the principal organs of the United Nations, was established to ensure that trust territories were administered in the best interests of their inhabitants and of international peace and security. The trust territories—most of them are former mandates of the League of Nations or territories taken from nations defeated at the end of World War II—have all now attained self-government or independence, either as separate nations or by joining neighbouring independent countries. The last was Palau, formerly part of the Trust Territory of the Pacific Islands, which became a member state of the United Nations in December 1994.

== Funds and programmes, research and training institutes, and other bodies ==
The separately administered funds and programmes, research and training institutes, and other subsidiary bodies are autonomous subsidiary organs of the United Nations.

=== Funds and programmes ===
Throughout its history the United Nations General Assembly has established a number of programmes and funds to address particular humanitarian and development concerns. These are financed through voluntary rather than assessed contributions. These bodies usually report to the General Assembly through an executive board. Only one UN programme has ever closed in the history of the organization, the United Nations Relief and Rehabilitation Administration (UNRRA), which ceased to exist in 1959 and was subsequently replaced by the UNHCR.

Each of the funds and programmes is headed by an executive director at the under-secretary-general level and is governed by an executive board. One former fund, the United Nations Development Fund for Women (UNIFEM), was merged with other elements of the United Nations System into a new organization, UN Women, in January 2011.

Programmes and funds of the United Nations
| Acronyms | Agency | Headquarters | Head | Established | Comment |
|---|---|---|---|---|---|
| UNDP | United Nations Development Programme | New York City, United States | (Belgium) Alexander De Croo | 1965 | |
| UNICEF | United Nations Children's Fund | New York City, United States | (United States) Catherine M. Russell | 1946 | |
| UNCDF | United Nations Capital Development Fund | New York City, United States | (Sri Lanka) Pradeep Kurukulasuriya | 1966 | Affiliated with the UNDP |
| WFP | World Food Programme | Rome, Italy | (United States) Luke Lindberg | 1963 | |
| UNEP | United Nations Environment Programme | Nairobi, Kenya | (Denmark) Inger Andersen | 1972 | |
| UNFPA | United Nations Population Fund | New York City, United States | (Guinea) Diene Keita | 1969 | |
| UN-HABITAT | United Nations Human Settlements Programme | Nairobi, Kenya | (Brazil) Anacláudia Rossbach | 1978 | |
| UNV | United Nations Volunteers | Bonn, Germany | (Russia) Toily Kurbanov | 1978 | Administered by UNDP |

=== Research and training institutes ===
Various institutes were established by the General Assembly to perform independent research and training. One former institute, the International Research and Training Institute for the Advancement of Women (INSTRAW), was merged with other elements of the United Nations System into a new organization, UN Women, in January 2011.

- United Nations Institute for Disarmament Research (UNIDIR)
- United Nations Institute for Training and Research (UNITAR)
- United Nations Interregional Crime and Justice Research Institute (UNICRI)
- United Nations Research Institute for Social Development (UNRISD)
- United Nations System Staff College (UNSSC)
- United Nations University (UNU)

=== Secretariats of conventions ===
- Convention on the Rights of Persons with Disabilities
- UNCCD – United Nations Convention to Combat Desertification
- UNFCCC – United Nations Framework Convention on Climate Change
- CBD – Convention on Biological Diversity
- UNCLOS – United Nations Convention on the Law of the Sea established bodies:
  - ISA – International Seabed Authority
  - ITLOS – International Tribunal for the Law of the Sea
- UNCRC – United Nations Convention on the Rights of the Child

=== Other entities and bodies ===
- Joint United Nations Programme on HIV/AIDS (UNAIDS)
- International Trade Centre (ITC)
- United Nations Office for Project Services (UNOPS)
- United Nations Conference on Trade and Development (UNCTAD)

Other Entities and Bodies
| Acronyms | Agency | Headquarters | Head | Established | Comment |
|---|---|---|---|---|---|
| UNHCR | United Nations High Commissioner for Refugees | Geneva, Switzerland | (Iraq) Barham Salih | 1951 | |
| UN WOMEN | United Nations Entity for Gender Equality and the Empowerment of Women | New York City, United States | (Jordan) Sima Sami Bahous | 2010 | Created by the merger of the Division for the Advancement of Women (DAW), the International Research and Training Institute for the Advancement of Women (INSTRAW), the Office of the Special Adviser on Gender Issues and Advancement of Women (OSAGI) and the United Nations Development Fund for Women (UNIFEM) |
| UNRWA | United Nations Relief and Works Agency for Palestine Refugees in the Near East | Gaza, Palestine and Amman, Jordan | (United Kingdom) Christian Saunders | 1949 | |

== Specialized agencies ==
The specialized agencies are autonomous organizations working with the United Nations and each other through the co-ordinating machinery of the Economic and Social Council and the Chief Executives Board for Coordination. Each was integrated into the UN System by way of an agreement with the UN under UN Charter article 57 (except ICSID and MIGA, both part of the World Bank Group).

- Food and Agriculture Organization (FAO)
- International Civil Aviation Organization (ICAO)
- International Fund for Agricultural Development (IFAD)
- International Labour Organization (ILO)
- International Maritime Organization (IMO)
- International Monetary Fund (IMF)
- International Telecommunication Union (ITU)
- United Nations Educational, Scientific and Cultural Organization (UNESCO)
- United Nations Industrial Development Organization (UNIDO)
- Universal Postal Union (UPU)
- World Bank Group (WBG)
  - International Bank for Reconstruction and Development (IBRD)
  - International Centre for Settlement of Investment Disputes (ICSID)
  - International Development Association (IDA)
  - International Finance Corporation (IFC)
  - Multilateral Investment Guarantee Agency (MIGA)
- World Health Organization (WHO)
- World Intellectual Property Organization (WIPO)
- World Meteorological Organization (WMO)
- United Nations World Tourism Organization (UN Tourism)
- International Refugee Organization (IRO); ceased to exist in 1952

== Related organizations ==
Some organizations have a relationship with the UN defined by an arrangement different from the agreements between the specialized agencies and the UN, which are established under Articles 57 and 63 of the United Nations Charter.

=== International Organization for Migration (IOM) ===
The IOM, established in 1951, is the leading inter-governmental organization in the field of migration and works closely with governmental, intergovernmental and non-governmental partners. IOM works to help ensure the orderly and humane management of migration, to promote international cooperation on migration issues, to assist in the search for practical solutions to migration problems and to provide humanitarian assistance to migrants in need, including refugees and internally displaced people. In September 2016, IOM joined the United Nations System as a related organization during the United Nations General Assembly high-level summit to address large movements of refugees and migrants.

=== Comprehensive Nuclear-Test-Ban Treaty Organization Preparatory Commission (CTBTO PrepCom) ===
The CTBTO PrepCom reports to the UN General Assembly.

=== International Atomic Energy Agency (IAEA) ===
The relationship between the IAEA and the UN was established by a resolution of the UN General Assembly. Unlike the specialized agencies which report to ECOSOC, the IAEA reports to the General Assembly as well as the Security Council. Like the other specialized agency's heads, their executives are part of the United Nations System Chief Executives' Board for Coordination (CEB).

=== Organisation for the Prohibition of Chemical Weapons (OPCW) ===
The OPCW is not an agency of the United Nations, but cooperates both on policy and practical issues. On 7 September 2000 the OPCW and the UN signed a co-operation agreement outlining how they were to co-ordinate their activities. Under this agreement, the OPCW reports to the UN General Assembly.

=== World Trade Organization (WTO) ===
The WTO does not have a formal agreement with the UN. Instead, their relationship is governed by exchanges of letters. Unlike the specialized agencies and the IAEA, the WTO has no reporting obligations towards any of the principal organs of the UN, but provides ad hoc contribution to the work of the General Assembly and ECOSOC. The WTO has a seat on the CEB.

== Chief Executives Board and Senior Management Group ==
The United Nations Chief Executives' Board for Coordination (CEB) brings together on a regular basis the executive heads of the organizations of the United Nations System, under the chairmanship of the secretary-general of the UN. The CEB aims to further co-ordination and co-operation on a whole range of substantive and management issues facing UN System organizations. In addition to its regular reviews of contemporary political issues and major concerns facing the UN System, the CEB approves policy statements on behalf of the UN System as a whole. Three committees report to the CEB, namely the High-level Committee on Programme (HCLP), the High-level Committee on Management (HCLM) and the United Nations Development Group (UNDG). Each of those bodies has, in turn, developed a subsidiary machinery of regular and ad hoc bodies on the substantive and managerial aspects of inter-agency co-ordination. The committee structure is supported by a CEB secretariat located in New York and Geneva.

There is also a Senior Management Group, composed of some of the senior officials in the secretariat and the funds and programmes at the Under-Secretary-General and Assistant Secretary-General rank, which serves as the cabinet of the Secretary-General.

== United Nations common system ==
The United Nations, its subsidiary bodies, thirteen of the specialized agencies (ILO, FAO, UNESCO, WHO, ICAO, UPU, ITU, WMO, IMO, WIPO, IFAD, UNIDO, and UNWTO), and one related body (IAEA) are part of the United Nations common system of salaries, allowances, and benefits administered by the International Civil Service Commission. Most, but not all, of the members of the United Nations System are part of the common system; the Bretton Woods institutions (i.e. the World Bank Group and the IMF) are notable exceptions. The WTO utilizes the OECD common system. The UN common system was established to prevent competition amongst organizations of the United Nations System for staff and to facilitate co-operation and exchange between organizations.

Some international organizations that are not part of the United Nations System (and therefore not members of the common system) but who voluntarily follow the policies of the common system in whole or in part include:

- Organization for Security and Co-operation in Europe (OSCE)
- Organization of American States (OAS)

== See also ==
- Collective security
- International order
- League of Nations, for a rudimentary model on which the UN System is based
- List of United Nations organizations by location
- Member states of the United Nations
- Outline of the United Nations
- Post-war
- Special Service Agreement
- Vienna formula
