= Working language =

Language given a unique legal status in a supranational society

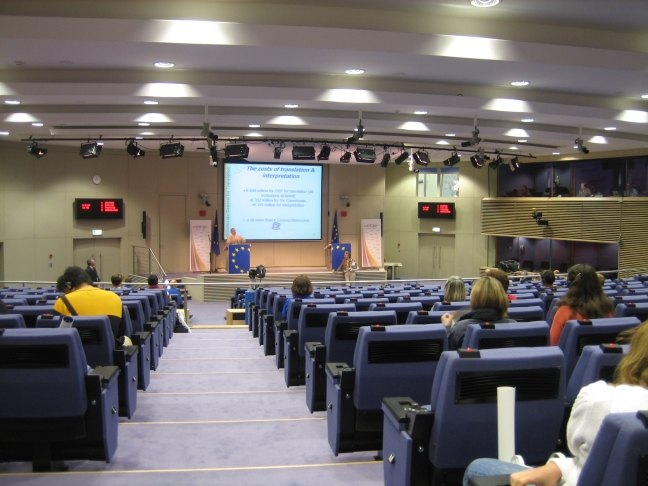
Press room of the European Commission inside the Berlaymont building, Brussels. 2007.

A working language (also procedural language) is a language that is given a unique legal status in a supranational company, society, state or other body or organization as its primary means of communication. It is primarily the language of daily correspondence and conversation, since the organization usually has members with various differing language backgrounds.

Most international organizations have working languages for their bodies. For a given organization, a working language may or may not also be an official language.

== United Nations working languages ==
Originally, English and French were the working languages at the UN. Later, Arabic, Chinese, Russian, and Spanish were added as working languages in the General Assembly and in the Economic and Social Council. Currently, Arabic, Chinese, English, French, Russian, and Spanish are the working languages of the Security Council.

== Examples of common international organizations ==
=== English and French ===
The International Criminal Court has two working languages: English and French. The Council of Europe, the OECD, and NATO also have English and French as their two working languages.

The World Organization of the Scout Movement (WOSM) has English and French as official languages, with Arabic, Russian, and Spanish as additional working languages.

=== Portuguese and Spanish ===
The Organization of Ibero-American States (OEI), Ibero-American General Secretariat (SEGIB), Mercosur, and the Latin American Integration Association have two working languages: Portuguese and Spanish.

=== Other groups with one or two working languages ===
- The Pacific Alliance and the Central American Integration System have Spanish as their sole working language.
- The Arctic Council Indigenous Peoples Secretariat has English as its sole working language, though communications are also published in Russian. Although many circumpolar indigenous people speak either an Inuit dialect, a variety of Saami or a Uralic language, English is likely to be the second or third language that many of them will have in common.
- The Shanghai Cooperation Organisation has two working languages: Russian and Chinese.
- The government of East Timor has Indonesian and English as working languages alongside its official languages (Tetum and Portuguese) and 15 other recognized local languages
- The state of Goa in India has Marathi as its working language, but only Konkani has official status in the state.
- English is the working language in ASEAN and the Commonwealth of Nations.
- Greenland has demoted Danish from a co-official language to a working language for pragmatic reasons, since spoken and written Danish remains dominant across several sectors of society, such as health care and higher education.

=== English, French, and Spanish ===
The World Trade Organization, the International Federation of Journalists, the International Telecommunication Union, the International Maritime Organization, the International Labour Organization, NAFTA, the International Union for Conservation of Nature, and the Free Trade Area of the Americas all have three working languages: English, French, and Spanish.

=== Other groups with three or more working languages ===
- The European Commission has three working languages: English, French, and German.
- FIFA has four working languages: English, French, German, and Spanish. Formerly, French was the organization's sole official language. Currently, English is the official language for minutes, correspondence, and announcements.
- The African Union currently uses Arabic, English, French, Portuguese, Spanish, and Swahili.
- The Southern African Development Community has four working languages: Afrikaans, English, French, and Portuguese.
- The Nordic Council has three working languages: Danish, Swedish, and Norwegian. The Council refers to the languages as dialects of a "united Scandinavian language".
- The Organization of American States has four working languages: English, French, Portuguese, and Spanish.
- The International Organization of Turkic Culture has three working languages: English, Turkish, and Russian.

== See also ==
- Heritage language
- Lingua franca
- International auxiliary language
- List of official languages of international organizations
