= Special Service Agreement =

A Special Service Agreement (SSA) is a contract modality in the United Nations system, establishing a legal relation between the Organization and the individual, where the individual is a contractor or supplier of services, rather than a staff member. This modality is often used for very short contracts, when the Organization does not wish to assume the burden of complex bureaucracy related to hiring a new staff member, and deal with complex entitlements and benefits.

For the individual, this contract modality has the advantage of higher cash remuneration (ranging from USD 1,000 to 15,000 per month depending on the position), but the disadvantage of no benefits such as pension, insurance, etc.

The modality is frequently used by the United Nations Development Programme and the United Nations Children's Fund, and less frequently in the Secretariat.

== See also ==
Personnel Service Agreement is an employment contract in a United Nations agency, which is not governed by the Staff Regulations and Rules of the United Nations. A PSA and an SSA are not staff contracts. An initial SPA appointment shall normally be for a period of one year, with the possibility of renewal on a rolling, fixed-term basis; however, the combined total appointment shall not exceed six years.
