= List of international organisations which have French as an official language =

List of international organisations which have French as an official, administrative or working language.

Organisation	Number of official languages	French name	Headquarters	Note
Francophonie	1	Organisation Internationale de la Francophonie	Paris, France	The community of French-speaking nations
AU	5 (Languages of the AU)	Union africaine	Addis Ababa, Ethiopia	French is an official language in 21 member states and a commonly used language in four others.
Amnesty International	5 (Portuguese, English, Spanish, Arabic)	Amnesty International	London, United Kingdom	
ACS	3 (English, Spanish)	Association des États de la Caraïbe	Port of Spain, Trinidad and Tobago	
ATS	4 (English, Russian, Spanish)	Secrétariat du Traité sur l'Antarctique	Buenos Aires, Argentina	
BIE	2 (English)	Bureau International des Expositions	Paris, France	
BIPM	2 (English)	Bureau international des poids et mesures	Sèvres, France	
CAS	2 (English)	Tribunal Arbitral du Sport	Lausanne, Switzerland	
CCJ	3 (English, Dutch)	Cour Caribéenne de Justice	Port of Spain, Trinidad and Tobago	
CEN-SAD	4 (Arabic, English, Portuguese)	Communauté des États Sahélo-Sahariens	Tripoli, Libya	
CMAS	3 (English, Spanish)	Confédération Mondiale des Activités Subaquatiques	Rome, Italy	
CoE	2 (English)	Conseil de l'Europe	Strasbourg, France	
COMESA	3 (English, Portuguese)	Marché commun de l'Afrique orientale et australe	Tripoli, Libya	
EBU	2 (English)	Union européenne de radio-télévision	Geneva, Switzerland	
ECCAS	3 (Portuguese, Spanish)	Communauté Économique des États d'Afrique Centrale	Libreville, Gabon	
ECMWF	3 (English, German)	Centre européen de prévision météorologique à moyen terme	Reading, Berkshire, United Kingdom	
ECOWAS	3 (English, Portuguese)	Communauté économique des États de l'Afrique de l'Ouest	Abuja, Nigeria	
ESA	3 (English, German)	Agence spatiale européenne	Paris, France	
EU	24 (Languages of the EU)	Union européenne	Brussels, Belgium	The European Commission, conducts its internal business in three languages - English, French and German
EUMETSAT	2 (English)	Organisation européenne pour l'exploitation des satellites météorologiques	Darmstadt, Germany	
FAI	2 (English)	Fédération Aéronautique Internationale	Lausanne, Switzerland	
FAO	6 (Arabic, Chinese, English, Russian, Spanish)	Organisation des Nations Unies pour l'alimentation et l'agriculture	Rome, Italy	
FATF	2 (English)	Groupe d'action financière	Paris, France	
FEI	2 (English)	Fédération Équestre Internationale	Lausanne, Switzerland	
FIA	2 (English)	Fédération Internationale de l'Automobile	Paris, France	
FIAPF	2 (English)	Fédération Internationale des Associations de Producteurs de Films	Paris, France	
FIBA	2 (English)	Fédération Internationale de Basketball	Geneva, Switzerland	
FIBT	3 (English, German)	Fédération Internationale de Bobsleigh et de Tobogganing	Milan, Italy	
FIDE	2 (English)	Fédération Internationale des Échecs	Athens, Greece	
FIE	3 (English, Spanish)	Fédération Internationale d'Escrime	Lausanne, Switzerland	
FIFA	4 (English, German, Spanish)	Fédération Internationale de Football Association	Zürich, Switzerland	
FIG	2 (English)	Fédération Internationale de Gymnastique	Lausanne, Switzerland	
FIH	2 (English)	Fédération Internationale de Hockey sur Gazon	Lausanne, Switzerland	
FIL	3 (English, German)	Fédération Internationale de Luge de Course	Berchtesgaden, Germany	
FILA	2 (English)	Fédération Internationale des Luttes Associées	Lausanne, Switzerland	
FIM	2 (English)	Fédération Internationale de Motocyclisme	Mies, Switzerland	
FINA	2 (English)	Fédération Internationale de Natation	Lausanne, Switzerland	
FIQ	2 (English)	Fédération Internationale des Quilleurs	Pasig, Philippines	
FIRS	2 (English)	Fédération Internationale de Roller Sports	Rome, Italy	
FIS	3 (English, German)	Fédération Internationale de Ski	Oberhofen am Thunersee, Switzerland	
FISA	2 (English)	Fédération Internationale des Sociétés d'Aviron	Lausanne, Switzerland	
FITA	2 (English)	Fédération Internationale de Tir à l'Arc	Lausanne, Switzerland	
FIVB	2 (English)	Fédération Internationale de Volleyball	Lausanne, Switzerland	
IACtHR	4 (Spanish, English, Portuguese)	Cour interaméricaine des droits de l'homme	San José, Costa Rica	
IATA	3 (English, Spanish)	Association du transport aérien international		
ICAO	6 (Arabic, Chinese, English, Russian, Spanish)	Organisation de l'aviation civile internationale (OACI)	Montréal, Quebec, Canada	
ICC	2 (English)	Cour Pénale Internationale	The Hague, Netherlands	
ICJ	2 (English)	Cour internationale de Justice	The Hague, Netherlands	
ICOMOS	2 (English)	Conseil international des monuments et des sites	Paris, France	
IFJ	3 (English, Spanish)	Fédération internationale des journalistes	Brussels, Belgium	
IGAD	2 (English)	Autorité intergouvernementale pour le développement	Djibouti, Djibouti	
IGU	2 (English)	Union Géographique Internationale	Brussels, Belgium	
IHO	2 (English)	Organisation hydrographique internationale	Monaco	
ILO	2 (English)	Organisation internationale du Travail	Geneva, Switzerland	
International Red Cross and Red Crescent Movement	7 (English, German, Spanish, Arabic, Portuguese, Russian)	Mouvement international de la Croix-Rouge et du Croissant-Rouge	Geneva, Switzerland	
Interpol	4 (Arabic, English, Spanish)	Interpol	Lyon, France	
IOC	2 (English)	Comité International Olympique	Lausanne, Switzerland	
IOM	3 (English, Spanish)	Organisation Internationale pour les Migration	Geneva, Switzerland	
IPSA	2 (English)	Association internationale de science politique	Montreal, Quebec, Canada	
IPU	2 (English)	L'Union interparlementaire	Geneva, Switzerland	
ISA	3 (English, Spanish)	Autorité internationale des fonds marins	Kingston, Jamaica	
ISO	3 (English, Russian)	Organisation internationale de normalisation	Geneva, Switzerland	
ISW	3 (English, Spanish)	Secrétariat International de l'Eau	Montreal, Quebec, Canada	
ITU	6 (Arabic, Chinese, English, Russian, Spanish)	Union internationale des télécommunications	Geneva, Switzerland	
ITUC	4 (English, Spanish, German)	Confédération syndicale internationale	Brussels, Belgium	
IUCN	3 (English, Spanish)	Union Internationale pour la Conservation de la Nature	Gland, Switzerland	
Latin Union	6 (Catalan, Italian, Portuguese, Romanian, Spanish)	Union Latine	Paris, France	
MSF		Médecins sans frontières	Geneva, Switzerland	
NAFTA	3 (English, Spanish)	Accord de libre-échange nord-américain	Mexico City, Ottawa and Washington, D.C.	
NATO	2 (English)	Organisation du traité de l'Atlantique Nord	Brussels, Belgium	
OAS	4 (English, Portuguese, Spanish)	Organisation des États Américains	Washington, D.C., US	
OECD	2 (English)	Organisation de coopération et de développement économiques	Paris, France	
OECS	2 (English)	Organisation des États de la Caraïbe orientale	Castries, Saint Lucia	
World Intellectual Property Organization	10 (Arabic, Portuguese, English, Chinese, Russian, Spanish, German, Japanese and Korean)	Organisation mondiale de la propriété intellectuelle	Geneva, Switzerland	
OIC	3 (Arabic, English)	Organisation de la conférence islamique	Jeddah, Saudi Arabia	
OIV	3 (English, Spanish)	Organisation internationale de la vigne et du vin	Paris, France	
OPCW	6 (Arabic, Chinese, English, Russian, Spanish)	Organisation pour l'interdiction des armes chimiques	The Hague, Netherlands	
OSCE	6 (English, German, Italian, Russian, Spanish)	Organisation pour la sécurité et la coopération en Europe	Vienna, Austria	
PIF	16	Forum des îles du Pacifique	Suva, Fiji	
RWB	4 (English, German, Spanish)	Reporters sans frontières	Paris, France	
SADC	3 (English, Portuguese)	Communauté de Développement de l'Afrique Australe	Gaborone, Botswana	
UCI	2 (English)	Union Cycliste Internationale	Aigle, Switzerland	
UEFA	3 (English, German)	Union Européenne de Football Association	Nyon, Switzerland	
UIAA	2 (English)	Union Internationale des Associations d'Alpinisme	Bern, Switzerland	
UIM	2 (English)	Union Internationale Motonautique	Monaco	
UMB	2 (English)	Union Mondiale de Billard	Madrid, Spain	
UNESCO	9 (Arabic, Chinese, English, Portuguese, Hindi, Italian, Russian and Spanish)	Organisation des Nations Unies pour l'éducation, la science et la culture	Paris, France	
UN (and all its agencies)	6 (Arabic, Chinese, English, Russian, Spanish)	Organisation des Nations Unies	New York, US	The Secretariat uses two working languages, English and French.
UNWTO	5 (Arabic, English, Russian, Spanish)	Organisation mondiale du tourisme	Madrid, Spain	
UPU	2 (English)	Union postale universelle	Bern, Switzerland	French is still the sole official language of the UPU; English was added only as a working language in 1994
WADA	2 (English)	Agence mondiale antidopage	Montreal, Quebec, Canada	
WAN	4 (English, German, Spanish)	Association mondiale des journaux	Paris, France	
WBSC	6 (Chinese, English, Japanese, Korean, Spanish)	Confédération internationale de baseball et softball	Lausanne, Switzerland	Established in 2013 from merger of IBAF and ISF
WEU	2 (English)	Union de l'Europe Occidentale	Brussels, Belgium	WEU ceased to exist in 2011
WTO	3 (English, Spanish)	Organisation Mondiale du Commerce	Geneva, Switzerland	
ZPCAS	4 (English, Portuguese, Spanish)	Zone de Paix et de Coopération de l'Atlantique Sud	Brasília, Brazil	

== Notes and references ==
CISM 4 (Arabic, English, Spanish) Conseil International du Sport Militaire Brussels, Belgium

== See also ==
- List of countries where French is an official language
- List of international organisations which have Portuguese as an official language
- Co-ordinated organisations: 6 organisations which all have French as official language. Many of the 26 "follower" organisations mentioned also have French as official language.
