= Co-ordinated Organisation =

The expression Co-ordinated Organisation refers to several intergovernmental organisations that have a common system of remuneration and pensions, and who are members of the Co-ordination System.

== List of Co-ordinated Organisations ==
There are currently six members of the Co-ordinated Organisations. On 31 March 2010, the Western European Union was dissolved by the ten member countries and its competences were transferred to the European Union. EUMETSAT joined Co-ordination on 1 July 2012.

- The Council of Europe (CoE)
- The European Centre for Medium-Range Weather Forecasts (ECMWF)
- The European Space Agency (ESA)
- The European Organisation for the Exploitation of Meteorological Satellites (EUMETSAT)
- The North Atlantic Treaty Organization (NATO)
- The Organisation for Economic Co-operation and Development (OECD)
  - The Western European Union (WEU) (Formerly a member of the Co-ordinated Organisations - Now defunct)

== Role of Co-ordination ==
The Co-ordinated Organisation system includes three different Committees:

- The Co-ordinating Committee on Remuneration (CCR),
- The Committee of Representatives of the Secretaries/ Directors General (CRSG),
- The Committee of Staff Representatives (CRP).

The three committees meet separately, as well as in bilateral and tripartite meetings.

The main role of the CCR is advisory and is to make recommendations on remuneration and pension-related matters to Councils of the Co-ordinated Organisations. Although all member countries of each organisation may participate in the committee, many choose for different reasons not to do so. Representatives generally come from the respective governments' Finance, Interior or Foreign Ministries, or from national delegations to one of the Co-ordinated Organisations (see below).

The CRSG is composed of the Heads of Administration of the different organisations or of their representatives in charge of remuneration matters. The CRSG prepares proposals and documents on remuneration and pensions for discussion in tripartite, bilateral or individual meetings of the committees.

The CRP includes staff of the different organisations and are represented at tripartite meetings with the CCR and the CRSG. The CRP has a consultative role.

The principal aim of the Co-ordination system is to provide recommendations on issues concerning salaries and allowances to the Governing bodies of the Co-ordinated Organisations, in order to remove separate detailed discussions on these issues from each of them, as well as from their budget committees. These recommendations concern particularly:

- Basic salary scales, and the method of their adjustment, for all categories of staff and for all member countries where there are active staff or recipients of a pension;
- Pension Scheme Rules;

They also provide recommendations concerning the function, amount and the method of adjustment of the:

- Expatriation allowance,
- Household allowance,
- Installation allowance,
- Dependant's allowance,
- Daily subsistence allowance,
- Kilometric allowance,
- Expatriated child allowance,
- Education allowance,
- Allowance for a handicapped child.

The Co-ordinated Organisations have technical support section based in Paris at the Organisation for Economic Co-operation and Development: the International Service for Remunerations and Pensions (ISRP).

The ISRP is responsible for the management and review of all matters pertaining to the remuneration of staff and the Pension Scheme common to the Co-ordinated Organisations. The Service is made up of four Units, whose functions revolve around four key activities:

- pensions administration;
- studies and analysis;
- the management of pension reserve funds; and
- overseeing the secretariat of the statutory consultation bodies of the Co-ordinated Organisations.

There are also 25 non co-ordinated international organisations employing over 13 000 staff members which either apply the Co-ordinated scales, or follow them closely.

== Linguistic rules of the coordinated organisations ==
Source: "Rapport d'Information déposé par la délégation de l'Assemblée Nationale pour l'Union Européenne sur la diversité linguistique", of Michel Herbillon, member of the French National Assembly.

| Organisation | Official languages | Recognized Working languages | Used language(s) |
|---|---|---|---|
| Council of Europe | English, French | English, French, German, Italian, Russian | English, French |
| ECMWF | English, French, German | English, French, German | English |
| ESA | English, French | English, French | English, French |
| EUMETSAT | English, French | English, French | English |
| NATO | English, French (Note: according to article 9 of the North Atlantic Treaty: "English and French shall be the official languages for the entire North Atlantic Treaty Organization"; and to the North Atlantic Treaty Article 14: "(..) the English and French texts [of the Treaty] are equally authentic (...)") | English, French | English |
| OECD | English, French | English, French | English, French |

== Other non-member institutions that observe similar rules ==
Around 25 "non-coordinated" international organisations follow the Co-ordinated scales or use them as a benchmark.

| INSTITUTION | HQ | www |
|---|---|---|
| CERN European Organization for Nuclear Research | Meyrin (Canton of Geneva) | http://public.web.cern.ch/ |
| ECO European Communications Office (Cf. European Conference of Postal and Telecommunications Administrations) | Copenhagen (Denmark) | http://www.ero.dk |
| ECS Energy Charter Secretariat (European Energy Charter) | Brussels (Belgium) | http://www.encharter.org |
| EFTA European Free Trade Association | Geneva (Switzerland) | http://www.efta.int |
| EMBL European Molecular Biology Laboratory | Heidelberg (Germany) | http://www.embl.org |
| EPO European Patent Organisation | Munich (Germany) | http://www.epo.org |
| ESO European Southern Observatory | Garching near Munich (Germany) | http://www.eso.org |
| EUREKA E! | Brussels (Belgium) | http://www.eurekanetwork.org |
| EU SatCen European Union Satellite Centre | Torrejón de Ardoz near Madrid (Spain) | http://www.satcen.europa.eu |
| GBIF Global Biodiversity Information Facility | Copenhagen (Denmark) | https://www.gbif.org |
| HCCH Hague Conference on Private International Law | The Hague (Netherlands) | http://www.hcch.net |
| HFSPO Human Frontier Science Program Organization | Strasbourg (France) | http://www.hfsp.org/ |
| ICC (International Criminal Court) | The Hague (Netherlands) | www2.icc-cpi.int |
| ITER | Saint-Paul-les-Durance (France) | http://www.iter.org |
| NASCO North Atlantic Salmon Conservation Organization | Edinburgh (United Kingdom) | https://web.archive.org/web/20110501054735/http://www.nasco.int/ |
| OCCAR Organisation for Joint Armament Cooperation | Bonn (Germany) | https://web.archive.org/web/20061109052613/http://www.occar-ea.org/ |
| OSPAR Oslo and Paris Commissions | London | http://www.ospar.org |
| PCA Permanent Court of Arbitration | The Hague (Netherlands) | http://www.pca-cpa.org |
| SPC (Secretariat of the Pacific Community) | Noumea (Nouvelle-Caledonie, France) | www.spc.int |
| UNIDROIT International Institute for the Unification of Private Law | Rome (Italy) | https://web.archive.org/web/20050820161131/http://www.unidroit.org/ |
| WCO World Customs Organization | Brussels (Belgium) | http://www.wcoomd.org/ |
| WTO World Trade Organization | Geneva (Switzerland) | http://www.wto.org |
| CEB (Council of Europe Development Bank) | Paris (France) | http://www.coebank.org/ www.coe.int |
| OBS (European Audiovisual Observatory ) | Strasbourg (France) | www.coe.int |
| IEA (International Energy Agency) | Paris (France) | www.oecd.org |
| NEA (Nuclear Energy Agency) | Paris (France) | www.oecd-nea.org |

== See also ==
- United Nations System
