= Lists of countries and territories by official language =

This is a list of lists of countries and territories by official language.

- List of countries and territories where Afrikaans or Dutch are official languages
- List of countries and territories where Arabic is an official language
- List of countries and territories where Chinese is an official language
- List of countries and territories where English is an official language
- List of countries and territories where French is an official language
- List of countries and territories where German is an official language
- List of countries and territories where Persian is an official language
- List of countries and territories where Romanian is an official language
- List of countries and territories where Russian is an official language
- List of countries and territories where Spanish is an official language
- List of countries and territories where Tamil is an official language

== Other official languages ==
=== Greek ===
Country	Region	Population	Status
Greece	Europe	10,372,335	Official language
Cyprus	Asia	1,320,525	Co-official language with Turkish
Total		11,692,860	

=== Hindustani ===
Country	Region	Population	Status
India	Asia	1,367,703,110	Hindi is one of the two official union languages of India alongside English. Hindi and Urdu (both registers of Hindustani language) are official languages along with 20 others under the Eighth Schedule of Constitution of India.
Pakistan	Asia	220,892,331	Urdu is co-official with English.
Fiji	Oceania	889,327	Hindi is official alongside English and Fijian. Although the basilect Fiji Hindi koine spoken at home and on the street is based on Awadhi, an Eastern Hindi language and not Hindustani, the prestige dialect (acrolect) and language of education is standard Indian Hindi.

=== Italian ===
Italian Linguasphere.Legend Native language Administrative language Secondary language or non-official. Italophone minorities

Country	Region	Population	Status
Italy	Europe	60,198,633	Official language
Switzerland	Europe	8,619,259	Co-official language with German, French, and Romansh
Croatia	Europe	208,055	Istria County
Slovenia	Europe	93,089	Slovene Istria
San Marino	Europe	33,607	Official language
Vatican City	Europe	825	Co-official language with Latin
Total		69,153,468	

=== Malay ===
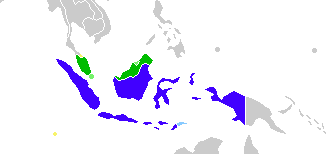
Malay Linguasphere. Indonesia Malaysia Singapore and Brunei, where Standard Malay is an official language East Timor, where Indonesian is a working language Southern Thailand and the Cocos Isl., where other varieties of Malay are spoken

Country	Region	Population	Primary Language?	Notes
Brunei	Asia	417,200	Yes	
Cocos (Keeling) Islands	Oceania	596	Yes (along with English)	Cocos Malay and English are the official languages. Cocos Malay is a dialect of Malay with some different features. The Cocos (Keeling) Islands are an Australian external territory.
Indonesia	Asia	237,424,363	Yes (as Indonesian language, not Malay language)	Malay language in Indonesia is considered a regional language (bahasa daerah), on part with regional languages spoken in the regions of Sumatra and Kalimantan
Malaysia	Asia	30,018,242	Yes	
Singapore	Asia	5,469,700	Yes (along with English, Mandarin & Tamil)	
Total		273,330,101		

=== Portuguese ===
Global spread of Portuguese: Native language and official Official and administrative language

Country	Region	Population	More information
Brazil	South America	217,637,297	Brazilian Portuguese
Mozambique	Africa	21,669,278	Mozambican Portuguese
Angola	Africa	18,498,000	Angolan Portuguese
Portugal	Europe	10,318,000	European Portuguese
Equatorial Guinea	Africa	1,795,834	
East Timor	Asia	1,245,000	East Timorese Portuguese
Guinea-Bissau	Africa	1,110,000	Guinean Portuguese
Macau	Asia	641,000	Macanese Portuguese
Cape Verde	Africa	499,000	Cape Verdean Portuguese
Sao Tome and Principe	Africa	212,679	Sao Tomean Portuguese
Total		273,626,088	

=== Turkish ===
Country	Region	Population	Status
Turkey	Eurasia	86,092,168	Official language
Cyprus	Asia	1,320,525	Co-official language with Greek
Total		87,412,693	

== See also ==
- List of official languages by country and territory
- De facto

By ISO 639-3 code
Enter an ISO code to find the corresponding language article.
