= Upper Guinea Creole =

The Upper Guinea Creoles are Portuguese-based creole languages, based in West Africa and the Caribbean, that have Portuguese as their substantial lexifier.

It includes the languages:

- Cape Verdean Creole, spoken in Cape Verde.
- Guinea-Bissau Creole, spoken in Guinea-Bissau, and Casamance, Senegal.
- Papiamento, spoken in Aruba, Bonaire, and Curaçao.
