= Guinean Portuguese =

Variety of Portuguese language

- português guineense, português da Guiné
- Native to: Guinea-Bissau
- Native speakers: 290,000 (2015)
- Language family: Indo-European: Italic; Latin; Romance; Western Romance; Ibero-Romance; West-Iberian; Galician-Portuguese; Portuguese; Guinean Portuguese

Official status
- Regulated by: Academia de Letras e Artes da Guiné-Bissau

Language codes
- ISO 639-3: –
- Glottolog: None
- IETF: pt-GW

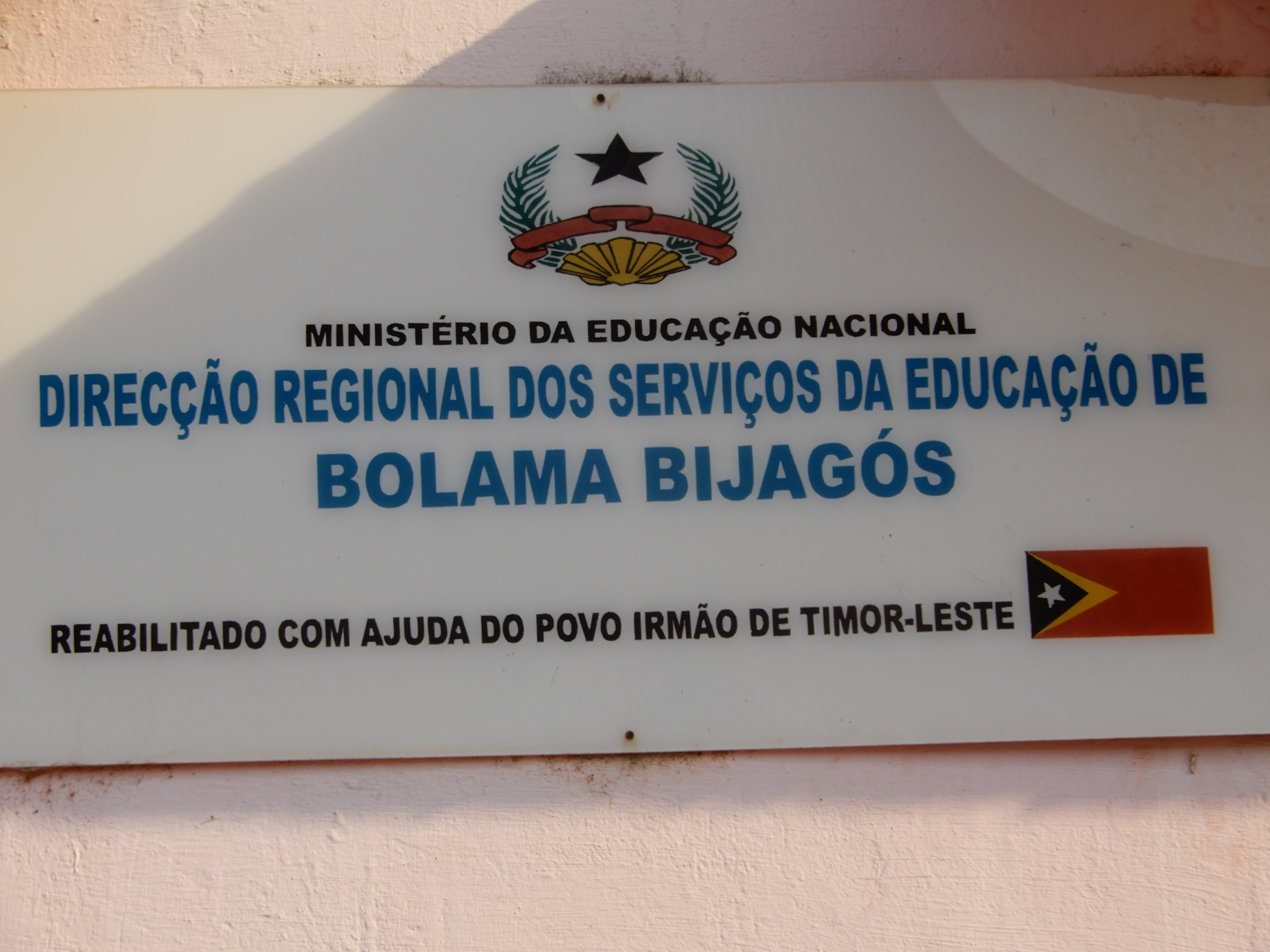
A sign at the local Department of Education and Training of Bolama, which was rehabilitated with the cooperation from the Government of Timor-Leste

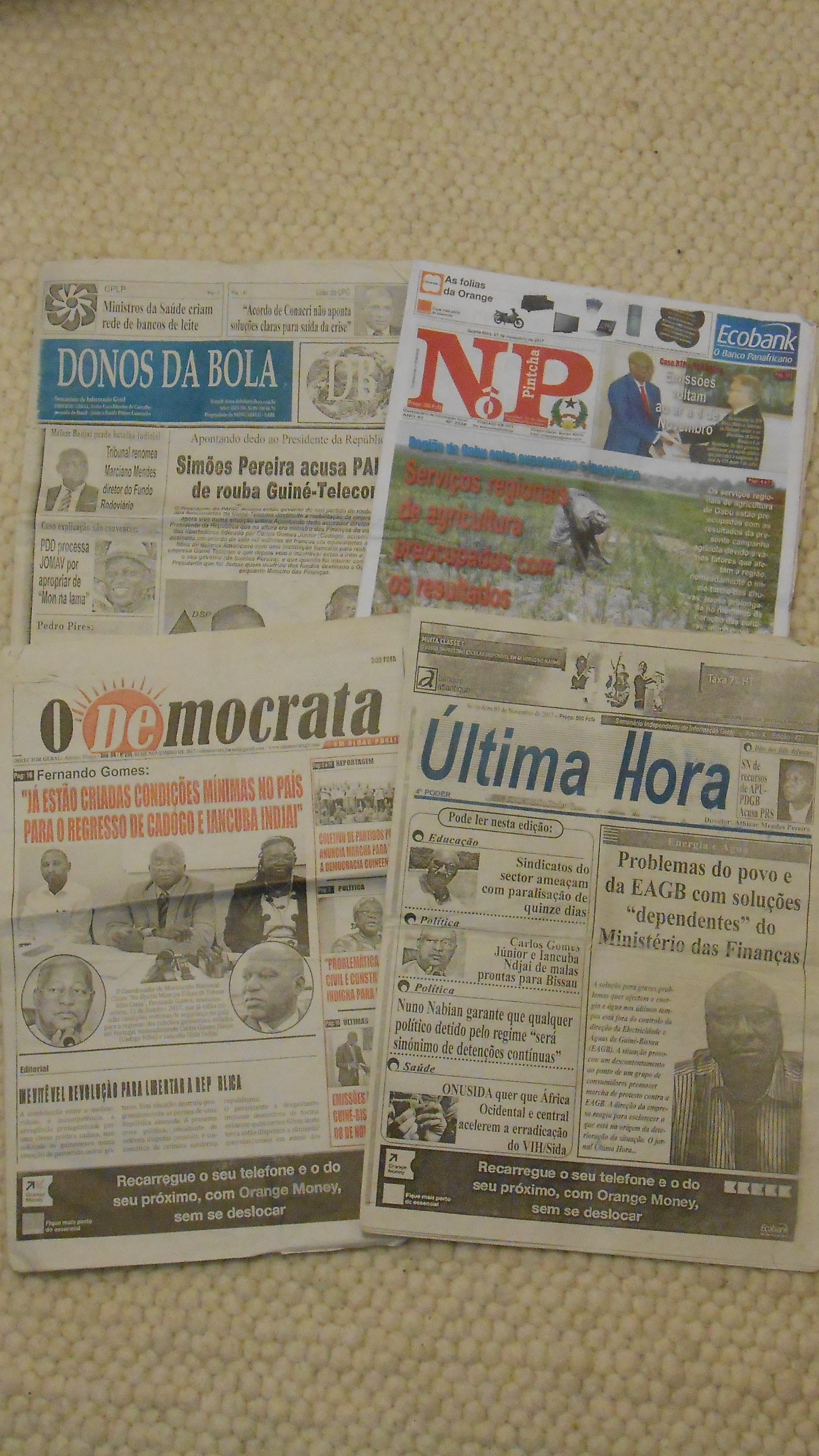
Newspapers of Guinea-Bissau (2017)

Guinean Portuguese (Portuguese: Português Guineense) is the variety of Portuguese spoken in Guinea-Bissau, where it is the official language.

== Prevalence ==
Guinea-Bissau is unique among the African member states of the Community of Portuguese Language Countries (CPLP) in that it is both highly diverse linguistically, like Angola and Mozambique, and it is also a creole society, like Cape Verde and São Tomé e Príncipe.

Rather than Portuguese, it is Guinea-Bissau Creole which serves as the lingua franca and the vehicle of national identity spoken as both a first and second language. Guinea-Bissau Creole is the dominant language of trade, informal literature and entertainment; Standard Portuguese is the official language of the country, which is exclusively used in news media, parliament, public services and educational programming. Thus Portuguese, for those who speak it, is often a third language. Also, code switching occurs between the Creole and standard Portuguese and/or native African languages in informal speech. The native Portuguese speakers in Guinea-Bissau are mostly white Guineans. The population of native Portuguese speakers has been reduced by the emigration of most white Guineans to Portugal or Brazil, and by the civil war which negatively affected the education system. The majority of the approximately 15% of Guineans who speak Portuguese are concentrated in an area of the capital city, Bissau, known as 'a Praça'. The variety of Guinea Bissau Creole spoken in the capital, Kriol di Bissau, is known for being more Lusitanized, borrowing words more freely from Portuguese.

The standard phonology is European Portuguese. But for second- and third-language speakers, it is affected by phonologies of native languages and resembles Indian Portuguese.

== History ==
Portuguese was used as a communication between Portuguese settlers and different black tribes (most are Fulas, Mandingos, Manjacos, and Balante) before the nation became a permanent Portuguese overseas territory. The number of Portuguese speakers was large during Portuguese rule, although mestiços and most blacks speak a Portuguese Creole called Guinea-Bissau Creole, which is a more widely spoken lingua franca of the nation. After independence, when most Portuguese left, Portuguese speakers were reduced to less than 10% because of civil war that affected education, although it remained the official language of the country.

== Language Planning ==
When the CPLP was founded in 1996, it helped Guinea-Bissau in education aside from peace talks there. Many Portuguese, Brazilian, and PALOP (mostly Angolan) teachers entered to increase Portuguese fluency among Bissau-Guineans. In 2005, in order to increase Portuguese fluency, there was an agreement between Guinean officials and Instituto Camões, which already had a center in Bissau, to open centers in other towns of the country: Canchungo, Ongoré, Mansôa, Bafatá, Gabú, Buba, Catió, Bolama, Bubaque, and Quinhamel. The percentage of Portuguese speakers increased to 14%.

== See also ==
- Guinea-Bissau Creole
- RTP África
- Mozambican Portuguese
- ECOWAS
