= List of countries and territories where Romanian is an official language =

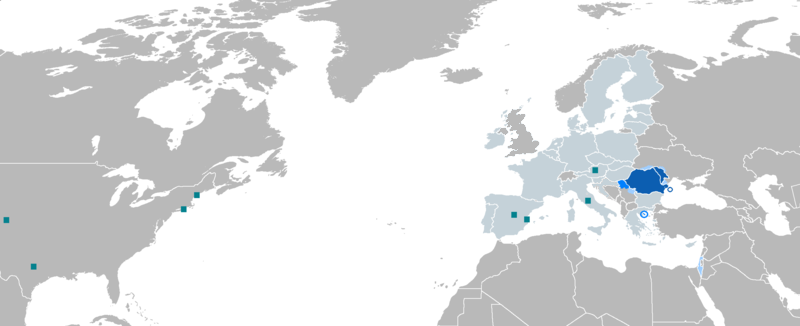
Map of the Roumanophone World (sensitive map) Single official language and language of the majority Official language but spoken by a minority European Union Romanian diaspora

This is a list of countries and territories and organisations where Romanian is an official language:

== Countries where Romanian is an official language ==
Country	Population	Native Romanian speakers	Est. total speakers	Status of Romanian	More info
Moldova	3,461,380 (2014)	80.5%^{1}	2,560,000	Declaration of Independence of the Republic of Moldova	Languages of Moldova
Romania	21,640,168 (2014)	90.7%	19,900,000	Constitution of Romania, art. 13	Languages of Romania

^{1}Excludes Transnistria

== Regions where Romanian is an official language ==
Region	Country	Status	Population	Native Romanian speakers	Status of Romanian	More info
Gagauzia	Moldova	Autonomous region	155,646 (2004)	3.9%	Statute of Gagauzia, art. 3§1	
Transnistria	Moldova	De facto independent	555,347 (2004)	32.1%	Statute of the Settlements from the Left Bank (Transnistria), art. 6§1 (Latin); Constitution of Transnistria, art. 12 (Cyrillic)	Languages of Transnistria
Vojvodina	Serbia	Autonomous region	1,931,809 (2011)	1.45%	Statute of the Autonomous Province of Vojvodina, art. 26	Romanian language in Serbia

Romanian has been declared a "regional language" alongside Ukrainian in Hertsa Raion of Ukraine as well as in other villages of Chernivtsi and Zakarpattia oblasts, as per the 2012 legislation on languages in Ukraine.

== Organisations with Romanian as an official language ==
Organisation	Members	Status of Romanian	More info
European Union	Romania and other 26 states	Regulation No. 1 of the EC	Languages of the European Union
Latin Union	Moldova, Romania and other 34 states	Convention of Madrid, 1954	Romance languages
Monastic community of Mount Athos	Romanian Orthodox Church and other Eastern Rite churches	Language of religious service	

== Countries where Romanian is taught in schools ==
- (Belgium) Romanian is taught in 13 schools in the Belgian cities of: Brussels, Liège and Mons.
- (Republic of Ireland) Romanian is taught in two schools in the Irish capital Dublin.
- (Italy) Romanian is taught in 228 schools in the Italian regions of: Abruzzo, Apulia, Emilia-Romagna, Campania, Friuli-Venezia Giulia, Lazio, Lombardy, Marche, Molise, Piedmont, Sardinia, Sicily, Trento, Tuscany, Umbria and Veneto.
- (Portugal) Romanian is taught in five schools in the Portuguese cities of: Lisbon, Loulé and Setúbal.
- (Spain) Romanian is taught in 328 schools in the Spanish communities of: Andalusia, Aragon, Asturias, Basque Country, Canary Islands, Cantabria, Castile and León, Castilla-La Mancha, Catalonia, La Rioja, Madrid, Murcia, Navarre and Valencia.
- In parts of Ukraine where Romanians constitute a significant share of the local population (districts in Chernivtsi, Odesa and Zakarpattia oblasts) Romanian is taught in schools as a primary language and there are Romanian-language newspapers, TV, and radio broadcasting. The University of Chernivtsi trains teachers for Romanian schools in the fields of Romanian philology, mathematics and physics.

== See also ==
- Language geography
- Geolinguistics

By ISO 639-3 code
Enter an ISO code to find the corresponding language article.
