= Portuguese-speaking African countries =

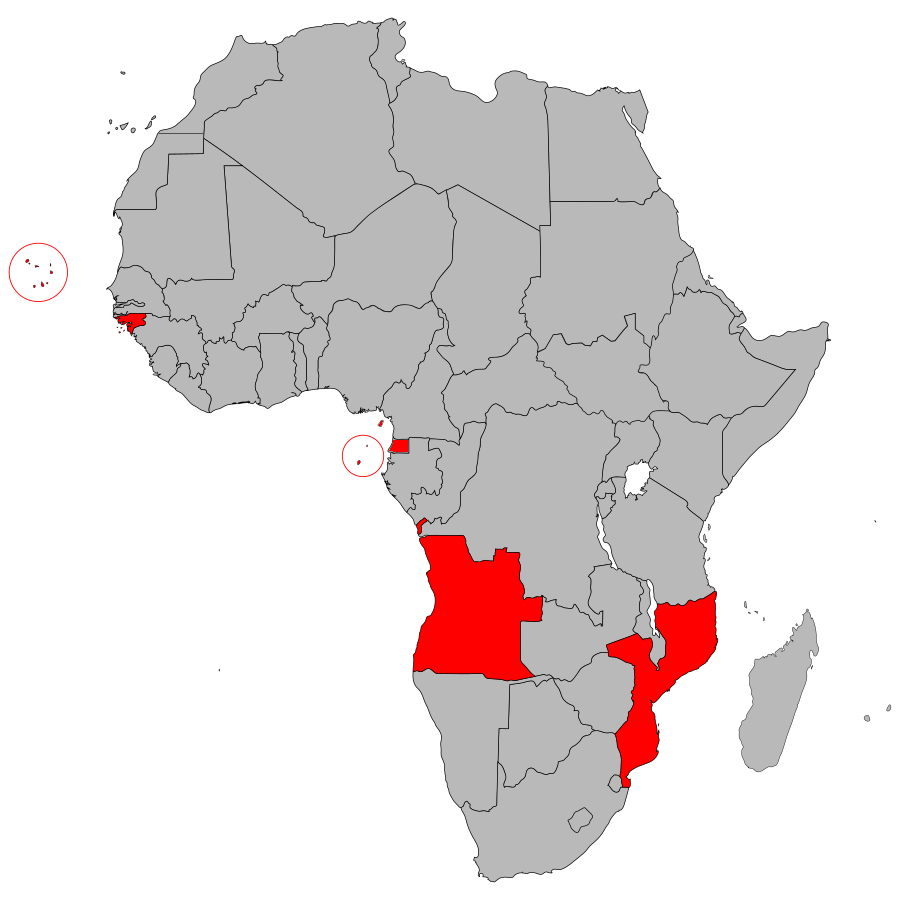
The PALOP, highlighted in red

The Portuguese-speaking African countries (Portuguese: Países Africanos de Língua Oficial Portuguesa; PALOP), also known as Lusophone Africa, consist of six African countries in which the Portuguese language is an official language: Angola, Cape Verde, Guinea-Bissau, Mozambique, São Tomé and Príncipe and, since 2011, Equatorial Guinea. The six countries are former colonies of the Portuguese Empire. From 1778 until independence, Equatorial Guinea was also a colony of the Spanish Empire.

In 1992, the five Lusophone African countries formed an interstate organisation called PALOP, a colloquial acronym that translates to "African Countries of Portuguese Official Language" (Portuguese: Países Africanos de Língua Oficial Portuguesa). The PALOP countries have signed official agreements with Portugal, the European Union and the United Nations, and they work together to promote the development of culture, education and the preservation of the Portuguese language.

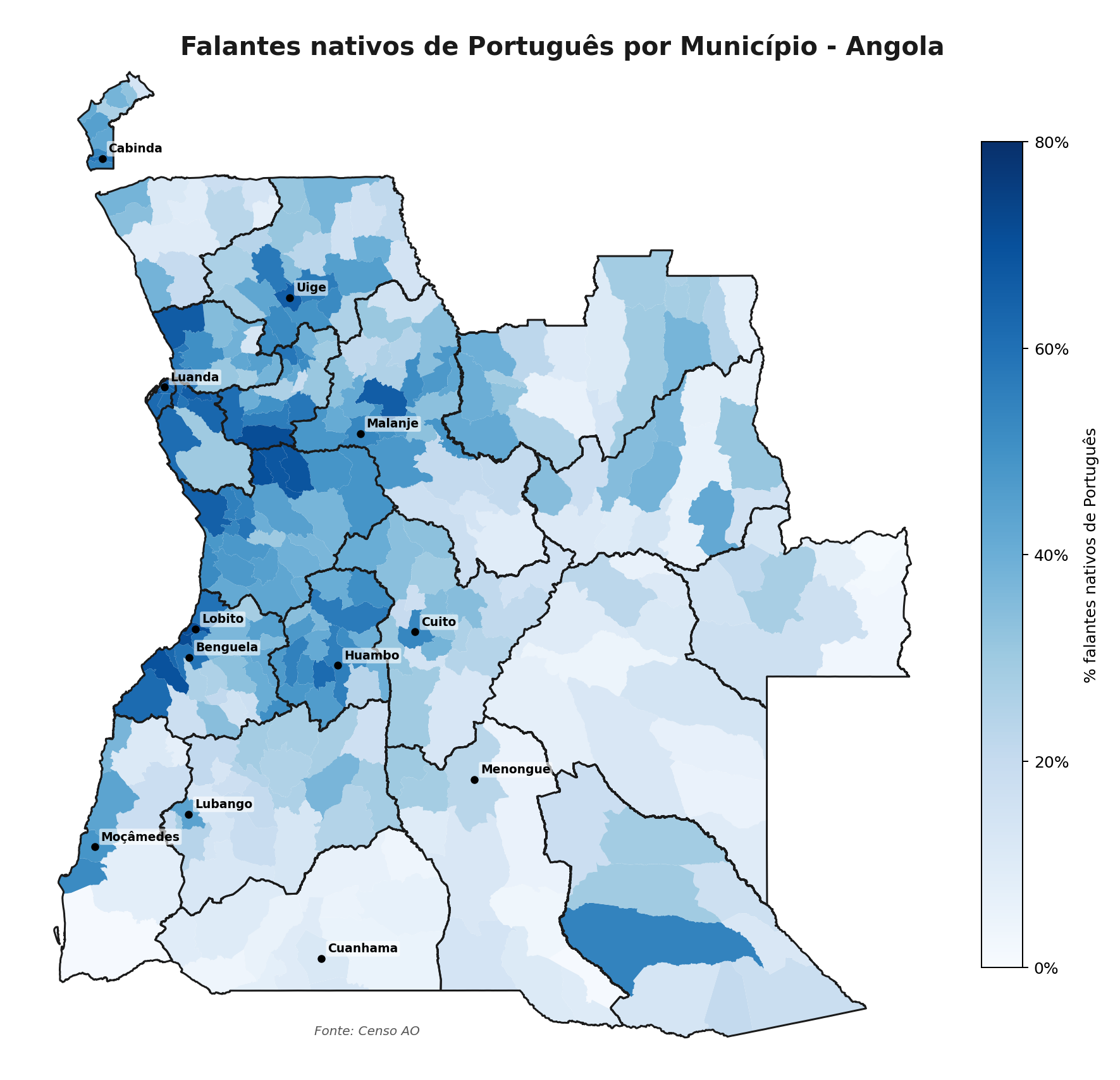
English: Map of Angola – percentage of native speakers in each municipality.

In 1996, together with Portugal and Brazil, the Portuguese-speaking African countries established the Community of Portuguese Language Countries (Portuguese: Comunidade dos Países de Língua Portuguesa, abbreviated to CPLP), which East Timor later joined in 2002 and Equatorial Guinea in 2014.

In 2016, it was projected that by the end of the 21st century, Africa would be home to the majority of Portuguese speakers worldwide.

== The PALOP countries ==
=== Former Portuguese colonies ===
- Angola
- Cape Verde
- Guinea-Bissau
- Mozambique
- São Tomé and Príncipe

=== Portuguese colony (1474–1778), Spanish colony (1778–1968) ===
- Equatorial Guinea

Equatorial Guinea adopted Portuguese as its third official language in October 2011. Originally a Portuguese colony before it was sold to Spain in 1778 as part of peace arrangements involving also the colony of Sacramento in the Southern Cone of the Americas, Equatorial Guinea has adopted Portuguese as the country's third official language in order to be allowed into the CPLP, despite its limited historical and cultural commonalities with the other countries.

Equatorial Guinea was traditionally not considered part of the PALOP, and it was not a founding member of FORPALOP in June 2014, a recently created institution that includes the PALOP, a forum for political-diplomatic cooperation to deepen historical friendship ties and solidarity between these African states. Portuguese is sparsely used throughout the country. However, it was admitted into the CPLP in 2014, and it subsequently became FORPALOP's sixth member.

== Demographics ==
=== Countries ===
Country	Population	Area (km^{2})	GDP (nominal) per capita	Percentage of Lusophones
Angola	35,678,572	1.247.000	1.953,53	71%
Cape Verde	587,925	4.033	3.293,23	87%
Equatorial Guinea	1,468,777	28.050	14.637,01	Unknown
Guinea-Bissau	2,095,887	36.126	795,12	57%
Mozambique	20,069,738	801.590	466,557	60%
São Tomé and Príncipe	204,454	963.5	526,7	91%
Total	60,105,353	2,117,762	1,734,82	

== Shared postcolonial legacy ==
These five African countries are former colonies of the Portuguese Empire, which collapsed shortly after the Carnation Revolution military coup of 1974 in Lisbon. The strains of the Portuguese Colonial War overextended and weakened the Portuguese dictatorship and precipitated the overthrow of António de Oliveira Salazar's regime. Younger military officers, who were disillusioned by a war that was far-off and taxing, began to side with the pro-independence resistance against Portugal and eventually led to the military coup d'état on April 25, 1974.

The long-lasting rule of the Portuguese colonial empire had varying effects on the African states even after they gained independence in the 1970s. The legacy of Portuguese empire-building pervades the postcolonial discourse that attempts to explain the development of the modern nation state in Lusophone Africa and shed light on its failures.

== The Lusophone Compact ==
The Lusophone Compact is an initiative championed by the African Development Bank to accelerate inclusive, sustainable, and diversified private sector growth in the Portuguese-speaking African countries. The primary objectives of the Lusophone Compact activities are to deploy technical assistance tools and programs, leverage the risk mitigation tools available to the parties and leverage the financing tools available to the parties.

== See also ==
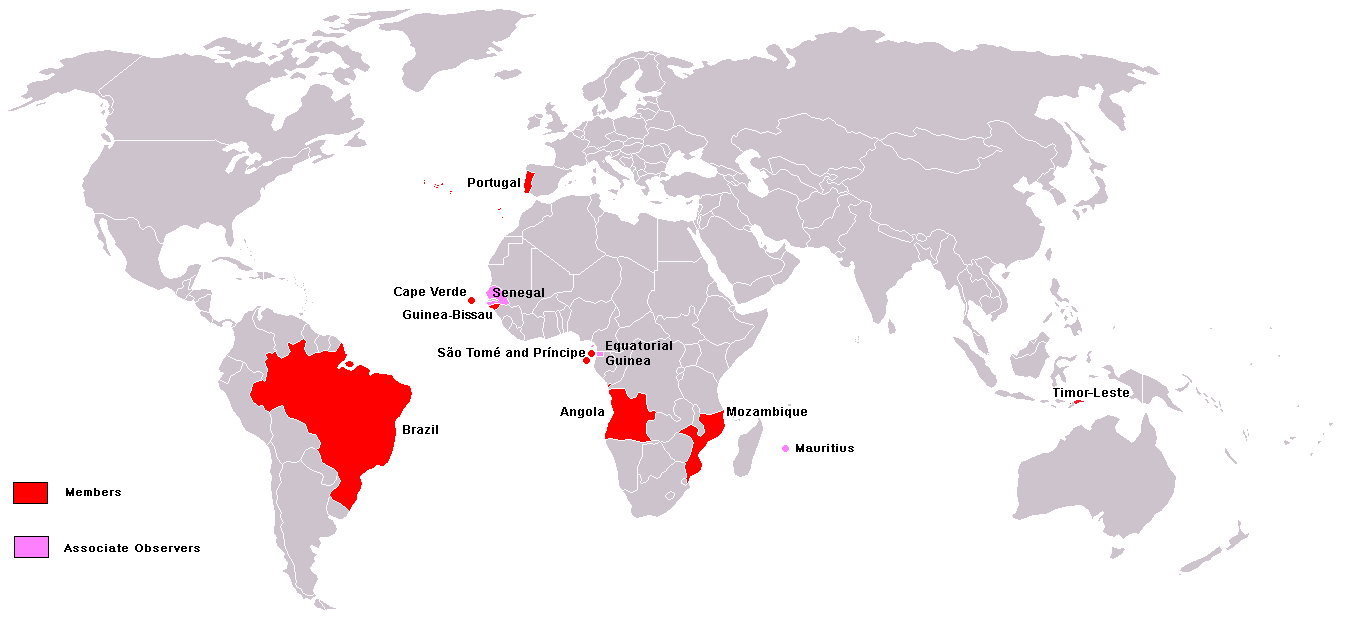
Members of the Community of Portuguese Language Countries (CPLP)

- Community of Portuguese Language Countries
- Geographic distribution of Portuguese
- Portuguese in Africa
- Lusophony (List of countries where Portuguese is an official language)

By ISO 639-3 code
Enter an ISO code to find the corresponding language article.
