= List of countries and territories where French is an official language =

Countries with French as an official language: Only official language (Note: Benin, Côte d'Ivoire, Democratic Republic of the Congo, France, Gabon, Guinea, Monaco, Republic of the Congo, Senegal, Togo) Co-official language (Note: Belgium, Burundi, Cameroon, Canada, Central African Republic, Chad, Comoros, Djibouti, Equatorial Guinea, Haiti, Luxembourg, Madagascar, Rwanda, Seychelles, Switzerland, Vanuatu)

French is an official de jure language in 26 independent nations and 10 subnational territories, making it one of the most geographically widespread languages after English and tied with Arabic. Overall, it is also used as a de jure or de facto official, secondary, or cultural language in about 50 states and territories. It is the 22nd most natively spoken language in the world, and the 6th most spoken by total number of speakers; this disparity reflects the fact that in most countries French serves primarily as a lingua franca or administrative language rather than as a native tongue, which is widespread in only five countries and territories. (Note: French is spoken as a mother tongue by the majority of the population, in descending order, in France, Canada (Quebec), Belgium (Wallonia and the Brussels-Capital Region), western Switzerland (Romandy) and Monaco.) The following is a list of sovereign states and territories where French is an official language.

== Sole official language ==
=== Countries ===
List of countries where French is the only official language:

Country	Continent	Capital
Benin	Africa	Porto-novo
Congo, Democratic Republic of	Africa	Kinshasa
Congo, Republic of	Africa	Brazzaville
France and Overseas France	Europe, Africa, Oceania, the Americas	Paris
Gabon	Africa	Libreville
Guinea	Africa	Conakry
Ivory Coast	Africa	Yamoussoukro (Abidjan remains a strong political alliance, one of the biggest towns, and was the capital until 1983 )
Monaco	Europe	Monaco
Senegal	Africa	Dakar
Togo	Africa	Lome

=== Non-sovereign entities ===
Region	Country
Quebec	Canada
French Community	Belgium
Geneva	Switzerland
Jura	Switzerland
Neuchâtel	Switzerland
Vaud	Switzerland

== Co-official use ==
=== Sovereign states ===
In many countries, French is used as a co-official language alongside one or more other languages. List of countries where French is a co-official language:

Country	Alongside
Belgium	Dutch, German
Burundi	Kirundi, English
Cameroon	English
Canada	English
Central African Republic	Sango
Chad	Arabic
Comoros	Comorian, Arabic
Djibouti	Arabic
Equatorial Guinea	Spanish, Portuguese
Haiti	Haitian Creole
Luxembourg	Luxembourgish, German
Madagascar	Malagasy
Rwanda	Kinyarwanda, English, Swahili
Seychelles	English, Seychellois Creole
Switzerland	German, Italian, Romansh
Vanuatu	Bislama, English

=== National subdivisions ===
Region	Country	Alongside
Aosta Valley, Aosta	Italy	Italian
Brussels	Belgium	Dutch
Wallonia	Belgium	German
Bern	Switzerland	German
Fribourg	Switzerland	German
Valais	Switzerland	German
New Brunswick	Canada	English
Yukon	Canada	English
Northwest Territories	Canada	English and several indigenous languages
Nunavut	Canada	Inuktitut, Inuinnaqtun, English
Puducherry	India	Tamil, Malayalam, Telugu, English
Sark	United Kingdom	English

== Officially recognized status ==
Although a non-official minority language, French is granted certain rights in the following countries and territories:

- Lebanon
- Louisiana (United States)
- Maine (United States)
- Mauritius

== Intergovernmental organizations ==
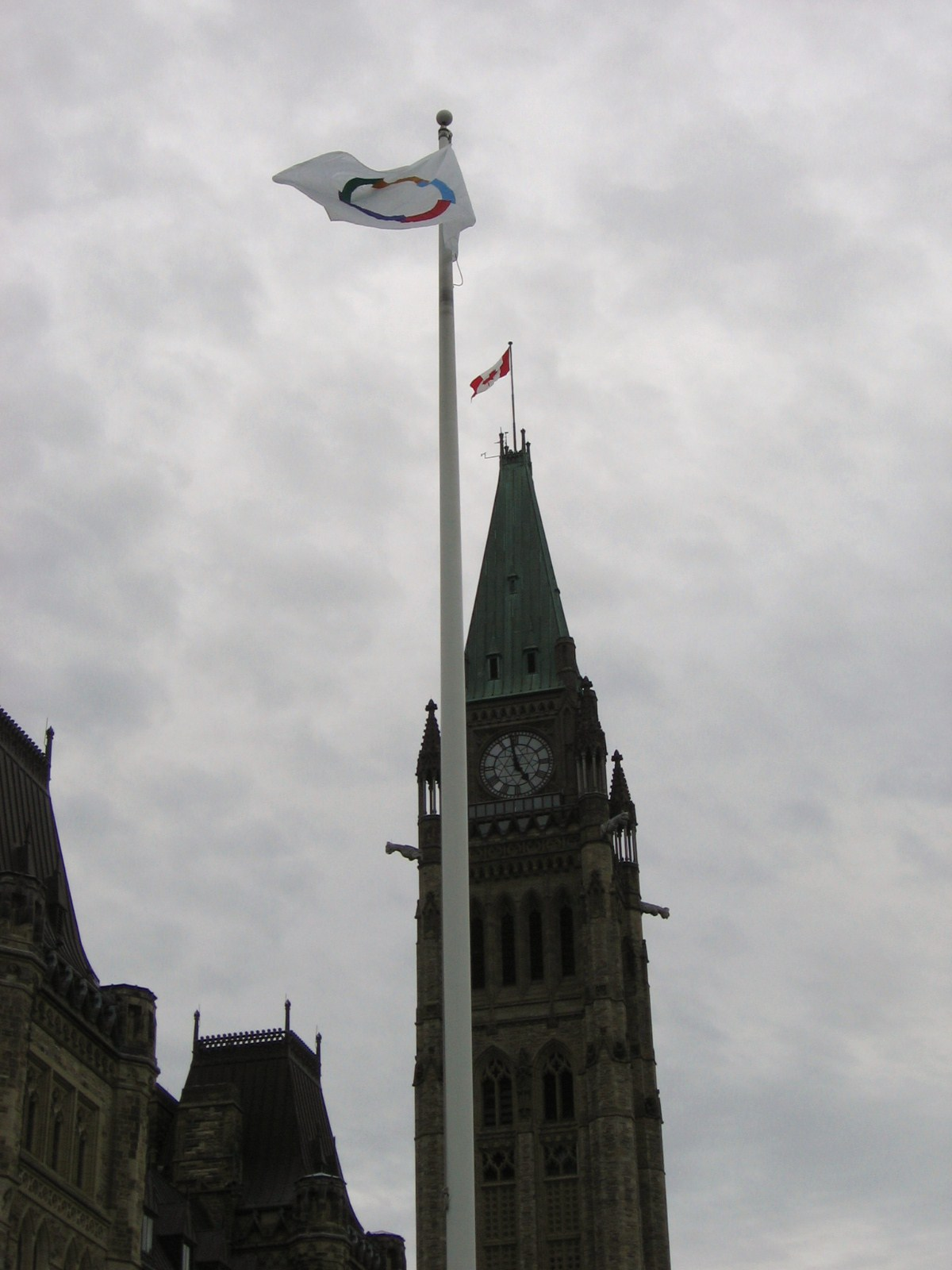
The Francophonie flag flying at the Parliament of Canada in Ottawa

French is an official language, mostly in conjunction with English, of 36 international organizations. These include:

- African Union
- Council of Europe
- European Union
- International Olympic Committee
- NATO
- Organisation for Economic Co-operation and Development
- Organisation internationale de la Francophonie
- United Nations
- World Trade Organization

== Countries ==
This table shows the total populations of the countries, not the number of French speakers – most of these countries have a majority that do not speak French.

No.	Country	Continent	Population
1.	Democratic Republic of the Congo	Africa	115,403,027
2.	France	Europe	68,374,591
3.	Canada	North America	38,794,813
4	Cameroon	Africa	30,966,105
5.	Côte d'Ivoire	Africa	29,981,758
6.	Madagascar	Africa	29,452,714
7.	Chad	Africa	19,093,595
8.	Senegal	Africa	18,847,519
9.	Benin	Africa	14,697,052
10.	Guinea	Africa	13,986,179
11.	Rwanda	Africa	13,623,302
12.	Burundi	Africa	13,590,102
13.	Belgium	Europe	11,977,634
14.	Haiti	North America	11,753,943
15.	Togo	Africa	8,917,994
16.	Switzerland	Europe	8,860,574
17.	Republic of the Congo	Africa	6,097,665
18.	Central African Republic	Africa	5,650,957
19.	Gabon	Africa	2,455,105
20.	Equatorial Guinea	Africa	1,795,834
21.	Djibouti	Africa	994,974
22.	Comoros	Africa	900,141
23.	Luxembourg	Europe	671,254
24.	Vanuatu	Oceania	318,007
25.	Seychelles	Africa	98,187
26.	Monaco	Europe	31,813
Total	All countries	World	c. 467,334,839

== Dependent entities ==
Nr.	Entity	Continent	Population	Status
1.	New Caledonia	Oceania	304,167	Collectivity of France with special status
2.	French Polynesia	Oceania	303,540	Overseas collectivity of France
3.	Saint Martin	North America	32,996	Overseas collectivity of France
4.	Wallis and Futuna	Oceania	15,964	Overseas collectivity of France
5.	Saint Barthélemy	North America	10,660	Overseas collectivity of France
6.	Saint Pierre and Miquelon	North America	5,819	Overseas collectivity of France
7.	French Southern and Antarctic Lands	Africa, Antarctica	400	Overseas collectivity of France
8.	Clipperton Island	North America	0	Overseas collectivity of France

Note: Réunion, Guadeloupe, Martinique, French Guiana and Mayotte are classified as overseas departments and regions of France and are thus not a part of this list. While not de jure official, the U.S. states of Louisiana and Maine recognize the usage of French in law, governance, and commerce and allow state services and publicly funded education in the language, rendering it de facto official alongside English.

== Non-official but significant language ==
While French is not an official language in these countries, it is widely used in administration and many professional sectors, as well as being highly influential as a cultural language in the local society and has certain privileges in the education system.

Country	Continent	Population (2023)	Usage of French
Algeria	Africa	44,758,398	Administrative, commercial, cultural, educational, de facto official language
Burkina Faso	Africa	22,489,126	Administrative, commercial, educational
Cambodia	Asia	16,891,245	Administrative (particularly judicial and diplomacy), cultural, some educational
Laos	Asia	7,852,377	Administrative, commercial, cultural, educational
Lebanon	Asia	5,331,203	De jure second language
Mali	Africa	21,359,722	Administrative, commercial, educational
Mauritania	Africa	4,244,878	De facto second official language, educational
Mauritius	Africa	1,309,448	Administrative (de facto official), cultural, educational
Morocco	Africa	37,067,420	Administrative, commercial, cultural, educational, de facto official language
Niger	Africa	26,342,784	Administrative, commercial, educational
Tunisia	Africa	11,976,182	Administrative, commercial, cultural, educational, de facto official language
Vietnam	Asia	99,460,000	Administrative (diplomatic), cultural, some educational, working language in medicine, science, and law

== See also ==
- Francophonie
- Geographical distribution of French speakers
- List of international organisations which have French as an official language
- French-based creole languages
- Geolinguistics
- Language geography

== Notes ==
By ISO 639-3 code
Enter an ISO code to find the corresponding language article.
