= Official languages of the United Nations =

There are six official languages used in United Nations (UN) meetings and in which the UN writes and publishes all its official documents. In 1946, five languages were chosen as official languages of the UN: English, French, Russian, Spanish, and Chinese. In 1971, the United Nations' use of Traditional Chinese characters was replaced with Simplified Chinese characters. In 1973, Arabic was voted to be an additional official language. As of 2026, the official languages of the United Nations are:

- English (British English with Oxford spelling), in English Latin alphabet;
- French (Metropolitan French – français métropolitain / langues d'oïl) in French Latin alphabet;
- Spanish (Peninsular Spanish – español peninsular / castellano) in Spanish Latin alphabet;
- Russian (Moscow Russian – московское произношение, moskovskoye proiznosheniye) in the Russian Cyrillic alphabet;
- Chinese (Standard Mandarin – 中文, zhōngwén / 普通话, pǔtōnghuà) in Simplified Chinese characters;
- Arabic (Modern Standard Arabic – العربيّة الفصحى, al-ʿarabiyyah al-fuṣḥá) in Naskh / Arabic abjad.

According to the UN Charter each of these six languages is equally authoritative although English and French have traditionally received preferential status and are the only two official and working languages of the UN Secretariat. It is an unspoken rule that the UN Secretary General and other high ranking United Nations officials must be fluent (at least C1 – Advanced fluency level according to the Common European Framework of Reference for Languages / CEFRL) in at least English and French. The UN has struggled to provide parity of all 6 languages as the English language has become the dominant world language in the digital age.

Multiple UN Secretaries General, including Kofi Annan, Ban Ki Moon and Antonio Guterres, have worked to improve multilingualism within the UN. This work has culminated in additional funding for the UN Translation Service, the creation of the Coordinator for Multilingualism role, UN Language Days, and starting in 2018, the UN News website providing translations into non-official languages such as Portuguese, Swahili, Hindi, and Urdu in addition to the official languages. These and many of the non-official languages used by the United Nations often represent the Global South. Rule 57 allows the General Assembly or any subcommittee to utilize any language other than the languages of the Assembly. As of 2025, the United Nations and UNESCO have not formally ratified the Universal Declaration of Linguistic Rights.

== Description ==
These languages are used at meetings of various UN organs, particularly the General Assembly (Article 51 of its Rules of Procedure), the Economic and Social Council and the Security Council (Article 41 of its Rules of Procedure). Each representative of a country may speak in any one of these six languages or may speak in any language and provide interpretation into one of the six official languages. The UN provides simultaneous interpretation from any official language into the other five official languages, via the United Nations Interpretation Service.

The six official languages are also used for the dissemination of official documents. Generally, the texts in each of the six languages are equally authoritative.

=== Working languages ===
Most UN councils use all six languages as official and working languages. However, as of 2023 the United Nations Secretariat uses only two working languages: English and French, which are also the two official working languages of the International Court of Justice.

Initially, only English and French were working languages, and the Rules of Procedure stated that speeches in official languages (working or non-working) were to be interpreted only into the working languages. If a country wanted to give a speech in a non-official language and provide an interpretation, the interpretation had to be in a working language. Meeting transcriptions were to be provided in the working languages, with translations into official non-working languages available upon request. Resolutions and meeting summaries were to be provided in all of the official languages. This distinction continued as more official languages became working languages. The distinction was removed after all official languages became working languages.

== Official languages of the United Nations, Ethnologue, 2026 ==
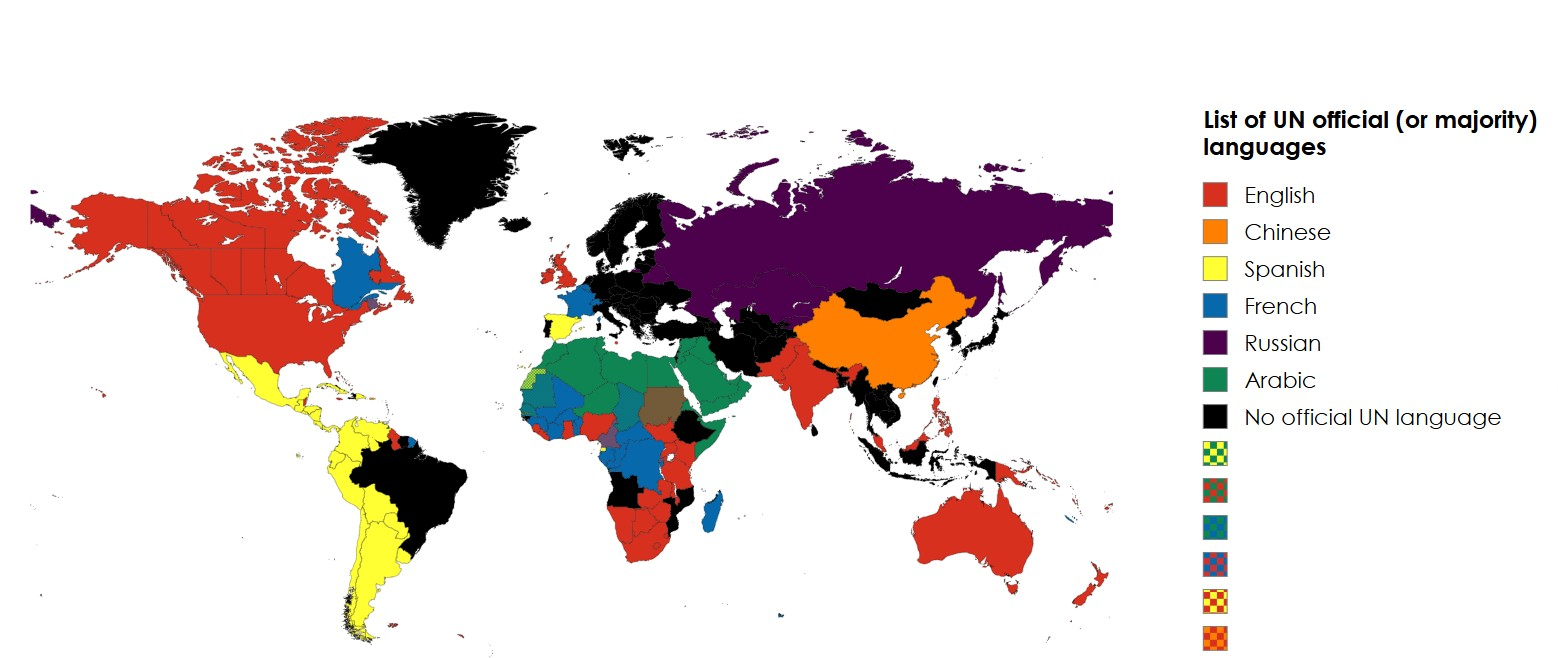

UN official language facts (speakers are in millions).

Prose	L1/L2	Sum	Nations	UN (General Assembly/Secretariat)	Regulating method	Branch	Glottolog/Linguasphere
English (eng)	390/1138	1528	90	OW/OW	British English/NA	Germanic	stan1293/52-ABA
French (fra)	74/238	312	50	OW/OW	Metropolitan French/Académie Française	Romance	stan1290/51-AAA
Spanish (spa)	498/74	572	22	OW/O	(Spanish / Castilian)/Royal Spanish Academy	Romance	stan1288/51-AAA-b
Russian (rus)	145/65	210	5	OW/O	Central Russian/Russian Language Institute	Slavic	russ1263/53-AAA-e
Arabic dialects (ara)	20/335	355	23	OW/O	Modern Standard Arabic/Academy of the Arabic Language	Semitic	(stan1318/arab1395)/12-AAC
Chinese (cnm)	990/194	1184	3	OW/O	Mandarin Chinese/Ministry of Education	Sinitic	mand1415/79-AAA-b

== History ==
In 1920, the League of Nations was one of the first international institutions to promote the concept of international official languages to foster communication and spur global diplomacy in the aftermath of the brutality of World War I. The League of Nations selected English, French, and Spanish as official languages with English and French being the working languages. English and French were chosen due to the global reach of the British Empire and the French Empire. Spanish was selected due to the large number of first-language speakers in Hispanic America and the former Spanish Empire. There was an effort to select Esperanto as an additional language of the League, but that was rejected.

In the 1940s, as the conclusion of World War II was nearing, the Allies held a multitude of conferences, including the London Declaration, the Arcadia Conference, the Cairo Conference, the Tehran Conference, the Yalta Conference and the Potsdam Conference. These conferences were meant to coordinate and plan the post-war world, including how to promote world peace in the aftermath of the war, how to facilitate global communication through an international auxiliary language (such as Esperanto) or an existing group of languages, and how to handle the decolonization of Africa and Asia. Additionally, these conferences led to the establishment of the United Nations as the successor of the League of Nations.

In 1945, this culminated in the Charter of the UN, its constituent document signed at the San Francisco Conference, which did not expressly provide for official languages. The Charter was initially enacted in five languages (English, French, Mandarin, Russian, and Spanish). The United Nations selected these original five languages because in addition to being utilized by the League of Nations, they were also the de facto official languages of the major Allied nations, including the Big Four: the British Empire, the United States, the Soviet Union and the Republic of China plus French which was the language of France and the French colonies. These nations: the UK, the US, the USSR, Republic of China, and France, became the five Permanent Members of the UN Security Council. Unofficially, the UN held its operations in English and French; however, the Charter provided (in Article 111) that the five languages be equally authoritative.

On 1 February 1946, the first session of the United Nations General Assembly adopted rules of procedure concerning languages that purported to apply to "all the organs of the United Nations, other than the International Court of Justice", formally setting out five (5) official languages and two (2) working languages (English and French). On 24 June 1946, the Security Council formally also set the five official languages and two working languages.

The following year, the second session of the General Assembly adopted permanent rules of procedure, Resolution 173 (II). The part of those rules relating to language closely followed the 1946 rules, except that the 1947 rules did not purport to apply to other UN organs, just the General Assembly. Meanwhile, a proposal had been in the works to add Spanish as a third working language in addition to English and French.

On 11 December 1948, the General Assembly added Spanish as a working language.

On 21 December 1968, the General Assembly added Russian as a working language.

On 22 January 1969, the Security Council added Spanish and Russian as working languages.

In October 1971, the Republic of China (Taiwan) was expelled and replaced with the People's Republic of China. The ROC uses Traditional Chinese characters while the PRC (on the mainland) uses Simplified Chinese characters; the United Nations consequently switched from Traditional Chinese to Simplified Chinese around the end of 1971. The last General Assembly resolution of the 1971 session (resolution number 2903, adopted 22 December 1971, transcribed 1972) is written in Traditional Chinese, while the first General Assembly resolution of the 1972 session (resolution number 2904, adopted 26 September 1972, transcribed 1973) is written in Simplified Chinese. Conversely, as full meeting records presumably take longer to transcribe, the General Assembly meeting record of (for example) 24 September 1968 was not transcribed until 1971 (Note: The United Nations Digital Library does not list a specific month or day for this transcription.) and is written in Simplified Chinese.)

On 18 December 1973, the General Assembly made Mandarin a working language. They also added Arabic as both an official language and working language of the GA. Thus all six official languages were also working languages. Arabic was made an official and working language of "the General Assembly and its Main Committees", whereas the other five languages had status in all GA committees and subcommittees (not just the main committees). The Arab members of the UN had agreed to pay the costs of implementing the resolution, for three years. On 17 December 1980, the General Assembly removed this final distinction, making Arabic an official and working language of all its committees and subcommittees, as of 1 January 1982. At the same time, the GA requested the Security Council to include Arabic among its official and working languages, and the Economic and Social Council to include Arabic among its official languages, by 1 January 1983.

On 17 January 1974, the Security Council added Chinese as a working language.

On 21 December 1982, the Security Council added Arabic as an official and working language.

In the Economic and Social Council, as of 1992, there were six official languages (Arabic, English, French, Mandarin, Russian and Spanish) of which three were working languages (English, French, and Spanish). Arabic was added as an official language on 15 April 1982. Later, Arabic, Mandarin, and Russian were added as working languages in the Economic and Social Council.

In 2001, the United Nations drew criticism for relying too heavily on English, and not enough on the other five official languages and Spanish-speaking member nations formally brought this to the attention of the secretary-general. Additionally, there was a movement to consider adding official languages or creating a grouping of semi-official languages for languages with over 50 million speakers. This did not happen. Secretary General Kofi Annan responded to these criticisms that full parity of the six official languages was unachievable within current budgetary restraints, but he nevertheless attached great importance to improving the linguistic balance and worked to increase parity between the existing 6 official languages.

On 8 June 2007, resolutions concerning human resources management at the UN, the General Assembly had emphasized "the paramount importance of the equality of the six official languages of the United Nations" and requested that the secretary-general "ensure that vacancy announcements specified the need for either of the working languages of the Secretariat, unless the functions of the post required a specific working language".

In 2008 and 2009, resolutions of the General Assembly have urged the Secretariat to respect the parity of the six official languages, especially in the dissemination of public information.

The secretary-general's most recent report on multilingualism was issued on 4 October 2010. In response, on 19 July 2011, the General Assembly adopted Resolution No. A/RES/65/311 on multilingualism, calling on the secretary-general, once again, to ensure that all six official languages are given equally favourable working conditions and resources. The resolution noted with concern that the multilingual development of the UN website had improved at a much slower rate than expected. The drive to improve parity and focus on multilingualism continued throughout the 2010s and led to the United Nations news and media website (https://news.un.org/en/) to begin including translations of its content into Hindi, Portuguese, and Swahili in 2018.

Although there are only official UN language days for the six official languages of the UN, some UN organizations honor other language days. In 2019, World Portuguese Language Day was established by UNESCO, to be celebrated every May 5th. This is the date of the Community of Portuguese-speaking Countries (CPLC) Culture Day, which was selected to reference the first meeting of the Ministers of Culture of the CPLP in 2005. Portuguese-speaking Secretary-General António Guterres delivered remarks on this day. In 2021, the German Translation Section (GTS) at the UN Headquarters began celebrating an unofficial "German Language Day at the UN" every July 1st, coinciding with the date that the German Translation Service began operations in 1975. This is not an official UNESCO World Language Day, and is instead hosted by German-speaking diplomatic missions at the UN that fund the GTS. In July 2022, UNESCO established World Swahili Language Day, celebrated on July 7th in honor of the adoption of Kiswahili as a unifying language for the Tanganyika African National Union in 1954, as well as the re-establishment of the East African Community in 2000.

In June 2022, the United Nations General Assembly adopted a resolution on multilingualism that encouraged UN organizations to disseminate important communication and messages in official as well as non-official languages, similar to the semi-official policies proposed to Kofi Annan and Ban Ki-moon. These languages included Bengali, Hindi, Persian, Portuguese, Swahili, and Urdu and the GA recognizes the efforts of the UN to use non-official languages too.

== Timeline of official languages ==
League of Nations Official + Working Languages League of Nations Official Languages UN Official + Working Languages UN Official Languages Translation Available AND a UN Language Day dedicated Translation of UN News Website Available OR a UN Language Day dedicated

== UN News ==
As of June 2018, the media branch of the United Nations, UN News, includes website translations into Hindi, Portuguese, and Swahili in addition to the 6 official languages. Other UN documents and websites are also translated into Bengali, Urdu, French Creole, Indonesian, Malay, Persian, and Turkish but not on an official or consistent basis.

== Proposed additional languages ==
While there are no formal proposals before the General Assembly to add another official language, various individuals and states have informally raised the possibility of adding a new official language to accommodate more of the world's population. Similar to the path Arabic took to become an official language where Arab countries paid for the first few years of UN translation, it is expected that member states (i.e. Brazil for Portuguese, India for Hindi, Tanzania and Kenya for Swahili, etc.) would need to pay for the translation for the first few years before the UN would cover translation costs.

As of 2018, the media branch of the United Nations, UN News (https://news.un.org/), added translations into Portuguese, Swahili, and Hindi, and as of 2022 added translations into Urdu in addition to the existing 6 official languages. Other languages, such as Turkish, Persian, and Esperanto, have been formally or informally proposed in the past but were not added. The following languages are potential or future candidates for expanding the official languages of the UN, due to their translations being available on the global UN News site, the creation of UNESCO's World Portuguese Language Day and World Swahili Language Day, and a general increase in usage at United Nations organizations.

== Possible additional official languages of the United Nations, Ethnologue, 2025 ==
Language	First Language Speakers (L1) in millions	Second Language Speakers (L2) in millions	Total Speakers in millions	Number of Countries Spoken in	UN language status	UN News Website Translation	World Language Day Celebrated	Formal Register	Language family	Branch	ISO 639-3	Glottolog	Linguasphere	Main Regulating Body	Other Regulating Bodies
Portuguese	250	17	267	10	Non-official	Yes	Yes	Português	Indo-European	Romance	por	port1283	51-AAA-a	Academia Brasileira de Letras	Lisbon Academy, Academia Angolana
German	76	58	134	7	Non-official	No	Unofficially	Standardhochdeutsch	Indo-European	Germanic	deu	stan1295	52-ACB–dl	Council for German Orthography	
Swahili	16	184	200	7	Non-official	Yes	Yes	Kiswahili Sanifu (Kiunguja)	Niger-Congo	Bantu	swa	swah1254	99-AUS-m	BAKITA	CHAKITA, EAKC
Hindi	345	264	610	3	Non-official	Yes	No	Hindi (हिन्दी) in Devanagari	Indo-European	Indo-Iranian	hin	hind1269	59-AAF-qf	Central Hindi Directorate	
Urdu	78	168	246	2	Non-official	Yes	No	Urdu (اُردُو) in Nastaliq	Indo-European	Indo-Iranian	urd	urdu1245	59-AAF-q	National Language Promotion	National Council for Urdu
Bengali	242	43	284	2	Non-official	No	No	Bangla (বাংলা) in Nagri	Indo-European	Indo-Iranian	ben	beng1280	59-AAF-u	Bangla Academy	Bangla Akademi
Indonesian	75	177	252	2	Non-official	No	No	Bahasa Indonesia / Baku	Austronesian	Malayo-Polynesian	ind	indo1316	33-AFA-ac	Agency for Language Development	
Turkish	84	6	90	2	Non-official	No	No	Turkish (Türkçe)	Turkic	Oghuz	tur	nucl1301	44-AAB-a	Turkish Language Association	
Persian	91	35	127	3	Non-official	No	No	Iranian Persian (Farsi)	Indo-European	Indo-Iranian	fas / pes	fars1254	58-AAC-c	Academy of Persian Language	

Most of the proposed languages are world languages and rank as Level 0 (International) or Level 1 (Central) in the Expanded Graded Intergenerational Disruption Scale (EGIDS) and tend to be current or former lingua francas in their region that are either supra-regional or supercentral according to the global language system theory.

=== Bengali ===
Bengali is the sixth most spoken native language in the world, with over 242 million native speakers, after Mandarin, Spanish, English and Hindi and additional 43 million speak it as a second language. In April 2009, Prime Minister of Bangladesh Sheikh Hasina argued in front of the United Nations General Assembly that the Bengali language should be made one of the official languages of the UN. This was backed by a resolution adopted unanimously by the assembly of the Indian state of West Bengal in December.

=== German ===
German is an official language of the Central and Western European countries of Germany, Switzerland, Austria, Liechtenstein, Luxembourg, and Belgium, and is also a national language of Namibia in Southern Africa. It traditionally has been, and continues to be influential in the fields of philosophy, theology, science, and technology. The German-speaking countries (Deutscher Sprachraum) are major economic forces in both the European and global economies, with Germany alone having the third largest nominal gross domestic product (GDP) in the world. German has also historically served as a lingua franca in Central and Eastern Europe and to an extent continues to do so.

With over 130 million speakers, over 75 million of whom are native, German is the 12th most spoken language in the world and most spoken native language in the European Union, where it serves as one of the institution's working languages alongside English and French.

Since German reunification, there have been proposals for the expansion of the United Nations Security Council to include Germany as a permanent sixth member state. The country has also actively participated in programs alongside the other permanent UN Security Council member states, giving rise to the P5+1.

The German Translation Section at the United Nations Headquarters in New York held the first annual "German Language Day at the United Nations" on July 1, 2021, offering German-language film screenings and free German trial classes. These celebrations have not been officially established as a World Language Day by UNESCO, and are instead hosted by the four German-speaking diplomatic missions (Austria, Germany, Liechtenstein, and Switzerland) that provide most of the German Translation Section budget.

=== Hindi ===
Hindi is the fourth most spoken native language in the world, after Mandarin, Spanish, and English. It is one of the official languages of India and its related dialects are still being spoken by small minorities in Nepal. It is mutually intelligible to a high degree with Urdu which is official and spoken in Pakistan and together they are often considered the same language, referred to as Hindustani or Hindi–Urdu. Although very similar verbally, they do have different written scripts; Hindi is written in the Devanagari script and Urdu is written in the Nastaʿlīq script. Hindi has more than 550 million speakers in India alone, of whom 422 million are native, 98.2 million are second language speakers, and 31.2 million are third language speakers. Hindi is the lingua franca of the northern part of India, along with Pakistan (as Urdu), with its importance as a global language increasing day by day.

In 2007, it was reported that the government of India would "make immediate diplomatic moves to seek the status of an official language for Hindi at the United Nations". According to a 2009 press release from its Ministry of External Affairs, the Government of India has been "working actively" to have Hindi recognized as an official language of the UN. In 2015, Nepal's Vice President Parmananda Jha stated his firm support for the inclusion of Hindi as an official language of the UN. The United Nations media site already includes translations into Hindi.

=== Indonesian ===
Indonesian, known as Bahasa Indonesia is the official and national language of Indonesia. It is a standardized variety of the Sumatran dialect of Malay and is considered mutually intelligible with Bahasa Melayu, an Austronesian language that has been used as a lingua franca in the multilingual Indonesian archipelago for centuries. Indonesia is the fourth most populous nation in the world, with over 280 million inhabitants, the majority of whom can speak Indonesian, making it the largest language by number of speakers in Southeast Asia and one of the most widely spoken languages in the world. According to Ethnologue (2025), Indonesian is the 10th most commonly spoken language. Indonesian is also prominent on the internet, with one estimate ranking it sixth by number of Internet users. As part of the same Austronesian linguistic family, Indonesian is related to Filipino spoken in the Philippines.

The Indonesian Ministry of Education and Culture (Kemendikbud) has increasingly promoted Indonesian as an international language, with one target aiming for official UN language status by 2045.

=== Persian ===
Persian is a pluricentric language spoken in Iran where it is known as Farsi, Afghanistan where it is known as Dari, and Tajikistan where it is known as Tajik as well as Uzbekistan, Turkmenistan, Azerbaijan, Russia, Iraq, most areas of which have a Persianate history or are considered in the cultural sphere of Greater Iran. The main dialects of Persian, Dari and Tajik, are generally considered mutually intelligible. Classically originating from Achaemenid Empire and the Sassanian Empire, the Persian language and Iranian people have a rich cultural history of being at the interface of the Arabs, Turks, the Mughals and Desi peoples.

Spoken by over 127 million people (70 - 90 million L1 speakers and 30 - 50 million L2 speakers), Persian is the cultural language of Iran and is prominent in Central Asia.

=== Portuguese ===
Portuguese is the fifth most spoken language in the world. Many Lusophones have advocated for greater recognition of their language, which is widely spoken across four continents: Portugal (original place) in Europe; Brazil (the largest lusophone nation) in South America; Angola, Mozambique, Cape Verde, Guinea-Bissau, Equatorial Guinea, São Tomé and Príncipe in Africa; Timor-Leste and Macau in Asia. It is an official language in nine countries and one autonomous territory.

In 2008, the President of Portugal announced that the then eight leaders of the Community of Portuguese Language Countries (CPLP) had agreed to take the necessary steps to make Portuguese an official language. The media branch of the UN, UN News, already includes translations into Portuguese.

=== Swahili ===
Swahili is a lingua franca throughout eastern Africa and is especially prevalent in the African Great Lakes region. Swahili, known as Kiswahili by its speakers, is an official language of Tanzania, Kenya, Rwanda, the Democratic Republic of the Congo, is an official language of the African Union and is officially recognized as a lingua franca of the East African Community.

With between 150 and 200 million speakers, the Swahili lexicon is similar to that of other eastern Bantu languages such as Comorian, which have differing levels of mutual intelligibility. Swahili is already used unofficially in many UN organizations as the UN has an office in Nairobi (the United Nations Office at Nairobi), in addition to other major UN global offices in New York City, Vienna, and Geneva). The media branch of the UN, UN News, already includes translations into Swahili.

=== Turkish ===
In September 2011, during a meeting with UN Secretary-General Ban Ki-moon, Turkish Prime Minister Recep Tayyip Erdoğan expressed a desire to see Turkish become an official UN language.

=== Urdu ===
Urdu, the official language of Pakistan, is a standard of the pluricentric language known as Hindustani, or Hindi-Urdu, while Hindi is an official language of India. Urdu and Hindi share a common, predominantly Sanskrit- and Prakrit-derived, vocabulary base, phonology, syntax, and grammar, making them mutually intelligible during colloquial communication. Urdu has been described as a Persianised standard register of the Hindustani language. While formal Urdu draws literary, political, and technical vocabulary from Persian, formal Hindi draws these aspects from Sanskrit; consequently, the two languages' mutual intelligibility effectively decreases as the factor of formality increases. As of 2025, over 80 million speak Urdu as their first language while over 200 million people speak it as a second language. Including Urdu in addition to Hindi, and Bengali, as United Nations Official Languages would allow for greater coverage of South Asia. The media branch of the UN, UN News, already includes translations into Urdu.

== Coordinator for Multilingualism ==
In a 1999 resolution, the General Assembly requested the secretary-general to "appoint a senior Secretariat official as coordinator of questions relating to multilingualism throughout the Secretariat."

The first such coordinator was Federico Riesco of Chile, appointed on 6 September 2000.

Following Riesco's retirement, Miles Stoby of Guyana was appointed Coordinator for Multilingualism, effective 6 September 2001.

In 2003, Secretary-General Kofi Annan appointed Shashi Tharoor of India as Coordinator for Multilingualism. This responsibility was in addition to Tharoor's role as under-secretary-general for communications and public information, head of the Department of Public Information.

The current Coordinator for Multilingualism is Catherine Pollard of Guyana. She replaces Kiyo Akasaka of Japan, who was also under-secretary-general for communications and public information.

== Language Days at the UN ==
In 2010, the UN's Department of Public Information announced an initiative of six "language days" to be observed throughout the year, one for each official language, with the goal of celebrating linguistic diversity and learning about the importance of cross-cultural communication. UNESCO established World Portuguese Language Day in 2020 and World Swahili Language Day in 2022, although they do not have the same status as the six official UN language days. The days and their historical significance are:

- UN Arabic Language Day: 18 December (the date on which the United Nations General Assembly designated Modern Standard Arabic (MSA) as the fourth official language of the United Nations in 1973).
- UN Chinese Language Day: first celebrated 12 November; now set on 20 April ("to pay tribute to Cang Jie")
- UN English Language Day: 23 April ("the date traditionally observed as the birthday of William Shakespeare")
- UN French Language Day: 20 March (corresponding to the Journée internationale de la Francophonie
- UN Russian Language Day: 6 June (the birthday of Alexander Pushkin)
- UN Spanish Language Day: first celebrated on 12 October (celebrated in the Spanish-speaking world as "Día de la Hispanidad"; compare Columbus Day), now set on 23 April (in honor of Miguel de Cervantes, who died on the same day in 1616)
- World Portuguese Language Day: 5 May (CPLC Culture Day, the first meeting of CPLC Ministers of Culture in 2005)
- World Swahili Language Day: 7 July (the date Julius Nyerere adopted the Swahili Language as a unifying language for independence struggles.)

== UN specialised agencies ==
UN independent agencies have their own sets of official languages that sometimes are different from that of the principal UN organs. For example, the General Conference of UNESCO has ten official languages including Hindi, Indonesian, Italian, and Portuguese. The Universal Postal Union has just one official language, French. IFAD has four official languages: Arabic, English, French, and Spanish.

== Parallels with other multilingual institutions ==
The next largest international grouping after the UN is the Commonwealth of Nations which is exclusively English speaking and has 56 members, and the Organisation internationale de la francophonie which is exclusively French speaking and has 54 members. All other international bodies in commerce, transport and sport have tended to the adoption of one or a few languages as the means of communication. This is usually English and French (see: list of international organisations which have French as an official language). Regional groups have adopted what is common to other elements of their ethnic or religious background. Standard Arabic is usually adopted across Muslim nation groups. Most of non-Arab Africa is either Francophone or Anglophone because of their imperial past, but there is also a lusophone grouping of countries for the same reason.

== See also ==
- List of official languages
- List of official languages of international organizations
- List of languages by number of native speakers
- List of languages by total number of speakers
- Languages of the European Union
- International Mother Language Day
- League of Nations § Languages and symbols
- The Interpreter
- Waste Isolation Pilot Plant § Awareness triggers
