= World Kiswahili Language Day =

New United Nations Swahili Language Day

World Kiswahili Language Day Siku ya Kiswahili ya Umoja wa Mataifa
- Date: 7 July
- Next time: 7 July 2026
- Frequency: annual
- First time: July 2022; 3 years ago
- Related to: International Mother Language Day, UN Arabic Language Day, UN Chinese Language Day, UN English Language Day, UN French Language Day, UN Portuguese Language Day, UN Russian Language Day, UN Spanish Language Day

World Kiswahili Language Day (Swahili: Siku ya Kiswahili ya Umoja wa Mataifa duniani) is observed annually on 7 July. This began when UNESCO declared 7 July as Kiswahili Language Day in 2022. On 7 July 1954, Tanganyika African National Union (TANU) leader Julius Kambarage Nyerere, the future first president of Tanzania, adopted the Swahili language as a unifying language for African independence struggles. Jomo Kenyatta, the first president of Kenya, followed suit and also used the Swahili language to mobilize and unify the people of Kenya in the struggle against colonialism through the use of the popular "Harambee" slogan.

World Kiswahili Language Day marks the first United Nations designation of an African-originated language for a Official languages of the United Nations § Language Days at the UN, the other language days were from the six (6) official languages of the United Nations which are Arabic, Mandarin Chinese, English, French, Russian, Spanish.

The Swahili language is in the Niger-Congo language group and originated as a trade language amongst the people of the eastern African coast and the northern coast of Madagascar. Sixteen to twenty percent of the Swahili vocabulary are Arabic loanwords, including the name of the language (سَوَاحِلي, sawāḥilī, a plural adjectival form of an Arabic word meaning 'of the coast'). The loanwords date from contact with Arabic-speaking traders with the Bantu inhabitants of the east coast of Africa from the 1500s to European colonization. Swahili is currently a prominent language spoken in a variety of locations along the African Great Lakes Region and is spoken by upwards of 200 million people as a second language.

== Swahili Poets ==
- Shaaban Robert
- Christopher Mwashinga
- Mathias Mnyampala

== See also ==
- International Mother Language Day
- International observance
- Official languages of the United Nations
- African Union § Languages
- East African Community
- Southern African Development Community
- Baraza la Kiswahili la Taifa
- Chama cha Kiswahili cha Taifa
- African Great Lakes Region
- List of official languages
- List of official languages by institution
- List of languages by number of native speakers
