= International Year of Languages =

The United Nations General Assembly proclaimed 2008 as the International Year of Languages, pursuant to a resolution of UNESCO. The resolution also reaffirmed the need to achieve full parity among the six official languages on United Nations websites.

== Origination ==
The Year was intended to address issues of linguistic diversity (in the context of cultural diversity), respect for all languages, and multilingualism. The resolution also discussed language issues in the United Nations itself.

UNESCO was charged with coordinating observance of the Year, and officially launched it on the occasion of International Mother Language Day, 21 February 2008.

== Observances ==
In addition to official events run by UNESCO, various national, academic and non-governmental organizations sponsored events, websites, and other observances of the IYL. The UNESCO website has a list of projects submitted by individuals and organizations.

== See also ==
- Universal Declaration of Linguistic Rights

== Bibliography ==
- Jostes, Brigitte (2012): Anno 2008: Internationales Sprachenjahr und internationale Fragen der sprachlichen Bildung. In: PhiN 60, 14–47.
