= UN Russian Language Day =

International observance, June 6

United Nations Russian Language Day День русского языка Организации Объединённых Наций
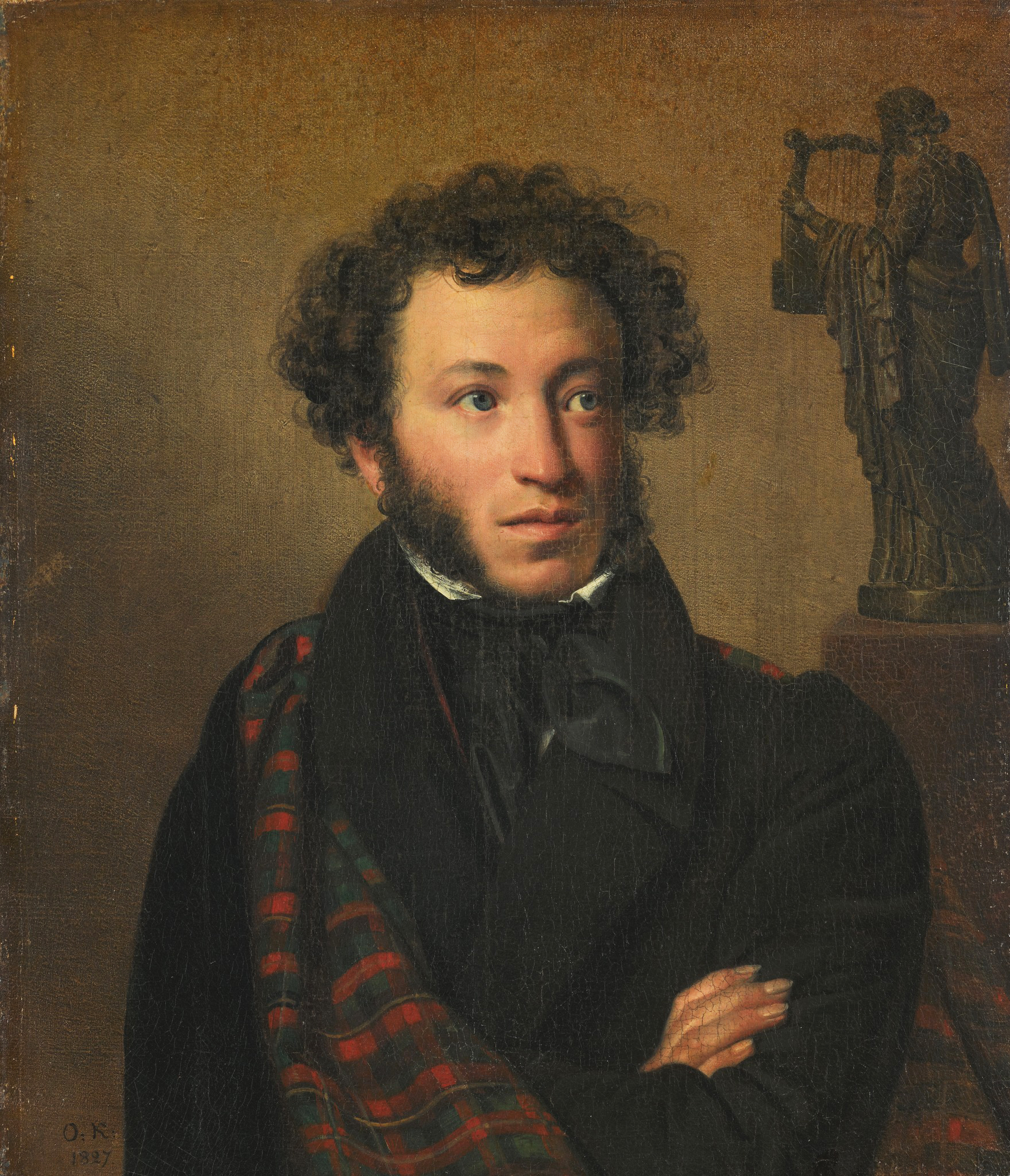
- Alexander Pushkin
- Date: June 6
- Next time: June 6, 2027
- Frequency: annual
- First time: 2010; 16 years ago
- Related to: International Mother Language Day, UN Arabic Language Day, UN Chinese Language Day, UN English Language Day, UN French Language Day, UN Portuguese Language Day, UN Spanish Language Day, UN Swahili Language Day

UN Russian Language Day (Russian: День русского языка Организации Объединённых Наций) is observed annually on 6 June. The event was established by the United Nations Educational, Scientific and Cultural Organization (UNESCO) in 2010. UN Russian Language Day coincides with the birthday of Alexander Pushkin, a Russian poet who is considered the father of the modern Russian language.

The initiative of the UN Language Days was launched in February 2010 in order to celebrate multilingualism and cultural diversity and to promote the equal use of all six of the UN's official working languages throughout the organisation.

In the Russian Federation, the holiday was established in 2011 as a Russian state holiday.

== History ==
The idea of establishing a Russian Language Day was first proposed by Ivan Klimenko, the author of the "Russian Word Game" project, on the pages of the Parlamentskaya Gazeta on 26 December 2007. In his article, summarising the results of the Year of the Russian Language, the author noted: "... the experience of the named Year shows that for the inevitable development of the language in each coming calendar year there must also be one named Day. A Day of the Russian Language. A worldwide celebration for the entire Russian world." However, neither the legislative nor the executive branches of the Russian government responded to the proposal.

Even earlier, in 1996, the Russian Community of Crimea began celebrating the Day of the Russian Language on 6 June, the birthday of Alexander Pushkin. Starting in 2007, at their initiative, 6 June became the date of the International Festival of Russian and Slavic Culture "The Great Russian Word" in Crimea. On that day each year, the President of the Russian Federation sends greetings to the festival's participants.

On 6 June 2011, Russian President Dmitry Medvedev signed a decree: "To establish a Day of the Russian Language and to celebrate it annually on 6 June, the birthday of the great Russian poet Alexander Pushkin, the founder of the modern Russian literary language."

== See also ==
- International Mother Language Day
- International observance
- Official languages of the United Nations
- Russian Language Institute
- Pushkin Institute
- International Russian Language Organisation
