= UN French Language Day =

Day to celebrate the French language

UN French Language Day Journée de la langue française
- Date: 20 March
- Next time: 20 March 2026
- Frequency: Annual
- First time: 2010; 15 years ago
- Related to: International Francophonie Day; International Mother Language Day; UN Arabic Language Day; UN Chinese Language Day; UN English Language Day; UN Portuguese Language Day; UN Russian Language Day; UN Spanish Language Day; UN Swahili Language Day

UN French Language Day (French: Journée de la langue française) is observed annually on 20 March. The event was established by UN's Department of Public Information in 2010 "to celebrate multilingualism and cultural diversity as well as to promote equal use of all six official languages throughout the Organization".

For the French language, 20 March was chosen as the date since it "coincides with the 40th anniversary of the International Organization of La Francophonie", a group whose members share a common tongue, as well as the humanist values promoted by the French language. Other dates were selected for the celebration of the UN's other five official languages.

== See also ==
- International Mother Language Day
- International observance
- Official languages of the United Nations
