= UN English Language Day =

Celebrated every April 23

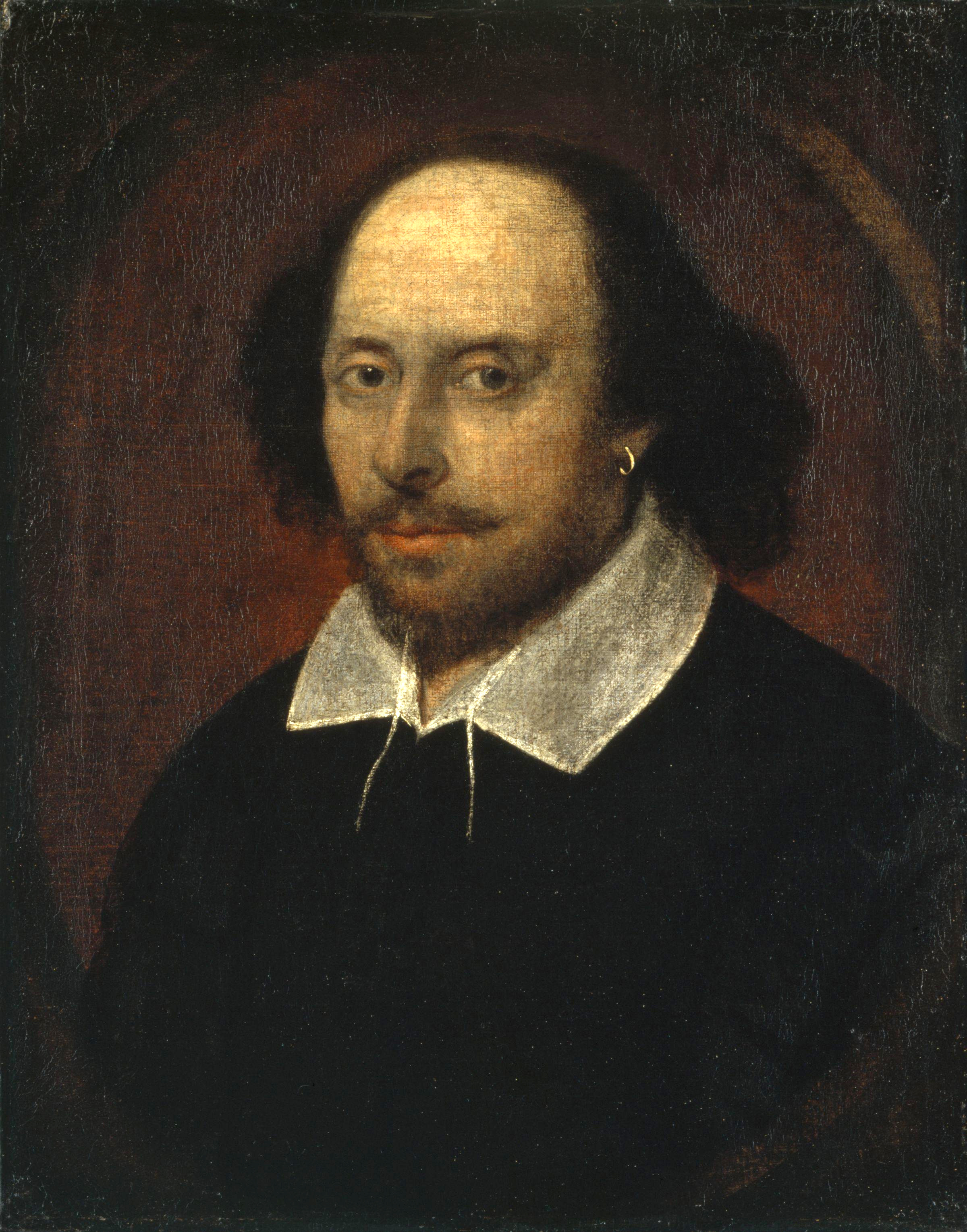

UN English Day is observed annually on 23 April. The event was established by UN's Department of Public Information in 2010 "to celebrate multilingualism and cultural diversity as well as to promote equal use of all six official languages throughout the Organization".

For the English Language Day, April 23 was chosen because it is the date "traditionally observed as both the birthday and date of death of William Shakespeare". Other dates were selected for the celebration of the UN's other five official languages.

== See also ==
- International Mother Language Day
- International observance
- Official languages of the United Nations
- UN Arabic Language Day
- UN Chinese Language Day
- UN French Language Day
- UN Portuguese Language Day
- UN Russian Language Day
- UN Spanish Language Day
- UN Swahili Language Day
- World Book Day
