= Angolan Portuguese =

Variety of Portuguese language

- português angolano, português de Angola
- Native to: Angola
- Native speakers: 12 million (48% of the population) (2016); 26 million (71% of the population) spoke Portuguese at home, often alongside a Bantu language (2014 census)
- Language family: Indo-European: Italic; Latin; Romance; Western Romance; Ibero-Romance; West-Iberian; Galician-Portuguese; Portuguese; Angolan Portuguese
- Writing system: Latin (Portuguese alphabet); Portuguese Braille

Official status
- Official language in: Angola
- Regulated by: Academia Angolana de Letras

Language codes
- ISO 639-3: –
- Glottolog: None
- IETF: pt-AO

Angolan Portuguese (Portuguese: português de Angola) is a group of dialects and accents of Portuguese used in Angola. In 2005, it was spoken by 60% of the country's population, including by 20% as their first language. The 2016 CIA World Fact Book reports that 12.3 million, or 47% of the population, speaks Portuguese as their first language. However, many parents raise their children to speak only Portuguese. The 2014 census found that 71% speak Portuguese at home, many of them alongside a Bantu language, breaking down to 85% in urban areas and 49% in rural areas.

There are different stages of Portuguese in Angola in a similar manner to other Portuguese-speaking African countries. Some closely approximate Standard Portuguese pronunciation and are associated with the upper class and younger generations of urban background. Angola is the country with the second-highest number of Portuguese speakers, behind only Brazil.

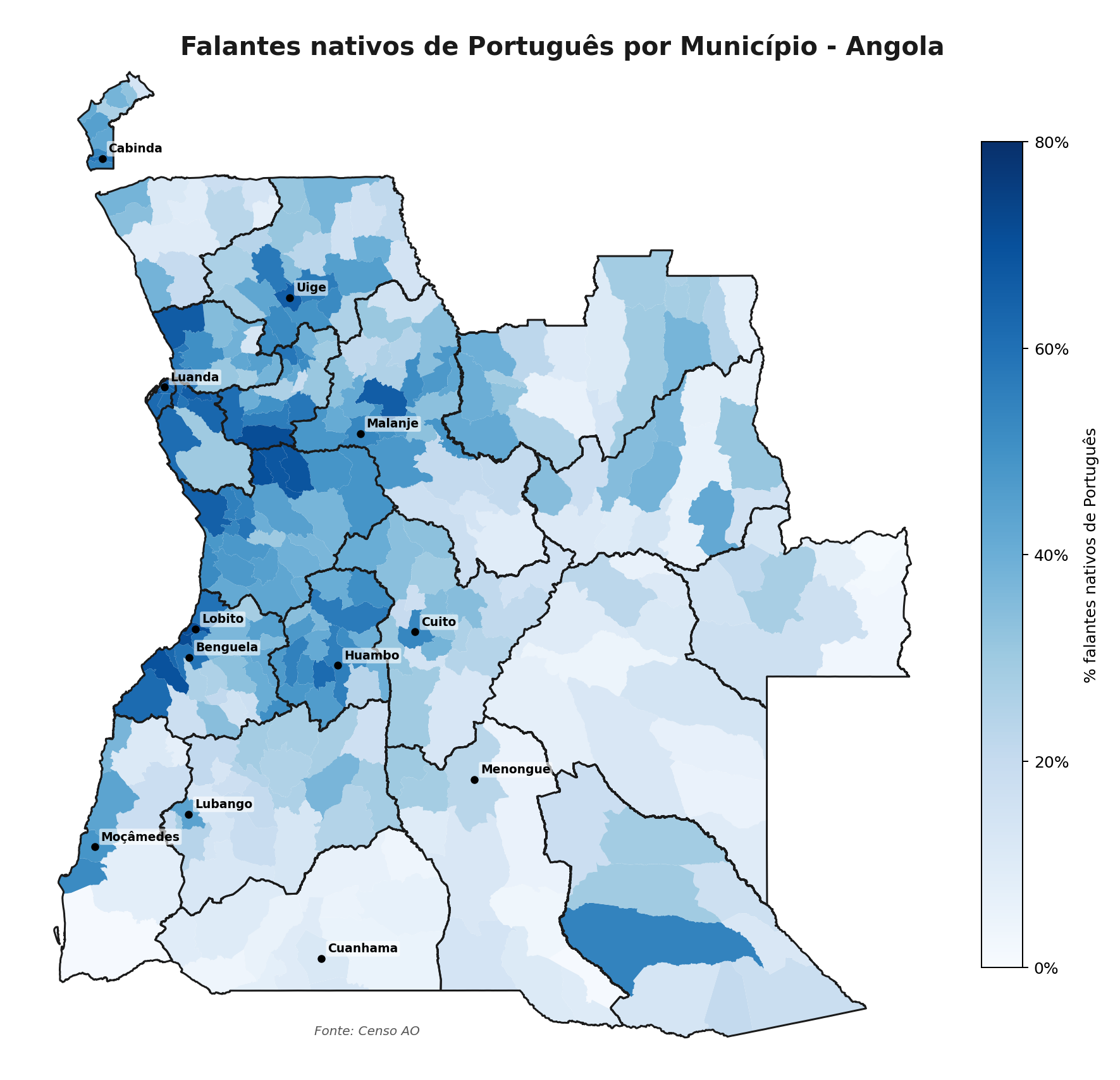
Portuguese as a Native Language in Angola - Geographical Distribution

== Phonology ==
The standard phonology in Angola is based on the European standard, as in the rest of Lusophone Africa. Vernacular accents share similarities with Brazilian Portuguese and these similar features have historical reasons. As with Portuguese spoken in Mozambique, the Portuguese spoken in Angola is influenced by Bantu languages. However, the contemporary Standard European Portuguese is the preferred pronunciation, as such it has become a transitional dialect somewhat midway between the European and Brazilian varieties.

=== Vowels ===
Oral vowels
	Front	Central	Back
Close	i	ɨ	u
Close-mid	e		o
Open-mid	ɛ	ɐ	ɔ
Open		a	

Nasal vowels
	Front	Central	Back
Close	ĩ		ũ
Mid	ẽ		õ
Open		ã	

Oral diphthongs
		Endpoint	
		/i/	/u/
Start point	/a/	aj	aw
Start point	/ɛ/	ɛj	ɛw
Start point	/e/	ej	ew
Start point	/i/		iw
Start point	/ɔ/	ɔj	
Start point	/o/	oj	
Start point	/u/	uj	

Nasal diphthongs
		Endpoint	
		/j̃/	/w̃/
Start point	/ã/	ãj̃	ãw̃
Start point	/ẽ/	ẽj̃	
Start point	/õ/	õj̃	
Start point	/ũ/	ũj	

- The close central vowel /ɨ/ occurs only at final, unstressed syllables, e.g. presidente /pɾeziˈdẽtɨ/.
- The open vowels /ɐ/ and /a/ merge to [a], and likewise /ɐ/ appears only in unstressed final syllables, unlike in European Portuguese, where it occurs in most unstressed syllables, e.g. rama /ˈʁamɐ/. The nasal /ɐ̃/ becomes open [ã].
- In vernacular varieties, the diphthong /ej/ is typically monophthongized to [e], e.g. sei /ˈsej/ < [ˈse].
- In vernacular varieties, the diphthong /ow/ is typically monophthongized to [o], e.g. sou /ˈsow/ < [ˈso].

=== Consonants ===
- /ɲ/ is often realised as [j̃], e.g. ninho [ˈnĩj̃u], and nasalizes the vowel that precedes it.
- Word-final /r/ ([ɾ, ʁ]) is dropped, especially by people who speak Portuguese as their second language.

== Lexicon ==
Although most of the vocabulary is the same as in Portugal, Brazil or Mozambique, there are differences, many due to the influence of African languages spoken in Angola. In the capital, Luanda, indigenous languages are practically nonexistent.

Angola	Portugal	Brazil	Translation
bazar	ir embora, bazar (slang)	ir embora, vazar (slang)	to go away/home
garina	rapariga, miúda, gaja (slang)	garota, guria (in the south)	girl
jinguba	amendoim, alcagoita	amendoim	peanut
machimbombo, autocarro	autocarro	ônibus	bus
musseque	bairro de lata	favela	slum quarter
geleira	frigorífico	geladeira	fridge

Examples of words borrowed from Kimbundu into Angolan Portuguese include:

- cubata 'house'
- muamba 'chicken stew'
- quinda 'basket'
- umbanda, milongo 'medicine'
- quituxe 'crime'

== Influence ==
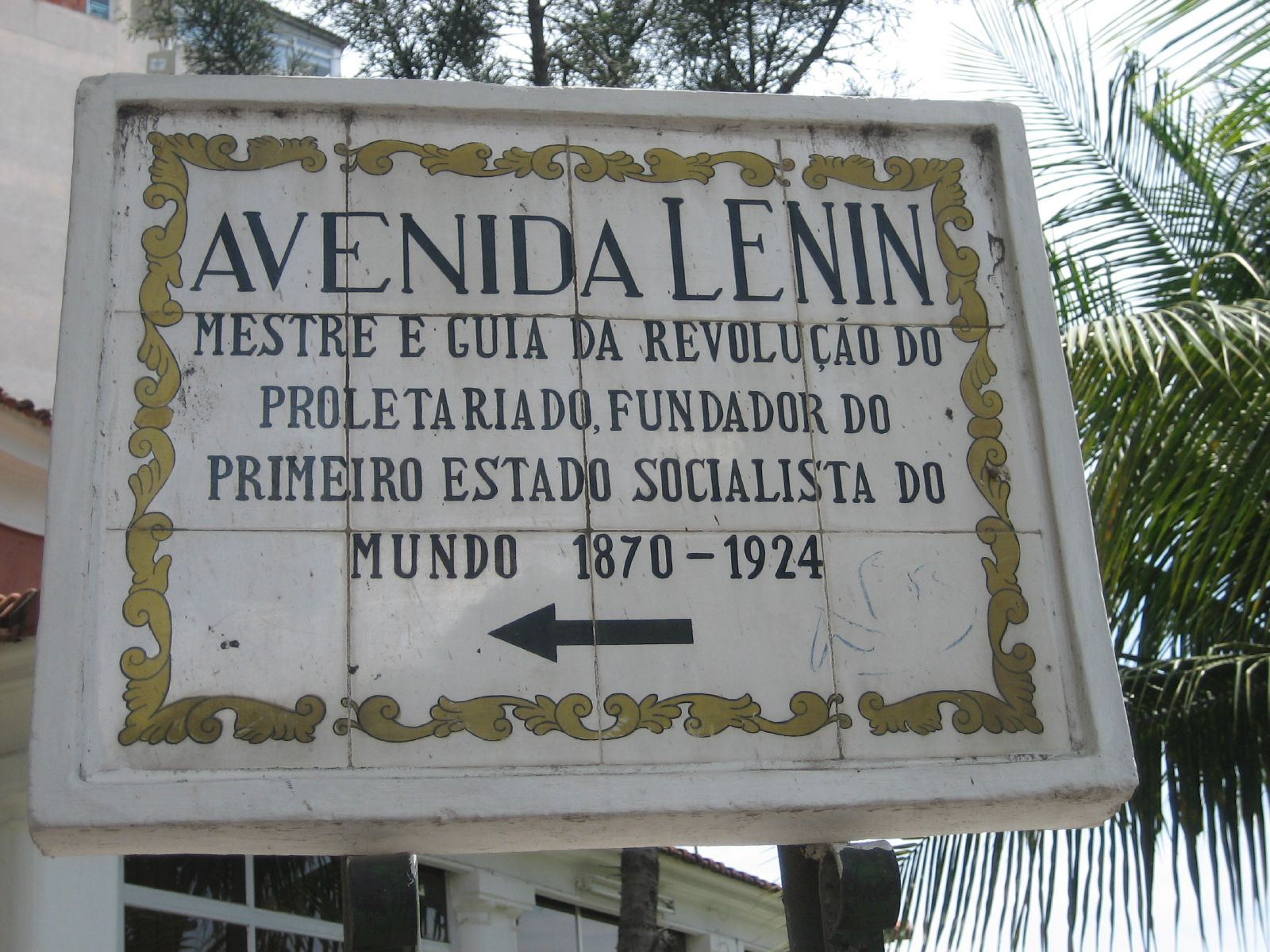
Sign in Portuguese at the Avenida de Lenin (Lenin avenue) in Luanda

Many words of Angolan origin are used in other variants of Portuguese. Among these words are bunda (backside or "bottom"); fuba [fubá in Brazil] (maize flour); moleque ("kid"); kizomba and kuduro.

Various aspects of Brazilian culture – samba, candomblé and capoeira – all bear linguistic traces of this contact.

In Portugal, Angolan Portuguese has had a large influence on the vernacular of the younger population, contributing significant amounts of lexicon. Examples include:

- bazar ("to go away/home")
- garina ("girl")
- bumbar ("to work" in Angola, "to party" in Portugal; sometimes spelt as bombar)
- bué ("many", "a lot")
- iá ("yes")

Many of these words and expressions made their way to Portugal through immigration of black Angolans as a result of the Angolan civil war.

== See also ==
- Portuguese language in Africa
- São Tomean Portuguese
- Kimbundu
- Cape Verdean Portuguese
- Televisão Pública de Angola

== Bibliography ==
- Di Gregorio, Anete Mariza Torres (2006). "Particularidades lingüísticas no português de Angola" [Linguistic Features in Angolan Portuguese]. Revista Philologus (in Portuguese). 11 (34). Archived from the original on 2007-06-22.
- Undolo, Márcio (2014). "Caracterização do sistema vocálico do português culto falado em Angola" [Characterization of the Vowel System of Learned Portuguese Spoken in Angola]. Revista de Filología Románica (in Portuguese). 31 (2): 181–187. doi:10.5209/rev_RFRM.2014.v31.n2.51071.
