= UN Arabic Language Day =

International event

UN Arabic Language Day اليوم العالمي للغة العربية
- Arabic Language Day slogan
- Date: December 18
- Next time: December 18, 2026
- Frequency: annual
- First time: 2012; 14 years ago
- Related to: International Mother Language Day, UN Chinese Language Day, UN English Language Day, UN French Language Day, UN Portuguese Language Day, UN Russian Language Day, UN Spanish Language Day, UN Swahili Language Day

UN Arabic Language Day (Arabic: اليوم العالمي للغة العربية) is observed annually on December 18. The event was established by the UN Educational, Scientific and Cultural Organization (UNESCO) in 2012 seeking "to celebrate multilingualism and cultural diversity as well as to promote equal use of all six of its official working languages throughout the organization". December 18 was chosen as the date for the Arabic language because it is "the day in 1973 when the General Assembly approved Arabic as an official UN language".

== History ==
At the third session of the UNESCO General Conference held in Beirut, Lebanon in 1948, Arabic was declared an official working language alongside English and French.

On December 4, 1955 the United Nations General Assembly adopted Resolution 878 (IX) authorizing the translation of some official documents of the General Assembly into Arabic. This resolution limited the amount of translation to "a total of 4,000 pages of English text," and required that the documents to be related to "specific or general problems of interest to areas where Arabic is spoken".

At the eleventh session of the UNESCO General Conference in Paris, France in 1960, UNESCO adopted a resolution mandating the use of Arabic in regional conferences held in Arabic-speaking countries and the translation of key documents and publications into Arabic. A subsequent resolution was adopted in 1966 to provide simultaneous interpretation of Arabic during sessions, as well as translations of key documents into Arabic.

In the same year on September 27, Gamal Abdel Nasser, president of the then United Arab Republic, became the first leader to deliver a speech in Arabic at the 15th Session of the United Nations General Assembly. As Arabic was not an official language of the United Nations, two translators had to spend the following night translating his speech into English.

Arab diplomatic pressure continued, spearheaded by Morocco in cooperation with other Arabic states, until the UN General Assembly adopted Resolution 3190 (XXVIII) on 18 December 1973, adding Arabic to the list of official and working languages of the General Assembly and its bodies.

On October 2012, UNESCO declared December 18th as UN Arabic Language Day, commemorating the date Resolution 3190 was passed on in 1973.

== See also ==
- Arabic Language
- Official languages of the United Nations
- International Mother Language Day
- International observance
- AIDA - International Association of Arabic Dialectology
