= World Portuguese Language Day =

Observance holiday on May 5

World Portuguese Language Day Dia Mundial da Língua Portuguesa
- Observed by: Portuguese-speaking people worldwide
- Date: May 5
- Next time: May 5, 2027
- Frequency: annual
- First time: May 5, 2009; 17 years ago
- Started by: Community of Portuguese Language Countries
- Related to: International Mother Language Day, UN Arabic Language Day, UN Chinese Language Day, UN English Language Day, UN French Language Day, UN Russian Language Day, UN Spanish Language Day, UN Swahili Language Day

World Portuguese Language Day (Portuguese: Dia Mundial da Língua Portuguesa) is observed annually on May 5. The day is marked through a range of musical performances, literature readings, competitions, cultural shows, art exhibitions, lectures, plays, and other cultural events worldwide in order to highlight the use and spread of the Portuguese language around the world.

The observance was established on July 20, 2009 by the Community of Portuguese Language Countries (CPLP) as Portuguese Language and Culture Day. The date of May 5 was chosen to coincide with the first meeting of the Ministers of Culture of the CPLP which occurred in 2005 and was subsequently declared Dia da Cultura da CPLP.

In November 2019, the 40th session of UNESCO's General Conference decided to proclaim May 5 of each year as "World Portuguese Language Day".

== See also ==
- International Mother Language Day
- International observance
- Official languages of the United Nations
