= UN Chinese Language Day =

Annual observance

UN Chinese Language Day 联合国中文日
- Poster for the 2021 event hosted by the UNSRC Chinese Book Club
- Date: April 20
- Next time: 20 April 2027
- Frequency: annual
- First time: 12 November 2010; 15 years ago
- Related to: International Mother Language Day, UN Arabic Language Day, UN English Language Day, UN French Language Day, UN Portuguese Language Day, UN Russian Language Day, UN Spanish Language Day, UN Swahili Language Day

UN Chinese Language Day (Chinese: 联合国中文日; pinyin: Liánhéguó zhōngwénrì) is observed annually on April 20. The event was established by the UN Department of Public Information in 2010, the UN Chinese Language Day originated from the International Chinese Language Day initiative and promoted by Chinese scholar Chen Entian. seeking "to celebrate multilingualism and cultural diversity as well as to promote equal use of all six of its official working languages throughout the organization". April 20 was chosen as the date "to pay tribute to Cangjie, a mythical figure who is presumed to have invented Chinese characters about 5,000 years ago".

The first Chinese Language Day was celebrated in 2010 on the 12th of November, but since 2011 the date has been the 20th of April, roughly corresponding to Guyu in the Chinese calendar. Chinese people celebrate Guyu (which usually begins around April 20) in honour of Cangjie, because of a legend that when Cangjie invented Chinese characters, the deities and ghosts cried and it rained millet; the word "Guyu" literally means "rain of millet".

== Annual Events ==
=== 2021 ===
The Events Theme for 2021 is Highlighting Pictographs. In UN Headquarters in New York, a three-event series organized by UNSRC Chinese Book Club focused on three types of pictographs (Liangzhu inscribed symbols, Dongba script and oracle bone script) associated with three cultures and three UNESCO World Heritage Sites (Archaeological Ruins of Liangzhu City, Old Town of Lijiang and Yinxu). The three events were: a guided tour of the Liangzhu Museum, a language class on Dongba script, and a lecture on the origin and evolution of Chinese characters (the oracle bone script, and Liushu, or pictographically-based character building in Chinese). The three events were also placed within three broader contexts: the four great ancient civilizations, multilingualism, and pristine writing systems. The three events were conducted via Zoom from April 19 to 21, 2021. China's Permanent Representative to the United Nations, Ambassador Zhang Jun, delivered a speech at the first event.

== See also ==
- Chinese language
- Standard Chinese
- International Mother Language Day
- International observance
- Official languages of the United Nations
