= UN Spanish Language Day =

Annual observation on 23 April

UN Spanish Language Day Día del Idioma Español en las Naciones Unidas
- Date: 23 April
- Next time: 23 April 2025
- Frequency: annual
- First time: 12 October 2010; 14 years ago
- Related to: International Mother Language Day, UN Arabic Language Day, UN Chinese Language Day, UN English Language Day, UN French Language Day, UN Portuguese Language Day, UN Russian Language Day, UN Swahili Language Day

UN Spanish Language Day (Spanish: Día del Idioma Español en las Naciones Unidas) is observed annually on 23 April. The event was established by the UN's Department of Public Information in 2010, seeking "to celebrate multilingualism and cultural diversity as well as to promote equal use of all six of its official working languages throughout the organization". The day was first observed on 12 October to celebrate the Día de la Hispanidad in some Spanish-speaking countries for the discovery of American continent. Later, the day was changed to 23 April, to pay tribute to Spanish writer Miguel de Cervantes Saavedra, who died on 22 April 1616.

== See also ==
- Columbus Day
- International Mother Language Day
- International observance
- Official languages of the United Nations
