= Syed Muazzem Ali =

Bangladeshi diplomat and foreign service officer (1944–2019)

- সৈয়দ মোয়াজ্জেম আলী
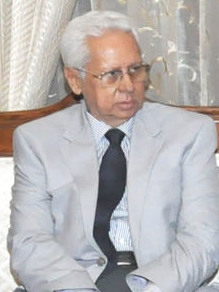
- Ali in New Delhi (2015)

High Commissioner of Bangladesh to India
- In office 2014 – November 2019
- Preceded by: Tariq Ahmed Karim
- Succeeded by: Muhammad Imran

Ambassador of Bangladesh to France
- In office 15 October 1998 – 4 March 2001
- Preceded by: Tufail Karim Haider
- Succeeded by: Jahangir Saadat

Ambassador of Bangladesh to Bhutan
- In office 25 January 1991 – 4 April 1992
- Preceded by: Abul Hassan Mahmood Ali
- Succeeded by: M. Mizanur Rahman

Personal details
- Born: 18 July 1944 Sylhet district, Assam Province, British India
- Died: 30 December 2019 (aged 75) Dhaka, Bangladesh
- Spouse: Tuhfa Zaman Ali
- Children: 2 sons
- Relatives: Syed Mohammad Ali (brother); Syed Mujtaba Ali (uncle); Syed Murtaza Ali (uncle); Shegufta Bakht Chaudhuri (cousin)
- Education: University of Dhaka; Johns Hopkins University

Syed Muazzem Ali (18 July 1944 – 30 December 2019) was a Bangladeshi foreign service officer and career diplomat. In 2020, he was posthumously conferred the Padma Bhushan award, the third-highest civilian honour of India. In 2022, he was awarded the Ekushey Padak, the second most important award for civilians in Bangladesh.

== Early life ==
Syed Muazzem Ali was born on 18 July 1944 into a Bengali Muslim Sayyid family of Khondakars from the Sylhet district, Assam Province in British India. He traced his paternal descent from Shah Syed Ahmed Mutawakkil, a Sufi Peer and a Syed of Taraf, though apparently unrelated to Taraf's ruling Syed dynasty. Ali's father was Syed Mustafa Ali, a historian and a civil servant employed by the British Raj in Assam Province. The family's ancestral home is Khandakar Bari in Uttarsur Village of Bahubal Upazila of Habiganj District. His uncles were prominent in society, his uncle Syed Mujtaba Ali was a renowned linguist, his other uncle was Syed Murtaza Ali, a prominent writer.

Ali completed his bachelor's and master's in zoology with first class from the University of Dhaka. He joined the Pakistan Civil Service and was trained at the Civil Service Academy in Lahore. From 1973 to 1974 he studied at the School of Advanced International Studies, Johns Hopkins University.

== Career ==
Ali was serving in the Pakistan Embassy in Washington D.C. when Bangladesh Liberation war started, and he defected to the Bangladeshi government in exile. He helped found the Bangladeshi embassy to the United States. He helped funnel resources from the United States and the United Nations to the reconstruction of Bangladesh. From 1975 to 1978, he served in the Bangladeshi embassy in Poland. He worked in the Permanent Mission to the United Nations in New York from 1982 to 1986.

Ali was the consul in Jeddah, Saudi Arabia during the Gulf War. He would go on to serve as Bangladesh Ambassador to Bhutan, Iran, Lebanon, Turkmenistan, France, Syria, and Portugal. Ali was Bangladesh's permanent representative to the UNESCO, where (in cooperation with Tony Huq, former permanent representative to UNESCO and then UNESCO special adviser), he helped establish the International Mother Language Day on 21 February through the introduction of the draft resolution, the Language movement day. He then served as the foreign secretary of Bangladesh, where he worked to facilitate duty free for exports of least developed country to Europe. He served as the High Commissioner of Bangladesh to India during 2014–2019.

== Personal life and death ==
Ali was married to Tuhfa Zaman Ali, a daughter of Chowdhury Imamuzaman, who served in the Assam Engineering Service prior to 1947. Tuhfa obtained her MA from the University of Dhaka and MPhil from Jawaharlal Nehru University, New Delhi. They had two sons.

Ali's elder brother Syed Mohammad Ali (1928–1993) was the founding editor of The Daily Star. Their sister, Syeda Fawzia Ally (d. 2024), was an educationist and former principal of Chittagong College and Badrunnessa College.

Ali died on 30 December 2019 at the age of 75 at Combined Military Hospital, Dhaka.
