= Mother Tongue Film Festival =

The Mother Tongue Film Festival is an annual international film festival of films with lesser-used languages from around the world. It is organized by the Smithsonian Institution in Washington, D.C., and has been held to coincide with International Mother Tongue Day on 21 February each year since 2016.

It is run by the Recovering Voices program, composed of groups in collaboration with each other including the National Museum of Natural History, the National Museum of the American Indian, and the Center for Folklife and Cultural Heritage. They are supported by several organizations such as the Smithsonian American Art Museum, Q?rius, The Coralyn W. Whitney Science Education Center, the Embassy of Canada to the United States, the University of Edinburgh, New York University at Washington DC, the Québec Government Office in Washington DC, Eaton Workshop DC, the Georgetown University Department of Anthropology, The WEM Foundation & Betty and Whitney MacMillan and Ferring Pharmaceuticals.
