= Syed Mohammad Ali =

Bengali journalist and editor (1928–1993)

- Born: 5 December 1928; Moulvibazar, Assam Province, British India
- Died: 17 October 1993 (aged 64); Bangkok, Thailand
- Education: University of Dhaka
- Occupations: Journalist, editor
- Spouse: Nancy Wong
- Relatives: Syed Muazzem Ali (brother); Syed Mujtaba Ali (uncle); Syed Murtaza Ali (uncle); Shegufta Bakht Chaudhuri (cousin)

Syed Mohammad Ali (9 December 1928 – 17 October 1993) was a Bengali journalist and editor. Ali began his career in East Pakistan. He became an editor for several newspapers in East Asia, including The Bangkok Post in Thailand, the Hong Kong Standard in British Hong Kong and The New Nation in Singapore. Ali also worked for UNESCO. In 1991, Ali founded The Daily Star in Bangladesh during the country's democratic transition.

== Family ==
Syed Mohammad Ali Khandakar was born on 18 July 1944 into a Bengali Muslim Syed family of Khandakars from the Sylhet district, Assam Province in British Raj. He traced his paternal descent from Shah Syed Ahmed Mutawakkil, a Sufi Peer and a Syed of Taraf, though apparently unrelated to Taraf's ruling Syed dynasty. Ali's father was Syed Mostafa Ali, a historian and a civil servant employed by the British Raj in Assam Province. The family's ancestral home is Khandakar Bari in Uttarsur Village of Bahubal Upazila of Habiganj District. His uncles were prominent in society, his uncle Syed Mujtaba Ali was a renowned linguist, his other uncle was Syed Murtaza Ali, a prominent writer. His other siblings were Syed Muazzem Ali, a diplomat; Syed Shaukat Ally, a service-holder and Syeda Fawzia Ally, an academic.

== Career ==
Ali's journalistic career spanned 44 years. He started his career as a reporter for The Pakistan Observer, the largest circulated English-language daily in East Pakistan. The newspaper became The Bangladesh Observer in 1971. Ali was the Managing Editor of The Bangkok Post between 1966 and 1970. Later, he served as the roving foreign editor of the Singaporean newspaper The New Nation. He became the managing editor of the Hong Kong Standard under British rule in Hong Kong.

Ali was also an international bureaucrat. He joined the United Nations and worked for the United Nations Educational, Scientific and Cultural Organization (UNESCO). During the 1980s, Ali and fellow UNESCO colleague Mahfuz Anam conceived the creation of a newspaper in their native country of Bangladesh.

Ali and Anam founded The Daily Star in Bangladesh during the transition from presidential government to parliamentary democracy in 1991. The period also saw liberal economic reforms. The newspaper became influential for its editorials which touched on sensitive political topics. The newspaper emerged as the country's largest circulated English-language daily. Ali and Anam interviewed key political figures, including erstwhile Leader of the Opposition Sheikh Hasina. Ali also became the chairman of the Press Institute of Bangladesh (PIB). Ali served as editor of The Daily Star until his death in 1993.

== Awards ==
In 1995, the government of Prime Minister Khaleda Zia posthumously awarded Bangladesh's highest civilian honour on Ali.

== Personal life and death ==
Ali was married to Nancy Wong. In 1996, she published "S.M. Ali's world / compiled by Nancy Wong Ali".

Ali died on 17 October 1993 at a Bangkok hospital, at the age of 65.
