= BAMUTA =

National Music Council
- Baraza la Muziki la Taifa

Agency overview
- Formed: 1974
- Dissolved: 1984
- Superseding agency: Department of Lifelong Education, Ministry of Arts and Culture
- Jurisdiction: Tanzania Republic
- Parent agency: Ministry of Arts and Culture

Baraza la Muziki la Taifa (BAMUTA; Swahili for "National Music Council") was a national council created in 1974 by the government of the newly independent Tanzania. Its purpose was to regulate the music business in the country, in the context of a wider programme intended to create a solidified national identity. This, in turn, was a crucial element in Ujamaa, President Julius Nyerere's version of african socialism. Similar institutions were founded to rule over other aspects of the nation's culture, including the nationwide adoption of Swahili language (promoted by Baraza la Kiswahili la Taifa) and the development of Tanzanian art (Baraza la Sanaa la Taifa) (BASATA). The overall idea was to build a new popular culture for the workers and peasants of the country, free from the heritage of colonialism and bourgeoisie culture.

BAMUTA was responsible for the establishment of national music policies, which sought to control musical imports and issued disco and club licenses. BAMUTA called for strict government planning as well as control over the popular music in Tanzania. For example, import of foreign music was generally banned with the exception of music from Zaire.

Under such restriction, and due to government promotion of musical creativity, many bands formed and new African music styles emerged, most notably in the muziki wa dansi (dance music) business.

In 1984, BAMUTA was merged into BASATA.
