= Taasisi ya Taaluma za Kiswahili =

Tanzanian university institution

Taasisi ya Taaluma za Kiswahili (Institute of Kiswahili Studies), known by its acronym TATAKI, is a research body dedicated to the research of the Kiswahili language and literature at the University of Dar es Salaam in Tanzania.

== History ==
The institute was founded as the Interterritorial Language Committee in 1930 under British colonial rule in East Africa tasked with creating a standardized form of the language from 17 dialects. The Kiunguja dialect spoken in Zanzibar was chosen as the base. The committee was also involved in the standardizing spelling as well as coining new words.

The committee was reorganized into a purely academic institution as Taasisi ya Uchunguzi wa Kiswahili (TUKI) (Institute of Kiswahili Research) in 1964 and integrated into the University of Dar es Salaam in 1970. The standardization functions of the committee were transferred to the Baraza la Kiswahili la Taifa.

The institute received its current name in 2009 when it merged with the University of Dar es Salaam's Department of Kiswahili to form a full-fledged school within the university.

== Activities ==
Research activities at the institute is divided into a number of sections - Lexicography, Linguistics, and Literature The Lexicography section of the institute is responsible for creation of dictionaries and terminologies for specialized areas. The first Kiswahili dictionary was compiled in 1981 In addition, specialized dictionaries have been compiled in areas such social science, language and linguistics and science (Physics, Chemistry, Biology).

The Linguistics section conducts research into morphology, phonology, syntax, sociolinguistics and dialectology. The first book on Swahili morphology was published in 1984.

The Literature section conducts research into the oral and written literature in the Kiswahili language.

The institute's purely academic role is in contrast to that of the Baraza la Kiswahili la Taifa (BAKITA), which has a more political role in advocating for Kiswahili as a means of national integration in Tanzania. As such, the responsibility for standardizing the language lies with the latter organization. The institute can propose new vocabulary to respond to emerging needs but only BAKITA can approve usage.
