= Baraza la Sanaa la Taifa =

National arts council in Tanzania

National Arts Council
- Baraza la Sanaa la Taifa

Agency overview
- Formed: 1984
- Superseding agency: Department of Arts and Culture, Ministry of Education of Sports and Culture
- Jurisdiction: Republic of Tanzania
- Parent agency: Ministry of Arts, Culture and Sports

Baraza la Sanaa la Taifa (BASATA; Swahili for National Arts Council) is the national council founded in 1984 by government legislation to serve as a facilitator and promoter of Tanzanian arts, music and theatre arts. BASATA is an official parastatal organization established under the National Arts Council Act No. 23 of 1984. It is a government agency for the revival, promotion and development of the arts in Tanzania.

== History ==
BAMUTA, the National Music Council, established in 1974, was merged into BASATA on the latter's founding.

== See also ==
- Bagamoyo Arts and Cultural Institute
- Tanzania National Archives
- National Museum of Tanzania
