= International Francophonie Day =

International observance

International Francophonie Day Journée internationale de la Francophonie
- Flag of La Francophonie
- Observed by: OIF member states
- Type: International
- Significance: French language; Francophone culture
- Date: March 20
- Next time: March 20, 2027
- Frequency: Annual

International Francophonie Day (French: Journée internationale de la Francophonie) is observed within the International Organisation of La Francophonie's 77 member states every March 20 to celebrate the French language and Francophone culture. There are over 369 million French speakers.

Created in 1988, the date celebrates the signing of the Niamey Convention in Niger on 20 March 1970. The convention established the Agence de Coopération Culturelle et Technique, the precursor to the International Organization of La Francophonie.

According to the Canadian then-minister for La Francophonie Steven Blaney's speech in 2013, the International Francophonie Day is to "celebrate our commitment to not only the French language and the rich and diverse francophone culture but also the values of peace, democracy and respect for human rights that unite all members of the International Organization of La Francophonie".

== See also ==
- Francophone literature
- Organisation internationale de la Francophonie
- UN French Language Day
