= Baraza la Kiswahili la Taifa =

Tanzanian institution responsible with regulating and promoting Kiswahili

National Swahili Council
- Baraza la Kiswahili la Taifa

Agency overview
- Formed: 1967
- Superseding agency: Department of Languages, Ministry of Education
- Jurisdiction: Tanzania Republic
- Agency executive: Consolata Mushi, Executive Secretary
- Parent agency: Ministry of Education

Baraza la Kiswahili la Taifa (National Swahili Council, abbreviated as BAKITA) is a Tanzanian institution responsible with regulating and promoting the Kiswahili language.

== Background ==
Tanganyika and Zanzibar, the two constituents of modern Tanzania, had come under German colonial rule by the 1880s. The territory was inhabited by a large number of ethnic groups speaking different languages. The German colonial government decided to use Kiswahili as the language of administration after becoming fearful that use of German would introduce the local population to subversive Marxist texts. The British, who took over after the defeat of Germany in World War 1 continued this policy.

Swahili has 17 dialects. The Interterritorial Language Committee, in 1930 under British colonial rule in East Africa, was tasked with creating a standardized form of the language. The Kiunjuga dialect spoken in Zanzibar was chosen as the base. The committee was also involved in standardizing the spelling as well as coining some new words. The committee was reorganized into a purely academic institution as Taasisi ya Uchunguzi wa Kiswahili (TATAKI) in 1964 and integrated into the University of Dar es Salaam in 1970.

Meanwhile, the Tanganyika African National Union, fighting for freedom from colonial rule, had adopted Kiswahili as a language of mass organization and political revolution. After coming to power, Kiswahili was made the national language and was seen as a tool for national integration and social development. Since Taasisi ya Uchunguzi wa Kiswahili had transitioned into a purely academic institution, there was a void with respect to its standardization functions. Baraza la Kiswahili la Taifa was founded to fill this void.

== Foundation and activities ==
BAKITA was founded by a parliamentary act in 1967 as organization dedicated to the development and advocacy of Kiswahili as a means of national integration in Tanzania. Its mission was laid down in this act and further expanded in an amendment passed in 1983. Key activities mandated for the organization include creating a healthy atmosphere for the development of Kiswahili, encouraging use of the language in government and business functions, coordinating activities of other organizations involved with Kiswahili, standardizing the language

BAKITA cooperates with organizations like TATAKI in creation, standardization and dissemination of specialized terminologies. Other institutions can propose new vocabulary to respond to emerging needs but only BAKITA can approve usage. By the end of the 1970s, terminologies had been published in Tafsisru Sanifu, a BAKITA journal, for economics and business, administration and government, mathematics, science, social science and engineering among other fields.

BAKITA coordinates its activities with similar bodies in Kenya and Uganda to aid in the development of Kiswahili.

== See also ==
- Baraza la Sanaa la Taifa (BASATA), the Tanzanian council for art
- Baraza la Muziki la Taifa (BAMUTA), the former Tanzanian council for music
- Chama cha Kiswahili cha Taifa (CHAKITA), its Kenyan counterpart
