= Tozammel Tony Huq =

Bangladeshi-English educationist (1940–2024)

Tozammel Tony Huq MBE
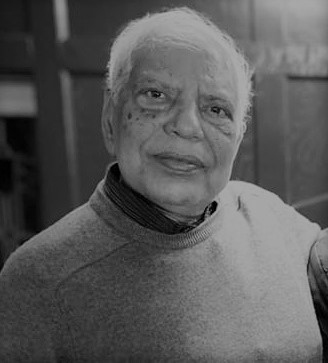

Ambassador of Bangladesh to France
- In office 1988–1991

Personal details
- Born: 1 February 1940 Naogaon, Bengal Province, British India
- Died: 9 May 2024 (aged 84) Birmingham, England
- Education: Rajshahi University

Tozammel “Tony” Huq MBE (1 February 1940 – 9 May 2024) was a Bangladeshi-English educationist, community worker and activist based in Birmingham. During his working life he served as a teacher, an ambassador of Bangladesh to France and a special adviser for UNESCO.

== Early life and education ==
Tozammel Huq was born on 1 February 1940 to middle-class parents in Naogaon, Bengal Province. He attended Naogaon High School and Rajshahi Government College, took B.A. (Honours) and M.A. (Honours) degrees in economics from Rajshahi University and was for a while a student of Dhaka University. His involvement in student politics led to his arrest and a six-month period of imprisonment under the regime of Ayub Khan, temporarily halting his student career.

Huq then spent a year in Canada, pursuing doctoral studies in law at McGill University, Montreal, before moving to London. While in Canada he adopted the name Tony, which from then on remained his preferred appellation.

In London, Huq enrolled as a law student at the Inner Temple. Induced by impecunity to take up paid employment he applied for a supply teaching job in Birmingham. Unexpectedly this led to his full-time engagement in the education sector and the ultimate abandonment of his aspiration to become a barrister.

== Professional life ==
Huq worked at Ladypool Junior School in south Birmingham for twenty-two years, latterly as its head teacher, for which service he was made a Member of the Order of the British Empire in 1986. For a number of years, while still a teacher, he co-presented (with Suman Kang) the weekly Asian music programme "Geet Mala" on Birmingham Independent Local Radio station BRMB.

Huq then served as the Ambassador of Bangladesh to France and Spain from 1988 to 1991. After a short interlude as education adviser for Birmingham Education Department he was recruited by UNESCO as its Senior Special Adviser for Asia and the Pacific, based in Paris, a job which he carried out from 1993 to 2001.

After he had retired from public office, Huq served for a time as a Non-Executive Director and Board Member of Queen Elizabeth Hospital Trust, Birmingham.

== Other work ==
A committed socialist, Huq was constantly involved in campaigns for workers’ rights and betterment. In Birmingham, he founded the Bangladesh Workers’ Association and the Bangladesh Centre. He had links with many organizations opposed to racism and social deprivation and enjoyed close relations with Labour Members of Parliament in Birmingham.

While at UNESCO, Huq played a major role in establishing International Mother Language Day (celebrated on 21 February each year).

Huq was a visiting lecturer in International Relations at the University of Birmingham and an Honorary Research Fellow of Warwick University. He received an honorary doctorate from the University of Birmingham in 2002.

== Death ==
Huq died on 9 May 2024, at the age of 84 in Birmingham.

== Honours ==
- 1986 – Member of the Honourable Order of the British Empire.
- 2002 – Doctor honoris causa of the University of Birmingham.
