= Universal Declaration of Linguistic Rights =

1996 document to support linguistic rights

The Universal Declaration of Linguistic Rights (known also as the Barcelona Declaration) is a document signed by the International PEN Club, and several non-governmental organizations in 1996 to support linguistic rights, especially those of endangered languages. The document was adopted at the conclusion of the World Conference on Linguistic Rights held 6–9 June 1996 in Barcelona, Spain. It was also presented to the UNESCO Director General in 1996 but the Declaration has not gained formal approval from UNESCO.

== History ==
=== Precursors ===
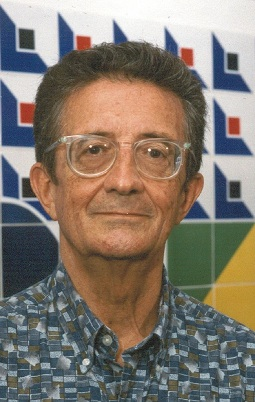
Francisco Gomes de Matos

Although the 1948 Universal Declaration of Human Rights (UDHR) has language as one of its categories for equal rights, it does not explicitly list and elaborate on linguistic rights. Even with declarations and rules on protecting specific languages and their rights, there was no binding document at that time that referred to all the languages or to world linguistic rights. As such, there have been attempts to fill this gap by expanding on the importance of linguistic rights in the global scene.

In addition, the Universal Declaration of Linguistic Rights (UDLR) holds regards to several policies that motivated the respect of linguistic rights. Some of the documents include:

- Declaration on the Rights of Persons belonging to National, Ethnic, Religious and Linguistic Minorities
- European Convention on Human Rights
- European Charter for Regional or Minority Languages
- Framework Convention for the Protection of National Minorities
- International Covenant on Civil and Political Rights
- Universal Declaration of the Collective Rights of Peoples

The idea of a Declaration was first proposed in 1984, where a Brazilian by the name of Francisco Gomes de Matos introduced to the International Federation of Modern Language Teachers (FIPLV), a plea for a Universal Declaration of Linguistic Rights. He listed some of the principal linguistic rights, together with their educational implications.

One of the most significant motivations stemmed from the 12th Seminar of the International Association for the Development of Intercultural Communication of 1987, held in Recife, Brazil, which also recommended the introduction of a declaration for linguistic rights. The Seminar then adopted a preliminary declaration that indexed some fundamental types of linguistic rights.

=== Drafting ===
The main objective of penning a Declaration was to define equality in linguistic rights, regardless of differences in political or territorial statuses. It serves to promote international commitment in respecting the rights of linguistic groups, especially those of historicity, as well as individuals who do not reside within their native communities.

As such, the UDLR does not distinguish among official, non-official, majority, local, regional, and minority languages. There was much complexity tied to the drafting process because it was not easy to come up with equal measures, definitions and reasons, especially since it required an international consensus. For instance, one of the most common problems lie in clarifying concepts and their terminologies. Subsequently, follow-up meetings and feedback sessions were held in Paris, Portugal and Frankfurt.

In 1990, the FIPLV drafted a working document. In August 1991, the FIPLV organised a workshop in Pécs, Hungary. It was there that they managed to consolidate an agenda on fundamental principles for a UDLR. The Declaration was also discussed in December 1993, during a session of the Translations and Linguistic Rights Commission of the International PEN.

At the beginning of 1994, a team was rooted to facilitate the process of writing the official document. About 40 experts from different countries and fields were involved in the first 12 drafts of the Declaration. Progressively, there were continuous efforts in revising and improving the Declaration as people contributed ideas to be included in it.

=== Adoption ===
It was on 6 June 1996, during the World Conference on Linguistic Rights in Barcelona, Spain, that the Declaration was acknowledged. The Conference, which was an initiative of the Translations and Linguistic Rights Commission of the International PEN Club and the CIEMEN (Escarre International Center for Ethnic Minorities and the Nations), comprised 61 NGOs, 41 PEN Centers and 40 experts. The document was signed and presented to a representative of the UNESCO Director General. However, this does not mean that the Declaration has gained approval.

In the same year, the Declaration was published in Catalan, English, French and Spanish. It was later translated into other languages, some of which include Galician, Basque, Bulgarian, Hungarian, Russian, Portuguese, Italian, Nynorsk, Sardinian.

Even so, there have been continuous efforts to bring the Declaration through as UNESCO did not officially endorse the UDLR at its General Conference in 1996, and also in subsequent years, although they morally supported it.

As a result, a Follow-up Committee of the Universal Declaration of Linguistic Rights (FCUDLR) was created by the World Conference on Linguistic Rights. The FCUDLR is also represented by the CIEMEN, which is a non-profit and non-government organisation. The main objectives of having a follow-up committee was to 1) garner support, especially from international bodies, so as to lend weight to the Declaration and see it through to UNESCO, 2) to maintain contact with UNESCO and take into account the many viewpoints of its delegates, and 3) to spread awareness of the UDLR and establish a web of support.

Consequently, the committee started a Scientific Council consisting of professionals in Linguistic Law. The duty of the council is to update and improve the Declaration from time to time by gathering suggestions from those who are keen on the issue of linguistic rights.

The following summarises the progress of the UDLR:

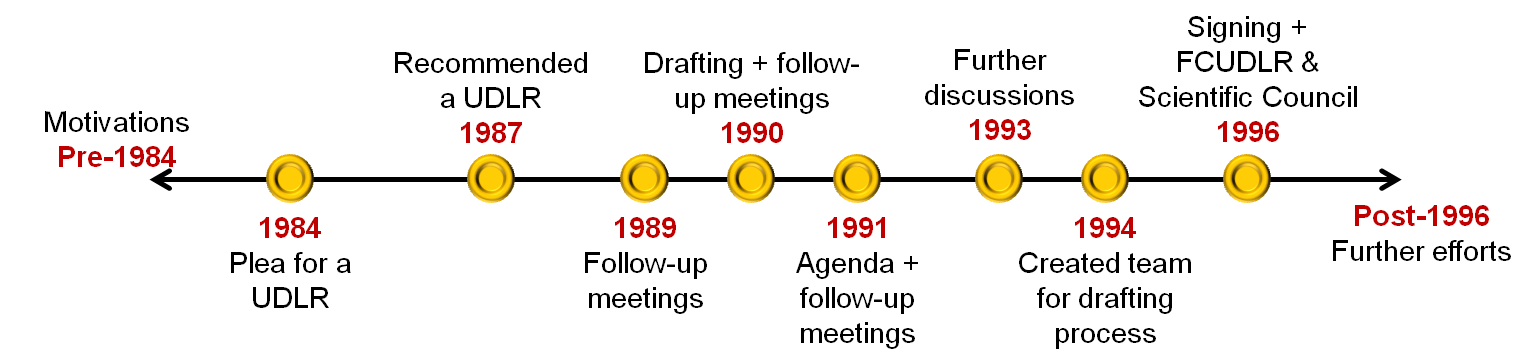

== Contents and Themes ==
=== Structure ===
The preamble of the Declaration provides six reasons underlying the motivations to promote the stated principles.

To ensure clarity in applicability across diverse linguistic environments, the declaration has included a preliminary title that addresses the definitions of concepts used in its articles (Articles 1–6). Title One (Articles 7–14) lists general principles asserting equal linguistic rights for language communities and for the individual. Besides the main principles, the second title delves into an overall linguistic régime and is further divided into 6 sections. Section 1 (Articles 15–22) addresses language usage related to public administration and official bodies. Section 2 (Articles 23–30) touches on linguistic rights involving educational fields. Section 3 (Articles 31–34) defines linguistic rights concerning naming, while Section 4 (Articles 35–40) asserts the entitlement of language groups to mass media resources and new technologies. Section 5 (Articles 41–46) outlines the rights related to cultural artifacts. The last section of the second title, Section 6 (Article 47–52), touches on the individual or language group's rights in the socioeconomic sphere.

The Additional Dispositions call for the obligation of public powers to take measures ensuring the application of these rights and to inform other related bodies of these proclamations. As for the Final Dispositions, the founding of a Council of the Languages within the United Nations Organization is put forth, as well as the creation of a World Commission for Linguistic Rights, which is to be an unofficial, consultative council composed of experts in non-governmental organizations and those in the field of linguistic law.

=== Opening Article ===
1. This Declaration considers as a language community any human society established historically in a particular territorial space, whether this space be recognized or not, which identifies itself as a people and has developed a common language as a natural means of communication and cultural cohesion among its members. The term language specific to a territory refers to the language of the community historically established in such a space.

== Reactions ==
One of the comments made was on the idealistic nature of the Declaration. As the Declaration considers all languages equal, it rejects terms such as "official", "regional" or "minority" languages and strongly advocates the full use of all historic community languages.

Drawing from the articles pertaining to the educational issues (Articles 25, 26 and 30), it is stated that the education system should fully support the development of their community languages and other languages they wish to know in schools to the point of fluency and capability to use it in all social situations. In addition, research on language and culture of language communities is to be done at the university level. It has been argued that the "rights" stated in those articles will remain the privilege of powerful language communities. The reason is that since the Declaration requires authorities to issue sanctions in the event of violation of the proclaimed rights, doubts have arisen regarding the likelihood of any government adopting the document. Many governmental groups (other than the regional authorities in Spain such as Catalonia, Menorca and Basque) in most countries find it hard to reconcile these fundamental principles of the Declaration with their current language policies and practices. There is a need to balance between regulations imposed by governments and the protection of the rights of the people in different language communities. Considerations such as acknowledging the primary human rights of minority peoples (e.g. issues of physical survival) are, instead, regarded as more dire than an issue like linguistic rights. Linguistic rights will hence be ignored before primary human rights can be properly attended to. Furthermore, the cost involved in executing sanctions is another cause of concern. The main issue, however, is the fact that the article is not legally binding and duty-holders are never specified.

Other responses include the issue that more rights are given to "language communities" in the Declaration. In the context of education, it is observed that other than language communities (equivalent to "national territorially based minorities"), those who do not fit under this category will have to "assimilate", as having the right to education in the language of the territory does not necessarily equate to having the right to an education in one's own language.

== Developments ==
=== Efforts in Ratification ===
The Declaration is not constitutional and has not been ratified by the UN General Assembly, unlike the Universal Declaration of Human Rights. Despite the Follow-up Committee's publication of the text in 1998, which was backed by letters of support from world leaders, UNESCO has not ratified the document. On 19 April 2002, CIEMEN and International PEN convoked a summit during the World Congress on Language Policies in Barcelona. The FIPLV suggested that it would modify the Declaration so that it would be accepted and implemented. There were also further efforts to foster support for the UDLR through proposals and conferences in 2003.

Since 2008, CIEMEN has been lobbying to place linguistic rights on the agenda of the states that are currently members of the United Nations Human Rights Council (UNHRC). Despite the positive responses to the document, member states perceived a lack of consensus on the matter and did not wish to be among the first to adopt the proposal. An event organised in Geneva in 2008, entitled Linguistic Rights to enhance Human Rights, which coincided with the Eighth Session of the UNHRC, aimed to garner support for a draft resolution for the UDLR to be presented at the September session of the UNHRC conference. Ambassadors from Mexico, Bolivia, Chile, Armenia and Nigeria expressed their support in a series of interviews. Later in September, the Advisory Committee of the UNHRC was called upon to take steps to present a proposal, in hopes that the UDLR could be added to the Universal Declaration of Human Rights.

=== Girona Manifesto ===
The Girona Manifesto was developed by International PEN's Translation and Linguistic Rights in May 2011 to commemorate the fifteenth anniversary of the Declaration. The Girona Manifesto is an updated version that condenses the primary principles of the UDLR to aid its implementation. In September 2011, the manifesto was ratified by the International PEN Assembly of Delegates at the 77th Congress.

The content of the manifesto is based on the Universal Declaration's 10 central principles. In contrast to the comprehensive and complex declaration which plays an important role in the field of linguistics and politics, the manifesto is laid out in a concise and practical way, intended to be 'translated and disseminated as a tool to defend linguistic diversity around the world'. The goal is to bring attention to the issue of language rights back to the international agenda.

It is thought to be an important step toward protecting and promoting all of the world's languages, including the ones at risk of extinction. As John Ralston Saul, President of International PEN, mentioned, "[It] could give us a clear public document with which to defend and advance languages with smaller populations as well as endangered languages".

On 5 March 2012, the Girona Manifesto and its translated versions were presented at an event organized by Catalan PEN Centre. It was held at the Palau de la Generalitat, Barcelona. The manifesto has been translated in 32 languages to date.

==== Text of the Girona Manifesto on Linguistic Rights ====
1. Linguistic diversity is a world heritage that must be valued and protected.
2. Respect for all languages and cultures is fundamental to the process of constructing and maintaining dialogue and peace in the world.
3. All individuals learn to speak in the heart of a community that gives them life, language, culture and identity.
4. Different languages and different ways of speaking are not only means of communication; they are also the milieu in which humans grow and cultures are built.
5. Every linguistic community has the right for its language to be used as an official language in its territory.
6. School instruction must contribute to the prestige of the language spoken by the linguistic community of the territory.
7. It is desirable for citizens to have a general knowledge of various languages, because it favours empathy and intellectual openness, and contributes to a deeper knowledge of one's own tongue.
8. The translation of texts, especially the great works of various cultures, represents a very important element in the necessary process of greater understanding and respect among human beings.
9. The media is a privileged loudspeaker for making linguistic diversity work and for competently and rigorously increasing its prestige.
10. The right to use and protect one's own language must be recognized by the United Nations as one of the fundamental human rights.

=== Donostia Protocol ===
In 2016, a group of NGOs including some UDLR initiators, and led by Kontseilua, the Council of Basque Social Organisations, has adopted Donostia Protocol to Ensure Language Rights, which refers to UDLR as a source of inspiration.

== Supporters ==
To date, the UDLR has received the support of many international personalities, some of whom have included: Nelson Mandela, Mangosuthu Gatsha Buthelezi, Ronald Harwood, Homero Aridjis, Noam Chomsky, José Ramos-Horta, Dalai Lama, Dr. M. Aram, Desmond Tutu, László Tőkés, Ricardo María Carles Gordó, Adolfo Pérez Esquivel, José Carreras, Seamus Heaney, Ngũgĩ wa Thiong'o, Shimon Peres, Judit Mascó, Peter Gabriel, Jennifer Clement and Joan Oró.

== See also ==
- Anti-Hindi agitations of Tamil Nadu
- European Charter for Regional or Minority Languages
- Guangzhou Television Cantonese controversy
- International Mother Language Day
- Language policy
- Language revitalization
- Language Rights Support Program
- Language death
- Language movement
- Linguistic rights
- Minority language
- Universal Declaration of Human Rights
