= Academia Angolana de Letras =

Academia Angolana de Letras (ALL)
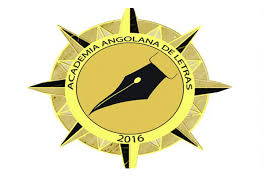
- Formation: 28 March 2016; 10 years ago
- Type: Literary Association
- Headquarters: Luanda
- Official language: Portuguese and other Angolan national languages
- President: Paulo de Carvalho

The Academia Angolana de Letras or the Angolan Academy of Letters (ALL) is a private association without lucrative ends and of scientific and cultural nature. It is also a literary institution that strives towards publishing literary works of great historical and national importance as well as takes responsibility for the regulation of the Angolan variety of the Portuguese language. The ALL is considered to be strategically important for the future and dissemination of the Portuguese language, as stated by the Portuguese president Marcelo Rebelo de Sousa.

== Goals ==
The AAL has as its main goals to promote the teaching, study and fostering of the Portuguese language and of the Angolan National Bantu Languages, as well as to better deepen the connection between all these languages.

== History ==
The ALL constitutive acts were published in the Angolan Republic Official Diary N. 957 of 28 March 2016 and had as founding members the Angolan writers Henrique Lopes Guerra, António Botelho de Vasconcelos e Boaventura Silva Cardoso, having as its patron the first president of Angola President of the Republic of Angola, Agostinho Neto. The first elected president of the ALL was Boaventura Silva Cardoso, who exerted his mandate from 2016 to 2020. He was succeeded in the presidency of ALL by Paulo de Carvalho.

== Members ==
The ALL is constituted by 43 members (or immortals), having, at its founding, all the living members of the Angolan Union of Writers. At the date of its formation, only 2 of its members were women - – Maria Eugénia Neto and Irene Guerra Marques —, with Fátima Viegas later occupying a chair. The number 43 chair belongs exclusively to Agostinho Neto and it shall always remain vacant.
