= Chama cha Kiswahili cha Taifa =

Chama cha Kiswahili cha Taifa (National Kiswahili Association, abbreviated as CHAKITA) is a Kenyan institution founded in 1998 responsible for the promotion of the Swahili language in Kenya. The Founding Chair is Prof. Kimani Njogu, a graduate of Yale University's department of Linguistics.

Key activities of CHAKITA are directing research into Kiswahili language and literature in coordination with academic institutions and to develop Kiswahili so that it can be used as a means of national development. The institution sees use of indigenous languages in governance as key to socio-economic development. The Association is key in influencing policies on culture and languages in Kenya and was instrumental in ensuring that Kiswahili was entrenched in the Constitution of Kenya. In 2000, the Kenyan parliament passed a CHAKITA sponsored bill to make Kiswahili a national language and to make its teaching compulsory in schools. Professor Clara Momanyi, Secretary of CHAKITA, was tasked with translation of the new Constitution of Kenya, which was approved in the 2010 referendum.

In keeping with its view of the need for development of indigenous languages for national integration and development, CHAKITA has also supported increased government promotion of other Kenyan languages. The 2000 bill also called for the creation of 'Baraza la Lugha la Taifa' (National Languages Council), to develop other local languages.

The vision of CHAKITA is to have the East African region use Kiswahili effectively in all sectors of the economy. The mission of CHAKITA is to contribute in the development of Kiswahili in the region through advocacy as well as publishing, teaching, conferences, translations and linkages with key stakeholders. CHAKITA has played a key in fostering closer ties and coordinating its activities with similar Kiswahili promotion bodies such as BAKITA in Tanzania and Uganda to aid in the development of Kiswahili.

CHAKITA is managed by an Executive Committee composed of a Chairperson, Vice Chair, Secretary, Treasurer, and Assistant Treasurer. A number of technical committees support the work of the association.

== See also ==
- Baraza la Kiswahili la Taifa (BAKITA), its Tanzanian counterpart
