= International Mother Language Day =

Annual observance to promote awareness of linguistic and cultural diversity

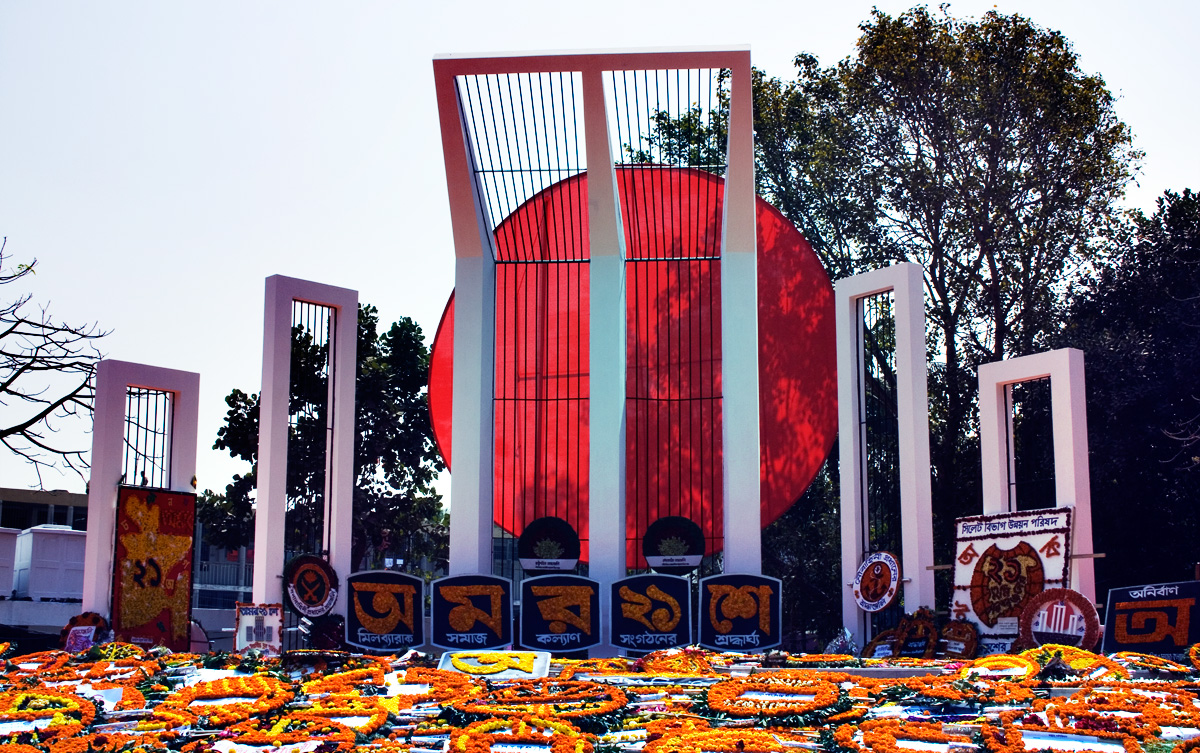
- Shaheed Minar, Dhaka (Martyr Monument) commemorates the 21 February 1952 Bengali language movement demonstration.
- Official name: International Mother Language Day (IMLD)
- Observed by: United Nations
- Liturgical color: Black
- Type: International
- Significance: Promotes the preservation and protection of all languages
- Date: 21 February
- Frequency: Annual
- First time: 21 February 1952 (74 years ago); 21 February 1972 (Officially); 21 February 2000 (Internationally)

International Mother Language Day is a worldwide annual observance held on 21 February to promote awareness of linguistic and cultural diversity and to promote multilingualism. First announced by UNESCO on 17 November 1999, it was formally recognized by the United Nations General Assembly with the adoption of UN resolution 56/262 in 2002.

Mother Language Day is part of a broader initiative "to promote the preservation and protection of all languages used by people of the world" as adopted by the UN General Assembly on 16 May 2007 in UN resolution 61/266, which also established 2008 as the International Year of Languages. The idea to celebrate International Mother Language Day was the initiative of Bangladesh.

In Bangladesh, 21 February 1952 is the anniversary of the day when the Bengalis of the then-Pakistani province of East Bengal (which is now the independent state of Bangladesh) fought for recognition of their Bengali language as an official central state language instead of a provincial language. The day is also observed by Indian Bengalis in the states of West Bengal, Assam, Jharkhand, and Tripura, as well as in the union territory of the Andaman and Nicobar Islands and diaspora communities.

== History ==
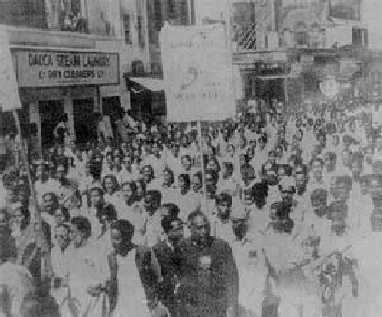
Procession march held on 21 February 1952 in Dhaka

21 February was declared to be International Mother Language Day by UNESCO on 17 November 1999. It has been observed throughout the world since 21 February 2000. The declaration came up in tribute to the Language Movement done by the Bangladeshis (then the East Pakistanis).

When Pakistan was created in 1947, it had two geographically separate parts: East Pakistan (currently known as Bangladesh) and West Pakistan (currently known as Pakistan). The two parts were very different from each other in the sense of culture and language, and were also separated by India in between.

In 1948, the government of Pakistan declared Urdu to be the sole national language of Pakistan, even though Bengali, or Bangla, was spoken by the majority of people combining East Pakistan and West Pakistan. The East Pakistan people protested since the majority of the population was from East Pakistan and their mother language was Bangla. They demanded Bangla to be at least one of the national languages, in addition to Urdu. The demand was raised first by Dhirendranath Datta from East Pakistan on 23 February 1948, in the Constituent Assembly of Pakistan.

To demolish the protest, the government of Pakistan outlawed public meetings and rallies. The students of the University of Dhaka, with the support of the public, arranged massive rallies and meetings. On 21 February 1952, police opened fire on rallies. Abdus Salam, Abul Barkat, Rafiq Uddin Ahmed, Abdul Jabbar, and Shafiur Rahman died, with hundreds of others injured. This was a rare incident in history where people sacrificed their lives for their mother tongue.

Since then, Bangladeshis celebrate the International Mother Language Day as one of their tragic days. They visit the Shaheed Minar, a monument built in memory of the martyrs, and its replicas to express their deep sorrow, respect. and gratitude to them.

International Mother Language Day is a national holiday in Bangladesh. The resolution was suggested by Rafiqul Islam and Abdus Salam, Bengalis living in Vancouver, Canada. They wrote a letter to Kofi Annan on 9 January 1998 asking him to take a step to save the world's languages from extinction by declaring an International Mother Language Day. Rafiq proposed the date as 21 February to commemorate the 1952 killings in Dhaka during the Language Movement.

Languages are the most powerful instruments of preserving and developing our tangible and intangible heritage. All moves to promote the dissemination of mother tongues will serve not only to encourage linguistic diversity and multilingual education but also to develop fuller awareness of linguistic and cultural traditions throughout the world and to inspire solidarity based on understanding, tolerance and dialogue.

— From the United Nations International Mother Language Day microsite

Rafiqul Islam's proposal was introduced in the Bangladesh Parliament, and in due course (at the behest of Prime Minister Sheikh Hasina), a formal proposal was submitted to UNESCO by the Government of Bangladesh. The process of shepherding the proposal through UNESCO's regulatory system was undertaken by Syed Muazzem Ali, then Bangladesh ambassador to France and Permanent Representative to UNESCO, and Tozammel Tony Huq, his predecessor, who was then a Special Adviser to UNESCO Secretary General Federico Mayor. Finally, on 17 November 1999, the 30th General Assembly of UNESCO unanimously resolved that "21st February be proclaimed International Mother Language Day throughout the world to commemorate the martyrs who sacrificed their lives on this very day in 1952."

== Timeline ==
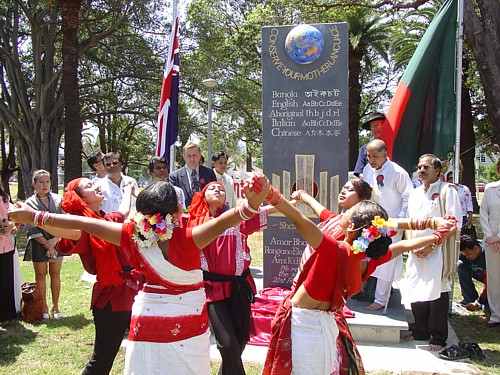
Dedication of the International Mother Language Day Monument in Ashfield Park, Sydney, 19 February 2006

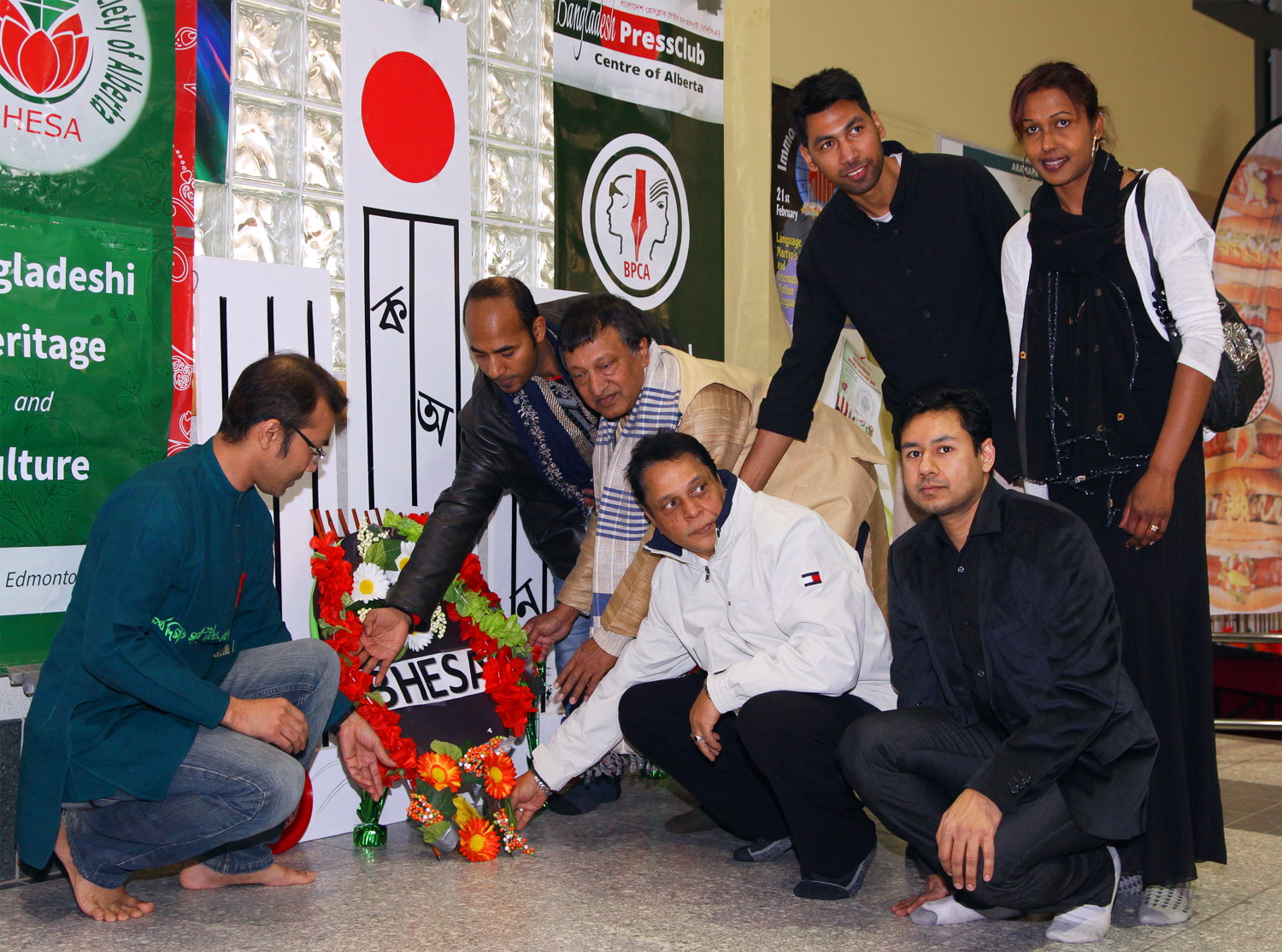
Commemorating IMLD in Canada

- 1952: Bengali language movement
- 1955: Language Movement Day first observed in Bangladesh
- 1999: UNESCO proclaims 21 February (Ekushey February) as International Mother Language Day
- 2000: Inaugural celebration of International Mother Language Day
- 2002: Linguistic-diversity theme, featuring 3,000 endangered languages (motto: In the galaxy of languages, every word is a star.)
- 2004: Children-learning theme; the UNESCO observance included "a unique exhibition of children's exercise books from around the world illustrating the process by which children learn and master the use of written literacy skills in the classroom".
- 2005: Braille and sign languages
- 2006: Annual theme: "Languages and cyberspace"
- 2007: Annual theme: Multilingual education
- 2008: International Year of Languages
- 2009: Annual theme: " Languages matter for communities – the way Forward"
- 2010: International Year for the Rapprochement of Cultures
- 2011: Annual theme: "Information and communication technologies for safeguarding and promotion of languages and linguistic diversity"
- 2012: Mother-tongue instruction and inclusive education
- 2013: Annual theme: "Books for mother tongue education"
- 2014: Annual theme: "Local languages for global citizenship: spotlight on science"
- 2015: Annual theme: "Inclusion in and through education: language counts"
- 2016: Annual theme: "Quality education, language(s) of instruction and learning outcomes"
- 2017: Annual theme: "Towards sustainable futures through multilingual education"
- 2018: Our languages, our assets.
- 2019: International Year of Indigenous Languages
- 2020: Annual theme: "Safeguarding linguistic diversity"
- 2021: Annual theme: "Fostering multilingualism for inclusion in education and society"
- 2022: Annual theme: "Using technology for multilingual learning: Challenges and opportunities"
- 2023: Annual theme: "Multilingual education: A necessity to transform education"
- 2024: Annual theme: "Multilingual education - a pillar of learning and intergenerational learning"
- 2025: Annual theme: "Silver Jubilee Celebration of International Mother Language Day"
- 2026: Annual theme: "Youth voices on multilingual education"

== Observances ==
UNESCO chooses a theme for each International Mother Language Day and sponsors related events at its Paris headquarters. In 2008, the International Year of Languages began on International Mother Language Day. It is celebrated in Chile, Russia, the Philippines, Egypt, and Canada.

=== Bangladesh ===
Procession toward Central Shaheed Minar at 2023 International Mother Language Day

Bangladeshis celebrate International Mother Language Day by placing flowers at the Martyrs' Monument and its replicas. A public holiday in the country since 1953, it is also known as Shohid Dibôsh (Martyr Day). On 17 November 1999, the UNESCO General Conference recognized 21 February as International Mother Language Day. Bangladeshis organize social gatherings honoring their language and culture, hold literary competitions, draw alpana on the roads, eat festive meals, and listen to songs. Bangla Academy arranges Ekushey Book Fair in Dhaka for the whole month of February.

=== Canada ===
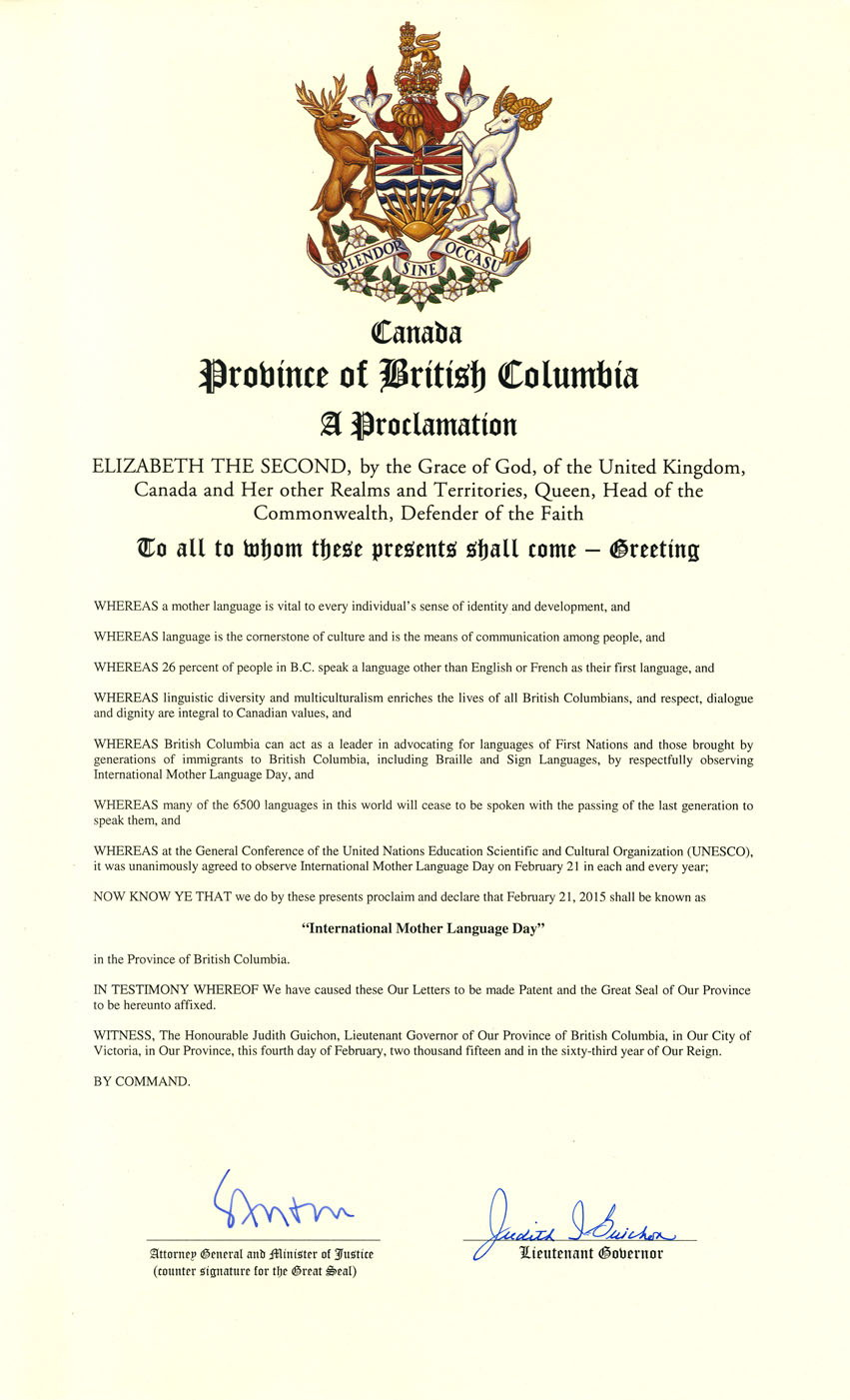
IMLD British Columbia proclamation

International Mother Language Day was introduced to the Parliament of Canada for recognition by Matthew Kellway on 5 February 2014 as a private member's bill, C-573; however, it was never debated and failed to become law.

In 2015, British Columbia and Manitoba issued proclamations observing International Mother Language Day on 21 February. Edmonton observed International Mother Language Day on 21 February 2017. Edmonton Ekushey was observed by Bangladesh Heritage & Ethnic Society and Diverse Edmonton with due respect in Edmonton on 23 February 2020.

In December 2021, Independent Senators Group member Mobina Jaffer introduced and sponsored Bill S-214, An Act to establish International Mother Language Day, in the Senate. In March 2022, Ken Hardie sponsored Bill S-214 in the House of Commons, and it passed into law on 15 June 2022.

=== India ===
As part of the Digital India initiative, digitized content will be made available in the country's 22 scheduled languages and extended to India's other 234 recognized languages. Digitization began in June 2016 through the Bharatavani Project at the Central Institute of Indian Languages in Mysore, and by February 2017 content in 60 Indian languages had been made available free of charge.

=== United States ===
The Mother Tongue Film Festival in Washington, D.C., has been held since 2017 to coincide with Mother Languages Day.

=== United Kingdom ===
A replica of Dhaka's Shaheed Minar was built in London in 1999 in Altab Ali Park, Whitechapel. Members of the community come here to mark International Mother Language Day by laying wreaths and singing revolutionary songs.

There is also a Shaheed Minar replica in Westwood, Greater Manchester. Community members come from across North England to mark International Mother Language Day at the monument.

There is also an IMLM at Grangemoor Park in Cardiff. Its opening ceremony was held on 21 February 2019.

== Awards ==
=== Linguapax Prize ===
The Linguapax Prize is awarded annually on IMLD by the Linguapax Institute in Barcelona. The prize recognizes outstanding achievement in the preservation of linguistic diversity, the revitalization of linguistic communities, and the promotion of multilingualism.

=== Ekushey Heritage Award ===
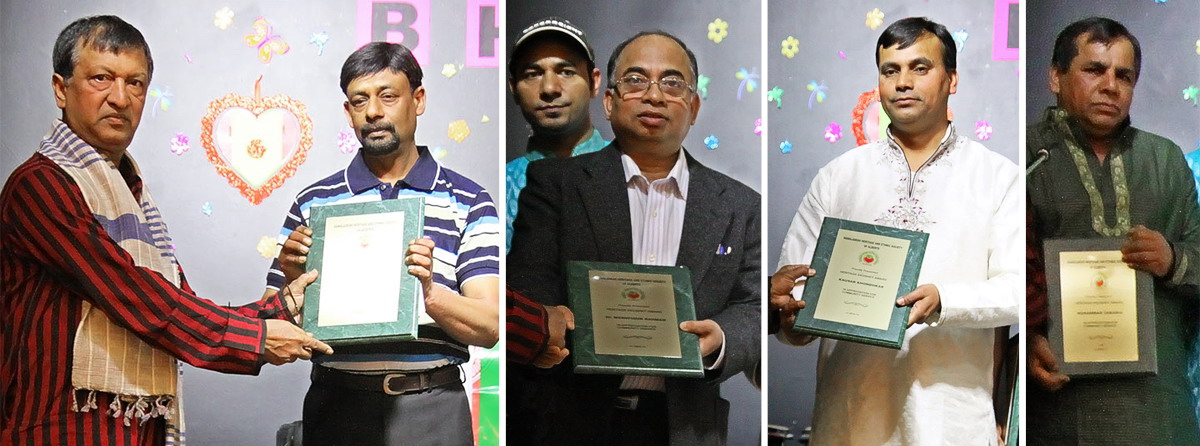
Recipients of the 2015 BHESA Ekushey Heritage Award

The annual Ekushey Heritage Award, introduced in 2014 by the Bangladesh Heritage and Ethnic Society of Alberta (BHESA), recognizes outstanding achievement in fields such as education, social work, and community service. The award is announced on International Mother Language Day.

=== Ekushey Youth Award ===
The Ekushey Youth Award, introduced in 2015 by Alberta's Mahinur Jahid Memorial Foundation (MJMF) and announced on IMLD, is awarded annually to recipients who inspire youth in the fields of education, sports, youth activities, literature, and community service. The award is open to Alberta residents.

== Gallery ==
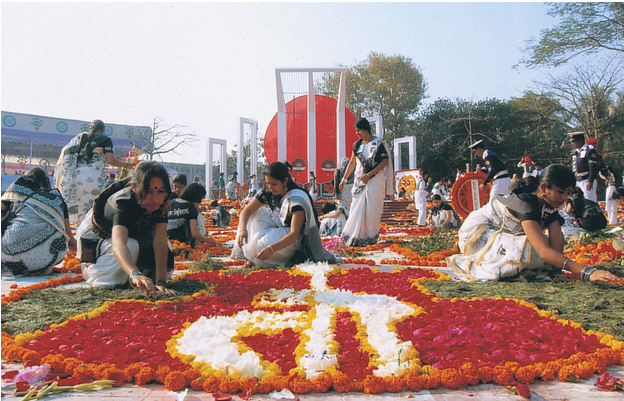
International Mother Language Day Celebration in Dhaka, with the Martyr's Monument in the background

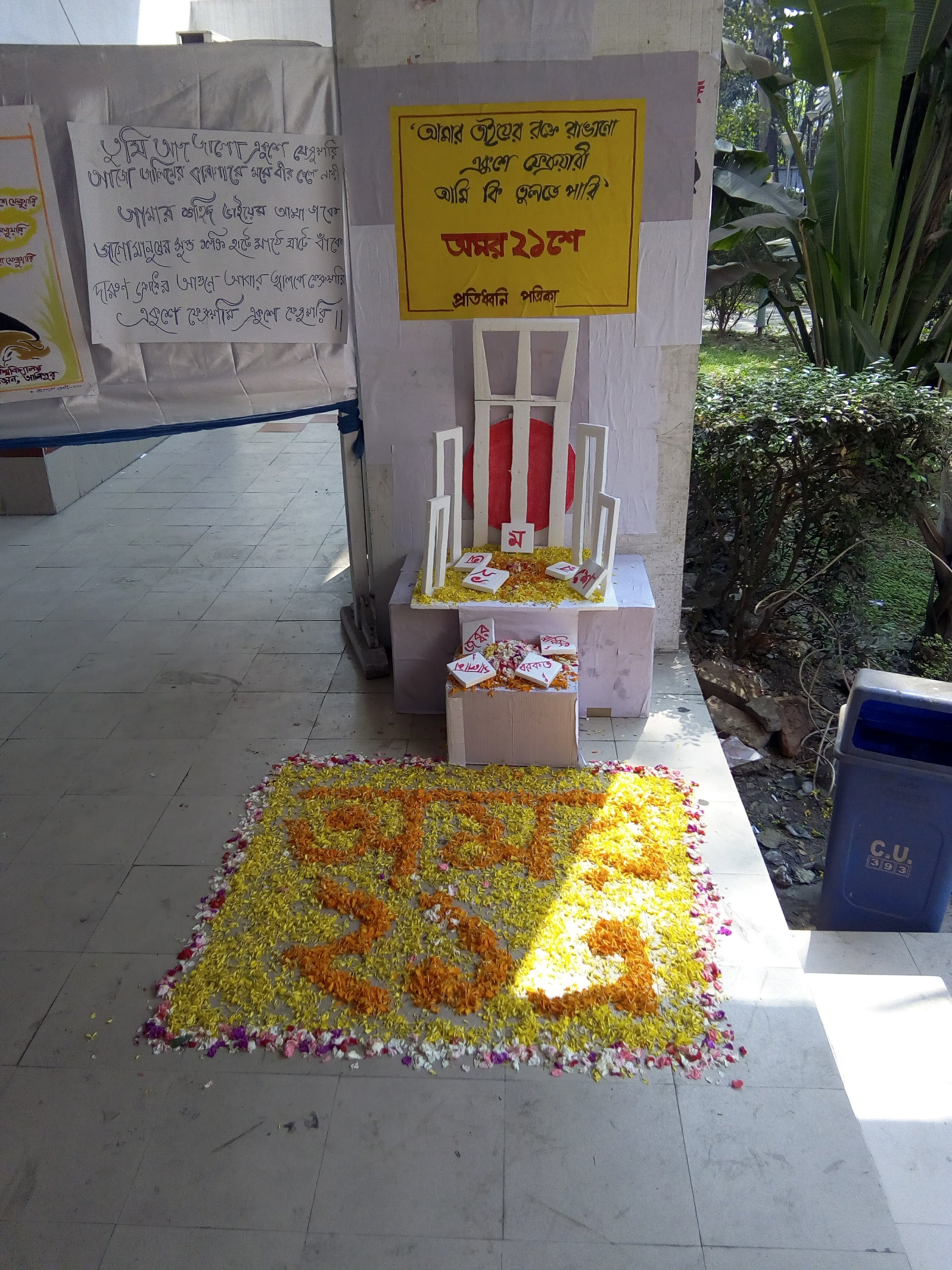
International Mother Language day celebration at the University of Calcutta Alipore campus in 2018

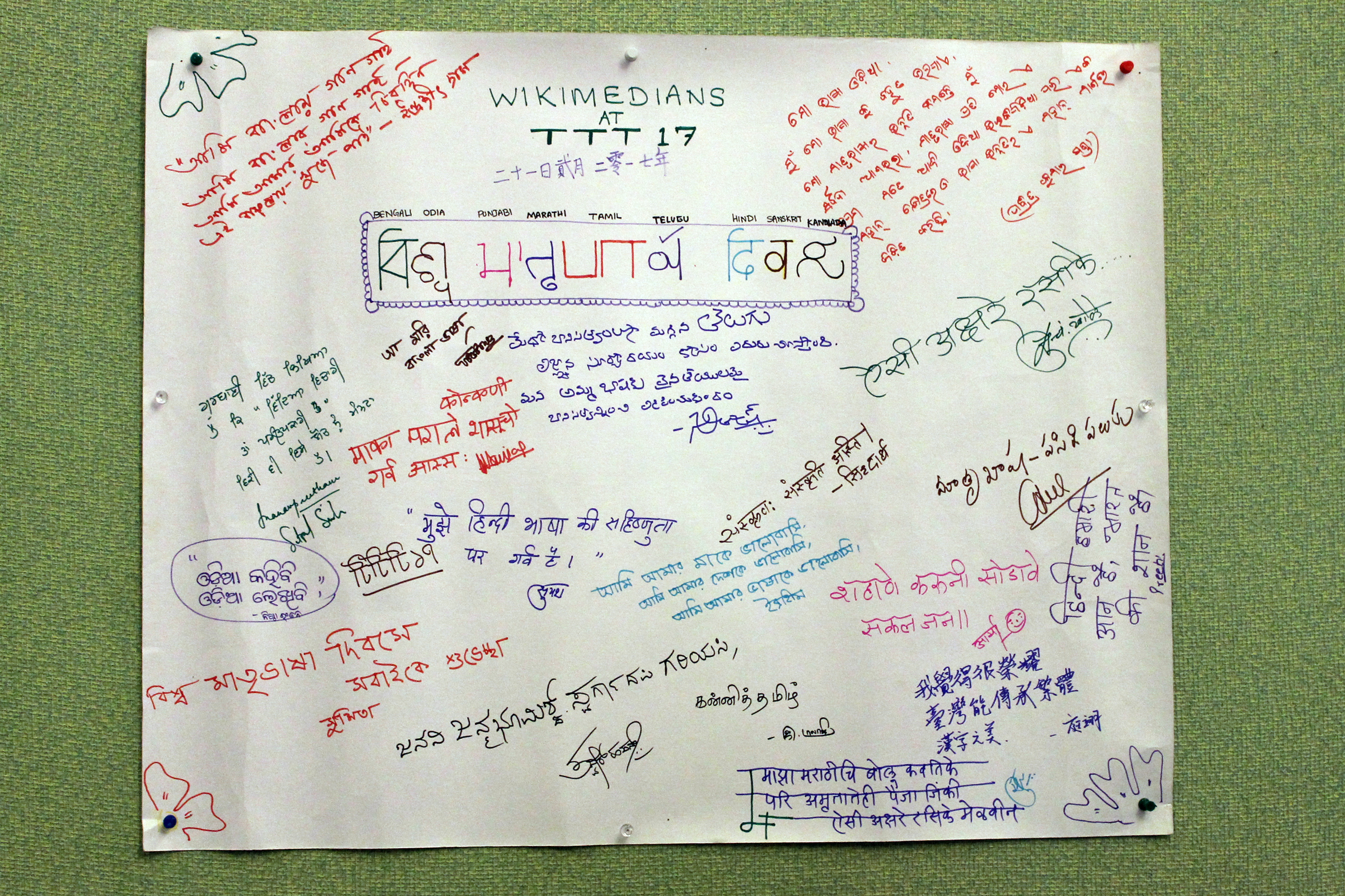
2017 International Mother Language Day celebration in Bangalore

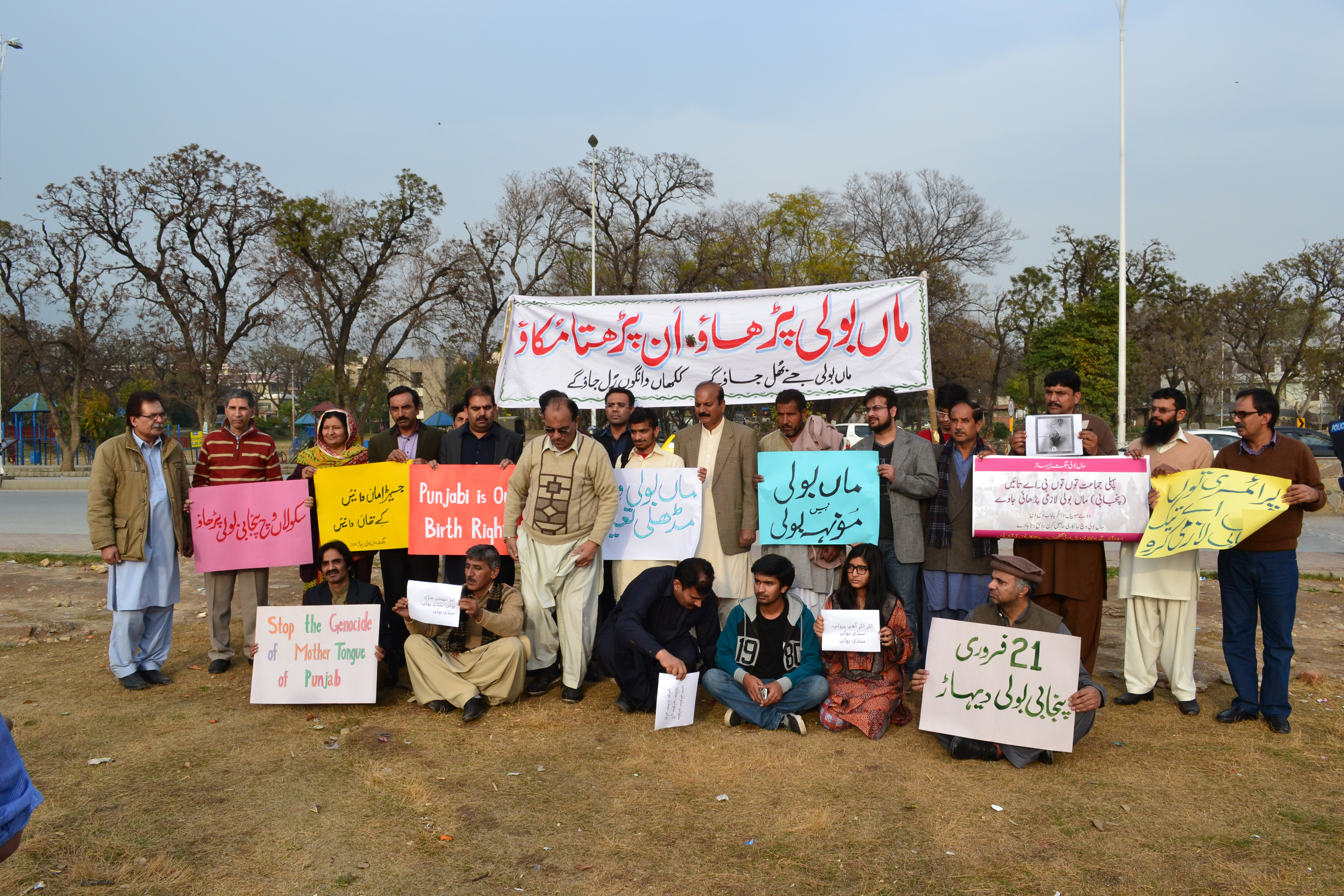
2015 Mother Tongue Day in Islamabad, with demonstrators demanding that Punjabi (the mother tongue of most Pakistanis) be made an official language of Pakistan

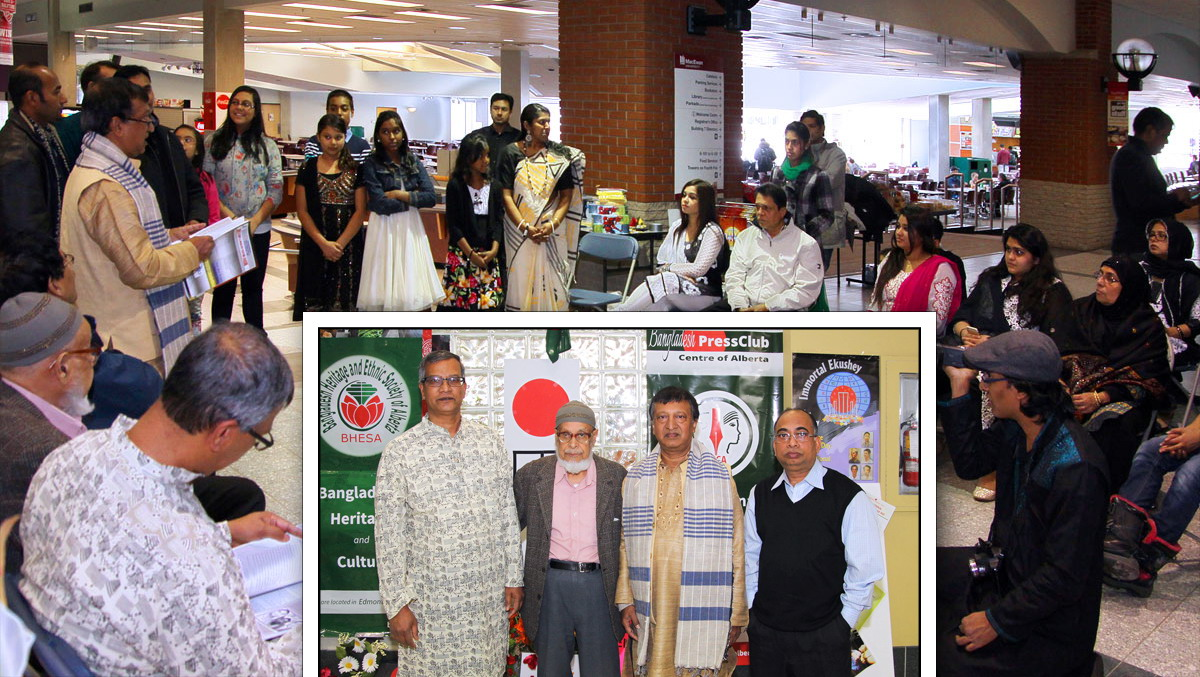
Ekushey Book Fair in Alberta, Canada

== See also ==
- United Nations
- First language
- Linguistic rights
- Universal Declaration of Linguistic Rights
- Official languages of the United Nations
- International Day of the African Child
- European Day of Languages
- International Day of Education
- International Day of the World's Indigenous Peoples
- World Day for Cultural Diversity for Dialogue and Development
