= List of official languages by country and territory =

This is a list of official languages by country and territory. It includes all languages that have official language status either statewide or in a part of the state, or that have status as a national language, regional language, or minority language.

== Definitions ==
Official language
A language designated as having a unique legal status in the state: typically, the language used in a nation's legislative bodies, and often, official government business.
Regional language
A language designated as having official status limited to a specific area, administrative division, or territory of the state. (On this page a regional language has parentheses next to it that contain a region, province, etc. where the language has regional status.)
National language
A language that uniquely represents the national identity of a state, nation, and/or country and is so designated by a country's government; some are technically minority languages. (On this page a national language is followed by parentheses that identify it as a national language status.) Some countries have more than one language with this status.

== List ==
Country/Region	Number of official (including de facto)	Official language(s)	National language(s)	Regional language(s)	Minority language(s)	Widely spoken
Abkhazia (Note: Independence disputed.)	2	Abkhaz; Russian	Abkhaz		Georgian	
Afghanistan	2	Persian (Dari); Pashto	Persian (Dari); Pashto	Uzbek (Note: The third official language – in addition to Pashto and Dari – in areas where the majority speaks them); Turkmen; Pashayi; Nuristani; Balochi; Pamiri		Persian (Dari)
Albania	1	Albanian			Greek; Macedonian; Aromanian	Italian
Algeria	2	Arabic; Berber	Arabic; Berber			French
Andorra	1	Catalan			Spanish; French; Portuguese	
Angola	1	Portuguese	Kimbundu; Umbundu; Kikongo; Chokwe; Kwanyama; Ganguela			Angolan Portuguese
Antigua and Barbuda	2	(English has de facto status); Spanish				Antiguan and Barbudan Creole
Argentina	2	None at federal level (Spanish has de facto status): Argentine Sign Language		Spanish (in Corrientes and Chaco); Guarani (in Corrientes); Kom (in Chaco); Moquoit (in Chaco); Wichi (in Chaco)		Argentine Spanish; English; Italian; German; French; Welsh (in Chubut state)
Armenia	1	Armenian	Armenian (state language)			Russian
Australia	1	None (English has de facto status)		Cocos Malay (on Cocos (Keeling) Islands); English (official status on Norfolk Island); Malay (on Christmas Island); Mandarin Chinese (on Christmas Island); Norfuk (on Norfolk Island)		
Austria	1	German	German (state language)	Burgenland Croatian (parts of Burgenland); Hungarian (parts of Burgenland); Slovene (parts of Carinthia)	Slovene; Czech; Hungarian; Slovak; Romani; Serbian	English
Azerbaijan	1	Azerbaijani	Azerbaijani (state language)			Russian
Bahamas	1	English				
Bahrain	1	Arabic			English	
Bangladesh	1	Bengali	Bengali	Sylheti (parts of Sylhet Division); Chittagonian (parts of Chittagong Division); Rangpuri/Kamtapuri (parts of Rangpur Division)	Chakma; Marma; Rakhine; Hajong; Santali; Tripuri; Manipuri	
Barbados	1	English				
Belarus	2	Belarusian; Russian	Belarusian			Russian
Belgium	3	Dutch; French; German		Dutch (Flanders, Brussels); French (Brussels, Wallonia); German (German-speaking community)		English
Belize	1	English			Garifuna	Kriol (lingua franca); Spanish (border with Mexico and Guatemala)
Benin	1	French				
Bhutan	1	Dzongkha				
Bolivia	37	Castilian (Spanish); Aymara; Araona; Baure; Bésiro (Chiquitano); Canichana; Cavineña; Cayubaba; Chácobo; Chimán; Ese Ejja; Guarani; Guarasu'we; Guarayu; Itonama; Leco; Machajuyai-Kallawaya; Machineri; Maropa; Mojeño-Ignaciano; Mojeño-Trinitario; Moré; Mosetén; Movima; Pacawara; Puquina; Quechua; Sirionó; Tacana; Tapieté; Toromona; Uru-Chipaya; Weenhayek; Yaminawa; Yuki; Yuracaré; Zamuco				
Bosnia and Herzegovina	3	None (Bosnian, Croatian and Serbian all have de facto status)				
Botswana	1	English	Tswana			Other Bantu languages; Several Khoisan languages
Brazil	1	Portuguese	Portuguese	95 municipalities and 3 Brazilian states have co-official languages, with 61 co-officialized languages. The list can be seen at Languages of Brazil.		Spanish; English; French
Brunei	1	Malay				English; Chinese
Bulgaria	1	Bulgarian				
Burkina Faso	4	Mooré; Bissa; Dyula; Fula	Working languages: French; English			
Burundi	3	French; Kirundi; English	Kirundi			Swahili
Cambodia	1	Khmer				French; English; Chinese
Cameroon	2	English; French		Grassfields languages; Beti; Fulfulde; Sawabantu; Hausa; Baka; Bassa; Chadian Arabic; Bafia; Gbaya; Cameroonian Pidgin English; Camfranglais; Mandara		
Canada	2	English (Federal); French (Federal)		Chipewyan (Northwest Territories); Cree (Northwest Territories); Gwich'in (Northwest Territories); Inuinnaqtun (Northwest Territories and Nunavut); Inuktitut (Northwest Territories and Nunavut); Inuvialuktun (Northwest Territories); Mi'kmaq (Nova Scotia); North Slavey (Northwest Territories); South Slavey (Northwest Territories); Tłı̨chǫ (Northwest Territories)	Chipewyan; Cree; Gwich'in; Inuinnaqtun; Inuktitut; Inuvialuktun; Mi'kmaq; North Slavey; South Slavey; Tłı̨chǫ	
Cape Verde	1	Portuguese	Cape Verdean Creole			
Central African Republic	2	French; Sango				
Chad	2	Arabic; French				
Chile	1	Spanish		Languages of ethnic groups are official in their territories		
China	1	Standard Chinese		English (Hong Kong); Portuguese (Macau)	Mongolian; Uyghur; Tibetan; Zhuang; Kazakh; Korean	Other Sinitic languages
Colombia	1	Spanish		Languages of ethnic groups are official in their territories		
Comoros	3	Arabic; Comorian; French				
Democratic Republic of the Congo	1	French	Kituba; Lingala; Swahili; Tshiluba			
Republic of the Congo	1	French			Lingala; Munukutuba	
Cook Islands	2	English; Cook Islands Māori				
Costa Rica	1	Spanish			Indigenous languages; Limonese Creole	
Croatia	1	Croatian	Italian (Istria County); Romani (non-territorial); Slovene (non-territorial)	Serbian; Hungarian; Czech; Slovak; Pannonian Rusyn		English
Cuba	1	Spanish				
Cyprus	2	Greek; Turkish	Armenian; Cypriot Arabic			English
Czech Republic	1	Czech (Note: Slovak language is defined as official language together with Czech language by several laws – e.g. law 500/2004, 337/1992. Source: https://portal.gov.cz. Cited: "Například Správní řád (zákon č. 500/2004 Sb.) stanovuje: "V řízení se jedná a písemnosti se vyhotovují v českém jazyce. Účastníci řízení mohou jednat a písemnosti mohou být předkládány i v jazyce slovenském..." (§16, odstavec 1). Zákon o správě daní a poplatků (337/1992 Sb.) "Úřední jazyk: Před správcem daně se jedná v jazyce českém nebo slovenském. Veškerá písemná podání se předkládají v češtině nebo slovenštině..." (§ 3, odstavec 1). https://portal.gov.cz)	Czech		Belarusian (Note: Citizens belonging to minorities, which traditionally and on long-term basis live within the territory of the Czech Republic, enjoy the right to use their language in communication with authorities and in front of the courts of law (for the list of recognized minorities see National Minorities Policy of the Government of the Czech Republic). The article 25 of the Czech Charter of Fundamental Rights and Basic Freedoms ensures right of the national and ethnic minorities for education and communication with authorities in their own language. Act No. 500/2004 Coll. (The Administrative Rule) in its paragraph 16 (4) (Procedural Language) ensures, that a citizen of the Czech Republic, who belongs to a national or an ethnic minority, which traditionally and on long-term basis lives within the territory of the Czech Republic, have right to address an administrative agency and proceed before it in the language of the minority. In case that the administrative agency doesn't have an employee with knowledge of the language, the agency is bound to obtain a translator at the agency's own expense. According to Act No. 273/2001 (About The Rights of Members of Minorities) paragraph 9 (The right to use language of a national minority in dealing with authorities and in front of the courts of law) the same applies for the members of national minorities also in front of the courts of law.); Bulgarian; Croatian; German; Greek; Hungarian; Polish; Romani; Russian; Rusyn; Serbian; Ukrainian; Vietnamese	
Denmark	1	Danish		Faroese (in the Faroe Islands); Kalaallisut (in Greenland)	German (in Southern Jutland)	English
Djibouti	2	Arabic; French				
Dominica	1	English				
Dominican Republic	1	Spanish				
East Timor	2	Portuguese; Tetum			Indonesian	
Ecuador	1	Spanish		Languages of ethnic groups are official in their territories	Spanish (Note: Official language for intercultural relations); Kichwa; Shuar	
Egypt	1	Arabic	Egyptian Arabic		Coptic	English
El Salvador	1	Spanish				
Equatorial Guinea	3	French; Portuguese; Spanish				
Eritrea	1	Tigrinya				Arabic; Italian
Estonia	1	Estonian				English; Russian
Eswatini	2	English; Swazi				
Ethiopia	5	Afar; Amharic; Oromo; Somali; Tigrinya	Afar; Amharic; Benshangul; Gumuz; Harari; Kunama; Oromo; Sidamo; Somali; Tigrinya			
Fiji	3	English; Fijian; Hindi		Rotuman	Fiji Hindi	
Finland	2	Finnish; Swedish	Finnish; Swedish		Sami (in Enontekiö, Inari, Sodankylä, Utsjoki)	English
France	1	French			Corsican language; Basque language; Breton language	Occitan language
Gabon	1	French				
The Gambia	1	English	Mandinka; Pulaar; Wolof; Serer; Jola; English; Balanta; Arabic; Mandjak; Mankanya; Noon; Dyula; Soninke; Fula; Karon; Kassonke; Cangin; Gambian Sign Language			Wolof; Mandinka; Pulaar; Soninke; Jola-Fonyi; Serer; Mandjak; Bainuk; Kiriol
Georgia	1	Georgian				Russian
Germany	1	German		Danish (in Schleswig-Holstein); Lower Sorbian (in Brandenburg); North Frisian (in Schleswig-Holstein); Saterland Frisian (in Lower Saxony); Upper Sorbian (in Saxony); German Sign Language; Low German	Danish; Lower Sorbian; North Frisian; Romani; Upper Sorbian	English
Ghana	1	English		Fante; Asante Twi; Akuapem Twi; Adangme (in Greater Accra); Dagaare (in the Upper West Region); Dagbani (in the Northern Region); Ewe (in the Volta Region); Ga (in Greater Accra); Gonja (in the Northern Region); Kasem (in the Upper East Region); Nzema (in the Western Region)	Working languages: English; French; Hindi (except Urdu); Arabic; Ghanaian English; Ghanaian Pidgin English	
Greece	1	Greek				
Grenada	1	English				
Guatemala	1	Spanish	Garifuna; Maya; Xinca			
Guinea	1	French				Fula; Maninka; Susu
Guinea-Bissau	1	Portuguese				
Guyana	1	English		Akawaio; Carib; Lokono; Macushi; Mawayana; Patamona; Pemon (Arekuna); Waiwai; Wapishana; Warao	Dutch; Guyanese Hindustani; Chinese; Portuguese; Spanish	Guyanese Creole
Haiti	2	French; Haitian Creole				
Honduras	1	Spanish				
Hong Kong	2	Cantonese; English				
Hungary	1	Hungarian			Croatian; German; Romanian; Serbian; Slovak; Slovene	
Iceland	2	Icelandic; Icelandic Sign Language				
India	2	Hindi; English	Scheduled languages: Assamese; Bengali; Bodo; Dogri; Gujarati; Hindi; Kannada; Kashmiri; Konkani; Maithili; Malayalam; Meitei (Manipuri); Marathi; Nepali; Odia (Oriya); Punjabi; Sanskrit; Santali; Sindhi; Tamil; Telugu; Urdu	Assamese; Bengali; Boro; Chhattisgarhi; Dogri; Garo; Gujarati; Hindi; Ho; Kannada; Kashmiri; Khasi; Konkani; Maithili; Meitei; Marathi; Mizo; Nepali; Odia; Punjabi; Santali; Sindhi; Tamil; Telugu; Urdu		
Indonesia	1	Indonesian	Indonesian	Javanese (in Yogyakarta)		Indonesian; Malay; Javanese; Sundanese; Batak; Minangkabau; 700 more languages in Indonesia
Iran	1	Persian	Persian		Azerbaijani; Kurdish; Luri; Gilaki; Mazanderani; Balochi; Arabic; Qashqai; Tati; Turkmeni	
Iraq	2	Arabic; Kurdish		Armenian recognized; Assyrian Neo-Aramaic (in Assyrian areas); Iraqi Turkmen (in Turkmen areas)		
Ireland	2	Irish; English	Irish			
Israel	1	Hebrew		Arabic	English	Russian; English
Italy	1	Italian		French (in Aosta Valley); Franco-Provençal (in Aosta Valley); German (in South Tyrol); Ladin (in South Tyrol); Friulian (in Friuli-Venezia Giulia); Sardinian (in Sardinia); Corsican (in northern Sardinia)	Catalan (in Sardinia); Slovene (in Friuli-Venezia Giulia); Occitan (in Piedmont's Occitan valleys); Albanian (in Sicily and Calabria); Greek (in Calabria and Puglia)	Other Italo-Dalmatian languages
Ivory Coast	1	French				
Jamaica	1	English	Jamaican Patois	Jamaican Patois		Jamaican Patois
Japan	1	None (Japanese has de facto status)	Japanese			
Jordan	1	Arabic			Circassian; Chechen; Armenian	
Kazakhstan	2	Kazakh; Russian	Kazakh			
Kenya	2	English; Swahili	Swahili			
Kiribati	2	English; Gilbertese				
North Korea	1	Korean				
South Korea	2	Korean; Korean Sign Language				
Kosovo	2	Albanian; Serbian	Albanian (nationwide); Serbian (Northern Kosovo)	Turkish		
Kuwait	1	Arabic	Kuwaiti Sign Language; Kuwaiti Arabic; Kuwaiti Persian			
Kyrgyzstan	2	Kyrgyz; Russian	Kyrgyz			
Laos	1	Lao				French
Latvia	1	Latvian				Russian
Lebanon	1	Arabic	Arabic; English; French	Arabic	Armenian	Arabic; English; French
Lesotho	2	Sesotho; English	Sotho			
Liberia	1	English				
Libya	1	Arabic				
Liechtenstein	1	German				
Lithuania	1	Lithuanian				Polish; Russian
Luxembourg	3	French; German; Luxembourgish	Luxembourgish			English; Portuguese
Macau	2	Cantonese; Portuguese				
Madagascar	2	French; Malagasy	Malagasy			
Malawi	1	English	Chichewa			
Malaysia	1	Malay (Note: Article 152 of the Constitution of Malaysia designated Malay as the national language. Section 2 of that article allowed English to be used officially until otherwise provided by Parliament. In 1967, the Parliament of Malaysia passed the National Language Act, making Malay the official language of Malaysia. The act does, however, allow the use of English for some official purposes. On 11 July 1990, following the amendment of the National Language Act 1963/67 (Act 32) (Revised in 1971), Malay replaced English as the official language of the courts in West Malaysia. The amending Act provided English to be used in the Courts in West Malaysia where it deems necessary in the interest of Justice. East Malaysia continued using English as the official language in their courts. Since 2007, the official policy is to refer to the national language as the Malaysian language (Bahasa Malaysia), although legislation still refers to the Malay language (Bahasa Melayu).)	Malay	Regional/State dialects		Malay; Mandarin Chinese; Cantonese; Tamil; English
Maldives	1	Dhivehi	Dhivehi			English
Mali	13	Bambara; Bobo; Bozo; Dogon; Fula; Hassaniya; Kassonke; Maninke; Minyanka; Senufo; Songhay; Soninke; Tamasheq			French	
Malta	2	Maltese; English	Maltese			
Sovereign Military Order of Malta	1	Italian				
Marshall Islands	2	English; Marshallese				
Mauritania	1	Arabic	Arabic; Fula; Soninke; Wolof			French
Mauritius	2	None (English and French have de facto status)			Mauritian Bhojpuri	Mauritian Creole
Mexico	1	None (Spanish has de facto status)	68 National languages			
Federated States of Micronesia	1	English		Chuukese (in Chuuk State); Kosraean (in Kosrae State); Pohnpeian (in Pohnpei State); Yapese (in Yap State)		
Moldova	1	Romanian		Gagauz; Russian; Ukrainian		
Monaco	1	French				Monégasque
Mongolia	1	Mongolian				
Montenegro	1	Montenegrin				
Morocco	2	Arabic; Berber	Arabic; Berber			French
Mozambique	1	Portuguese				
Myanmar (Burma)	1	Burmese		Chin; Kachin; Karen; Karenni; Mon; Rakhine; Shan		English
Namibia	1	English	Afrikaans	German; Oshiwambo		
Nauru	2	English; Nauruan				
Nepal	1	Nepali	All languages spoken as the mother tongue in Nepal			
Netherlands	1	Dutch		Frisian (in the province of Friesland); English (in Sint Maarten, Sint Eustatius, Saba); Papiamento (in Aruba, Curaçao, Bonaire)	Dutch Low Saxon; Dutch Sign Language; Limburgish; Sinte Romani; Yiddish	English
New Zealand	3	Māori language; New Zealand Sign Language; (English has de facto status)		Tokelauan language (in Tokelau)		
Nicaragua	1	Spanish		In Autonomous Regions: Creole; Garifuna; Mayangna; Miskito; Rama; Sumo		
Niger	1	Hausa	Arabic; French; Fulfulde; Gulmancema; Kanuri; Zarma; Tamazight			
Nigeria	1	English	Hausa; Yoruba; Igbo			English; Hausa
Niue	2	English; Niuean				
North Macedonia	2	Macedonian; Albanian				
Northern Cyprus	1	Turkish				
Norway	2	Norwegian; Sami	Bokmål (written); Nynorsk (written)	Northern Sami; Lule Sami; Southern Sámi; Kven	Kven; Scandoromani	English
Oman	1	Arabic			Shehri	
Pakistan	2	Urdu; English	Urdu	Punjabi; Sindhi; Pashto; Balochi; Saraiki; Hindko; Brahui; Kashmiri; Balti; Shina	Burushaski; Khowar; Wakhi; Gujari; Torwali; Gawri/Kalāmi; Dhatki; Marwari; Gujarati; Memoni; Hazargi; Persian/Dari	Punjabi; Balochi; Sindhi; Pashto; Saraiki
Palau	2	English; Palauan		Sonsorolese (in Sonsorol); Tobian (in Hatohobei); Japanese (in Angaur)		
Palestine	1	Arabic				English; Hebrew
Panama	1	Spanish				
Papua New Guinea	4	English; Hiri Motu; PNG Sign Language; Tok Pisin				
Paraguay	2	Spanish; Guarani				
Peru	1	Spanish		Quechua, Aymara and other native languages are official wherever they predominate.		
Philippines	2	Filipino; English	Filipino; Filipino Sign Language (national sign language)	Aklanon (in the Visayas); Bikol (in Luzon); Cebuano (in the Visayas and Mindanao); Chavacano (in Mindanao); Hiligaynon (in the Visayas); Ibanag (in Luzon); Ilocano (in Luzon, official in La Union); Ivatan (in Luzon); Kapampangan (in Luzon); Kinaray-a (in the Visayas); Maguindanao (in Mindanao); Maranao (in Mindanao); Pangasinan (in Luzon); Sambal (in Luzon); Tagalog (in Luzon); Tausug (in Mindanao); Waray (in the Visayas); Yakan (in Mindanao)	Arabic (Note: As per the 1987 Constitution which states "Spanish and Arabic shall be promoted on a voluntary and optional basis".) (optional language); Spanish (optional language); Over 100 more minority languages	
Poland	1	Polish		Kashubian (Pomeranian Voivodeship); German (Opole Voivodeship); Lithuanian (Puńsk commune); Belarusian (Podlaskie Voivodseship)	Lemko; Karaim; Tatar; Ukrainian	English
Portugal	1	Portuguese		Mirandese (Terra de Miranda)		English
Qatar	1	Arabic				
Romania	1	Romanian			Armenian; German; Hungarian; Romani; Russian; Serbian; Slovak; Tatar; Turkish; Ukrainian	
Russia	1	Russian		Ossetic; Ukrainian; Belarusian; Buryat; Kalmyk; Chechen; Ingush; Abaza; Adyghe; Tsakhur; Lezgian; Cherkess; Kabardian; Altai; Bashkir; Chuvash; Crimean Tatar; Karachay-Balkar; Khakas; Nogai; Tatar; Tuvan; Yakut; Erzya; Komi; Hill Mari; Meadow Mari; Karelian; Moksha; Veps; Ingrian; Ludian; Udmurt		
Rwanda	4	English; French; Kinyarwanda; Swahili	Kinyarwanda			
Sahrawi Arab Democratic Republic	2	Arabic; Spanish	Arabic			
Saint Kitts and Nevis	1	English				
Saint Lucia	1	English				
Saint Vincent and the Grenadines	1	English				
Samoa	2	English; Samoan				
San Marino	1	Italian				
São Tomé and Príncipe	1	Portuguese				
Saudi Arabia	1	Arabic			Faifi; Razihi; Mehri	Indian Languages; Filipino; Bengali
Senegal	1	French	Jola-Fogny; Mandinka; Pulaar; Serer; Soninke; Wolof			
Serbia	1	Serbian			(15 languages)	
Seychelles	3	English; French; Seychellois Creole				
Sierra Leone	1	English	Krio			
Singapore	4	English; Malay; Mandarin Chinese; Tamil	Malay			
Slovakia	1	Slovak			Bulgarian; Czech; German; Hungarian; Polish; Romani; Rusyn; Serbian; Ukrainian	
Slovenia	1	Slovene			Hungarian (Dobrovnik, Hodoš, Lendava); Italian (Izola, Koper, Piran); Croatian (Metlika, Brežice)	
Solomon Islands	1	English				
Somalia	2	Somali; Arabic				
Somaliland	3	Arabic; English; Somali				
South Africa	12	Afrikaans; English; Southern Ndebele; Sotho; Northern Sotho; Swazi; Tsonga; Tswana; Venda; Xhosa; Zulu; SA Sign Language			Languages with constitutional special status: Khoe languages; Nama; Khoisan languages; German; Greek; Gujarati; Hindi; Portuguese; Telugu; Tamil; Urdu; Arabic; Hebrew; Sanskrit	
South Ossetia	2	Ossetian; Russian		Georgian	Georgian	
South Sudan	1	English	Bari; Dinka; Luo; Murle; Nuer; Zande; (60 other languages)			
Spain	1	Spanish		Catalan (Balearic Islands, Catalonia, Valencian Community); Galician (Galicia); Occitan (Catalonia); Basque (Basque Country, Navarra)	Astur-Leonese (Asturias, León, Zamora, Salamanca, Cáceres); Aragonese (Aragon); Fala (Province of Cáceres); Portuguese; Galician (Asturias, León, Zamora); Catalan (Aragon, Carche)	
Sri Lanka	2	Sinhala; Tamil				English
Sudan	2	Arabic; English				
Suriname	1	Dutch		Akurio; Lokono; Carib-Kari'nja; Sikiana-Kashuyana; Tiro-Tiriyó; Waiwai; Warao; Wayana	Sranan Tongo; Sarnami Hindustani; Surinamese Javanese; Ndyuka; Saramaccan; Matawai; Aluku; Paramaccan; Kwinti; Hakka; Mandarin; Levantine Arabic; English; Portuguese; Spanish; French	
Sweden	1	Swedish			Finnish (Gällivare, Haparanda, Kiruna, Pajala, Övertorneå); Meänkieli (Gällivare, Haparanda, Kiruna, Pajala, Övertorneå); Sami (Arjeplog, Gällivare, Jokkmokk, Kiruna); Yiddish; Romani	English
Switzerland	4	French (Bern, Fribourg, Geneva, Jura, Neuchâtel, Valais, Vaud); German (Aargau, Appenzell Ausserrhoden, Appenzell Innerrhoden, Basel-Landschaft, Basel-Stadt, Bern, Fribourg, Glarus, Graubünden, Lucerne, Nidwalden, Obwalden, Saint Gallen, Schaffhausen, Schwyz, Solothurn, Thurgau, Uri, Valais, Zug, Zürich); Italian (Ticino, Graubünden); Romansh (Graubünden)				
Syria	1	Arabic		Kurdish	Assyrian; Western Neo-Aramaic; Armenian	
Taiwan	1	None (Mandarin Chinese has de facto status)	Taiwanese Mandarin (Note: Not designated but meets legal definition); Taiwanese Hokkien; Taiwanese Hakka; Formosan languages; Taiwan Sign Language; Matsu dialect; Wuqiu dialect			
Tajikistan	1	Tajik	Tajik			Russian
Tanzania	2	Swahili; English	Swahili			
Thailand	1	Thai		Central Thai; Isan; Northern Thai; Southern Thai	Sixty-two 'domestic' languages are officially recognized	Burmese
Togo	1	French				
Tonga	2	English; Tongan				
Transnistria	3	Moldovan; Russian; Ukrainian				
Trinidad and Tobago	1	English			Spanish; Trinidadian Hindustani; Trinidadian French-Creole (Patois); Chinese; Yoruba; Arabic; Portuguese	Trinidadian Creole; Tobagonian Creole
Tunisia	1	Arabic	Arabic			
Turkey	1	Turkish	Turkish		Kurdish	
Turkmenistan	1	Turkmen	Turkmen			Russian
Tuvalu	2	Tuvaluan; English	Tuvaluan; English			
Uganda	2	English; Swahili				
Ukraine	1	Ukrainian		Russian (Autonomous Republic of Crimea); Crimean Tatar (Autonomous Republic of Crimea)		
United Arab Emirates	1	Arabic				English
United Kingdom and Crown dependencies etc.	1	None (English has de facto status)		Irish and Ulster-Scots (in Northern Ireland); Scots and Scottish Gaelic (in Scotland); Welsh (in Wales); Pitcairnese (in Pitcairn Islands); Guernésiais and French (in Guernsey); Jèrriais and French (in Jersey); Manx (in Isle of Man)		
United States	1	None (English has de facto status) (Note: In the United States of America, English is the language of the Declaration of Independence and the Constitution of the United States and is the working language of the federal government. It was first declared the official language by Executive Order 14224 in 2025. Some states - such as Arizona, California, Florida, New Mexico, and Texas - provide official documents in both Spanish and English. Attempts to designate English as the official language of the federal government of the United States by act of Congress have not succeeded. See also Languages of the United States.)	English	(28 languages)	indigenous languages of recognized federal tribes	
Uruguay	2	(Spanish has de facto status); Uruguayan Sign Language				
Uzbekistan	1	Uzbek			Uzbek; Karakalpak and Uzbek in Karakalpakstan	Russian
Vanuatu	3	English; French; Bislama				
Vatican City	2	Italian; Latin				Swiss German
Venezuela	1	Spanish			Native languages are official for indigenous peoples	
Vietnam	1	Vietnamese	Vietnamese		Cantonese; Cham; Hmong; Khmer; Lao; Muong; Rade; Tay; Thai; Vietnamese sign languages	
Yemen	1	Arabic			Mehri; Soqotri	
Zambia	1	English				
Zimbabwe	16	Chewa; Chibarwe; English; Kalanga; Khoisan (Note: Refers to the Tjwao dialect); Nambya; Ndau; Ndebele; Shangani; Shona; Sign language (Note: See Zimbabwean sign languages); Sotho; Tonga; Tswana; Venda; Xhosa				

== List of languages by number of countries in which they are the official language ==
This is a ranking of languages by number of sovereign countries in which they are de jure or de facto official, although there are no precise inclusion criteria or definition of a language. An '*' (asterisk) indicates a country whose independence is disputed.

Partially recognized or de facto independent countries are denoted by an asterisk (*)

Language	World	Africa	Americas	Asia	Europe	Oceania	Countries
English	57	22	14	4	3	14	United States, (Note: In the United States of America, English is the language of the Declaration of Independence and the Constitution of the United States and is the working language of the federal government. It was first declared the official language by Executive Order 14224 in 2025. Some states - such as Arizona, California, Florida, New Mexico, and Texas - provide official documents in both Spanish and English. Attempts to designate English as the official language of the federal government of the United States by act of Congress have not succeeded. See also Languages of the United States.) United Kingdom, Canada, Australia, New Zealand, Ireland, South Africa, India, Nigeria (See the full list)
French	26	18	2	–	5	1	France, Canada, Belgium, Switzerland, Madagascar, Monaco, Haiti, Vanuatu (See the full list)
Arabic	24–26*	12–14*	–	12	–	–	Egypt, Sudan, Algeria, Iraq, Morocco, Saudi Arabia, United Arab Emirates, Palestine (See the full list)
Spanish	21–22*	1–2*	19	–	1		Spain, Colombia, Argentina, Chile, Mexico, Honduras, Equatorial Guinea, Peru, Antigua and Barbuda, Costa Rica, Panama (See the full list)
Portuguese	9	6	1	1	1	–	Portugal, Brazil, Mozambique, Angola, East Timor, Cabo Verde, São Tomé and Príncipe, Guinea-Bissau, Equatorial Guinea, Macau (See the full list)
German	6	–	–	–	6	–	Germany, Austria, Switzerland, Belgium, Luxembourg, Liechtenstein (See the full list)
Russian	4–7*	–	–	2	2–5*	–	Russia, Kazakhstan, Belarus, Kyrgyzstan, Abkhazia,* South Ossetia,* Transnistria* (See the full list)
Serbo-Croatian	4–5*	–	–	–	4–5*	–	Serbia (known as Serbian), Croatia (known as Croatian), Montenegro (known as Montenegrin), Bosnia and Herzegovina (known as Bosnian, Croatian and Serbian), Kosovo* (known as Serbian)
Italian	4	–	–	–	4	–	Italy, Switzerland, San Marino, Vatican City
Malay	4	–	–	4	–	–	Malaysia, Indonesia (known as Indonesian), Singapore, Brunei
Swahili	4	4	–	–	–	–	Kenya, Rwanda, Tanzania, Uganda
Berber	3	3	–	–	–	–	Algeria, Morocco, Mali
Dutch	3	–	1	–	2	–	Netherlands, Belgium, Suriname
Persian	3	–	–	3	–	–	Iran, Afghanistan (known as Dari), Tajikistan (known as Tajik)
Sotho	3	3	–	–	–	–	South Africa, Lesotho, Zimbabwe
Tswana	3	3	–	–	–	–	Botswana, South Africa, Zimbabwe
Albanian	2–3*	–	–	–	2–3*	–	Albania, Kosovo,* North Macedonia
Standard Chinese	2–3*	–	–	2–3*	–	–	China, Singapore, Taiwan*
Romanian	2–3*	–	–	–	2-3*	–	Romania, Moldova, Transnistria*
Somali	2–3*	2–3*	–	–	–	–	Somalia, Ethiopia, Somaliland*
Turkish	2–3*	–	–	–	2–3*	–	Turkey, Northern Cyprus,* Cyprus
Aymara	2	–	2	–	–	–	Bolivia and Peru
Bengali	2	–	–	2	–	–	Bangladesh and India
Chichewa	2	2	–	–	–	–	Malawi and Zimbabwe
Fula	2	2	–	–	–	–	Mali and Burkina Faso
Greek	2	–	–	–	2	–	Greece and Cyprus
Guarani	2	–	2	–	–	–	Paraguay and Bolivia
Hindi	2	–	–	2	–	–	India and Fiji
Korean	2	–	–	2	–	–	North Korea and South Korea
Quechua	2	–	2	–	–	–	Bolivia and Peru
Rwanda-Rundi	2	2	–	–	–	–	Burundi (known as Kirundi) and Rwanda (known as Kinyarwanda)
Swati	2	2	–	–	–	–	Eswatini and South Africa
Swedish	2	–	–	–	2	–	Sweden and Finland
Tamil	2	–	–	2	–	–	Sri Lanka and Singapore
Tigrinya	2	2	–	–	–	–	Eritrea and Ethiopia
Venda	2	2	–	–	–	–	South Africa and Zimbabwe

== See also ==
- List of official languages
- Linguistic demography
- Lists of countries and territories by official language
- Lists of endangered languages
- Lists of languages
- List of languages by number of native speakers
- List of languages by total number of speakers
- World language
- Languages used on the Internet

By ISO 639-3 code
Enter an ISO code to find the corresponding language article.
