= Languages of Lesotho =

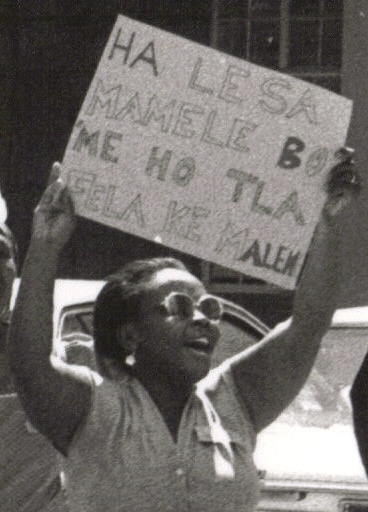
- Woman with a protest sign in Sesotho, Maseru
- Official: Sesotho, IsiXhosa, SiPhuthi and English
- Minority: IsiXhosa, SiPhuthi, IsiZulu
- Immigrant: Afrikaans
- Signed: Lesotho Sign Language
- Keyboard layout: QWERTY
- Source: Ethnologue

Lesotho, a country in Southern Africa, is home to several languages, including SiPhuthi, Sesotho, IsiXhosa, IsiZulu and English, — all, except for English, belong to the Niger–Congo language family.

== National and official languages ==
The official languages of the Kingdom of Lesotho are Sesotho, English, isiXhosa, and SiPhuthi. (Note: The people of Lesotho are called Basotho (sing. Mosotho), where "ba-" indicates plural; see Rosenberg, Weisfelder & Frisbie-Fulton 2005, p. 12 and Van Wyk 1998, p. 54.) Sesotho was recognized as the national language by the National and Official Languages Bill, ratified by the National Assembly of Lesotho on 12 September 1966, which also established Sesotho and English as the country's then two official languages, amended on 12 August 2022 to add the further two official languages, IsiXhosa and SiPhuthi. The country's language policy before the amendment promoted bilingualism.

Sesotho is the first language of more than 90 percent of the population and is "used widely as a medium of communication" in day-to-day speech. English is reserved for official interactions, such as "government and administration".

Before the official language amendment, primary education of children would take place in Sesotho for the first three years, with English becoming the medium of instruction in the fourth year of primary school. Competence in English is "particularly important ... for educational, political, social and economic transactions in the subcontinent" and facilitates obtaining employment within Lesotho and abroad.

== Minority and immigrant languages ==
A minority of Basotho, estimated to number 248,000 as of 1993, speak IsiZulu, one of the eleven official languages of South Africa. SiPhuthi, a Tekela language closer in phonology to SiSwati, an official language of South Africa and Eswatini, is spoken by 43,000 Basotho (as of 2002). IsiXhosa, a Zunda Nguni language and official language of South Africa, is spoken by 18,000 people in Lesotho. Speakers of these minority languages typically also speak Sesotho.

Afrikaans, spoken mainly in South Africa and Namibia, is an immigrant language.

== See also ==
- Languages of South Africa
- Languages of Eswatini

== Notes ==
Footnotes

Citations
