= Liberal neutrality =

Liberal neutrality is the view that a liberal state should be neutral in debates over moral positions.

== Overview ==
Canadian philosopher Will Kymlicka has defined liberal neutrality as "the view that the state should not reward or penalize particular conceptions of the good life but, rather, should provide a neutral framework within which different and potentially conflicting conceptions of the good can be pursued." Alan Patten has defined it as the view "that the liberal state has a responsibility to be neutral toward the various conceptions of the good that are affirmed by its citizens."

British political commentator Toby Buckle has written that "In recent American history, the most powerful liberals, when asked to justify neutrality—to explain how and why they use it—will often say they are applying “the rules” fairly and impartially. And this, to them, is what liberalism is for. Its role is as the referee of the great ideological game, not a player in it."

Kevin Vallier of Bowling Green State University has defined liberal neutrality as arising out of 17th century liberal arguments for religious tolerance in Europe, defining a liberal neutral state as one that "preserves functioning relationships between citizens and between the public and the state and prevents conflicts from erupting into violence. To do so, political officials do not take sides between our competing moral visions."

The most influential philosopher in advancing ideas of liberal neutrality has been John Rawls.

== Debates ==
=== Support ===
Kevin Vallier of Bowling Green State University has argued that liberal neutrality is necessary as "a non-neutral state degrades relationships within the polity. The neutral state fosters solidarity between people with diverse views."

In 2004, political scientist Andrew Koppelman wrote that "much of its appeal for liberals probably had to do with its usefulness in addressing the so-called 'culture wars.' Neutrality theory emerged in the with controversies over abortion, gay rights, funding care policy, the roles of the sexes, and the place of traditional values in education and especially in sex education."

=== Criticism ===
According to political scientist Andrew Koppelman, one of the main objections to liberal neutrality is the argument that it is incoherent, "because any determinate politics must necessarily rely upon and promote some contestable scheme of values." British political commentator Toby Buckle has argued that neutrality is "a considerable deviation from liberalism’s self-understanding and self-justification," saying that previous liberal movements and thinkers, including John Locke, the New Deal, and the civil rights movement, were "a creed with a strong sense of its own values. Far from being content to “neutrally” enforce existing rights, it sought to expand them and create new ones."

Philosopher Joseph Shaw has argued that neutrality leads to a situation where "liberalism, in short, will not allow itself to be challenged."

Philosopher Kwame Anthony Appiah wrote in 2023 that "perhaps the most vigorous opponent of liberal neutrality in the past century was the German jurist and political theorist Carl Schmitt." According to Appiah, Schmitt's view was that "politics could never really be supplanted with liberal proceduralism... real politics was, at bottom, about crushing your enemies," saying that "Schmitt was prescient in attacking neutrality before most liberal theorists even recognized the importance of the concept."

== See also ==
- Postliberalism
