= Amie Fabureh =

Gambian politician

Amie Fabureh is a Gambian politician who is serving as the Minister of Agriculture. She was appointed on 27 March 2019, by President Adama Barrow after working in the ministry for 30 years in different positions including as Training Officer in the Department of Agricultural Development Agency from 2007 to 2009, and Deputy Manager until 2017 when she became Horticulture Technical Services Manager. She was the chairwoman of the National Women's Council (NWC) in 2018.

Fabureh holds a master's degree in horticulture from the University of Reading in the United Kingdom and a Post Graduate Diploma in Gender and Development from the Management Development Institute, Gambia.
