= Languages of the Gambia =

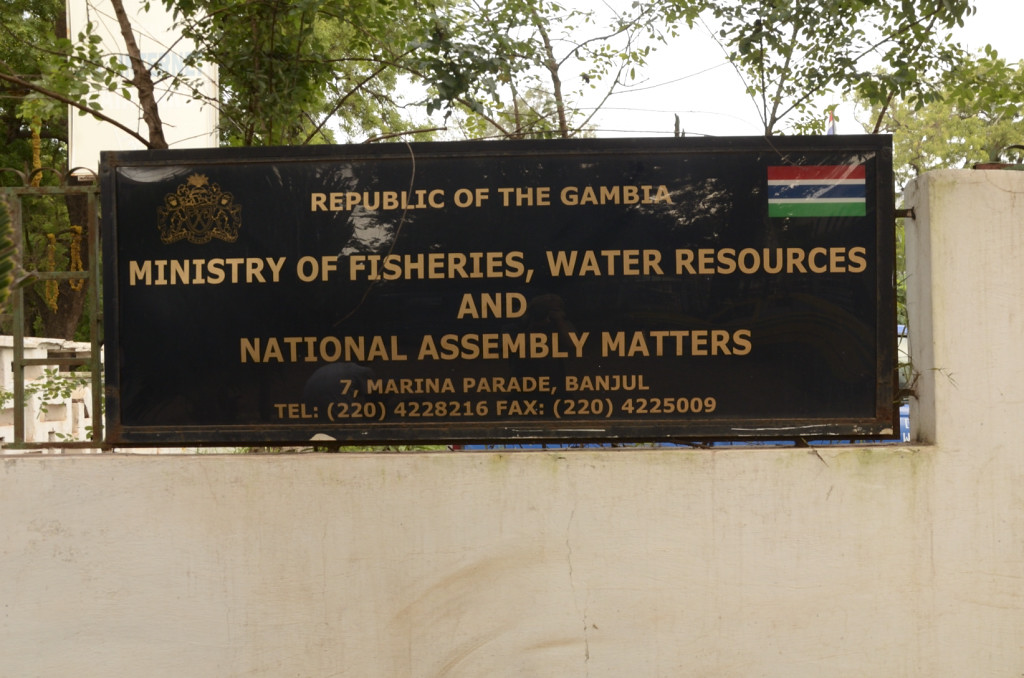
- Sign in English at a Gambian ministry
- Official: English
- National: Mandinka, Pulaar, Wolof, Serer, Jola, English, Balanta, Arabic, Jola-Fonyi, Manjak, Mankanya, Noon, Dyula, Soninke, Fula, Karon, Kassonke, Cangin, Bainouk, Portuguese Creole
- Vernacular: Gambian English
- Foreign: French
- Signed: Gambian Sign Language
- Keyboard layout: QWERTY

Distribution of first languages of The Gambia
Mandinka	38%
Pulaar	21%
Wolof	18%
Soninke	9%
Jola-Fonyi	4.5%
Serer	2.4%
Manjak	1.6%
Bainouk	1.6%
Kiriol	1%
English	0.5%
Other	2.4%

In The Gambia, Mandinka is spoken as a first language by 38% of the population, Pulaar by 21%, Wolof by 18%, Soninke by 9 percent, Jola by 4.5 percent, Serer by 2.4 percent, Manjak and Bainouk by 1.6 percent each, Portuguese Creole by 1 percent, and English by 0.5 percent. Smaller numbers speak several other languages. Gambian Sign Language is used by the deaf. English is the main language for official purposes and education.

== See also ==
- Demographics of the Gambia
