= Kunda Kamara =

Gambian politician

Kunda Kamara (1947–2001) was a Gambian politician.

Kamara was a member of the National Assembly of the Gambia.

Earlier, Kamara was a member of the Banjul City Council.

Kamara died in a car accident along with the politician Abou Karamba Kassamba, the politician Buba Samura, and two other people.

She died in a car accident on January 6, 2001, on her way home to Kanifing. The accident occurred on South Bank Road between Fula Bantang and Yero Beri Kunda. The accident also killed United Democratic Party (UDP) members of parliament Abou Karamba Kassamba and Buba Samura, and two others.
