= Languages of Iceland =

- Official: Icelandic 93.2% Icelandic Sign Language
- Immigrant: Polish 2.74% Lithuanian 0.43% English 0.32% German 0.31% Danish 0.31% Portuguese 0.28% Filipino 0.24% Thai 0.17% Latvian 0.14% Other 1.89%
- Foreign: English (98%); Danish / Norwegian / Swedish; French / German / Spanish
- Signed: Icelandic Sign Language
- Keyboard layout: QWERTY; Icelandic
- Source: Statistics Iceland (2008)

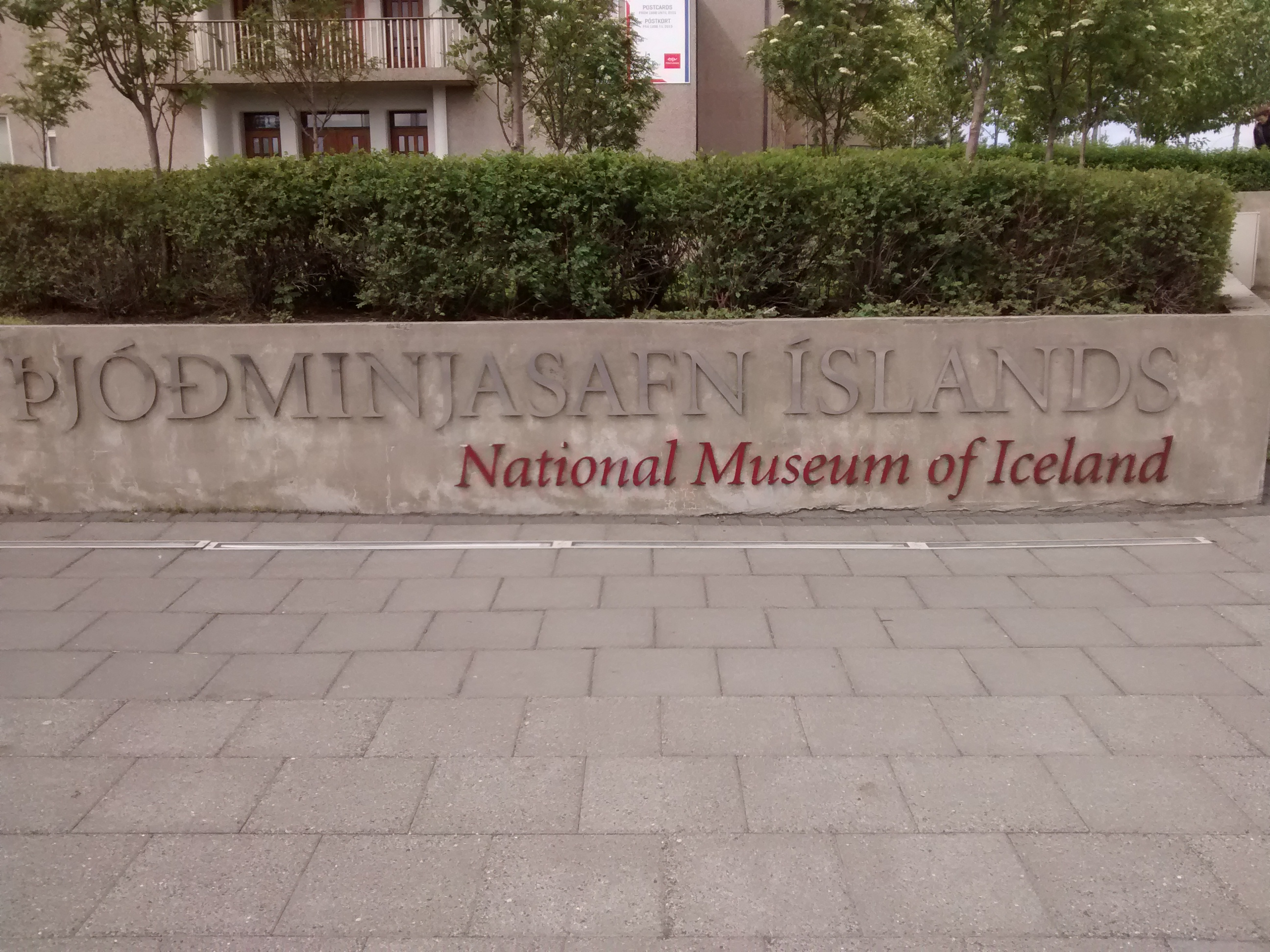
The sign in front of the National Museum of Iceland, bilingual in Icelandic and English

Iceland has been a very isolated and linguistically homogeneous island historically, but has nevertheless been home to several languages. Although the Icelandic or Norse language prevails, northern trade routes brought German, English, Dutch, French and Basque to Iceland. Some merchants and clergymen settled in Iceland throughout the centuries, leaving their mark on culture, but linguistically mainly trade, nautical, and religious terms. Excluding these and Latin words, Icelandic has been altered remarkably little since settlement.

Icelandic is not only the national language, but is now “the official language in Iceland” by virtue of Act No 61/2011, adopted by parliament in 2011. Icelandic Sign Language was also officially recognised by law in 2011 as a minority language with constitutional rights and the first language of the Icelandic deaf community. During the time of Danish rule, Danish was a minority language in Iceland. Iceland was a territory ruled by Denmark–Norway, making Danish one of its former official languages; its official status was terminated in 1944.

Studying English and Danish (or another Scandinavian language) is mandatory for students in compulsory schools and also part of many secondary-level study programmes, so knowledge of the two languages is widespread. Other foreign languages frequently studied include German, Spanish and French. A telephone poll in 2011 indicates that 88% of Icelandic people hear English every day, and 65% hear English more than one hour a day.

Temporary visitors and residents often make up a large portion of the population, especially in the capital Reykjavík.

== See also ==
- Icelandic
- Linguistic purism in Icelandic
