= Languages of San Marino =

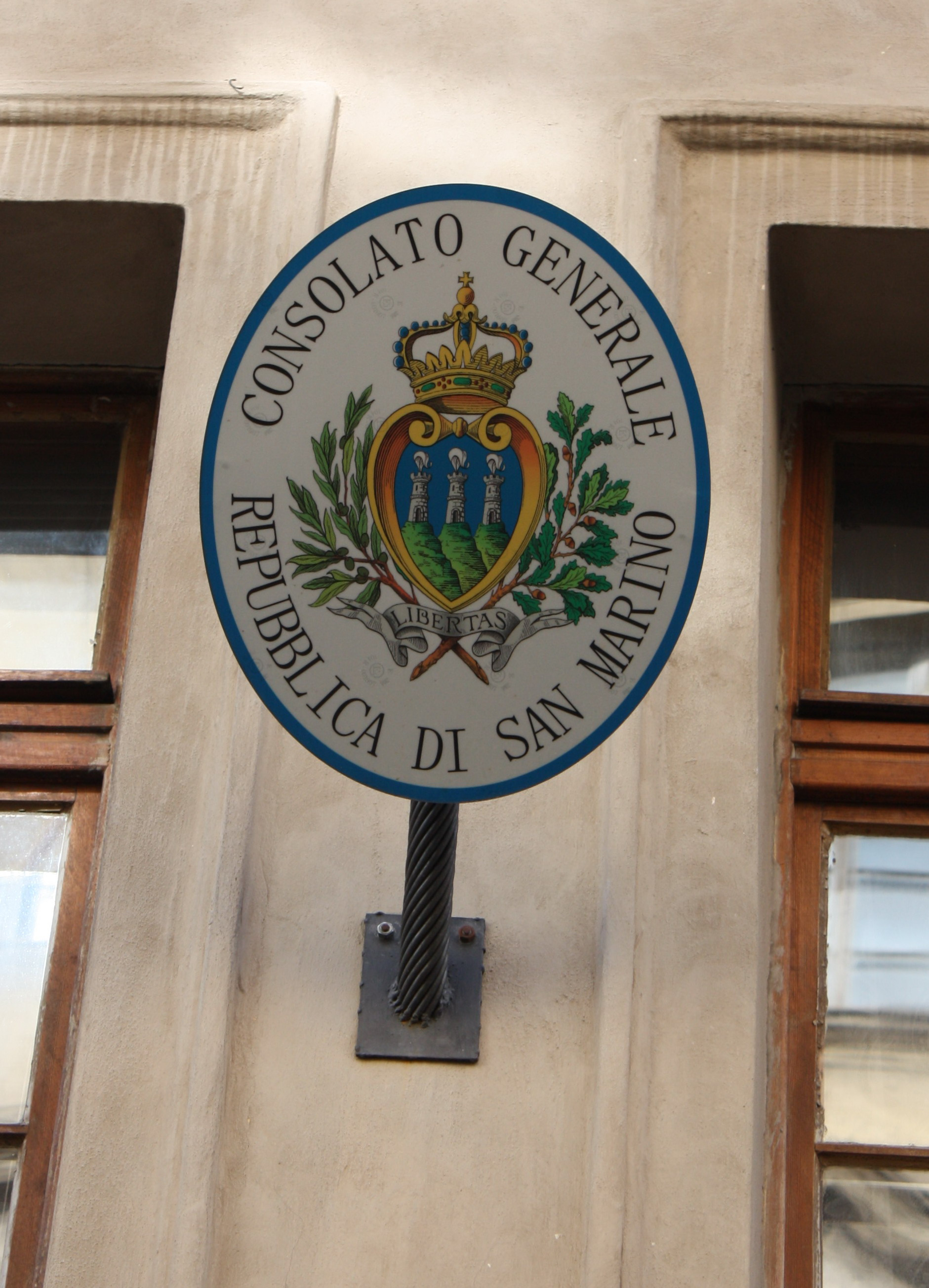
- Sign in Italian at the Sammarinese consulate in Prague
- Official: Italian
- National: Sammarinese dialect of Romagnol
- Foreign: English
- Signed: Italian Sign Language
- Keyboard layout: Italian QWERTY

Italian is the only official language of San Marino.

Use of the Sammarinese variety of Romagnol is more common among elderly individuals. Conservation is critical, to the point it is estimated to go extinct after 2040.

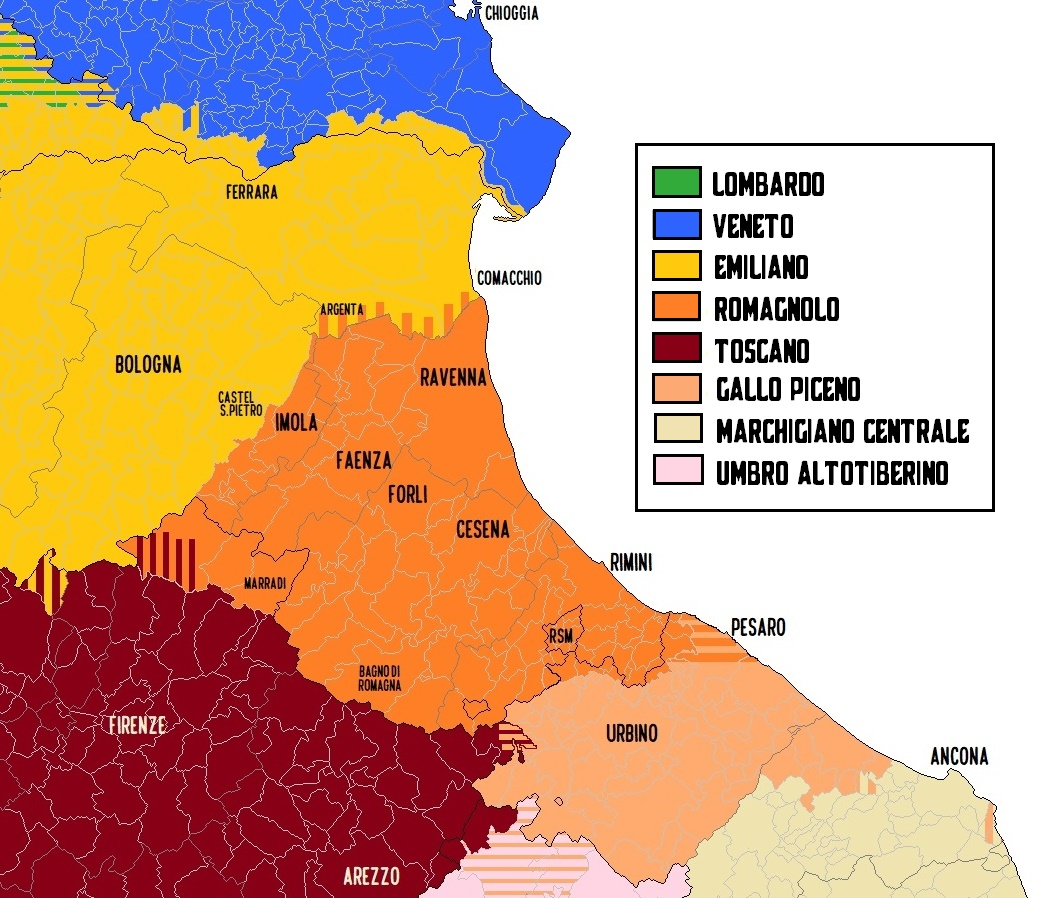
Language map of Romagna, Romagnol is marked in orange.
