= Languages of Somaliland =

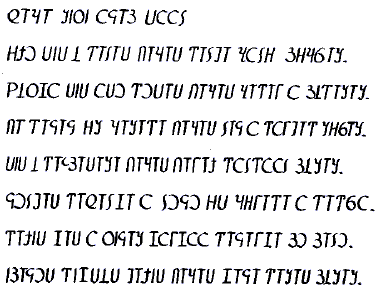
- Borama Scripts note inscribed the three official languages of Somaliland
- Official: Somali
- Semi-official: Arabic; English
- Minority: Italian
- Signed: Somali Sign Language
- Keyboard layout: QWERTY

The official language of Somaliland is Somali and remains the country's de facto national language and lingua franca. Arabic is recognized as the second language while English is also recognized as a spoken language and taught in schools. Italian also remains a widely spoken language due to colonial influence.

== History ==
Somali belongs to a set of languages called Lowland East Cushitic spoken by Somalis living in Somalia, Djibouti, and in adjacent territories. Eastern Cushitic is one branch of the Cushitic languages, which in turn are part of the great Afro-Asiatic stock. Arabic is the most widely spoken language of the Afro-Asiatic language family.

The main Somali dialect that is the most widely used is Northern Somali, a term applied to several sub-dialects, the speakers of which can understand each other easily. Standard Somali is spoken in most of Somalia and in adjacent territories (Djibouti, Ogaden, northeast Kenya), and is used by broadcasting stations in Somaliland.

Facility with language is highly valued in Somali society; the capability of a suitor, a warrior, or a political or religious leader is judged in part by his verbal adroitness. In such a society, oral poetry becomes an art, and one's ability to compose verse in one or more of its several forms enhances one's status. Speakers in political or religious assemblies and litigants in courts traditionally were expected to use poetry or poetic proverbs. Even everyday talk tended to have a terse, vivid, poetic style, characterised by carefully chosen words, condensed meaning, and alliteration.

In the pre-revolutionary period, English became dominant in the school system and in government. However, the overarching issue was the development of a socio-economic stratum based on mastery of a foreign language. The relatively small proportion of Somalis (less than 10 percent) with a grasp of such a language—preferably English—had access to government positions and the few managerial or technical jobs in modern private enterprises. Such persons became increasingly isolated from their nonliterate Somali-speaking brethren, but because the secondary schools and most government posts were in urban areas the socio-economic and linguistic distinction was in large part a rural-urban one.

Even before the 1969 revolution, Somalis had become aware of social stratification and the growing distance, based on language and literacy differences, between ordinary Somalis and those in government. The 1972 decision by the government of Somalia to designate an official Somali alphabet and require its use in government demolished the language barrier and an important obstacle to rapid literacy growth.

In the years following the institution of the Somali Latin script, Somali officials were required to learn the orthography and attempts were made to inculcate mass literacy — in 1973, among urban and rural sedentary Somalis, and in 1974-75, among nomads. Although a few texts existed in the new script before 1973, in most cases new books were prepared presenting the government's perspective on Somali history and development. Somali scholars also succeeded in developing a vocabulary to deal with a range of subjects from mathematics and physics to administration and ideology.

== See also ==
- Somaliland
- Somali language
- Administrative divisions of Somaliland
- Regions of Somaliland
- Districts of Somaliland
