= Abou Karamba Kassamba =

Gambian politician

Abou Karamba Kassama (died 2001) was a politician in The Gambia.

Kassama was elected as a member of the National Assembly of the Gambia representing the United Democratic Party in 1997. Kassama received about 58.14% of the vote.

Kassama died in a car accident in 2001 along with fellow politician Kunda Kamara, politician Buba Samura, and two others.
