= Languages of Eswatini =

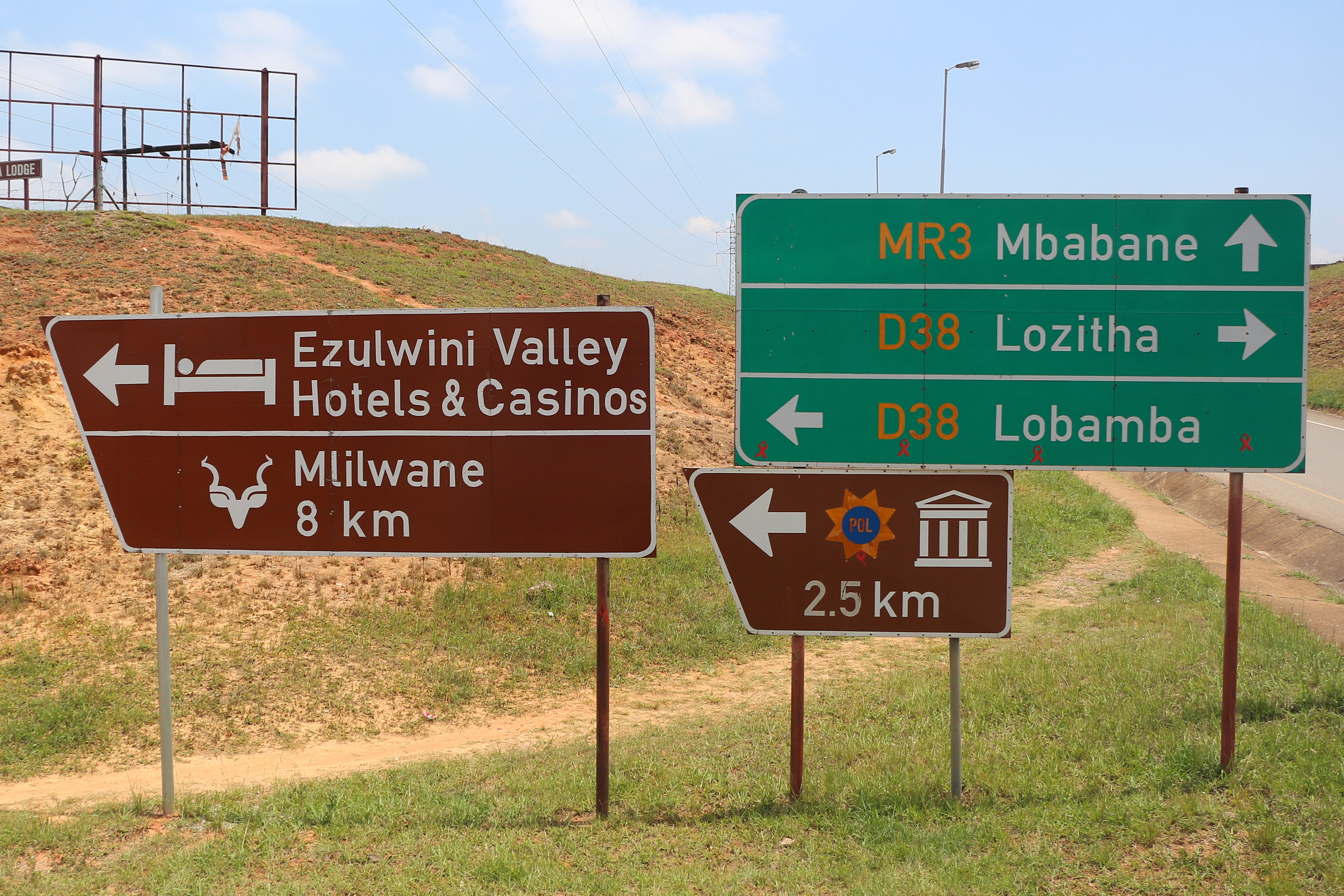
- Road signs in English in Eswatini, with Swazi placenames
- Official: Swazi, English
- Minority: Tsonga, Zulu
- Immigrant: Maore, Nyanja, Sotho
- Signed: Swazi Sign Language
- Source: Simons et al. 2018

Eswatini is home to two official languages. The native language is Siswati. Recent immigrant languages include Chichewa, Tsonga, and Zulu.

== National and official languages ==
Siswati, a Southern Bantu language, is the native language of Eswatini, and is spoken by approximately 95 percent of Swazis. Siswati and English are the country's two official languages, and proceedings of the Parliament of Eswatini take place in both languages.

Swazi language education is present in all national schools, and literacy in Swati — defined as the ability to read and write the language — is very high in Eswatini. Siswati is also used in mass media.

== Minority and immigrant languages ==
A minority of Swazi people, estimated to number 76,000 as of 1993, speak Zulu, one of the eleven official languages of South Africa. Tsonga, a Tswa–Ronga language and also an official language of South Africa, is spoken by 19,000 Swazis (as of 1993).

Chewa, an official language of Malawi, and Sotho (Sesotho or Southern Sotho), spoken mainly in Lesotho and the South African province of Free State, are immigrant languages with 5,700 and 4,700 speakers respectively. Shimaore is also an immigrant language and is spoken by 600 inhabitants.

== See also ==
- Languages of Lesotho
- Languages of Mozambique
- Languages of South Africa
