= Buba Samura =

Gambian politician (2000–2001)

- Died: 2001
- Occupation: Gambian politician

Buba Samura was a politician in The Gambia.

== Career ==
Samura contested the 1992 parliamentary elections as an independent candidate in the Eastern Kiang (Kiang East) constituency. However, he was not successful, losing to his opponent Wally S. M. Sanneh from the People's Progressive Party (PPP).

In the subsequent 1997 parliamentary elections, Samura ran as a candidate for the United Democratic Party (UDP), a party of which he was a founding member. He won the Eastern Kiang constituency by a narrow margin, defeating Ansumana Sanneh from the Alliance for Patriotic Reorientation and Construction (APRC).

Samura was elected as a member of the National Assembly of the Gambia in 1997.

Samura died in a car accident in 2001 alongside his fellow party member Abou Karamba Kassamba, the politician Kunda Kamara, and two others. The two opposition members were not honored with a state funeral, which caused discontent among their families, party members, and the general public.
