= Lesotho Sign Language =

Deaf sign language of Lesotho

- Native to: Lesotho
- Language family: BANZSL: South African Sign; Lesotho Sign Language

Language codes
- ISO 639-3: –
- Glottolog: leso1234

Lesotho Sign Language is a sign language used by the Deaf community in Lesotho. It is a variety of South African Sign Language.
