= List of countries and territories where Russian is an official language =

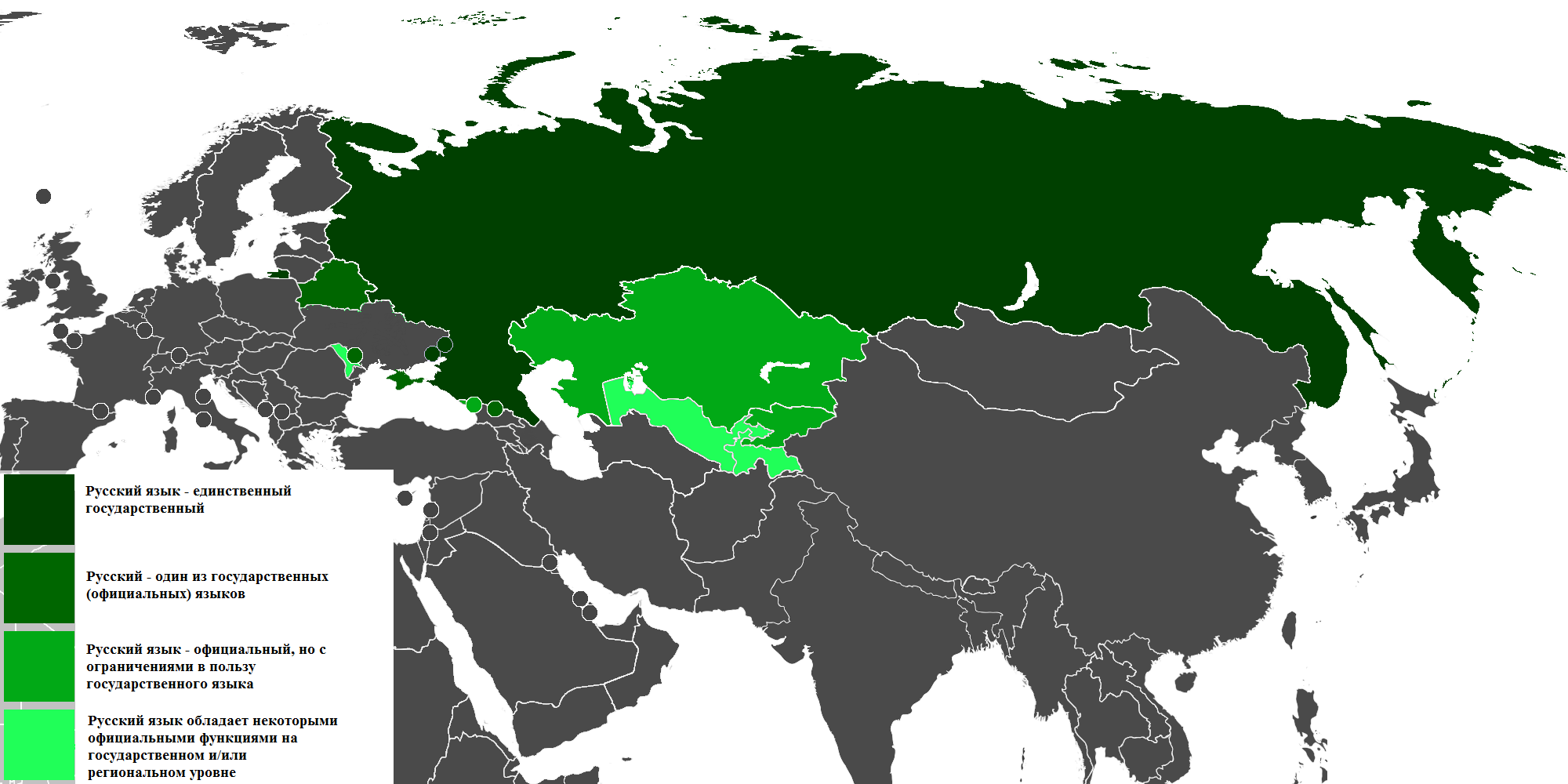
Countries where Russian is the sole state language, one of state languages, has official status, etc.

This is a list of countries and territories where Russian is an official language:

== Highest nationwide status or nationwide status of the state language ==
No.	Country	Status
1.	Russia	State language (государственный язык - gosudarstvennyy yazyk), the highest level in the country. Constitution: The Russian language shall be the state language throughout the Russian Federation. (Article 68) A few regions in Russia have an additional state language. (2nd level of importance). The Republics shall have the right to establish their own state languages. In the bodies of state authority and local self-government, state institutions of the republics they shall be used together with the state language of the Russian Federation. (Article 68 of the Constitution). Also there are "official languages" or "languages with official status" in regions. (3rd level of importance). See: Languages of Russia
2.	Belarus	State language (дзяржаўная мова / государственный язык), the highest level in the country. Russian is one of two state languages alongside Belarusian. Constitution: The Belarusian and Russian languages shall be the state languages of the Republic of Belarus. (Article 17)
De facto entities recognised as de jure sovereign states by at least one UN member state
a.	South Ossetia	State language, the highest level in the country. Constitution: The state languages in the Republic of South Ossetia are Ossetian and Russian languages. (Article 4)
De facto entities recognised only by other non-UN member states
b.	Transnistria	Official language, the highest level in the country. Constitution: The status of official language is given to "Moldovan" (Romanian), Russian and Ukrainian on an equal basis. (Article 12)

== Second highest nationwide status or nationwide status of the official language ==
No.	Country	Status
1.	Kazakhstan	The second highest nationwide status after the state language, but its constitutional status is not quite clear ("the Russian language is officially used"). Constitution: 1. The state language of the Republic of Kazakhstan shall be the Kazakh language. 2. In state institutions and local self-administrative bodies the Russian language is officially used on equal grounds alongside the Kazakh language. (Article 7) Implementation: Legal proceedings in Kazakhstan are carried out in the Kazakh language. Russian and other languages are used only when necessary. The Constitutional Council of Kazakhstan, the Law "On Languages in the Republic of Kazakhstan" and other decisions of the authorities have given the Russian language a very high status in practice. Russian is used routinely in business, government, and inter-ethnic communication, although Kazakh is slowly replacing it. Russian is the most spoken language. According to the 2009 census, 94% of people in Kazakhstan understood verbal Russian and 74% understood verbal Kazakh. People in Kazakhstan were fluent in Russian (84.8%), Kazakh (62%), English (7.7%).
2.	Kyrgyzstan	The second highest nationwide status after the state language ("the Russian language is used as an official one"). Constitution: 1. The state language of the Kyrgyz Republic shall be the Kyrgyz language. 2. In the Kyrgyz Republic, the Russian language is used as an official one. (Article 10)
3.	Tajikistan	Constitutional status of the "language of inter-ethnic communication", the second highest nationwide status after the state language. Constitution: The state language of Tajikistan is the Tajik language. The Russian language is a language of inter-ethnic communication. (Article 2) Implementation: The Russian language is used in the legislative process. The official publication of laws and regulations is carried out in Russian.
De facto entities recognised as de jure sovereign states by at least one UN member state
a.	Abkhazia	Constitutional status of the "language of the state and other institutions", the second highest nationwide status after the state language. Constitution: The state language of the Republic of Abkhazia shall be the Abkhaz language. The Russian language, equally with the Abkhazian language, shall be recognized as a language of the state and other institutions. (Article 6) Implementation: Lawmaking, legal proceedings and activities of all state and commercial institutions are carried out in the Abkhazian language. Russian is used only when necessary.

== Any other status defined by constitution, nationwide recognised minority language or similar status ==
No.	Country	Status
1.	Ukraine	Russian is explicitly mentioned in the constitution. Constitution: The state language in Ukraine is the Ukrainian language. The state ensures the comprehensive development and functioning of the Ukrainian language in all spheres of social life throughout Ukraine. In Ukraine, the free development, use and protection of Russian, other languages of national minorities of Ukraine, is guaranteed. (Article 10) Additionally recognised minority language by the European Charter for Regional or Minority Languages.
2.	Uzbekistan	Russian is explicitly mentioned in the Constitution, having the status of interethnic. Russian is also the second official de facto language in the country. Article 12: In the Republic of Uzbekistan any notary procedures shall be effected on the official language. Under request of citizens the text of document compiled by state notary or person acting as a notary shall be issued on Russian and if possible on other acceptable language.
3.	Moldova	Russian is explicitly mentioned in the constitution, having a status similar to the other minority languages recognized in Moldova (Bulgarian, Gagauz and Ukrainian). Romanian is the state language. Constitution: 1. The state language of the Republic of Moldova is the Romanian language based on the Latin alphabet. 2. The shall acknowledge and protect the right to the preservation, development and use of the Russian language and other languages spoken within the territory of the state. (Article 13)
4.	Armenia	Recognised minority language by the European Charter for Regional or Minority Languages.
5.	Bulgaria	Recognised minority language by the European Charter for Regional or Minority Languages.
6.	Poland	Recognised minority language by the European Charter for Regional or Minority Languages.
7.	Romania	Recognised minority language by the European Charter for Regional or Minority Languages.

== Status in dependencies or regions ==
No.	Country	Status
1.	Autonomous Republic of Crimea (Ukraine)	Status defined in one of the laws of Ukraine for the territory of Autonomous Republic of Crimea (Constitution of the Autonomous Republic of Crimea is one of the laws of Ukraine adopted by the Ukrainian parliament) Article 10. Securing Application and Development of Official Language, Russian, Crimean Tatar and Other Ethnic Groups’ Languages in the Autonomous Republic of Crimea: 1. In the Autonomous Republic of Crimea, along with the official language, the application and development, use and protection of Russian, Crimean Tatar and other ethnic groups’ languages shall be secured.; 2. In the Autonomous Republic of Crimea, Russian, being the language spoken by the majority of population and the language acceptable for purposes of interethnic communication, shall be used in all spheres of public life.; 3. In the Autonomous Republic of Crimea, citizens shall be guaranteed the right to be educated in their native language at children’s preschool establishments, to learn the native language, to be taught in the native language at educational establishments of state, republican and/or municipal form of ownership or through ethnic cultural societies or in accordance with the procedure established by Ukrainian legislation and the statutory acts of the Supreme Rada of the Autonomous Republic of Crimea within its terms of reference.; Article 11. Language of Documents Certifying Citizen’s Status in the Autonomous Republic of Crimea Pursuant to Ukrainian legislation, any and all official documents in the Autonomous Republic of Crimea certifying the citizen’s status, such as the identity card, work record card, educational level evidences, birth certificate, marriage certificate and others, shall be executed in Ukrainian and Russian and, upon request of a citizen, also in Crimean Tatar. Article 12. Language of Legal Procedure, Notarial Procedure, Administrative Offence Procedure and Legal Assistance in the Autonomous Republic of Crimea Pursuant to the Ukrainian legislation now in force, the language of legal procedure, notarial procedure, administrative offence procedure and legal assistance in the Autonomous Republic of Crimea shall be Ukrainian or, upon request of a participant in a respective procedure, Russian, as the language spoken by the majority of the population of the Autonomous Republic of Crimea. Any and all other matters of application of languages in the above spheres of activity in the Autonomous Republic of Crimea shall be regulated by Ukrainian laws. Article 13. Working Language of Post, Telegraph and Services Sector Enterprises, Establishments and Organisations in the Autonomous Republic of Crimea: 1. In the Autonomous Republic of Crimea, post and telegraph correspondence from individuals, public, republican, non-government and other bodies, enterprises, establishments and organisations shall be accepted for sending if executed in Ukrainian or Russian.; 2. Used in all consumers services (municipal services, public transport, public health and others) and at services sector enterprises, establishments and organisations shall be Ukrainian or Russian or any other language acceptable for parties.
2.	Gagauzia (Moldova)	Law of Moldova "On the special legal status of Gagauzia".
3.	Administrative-Territorial Units of the Left Bank of the Dniester (Moldova)	Law of Moldova "On the main provisions of the special legal status of localities on the left Bank of the Dniester river (Transnistria)".
4.	8 communes (Romania)	Law No. 215/2001, adopted by decision No. 1206 on 27 November 2001.

== See also ==
- Geographical distribution of Russian speakers

By ISO 639-3 code
Enter an ISO code to find the corresponding language article.
