= Gambian Sign Language =

National sign language of Gambia

- Native to: Gambia
- Language family: French Sign: Dutch Sign; Gambian Sign Language

Language codes
- ISO 639-3: None (mis)
- Glottolog: gamb1259
- IETF: dse-GM

Gambian Sign Language is a national sign language used by the deaf community in The Gambia. The only school for deaf children in the Gambia, St John's School for the Deaf, was set up by a Catholic priest from Ireland. Dutch Sign Language was introduced to the school along with British Sign Language which developed into Gambian Sign Language, incorporating some indigenous gestures used by the general population. Unlike much of West Africa, American Sign Language was not introduced to the Gambia until much later so the deaf community is not familiar with American Sign Language.
