= Alan Patten =

Professor at Princeton University

- Awards: APSA First Book Prize in Political Theory; C.B. Macpherson Prize

Academic background
- Education: University of Oxford (PhD)
- Thesis: Hegel's Idea of Freedom (1995)
- Doctoral advisor: Michael E. Rosen
- Other advisors: G. A. Cohen, Raymond Geuss, Raymond Plant, Michael Inwood

Academic work
- Era: Contemporary Philosophy
- Discipline: Political Philosophy
- Institutions: Princeton University
- Website: https://politics.princeton.edu/people/alan-patten

Alan Warren Patten is a Howard Harrison and Gabrielle Snyder Beck professor of political philosophy and the Director of the University Center for Human Values at Princeton University.

== Life and works ==
He earned a B.A. from McGill University, an M.A. from the University of Toronto, and both an M.Phil. and a D.Phil. (1996) from the University of Oxford. He has taught at McGill University and the University of Exeter, and was a visiting scholar at the Syarif Hidayatullah State Islamic University Jakarta.

Alan's first book, Hegel's Idea of Freedom, published in 2002 was the winner of APSA First Book Prize in Political Theory and the C.B. Macpherson Prize awarded by the Canadian Political Science Association.

=== Selected publications ===
- Patten, Alan (2002). Hegel's Idea of Freedom. doi:10.1093/0199251568.001.0001. ISBN 0-19-925156-8.
- Patten, Alan (2014). Equal Recognition: The Moral Foundations of Minority Rights (1 ed.). Princeton University Press. doi:10.23943/princeton/9780691159379.001.0001. ISBN 978-0-691-15937-9.

==== Editorials ====
- Kymlicka, Will; Patten, Alan, eds. (2003-05-29). Language Rights and Political Theory. Oxford University PressOxford. doi:10.1093/oso/9780199262908.001.0001. ISBN 978-0-19-926290-8.
