= Demographics of the Gambia =

Demographics of The Gambia
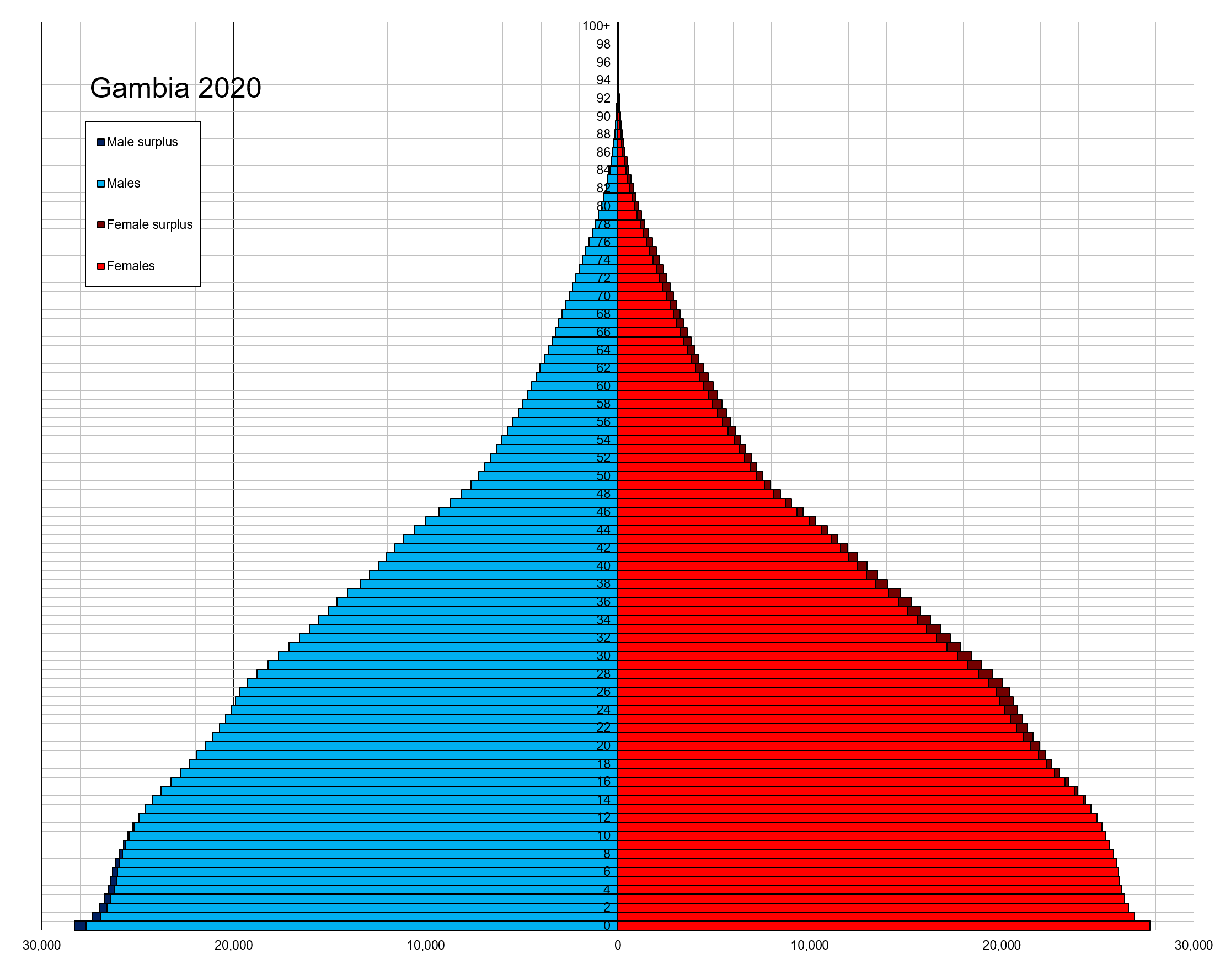
- Gambia population pyramid in 2020
- Population: 2,639,916 (2021 est.)
- Density: 176.1/sq km (2013)
- Growth rate: 38.3%
- Birth rate: 29.4 births/1,000 population (2017 est.)
- Death rate: 7 deaths/1,000 population (2017 est.)
- Life expectancy: 65.1 (2017 est.)
  - male: 62.8 (2017 est.)
  - female: 67.5 (2017 est.)
- Fertility rate: 3.52 children born/woman (2017 est.)
- Infant mortality: 60.2 deaths/1,000 live births (2017 est.)

Age structure
- 0–14 years: 37.44% (2017 est.)
- 15–64 years: 59.08% (2017 est.)
- 65 and over: 3.48% (2017 est.)

Sex ratio
- Total: 0.98 (2013)
- At birth: 1.03 (2013 est.)
- Under 15: 1.01 (2013 est.)
- 15–64 years: 0.96 (2013 est.)
- 65 and over: 0.90 (2013 est.)

Nationality
- Nationality: Noun: Gambian
- Major ethnic: African (99%) (2003)
- Minor ethnic: Non-African (1%) (2003)

Language
- Official: English
- Spoken: Mandinka, Wolof, Fula

The demographic characteristics of the population of The Gambia are known through national censuses, conducted in ten-year intervals and analyzed by The Gambian Bureau of Statistics (GBOS) since 1963. The latest census was conducted in 2013. The population of The Gambia at the 2013 census was 1.8 million. The population density is 176.1 per square kilometer, and the overall life expectancy in The Gambia is 64.1 years. Since the first census of 1963, the population of The Gambia has increased every ten years by an average of 43.2 percent. Since 1950s, the birth rate has constantly exceeded the death rate; the natural growth rate is positive. The Gambia is in the second stage of demographic transition. In terms of age structure, The Gambia is dominated by 15- to 24-year-old segment (57.6%). The median age of the population is 19.9 years, and the gender ratio of the total population is 0.98 males per female.

== Population ==
Census population
Year	Pop.	±% p.a.
1963	315,486	—
1973	493,499	+4.58%
1983	687,817	+3.38%
1993	1,038,145	+4.20%
2003	1,360,681	+2.74%
2013	1,882,450	+3.30%
2024	2,422,712	+2.32%
Source: The Gambia Bureau of Statistics

With a population of 1.88 million in 2013, The Gambia ranks 149th in the world by population. Its population density is 176.1 inhabitants per square kilometer (456 inhabitants per square mile). The overall life expectancy in The Gambia is 64.1 years. The total fertility rate of 3.98 is one of the highest in the world. Since 1950, the United Nations (UN) estimated the birth rate exceeds the death rate. The Gambia Bureau of Statistics (GBOS) estimates the population of The Gambia is expected to reach 3.6 million in 20 years. The population of The Gambia has increased each census, starting with 315 thousand in 1963 to 1.8 million in 2013. The GBOS predicted the reason for the increase from 2003 to 2013 was more coverage in the latter census compared to the former's.

== Vital statistics ==
Registration of vital events in Gambia is not complete. The Population Department of the United Nations prepared the following estimates.

	Mid-year population	Live births	Deaths	Natural change	Crude birth rate (per 1000)	Crude death rate (per 1000)	Natural change (per 1000)	Total fertility rate (TFR)	Infant mortality (per 1000 live births)	Life expectancy (in years)
1950	307,000	15,000	10,000	5,000	49.6	32.2	17.4	6.35	174.0	31.76
1951	315,000	16,000	10,000	6,000	50.1	31.8	18.4	6.35	173.1	31.87
1952	323,000	16,000	10,000	6,000	50.5	31.5	19.0	6.35	171.6	32.08
1953	331,000	17,000	10,000	6,000	50.7	31.2	19.5	6.35	170.1	32.43
1954	340,000	17,000	11,000	7,000	50.9	31.1	19.8	6.34	168.8	32.67
1955	349,000	18,000	11,000	7,000	51.0	30.9	20.0	6.33	167.6	32.88
1956	359,000	18,000	11,000	7,000	51.0	30.9	20.2	6.32	166.5	33.05
1957	368,000	19,000	11,000	8,000	51.0	30.4	20.6	6.30	163.8	33.53
1958	378,000	19,000	11,000	8,000	51.0	29.9	21.1	6.29	161.0	34.08
1959	389,000	20,000	11,000	8,000	50.9	29.4	21.4	6.27	158.4	34.59
1960	400,000	20,000	12,000	9,000	50.7	28.9	21.8	6.25	155.8	35.10
1961	411,000	21,000	12,000	9,000	50.6	28.5	22.1	6.23	153.3	35.57
1962	422,000	21,000	12,000	9,000	50.4	28.1	22.3	6.21	150.9	35.99
1963	434,000	22,000	12,000	10,000	50.1	27.6	22.5	6.20	148.6	36.50
1964	446,000	22,000	12,000	10,000	49.8	27.1	22.6	6.20	146.3	36.95
1965	459,000	23,000	12,000	10,000	49.4	26.6	22.8	6.19	143.9	37.45
1966	472,000	23,000	12,000	11,000	48.9	26.1	22.8	6.18	141.6	37.90
1967	485,000	24,000	12,000	11,000	48.6	25.6	23.0	6.21	139.3	38.43
1968	499,000	24,000	13,000	12,000	48.4	25.1	23.2	6.22	137.0	38.87
1969	514,000	25,000	13,000	12,000	48.2	24.7	23.5	6.25	134.7	39.35
1970	529,000	25,000	13,000	13,000	47.9	24.2	23.7	6.26	132.4	39.87
1971	544,000	26,000	13,000	13,000	47.8	23.7	24.0	6.28	130.1	40.35
1972	561,000	27,000	13,000	14,000	47.8	23.2	24.6	6.32	127.7	40.92
1973	577,000	28,000	13,000	14,000	47.8	22.8	24.9	6.37	125.3	41.39
1974	595,000	28,000	13,000	15,000	47.6	22.4	25.2	6.38	122.9	41.95
1975	613,000	29,000	14,000	15,000	47.4	22.1	25.3	6.41	120.4	42.44
1976	632,000	30,000	14,000	16,000	47.3	21.8	25.5	6.43	117.9	43.04
1977	652,000	31,000	14,000	17,000	47.1	21.6	25.5	6.43	115.5	43.44
1978	673,000	31,000	14,000	17,000	46.9	21.5	25.4	6.42	114.0	43.58
1979	695,000	32,000	14,000	18,000	46.8	20.9	25.9	6.41	110.9	44.56
1980	719,000	33,000	15,000	19,000	46.7	20.6	26.2	6.40	108.5	45.15
1981	743,000	35,000	16,000	19,000	46.7	21.0	25.8	6.40	106.1	44.48
1982	768,000	36,000	15,000	21,000	46.8	19.8	26.9	6.39	103.7	46.38
1983	796,000	37,000	15,000	22,000	46.6	19.5	27.1	6.38	101.2	46.92
1984	825,000	38,000	16,000	22,000	46.5	19.1	27.4	6.37	98.7	47.49
1985	856,000	40,000	16,000	24,000	46.4	18.6	27.8	6.34	96.1	48.19
1986	889,000	41,000	16,000	25,000	46.4	18.1	28.3	6.33	93.6	48.71
1987	924,000	42,000	16,000	26,000	46.2	17.6	28.7	6.29	91.1	49.41
1988	961,000	44,000	16,000	28,000	46.1	17.1	29.0	6.26	88.7	50.05
1989	1,000,000	46,000	17,000	29,000	45.8	16.6	29.2	6.24	86.3	50.64
1990	1,041,000	47,000	17,000	31,000	45.7	16.1	29.6	6.22	84.0	51.32
1991	1,084,000	49,000	17,000	32,000	45.6	15.5	30.1	6.17	81.8	52.13
1992	1,127,000	51,000	17,000	34,000	45.4	15.0	30.4	6.11	79.5	52.94
1993	1,168,000	53,000	17,000	36,000	45.1	14.4	30.7	6.04	77.3	53.75
1994	1,206,000	54,000	17,000	38,000	45.0	13.7	31.3	6.04	75.0	54.72
1995	1,242,000	56,000	16,000	39,000	44.7	13.2	31.5	6.01	72.8	55.46
1996	1,279,000	57,000	16,000	40,000	44.3	12.8	31.5	5.96	70.6	56.01
1997	1,317,000	58,000	17,000	42,000	44.1	12.6	31.5	5.92	68.7	56.06
1998	1,356,000	60,000	17,000	43,000	44.1	12.3	31.8	5.93	66.3	56.55
1999	1,396,000	61,000	17,000	44,000	43.6	12.0	31.6	5.87	64.5	56.82
2000	1,438,000	62,000	17,000	45,000	43.1	11.8	31.3	5.80	62.1	56.94
2001	1,479,000	64,000	17,000	46,000	42.9	11.7	31.2	5.75	60.1	57.04
2002	1,522,000	65,000	18,000	47,000	42.5	11.6	30.9	5.73	58.1	57.08
2003	1,566,000	66,000	18,000	49,000	42.3	11.2	31.0	5.70	56.1	57.59
2004	1,612,000	68,000	18,000	51,000	42.2	10.8	31.4	5.71	54.2	58.09
2005	1,660,000	70,000	18,000	53,000	42.1	10.6	31.6	5.72	52.4	58.39
2006	1,711,000	73,000	17,000	55,000	42.4	10.1	32.2	5.76	50.5	59.06
2007	1,765,000	74,000	17,000	57,000	42.1	9.9	32.2	5.73	48.7	59.39
2008	1,821,000	76,000	17,000	59,000	41.8	9.4	32.3	5.71	47.0	60.08
2009	1,878,000	78,000	17,000	61,000	41.5	9.2	32.3	5.69	45.4	60.43
2010	1,937,000	80,000	17,000	62,000	41.1	8.9	32.1	5.67	43.9	60.72
2011	1,998,000	81,000	17,000	64,000	40.7	8.5	32.2	5.64	42.3	61.53
2012	2,061,000	83,000	17,000	66,000	40.1	8.2	32.0	5.59	40.9	62.10
2013	2,125,000	84,000	17,000	67,000	39.4	8.1	31.3	5.51	39.5	62.11
2014	2,189,000	84,000	17,000	67,000	38.5	7.9	30.6	5.42	38.2	62.27
2015	2,253,000	85,000	17,000	67,000	37.6	7.7	29.8	5.31	36.9	62.49
2016	2,317,000	85,000	17,000	68,000	36.6	7.5	29.1	5.20	35.7	63.01
2017	2,381,000	85,000	18,000	68,000	35.7	7.4	28.3	5.09	34.5	63.00
2018	2,445,000	85,000	18,000	68,000	34.9	7.3	27.6	4.97	33.4	63.04
2019	2,509,000	86,000	18,000	69,000	34.3	7.0	27.3	4.87	32.4	63.76
2020	2,516,000	79,000	17,000	62,000	31.5	6.8	24.7	4.25	32.5	64.4
2021	2,576,000	80,000	18,000	62,000	31.2	7.0	24.2	4.17	31.5	63.8
2022	2,636,000	81,000	17,000	64,000	30.8	6.6	24.1	4.08	30.5	64.9
2023	2,698,000	82,000	17,000	65,000	30.4	6.3	24.1	4.01	29.5	65.9

=== Demographic and Health Surveys ===
Population, fertility rate and net reproduction rate, United Nations estimates

Fertility Rate TFR (Wanted Fertility Rate) and CBR (Crude Birth Rate):

Year	CBR (Total)	TFR (Total)	CBR (Urban)	TFR (Urban)	CBR (Rural)	TFR (Rural)
2013	40.5	5.6 (4.7)	37.7	4.7 (4.1)	43.4	6.8 (5.6)
2019-20	34.4	4.4 (4.0)	32.5	3.9 (3.6)	38.9	5.9 (5.3)

View source data.
View source data.
View source data.
View source data.

Structure of the population (DHS 2013) (males 23,904, females 25,649, total 49,553) :

Age group	Male (%)	Female (%)	Total (%)
0–4	18.5	16.4	17.4
5–9	16.6	15.3	15.9
10–14	12.8	12.5	12.6
15–19	10.3	10.4	10.3
20–24	8.5	9.1	8.8
25–29	6.8	8.0	7.4
30–34	5.5	6.5	6.0
35–39	4.5	4.7	4.6
40–44	3.8	3.3	3.5
45–49	2.9	2.4	2.6
50–54	2.1	4.1	3.1
55–59	1.5	1.9	1.7
60–64	2.3	1.9	2.1
65–69	1.5	1.2	1.3
70–74	1.0	0.9	1.0
75–79	0.7	0.5	0.6
80+	0.8	1.0	0.9

Age group	Male (%)	Female (%)	Total (%)
0–14	47.9	44.2	45.9
15–64	48.1	52.2	50.3
65+	4.0	3.6	3.8

Population Estimates by Sex and Age Group (30.XII.2015) (Source: Integrated Household Survey (IHS) 2015/2016.):

Age group	Male	Female	Total	%
Total	915 357	1 007 593	1 922 950	100
0–4	155 654	155 502	311 156	16.18
5–9	150 122	147 966	298 089	15.50
10–14	115 261	113 727	228 988	11.91
15–19	87 274	111 093	198 367	10.32
20–24	76 050	104 429	180 479	9.39
25–29	62 431	89 237	151 669	7.89
30–34	57 532	70 222	127 754	6.64
35–39	49 913	59 248	109 161	5.68
40–44	39 032	42 666	81 698	4.25
45–49	32 235	29 522	61 757	3.21
50–54	27 286	25 441	52 727	2.74
55–59	18 075	17 685	35 759	1.86
60–64	16 034	14 121	30 155	1.57
65+	28 457	26 734	55 191	2.87
Age group	Male	Female	Total	Percent
0–14	421 037	417 195	838 232	43.59
15–64	465 863	563 664	1 029 527	53.54
65+	28 457	26 734	55 191	2.87

Fertility data as of 2019-20 (DHS Program):

Local Government Area	Total fertility rate	Percentage of women age 15–49 currently pregnant	Mean number of children ever born to women age 40–49
Banjul	3.1	5.3	4.2
Kanifing	3.3	5.7	4.5
Brikama	4.1	6.9	5.7
Mansakonko	5.4	9.7	7.1
Kerewan	5.4	8.2	6.9
Kuntaur	6.4	11.9	7.2
Janjanbureh	5.7	8.7	7.0
Basse	5.7	9.6	6.5

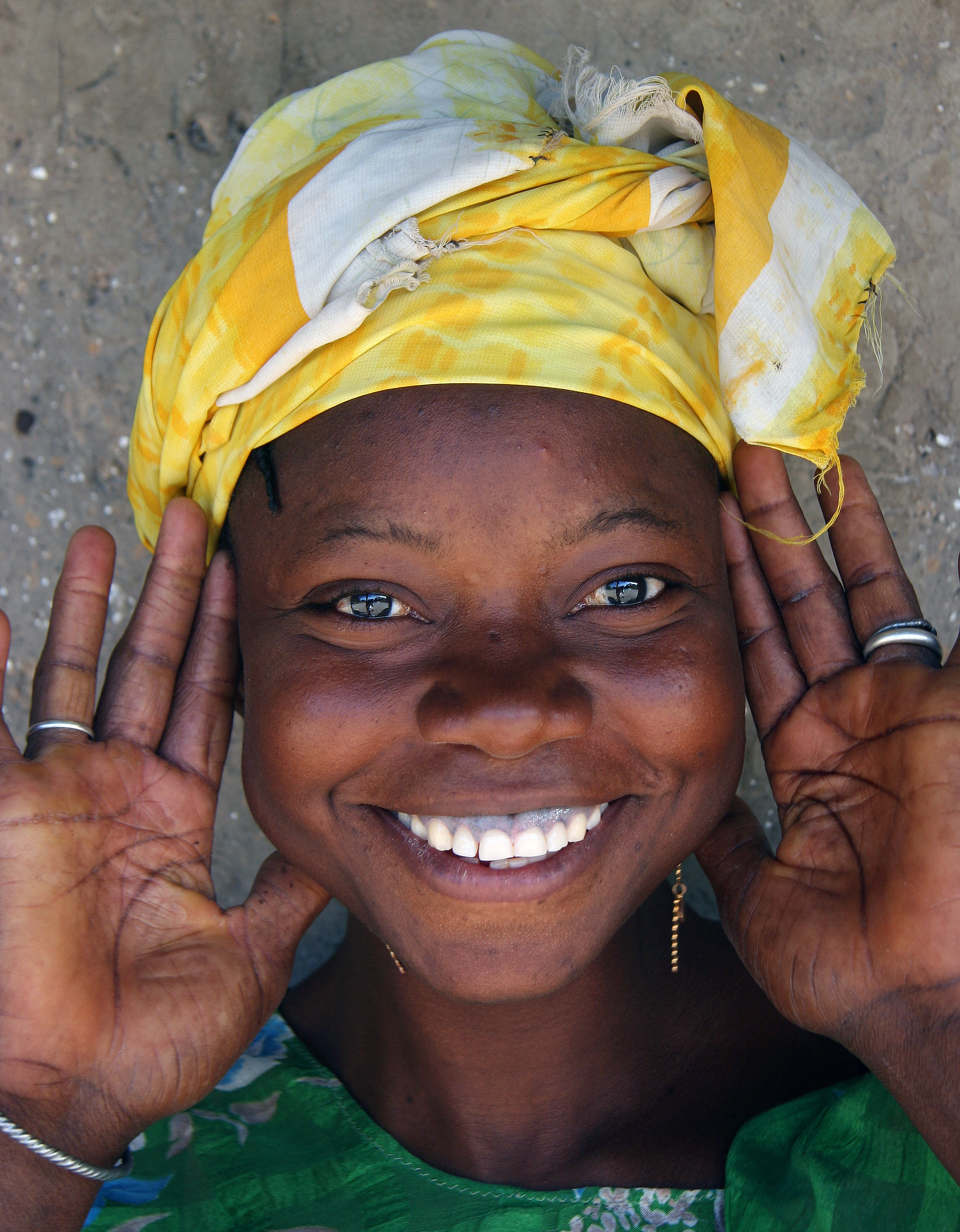
Gambian girl

=== Life expectancy ===
Period	Life expectancy in Years
1950–1955	30.24
1955–1960	▲31.52
1960–1965	▲32.79
1965–1970	▲35.78
1970–1975	▲40.04
1975–1980	▲44.21
1980–1985	▲48.20
1985–1990	▲51.33
1990–1995	▲52.85
1995–2000	▲54.91
2000–2005	▲56.92
2005–2010	▲58.83
2010–2015	▲60.31

== Ethnic groups ==
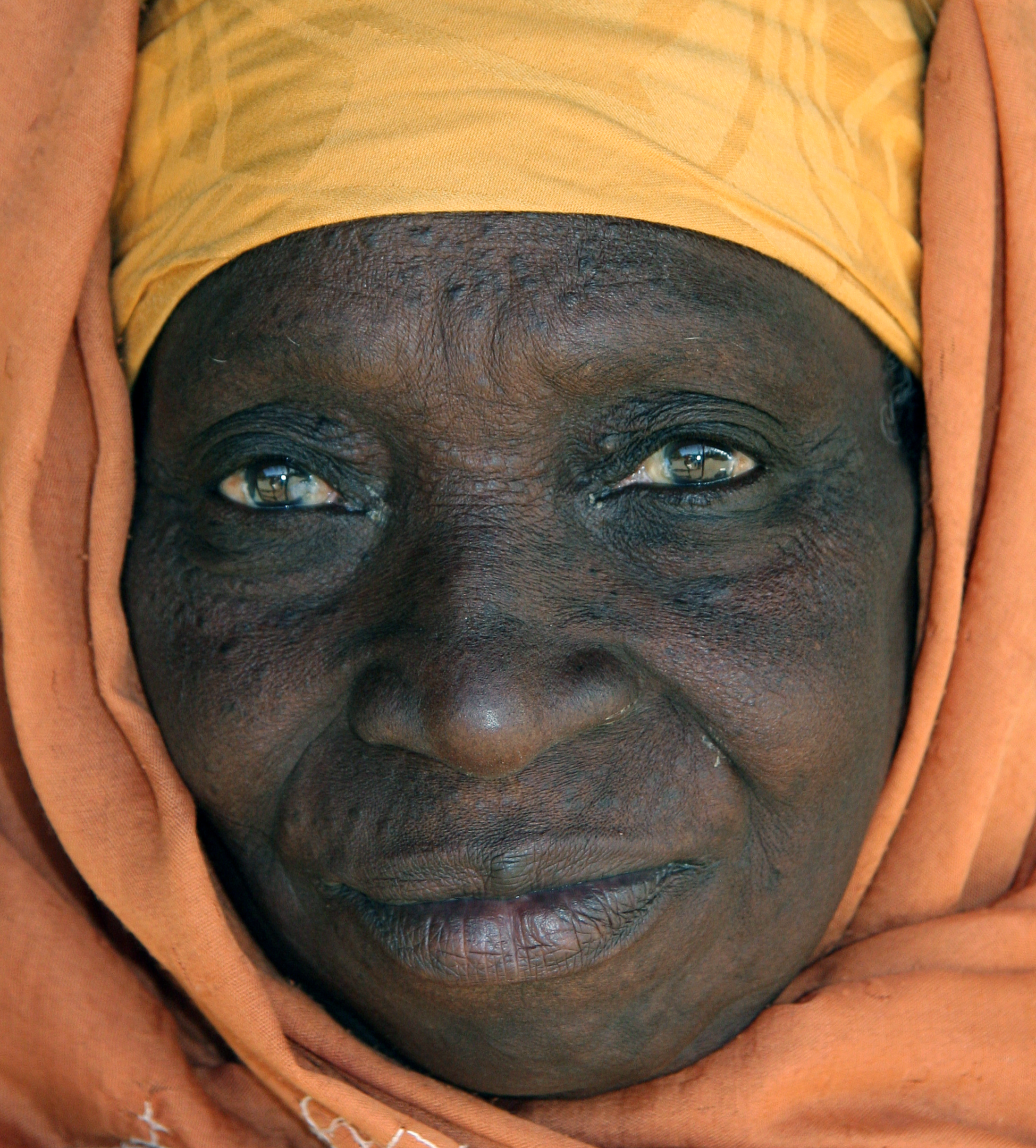
Elderly Gambian woman, January 2008, The Gambia.

Population of Gambia according to ethnic group 1973-2023
Ethnic group	census 1973		census 1983		census 1993		census 2003		census 2013		census 2023	
Ethnic group	Number	%	Number	%	Number	%	Number	%	Number	%	Number	%
Mandinka/Jahanka	186,241	42.3	251,997	40.8	353,840	39.5	446,914	35.9	600,165	34.4	793,300	34.4
Fula/Tukulor/Lorobo	79,994	18.2	117,092	19.0	168,284	18.8	272,54	21.9	420,206	24.1	576,500	25.0
Wolof	69,291	15.7	84,404	13.7	130,546	14.6	179,890	14.5	258,065	14.8	355,100	15.4
Jola	41,988	9.5	64,494	10.4	95,262	10.6	141,360	11.4	182,807	10.5	219,100	9.5
Sarahule	38,478	8.7	51,137	8.3	79,690	8.9	101,347	8.1	142,606	8.2	189,100	8.2
Serere	9,229	2.1	15,511	2.5	24,710	2.8	37,979	3.1	53,567	3.1	66,900	2.9
Krio (Creole)	5,596	1.3	10,741	1.7	7,458	0.8	24,492	2.0	8,477	0.5	9,200	0.4
Manjago	1,722	0.4	3,035	0.5	6,194	0.7	13,043	1.0	32,408	1.9	39,200	1.7
Bambara	4,386	1.0	5,032	0.8	16,550	1.8	6,556	0.5	22,583	1.3	27,700	1.2
Other/not stated	3,791	0.9	13,796	2.2	13,601	1.5	19,938	1.6	25,548	1.5	30,000	1.3
Total	440,716		617,239		896,135		1,243,873		1,746,432		2,306,066	
The figures refer to the Gambian population only. Foreigners are excluded.

== See also ==
- Languages of the Gambia
- Religion in the Gambia
