= Official language =

Language given special status in a country or territory

An official language is defined by the Cambridge English Dictionary as "the language or one of the languages that is accepted by a country's government, is taught in schools, used in the courts of law, etc." Depending on the decree, the establishment of an official language might also place restrictions on the use of other languages in those capacities. Designated rights of an official language can be created in written form or by historic usage.

An official language is recognized by 178 countries, of which 101 recognize more than one. The government of Italy made Italian their official language in 1999, and some nations (such as Mexico and Australia) have never declared de jure official languages at the national level. Other nations have declared non-indigenous official languages.

Many of the world's constitutions mention one or more official or national languages. Some countries use the official language designation to empower indigenous groups by giving them access to the government in their native languages. In countries that do not formally designate an official language, a de facto national language usually evolves. English is the most common official or co-official language, with recognized status in 52 countries. Arabic, French, and Spanish are official or co-official languages in several countries.

An official language that is also an indigenous language is called endoglossic, one that is not indigenous is exoglossic. An instance is Nigeria, which has three endoglossic official languages. By this, the country aims to protect the indigenous languages although at the same time recognising the English language as its lingua franca. In spatial terms, indigenous (endoglossic) languages are mostly employed in the function of official languages in Europe and Asia, while mainly non-indigenous (exoglossic) languages are official in the rest of the world.

== History ==
Around 500 BC, when Darius the Great annexed Mesopotamia to the Achaemenid Empire, he chose a form of the Aramaic language (the so-called Official Aramaic or Imperial Aramaic) as the vehicle for written communication between the different regions of the vast empire with its different peoples and languages. Aramaic script was widely employed from Egypt in the southwest to Bactria and Sogdiana in the northeast. Texts were dictated in the native dialects and written down in Aramaic, and then read out again in the native language at the places they were received.

Qin Shi Huang, the first emperor of China, standardized the written language of China after unifying the country in 221 BC. Literary Chinese would remain the standard written language for the next 2000 years. Standardization of the spoken language received less political attention, and Mandarin developed on an ad hoc basis from the dialects of the various imperial capitals until being officially standardized in the early twentieth century.

== Statistics ==
The following languages are official (de jure or de facto) in two or more sovereign states. In some cases, a language may be defined as different languages in different countries. Examples are Hindi and Urdu, Malay and Indonesian, Serbian and Croatian, Persian and Tajik.

- English: 58 UN states and 31 dependencies
- French: 26 UN states and 10 dependencies
- Arabic: 23 UN states and Palestine, 2 non-UN states on the same territory, and 1 dependency
- Spanish: 20 UN states and 1 dependency
- Portuguese: 9 UN states and 1 dependency
- German: 6 UN states
- Russian: 5 UN and 3 unrecognized states
- Serbo-Croatian: 4 UN states and 1 partially recognized state on the same territory
- Malay: 4 UN states and 1 dependency
- Swahili: 4 UN states (5 counting Comorian)
- Italian: 3 UN states and Vatican City
- Persian: 3 UN states and 1 dependency
- Dutch: 3 UN states (4 counting Afrikaans)
- Somali: 3 UN states and 1 unrecognized state on the same territory
- Sotho: 3 UN states
- Standard Chinese (Mandarin): 2 UN states and Taiwan
- Tamil: 2 UN states and 2 States in India
- Hindustani: 2 UN states (counting Fijian Hindi) and 10 states in India
- Bengali: 2 UN states (counting Bangladesh) and 1 state in India
- Greek: 2 UN states
- Turkish: 2 UN states and 1 partially recognized state

Some countries—like Australia and the United Kingdom—have no official language recognized as such at a national level. On the other extreme, Bolivia officially recognizes 37 languages, the most of any country in the world. Second to Bolivia is India with 22 official languages. Zimbabwe has 16 official languages, Mali has 13, and South Africa is the country with the fifth lead with 12 official languages that all have equal status; Bolivia gives primacy to Spanish, and India gives primacy to English and Hindi .

== Political alternatives ==
The selection of an official language (or the lack thereof) is often contentious. An alternative to having a single official language is "official multilingualism", where a government recognizes multiple official languages. Under this system, all government services are available in all official languages. Each citizen may choose their preferred language when conducting business. Most countries are multilingual and many are officially multilingual. India, Taiwan, Canada, the Philippines, Belgium, Switzerland, and the European Union are examples of official multilingualism. This has been described as controversial and, in some other areas where it has been proposed, the idea has been rejected. It has also been described as necessary for the recognition of different groups or as an advantage for the country in presenting itself to outsiders.

== Official languages by country and territory ==
=== Afghanistan ===
According to the Taliban, the Afghan government gives equal status to Pashto and Dari as official languages.

=== Azerbaijan ===
Article 21 of Azerbaijani Constitution designates the official language of the Republic of Azerbaijan as Azerbaijani Language.

=== Bangladesh ===
After the independence of Bangladesh in 1971, Sheikh Mujibur Rahman, the first President of Bangladesh adopted the policy of 'one state one language'. The de facto national language, Bengali, is the sole official language of Bangladesh according to the third article of the Constitution of Bangladesh. The government of Bangladesh introduced the Bengali Language Implementation Act, 1987 to ensure the mandatory use of Bengali in all government affairs.

=== Belarus ===
Belarusian and Russian have official status in the Republic of Belarus.

=== Belgium ===
Belgium has three official languages: Dutch, French and German.

=== Bulgaria ===
Bulgarian is the sole official language in Bulgaria.

=== Canada ===
Following the Constitution Act, 1982 the (federal) Government of Canada gives equal status to English and French as official languages. The Province of New Brunswick is also officially bilingual, as is Yukon. Nunavut has four official languages: English, French, Inuktitut and Inuinnaqtun. The Northwest Territories has eleven official languages: Chipewyan/Dené, Cree, English, French, Gwich’in, Inuinnaqtun, Inuktitut, Inuvialuktun, North Slavey, South Slavey, and Tłı̨chǫ (Dogrib). All provinces, however, offer some necessary services in both English and French.

The Province of Quebec with the Official Language Act (Quebec) and Charter of the French Language defines French, the language of the majority of the population, as the official language of the provincial government.

=== Ethiopia ===
Ethiopia has five official languages (Amharic alone until 2020) Amharic, Oromo, Somali, Tigrinya, and Afar, but Amharic is the de facto sole official language which is used by the government for issuing driving licenses, business licenses, passport, and foreign diplomacy with the addition that Court documents are in Amharic, and the constitution is written in Amharic, making Amharic a higher official language in the country.

=== Finland ===
According to the Finnish constitution, Finnish and Swedish are the national languages of the republic, giving their speakers the right to communicate with, and receive official documents from, government authorities in either of the two languages in any part of the country – making those languages de facto official. Speakers of Sámi languages have those same rights in their native area (Sámi homeland).

=== Germany ===
Its minority languages include Sorbian (Upper Sorbian and Lower Sorbian), Romani, Danish and North Frisian, which are officially recognised.

=== Hong Kong ===
According to the Basic Law of Hong Kong and the Official Languages Ordinance, both Chinese and English are the official languages of Hong Kong with equal status. The variety of Chinese is not stipulated; however, Cantonese, being the language most commonly used by the majority of Hongkongers, forms the de facto standard. Similarly, Traditional Chinese characters are most commonly used in Hong Kong and form the de facto standard for written Chinese, however, there is an increasing presence of Simplified Chinese characters particularly in areas related to tourism. In government use, documents written using Traditional Chinese characters are authoritative over ones written with Simplified Chinese characters.

=== India ===
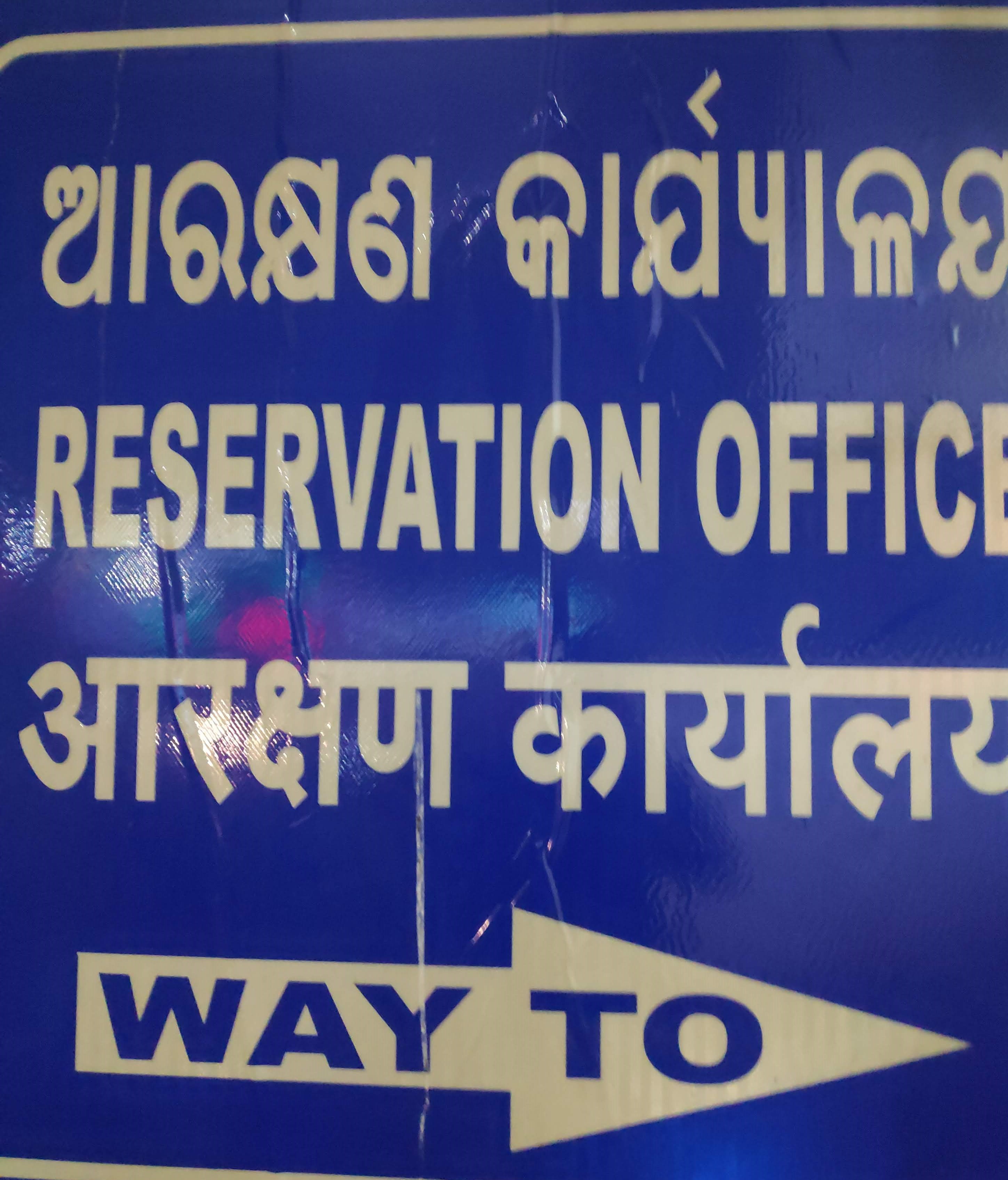
Trilingual signboard in Odia, English and Hindi in Odisha state of India

The Constitution of India (part 17) designates the official language of the Government of India as Hindi written in the Devanagari script. Although the original intentions of the constitution were to phase out English as an official language, provisions were provided so that "Parliament may by law provide for the use ... of ... the English language".

The Eighth Schedule of the Indian Constitution lists has 22 languages, which have been referred to as scheduled languages and given recognition, status and official encouragement. In addition, the Government of India has awarded the distinction of classical language to Tamil, Sanskrit, Kannada, Telugu, Malayalam, Bengali and Odia.

=== Indonesia ===
The official language of Indonesia is the Indonesian language (Bahasa Indonesia). Bahasa Indonesia is regulated in Chapter XV, 1945 Constitution of Indonesia.

=== Israel ===
On 19 July 2018, the Knesset passed a basic law under the title Israel as the Nation-State of the Jewish People, which defines Hebrew as "the State's language" and Arabic as a language with "a special status in the State" (article 4). The law further says that it should not be interpreted as compromising the status of the Arabic language in practice before the enactment of the basic law, namely, it preserves the status quo and changes the status of Hebrew and Arabic only nominally.

Before the enactment of the aforementioned basic law, the status of official language in Israel was determined by the 82nd paragraph of the "Palestine Order in Council" issued on 14 August 1922, for the British Mandate of Palestine, as amended in 1939:

"All Ordinances, official notices and official forms of the Government and all official notices of local authorities and municipalities in areas to be prescribed by order of the High Commissioner, shall be published in English, Arabic, and Hebrew."

This law, like most other laws of the British Mandate, was adopted in the State of Israel, subject to certain amendments published by the provisional legislative branch on 19 May 1948. The amendment states that:

"Any provision in the law requiring the use of the English language is repealed."

In most public schools, the main teaching language is Hebrew, English is taught as a second language, and most students learn a third language, usually Arabic but not necessarily. Other public schools have Arabic as their main teaching language, and they teach Hebrew as a second language and English as a third one. There are also bilingual schools which aim to teach both Hebrew and Arabic equally.

Some languages other than Hebrew and Arabic, such as English, Russian, Amharic, Yiddish and Ladino enjoy a somewhat special status but are not official languages. For instance, at least 5% of the broadcasting time of privately owned TV channels must be translated into Russian (a similar privilege is granted to Arabic), warnings must be translated to several languages, and signs are mostly trilingual (Hebrew, Arabic and English), and the government supports Yiddish and Ladino culture (alongside Hebrew culture and Arabic culture).

=== Latvia ===
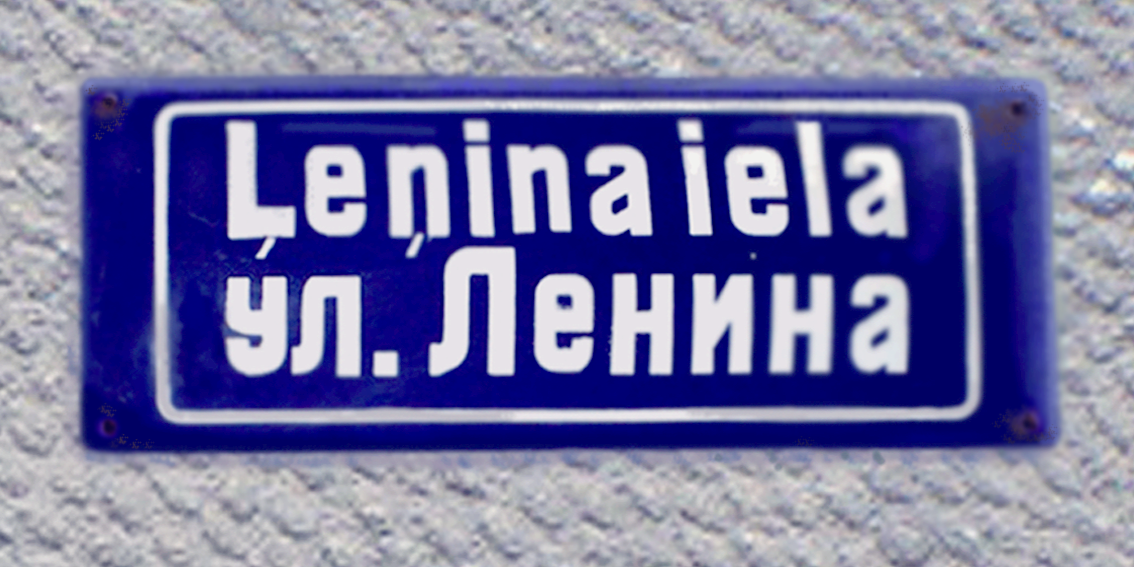
A former name sign on "Lenin Street" in the two official languages at the time of the 1945–1991 Soviet occupation of Latvia: Latvian (above) and Russian (below, in Cyrillic alphabet)

The Official Language Law recognizes Latvian as the sole official language of Latvia, while Latgalian is protected as "a historic variant of Latvian" and Livonian is recognized as "the language of the indigenous (autochthonous) population". Latvia also provides national minority education programmes in Russian, Polish, Hebrew, Ukrainian, Estonian, Lithuanian, and Belarusian. In 2012 there was a constitutional referendum on elevating Russian as a co-official language, but the proposal was rejected by nearly three-quarters of the voters.

=== Malaysia ===
The official language of Malaysia is the Malay (Bahasa Melayu), also known as Bahasa Malaysia or just Bahasa for short. Bahasa Melayu is being protected under Article 152 of the Constitution of Malaysia.

=== Netherlands ===
Dutch is the official language of the Netherlands (a constituent country within the Kingdom of the Netherlands). In the province of Friesland, Frisian is the official second language. While Dutch is therefore the official language of the Caribbean Netherlands (the islands Bonaire, Saba and Sint Eustatius), it is not any of the three islands' main spoken language: Papiamento is the most often spoken language on Bonaire, while English is on both Saba and Sint Eustatius. These languages can be used in official documents (but do not have the same status as Frisian). Low Saxon and Limburgish, languages acknowledged by the European Charter, are spoken in specific regions of the Netherlands.

=== New Zealand ===
New Zealand has three official languages. English is the de facto official language, accepted as such in all situations. The Māori language and New Zealand Sign Language both have restricted de jure official status under the Māori Language Act 2016 and New Zealand Sign Language Act 2006.

In 2018, New Zealand First MP Clayton Mitchell introduced a bill to parliament to statutorily recognise English as an official language. As of May 2020, the bill had not progressed. During the 2023 New Zealand general election, New Zealand First leader Winston Peters campaigned to make English an official language, and in 2026 a relevant bill received its first reading. This bill became law on 30 July 2026.

=== Nigeria ===
The official language of Nigeria is English, which was chosen to facilitate the cultural and linguistic unity of the country. British colonial rule ended in 1960.

=== Pakistan ===
Urdu and English both are official languages in Pakistan. Pakistan has more than 60 other languages. Among these, Sindhi exists as an official language in the province of Sindh.

=== Philippines ===
Filipino and English both are official languages of the Philippines.

=== Poland ===
Polish is the official language of Poland.

=== Russia ===
Russian is the official language of the Russian Federation and in all federal subjects, however many minority languages have official status in the areas where they are indigenous. One type of federal subject in Russia, republics, are allowed to adopt additional official languages alongside Russian in their constitutions. Republics are often based around particular native ethnic groups and are often areas where ethnic Russians and native Russian-language speakers are a minority.

=== South Africa ===
South Africa has twelve official languages that are mostly indigenous. Due to limited funding, however, the government rarely produces documents in most languages. Accusations of mismanagement and corruption have been leveled against the Pan South African Language Board, established to promote multilingualism, develop the 11 official languages, and protect language rights in the country. In practice, government is conducted in English.

=== Switzerland ===
The four national languages of Switzerland are German, French, Italian and Romansh. At the federal level German, French and Italian are official languages, the official languages of individual cantons depend on the languages spoken in them.

=== Taiwan ===
Mandarin is the most common language used in government. After World War II the mainland Chinese-run government made Mandarin the official language, and it was used in the schools and government. Under the Development of National Languages Act, political participation can be conducted in any national language, which is defined as a "natural language used by an original people group of Taiwan", which also includes Formosan languages, the Taiwanese variety of Hokkien and Hakka. According to Taiwan's Legislative Yuan, amendments were made to the Hakka Basic Act to make Hakka an official language of Taiwan.

=== Timor-Leste ===
According to the constitution of Timor-Leste, Tetum and Portuguese are the official languages of the country, and every official document must be published in both languages; Indonesian and English hold "working language" status in the country.

=== Ukraine ===
The official language of Ukraine is Ukrainian.

=== United Kingdom ===
The de facto official language of the United Kingdom is English. In Wales, the Welsh language, spoken by approximately 20% of the population, has de jure official status, alongside English. as of November 30, 2025 Gaelic and Scots have become official languages of Scotland alongside the earlier declared official language of English.

=== United States ===
Map of US official language status by state before 2016. Blue: English as the official language; light-blue: English as a co-official language; gray: no official language specified.

English is the predominant language of the United States. While the U.S. has no de jure official language as no legislation has been passed to recognize English as the nation's official language, Executive Order 14224 of 2025 declares English official. Most states have passed legislation to designate English as their official language; 32 of the 50 U.S. states and all five inhabited U.S. territories have designated English as one, or the only, official language, while courts have found that residents in the 50 states do not have a right to government services in their preferred language. Public debate in the last few decades has focused on whether Spanish should be recognized by the government, or whether all business should be done in English.

California allows people to take their driving test in the following 32 languages: Amharic, Arabic, Armenian, Chinese, Croatian, English, French, German, Greek, Hebrew, Hindi, Hmong, Hungarian, Indonesian, Italian, Japanese, Khmer, Korean, Laotian, Persian, Polish, Portuguese, Punjabi, Romanian, Russian, Samoan, Spanish, Tagalog/Filipino, Thai, Tongan, Turkish, and Vietnamese.

New York state provides voter-registration forms in the following five languages: Bengali, Chinese, English, Korean and Spanish. The same languages are also on ballot papers in certain parts of the state (namely, New York City).

Opponents of an official English language policy in the United States argue that it would hamper "the government's ability to reach out, communicate, and warn people in the event of a natural or man-made disaster such as a hurricane, pandemic, or...another terrorist attack". Professor of politics Alan Patten argues that disengagement (officially ignoring the issue) works well in religious issues but that it is not possible with language issues because it must offer public services in some language.

=== Yugoslavia ===
Sometimes an official language definition can be motivated more by national identity than by linguistic concerns. Prior to the breakup in early 1990s, although SFR Yugoslavia had no official language on the federal level, its six constituent republics including two autonomous provinces accounted for four official languages—Serbo-Croatian, Slovene, Macedonian and Albanian. Serbo-Croatian served as the lingua franca for mutual understanding and was also the language of the military, as official in four republics and taught as a second language in the other two.

When Croatia declared independence in 1991, it defined its official language as Croatian, while the confederate union of Serbia and Montenegro likewise defined its official language as Serbian in 1992. Bosnia and Herzegovina defined three official languages: Bosnian, Croatian, and Serbian. From the linguistic point of view, the different names refer to national varieties of the same language, which is known under the appellation of Serbo-Croatian. The language used in Montenegro became standardized as the Montenegrin language upon Montenegro's declaration of independence from Serbia and Montenegro in 2006.

=== Zimbabwe ===
Since the adoption of the 2013 Constitution, Zimbabwe has 16 official languages, namely

- Chewa
- Chibarwe
- English
- Kalanga
- Koisan
- Nambya
- Ndau
- Ndebele
- Shangani
- Shona
- sign language
- Sotho
- Tonga
- Tswana
- Venda
- Xhosa

== See also ==
- Language policy
- List of official languages by country and territory
- List of official languages of international organizations
- Medium of instruction
- Minority language
- National language
- Official script
- Regional language
- Working language
