= Lingua franca =

Concept in linguistics

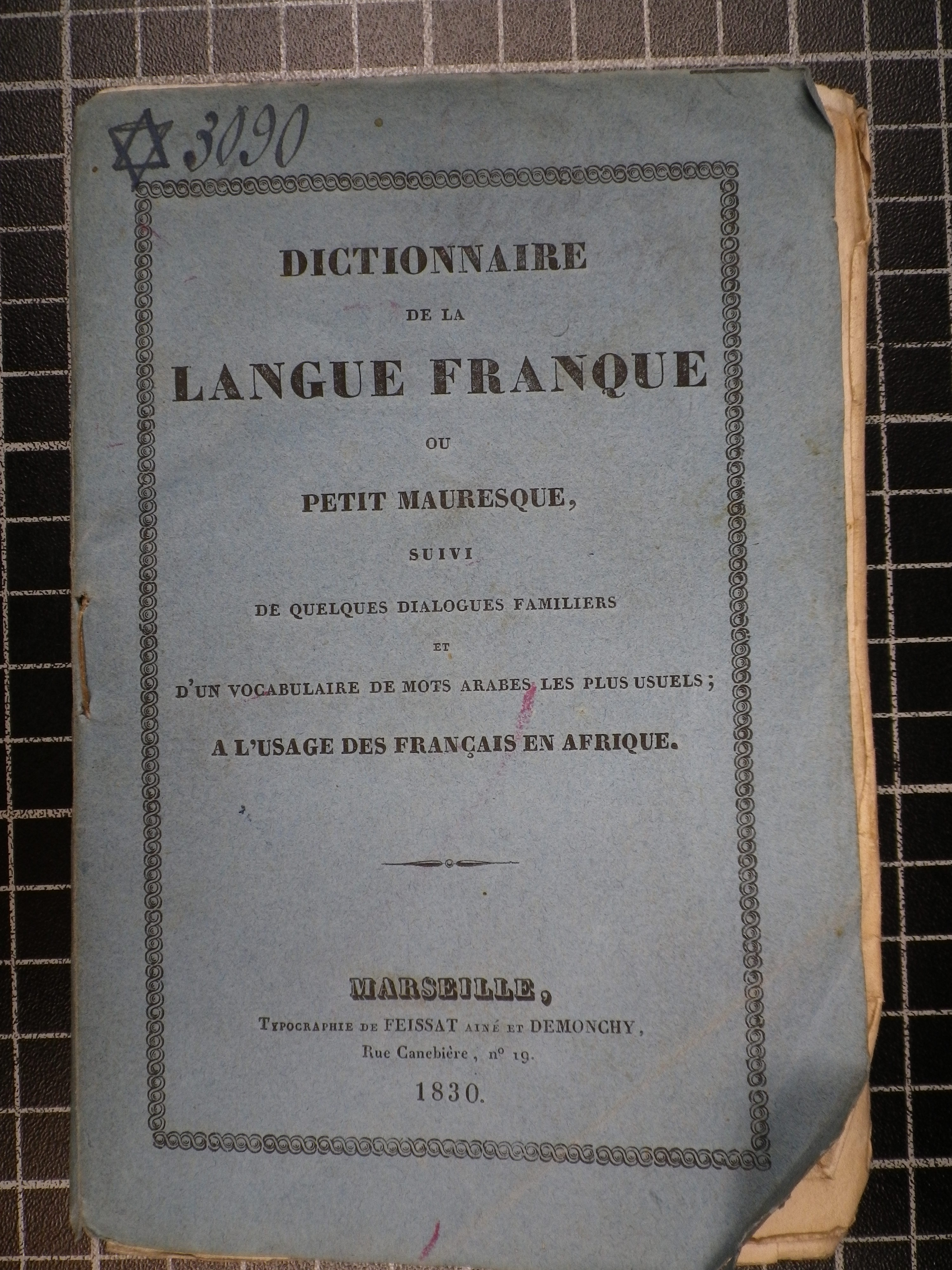
French dictionary printed in 1830 detailing the Mediterranean Lingua Franca

A lingua franca (/ˌlɪŋɡwə ˈfræŋkə/; lit. 'Frankish tongue or language'), also known as a bridge language, common language, trade language, auxiliary language, link language, or language of wider communication (LWC), is a language systematically used to make communication possible between groups of people who do not share a native language or dialect, particularly when it is a third language that is distinct from both of the speakers' native languages.

Lingua francas have developed around the world throughout human history, sometimes for commercial reasons (so-called "trade languages" facilitated trade), but also for cultural, religious, diplomatic and administrative convenience, and as a means of exchanging information between scientists and other scholars of different nationalities. The term is taken from the medieval Mediterranean Lingua Franca, a Romance-based pidgin language used especially by traders in the Mediterranean Basin from the 11th to the 19th centuries. A world language—a language spoken internationally and by many people—is a language that may function as a global lingua franca.

== Characteristics ==
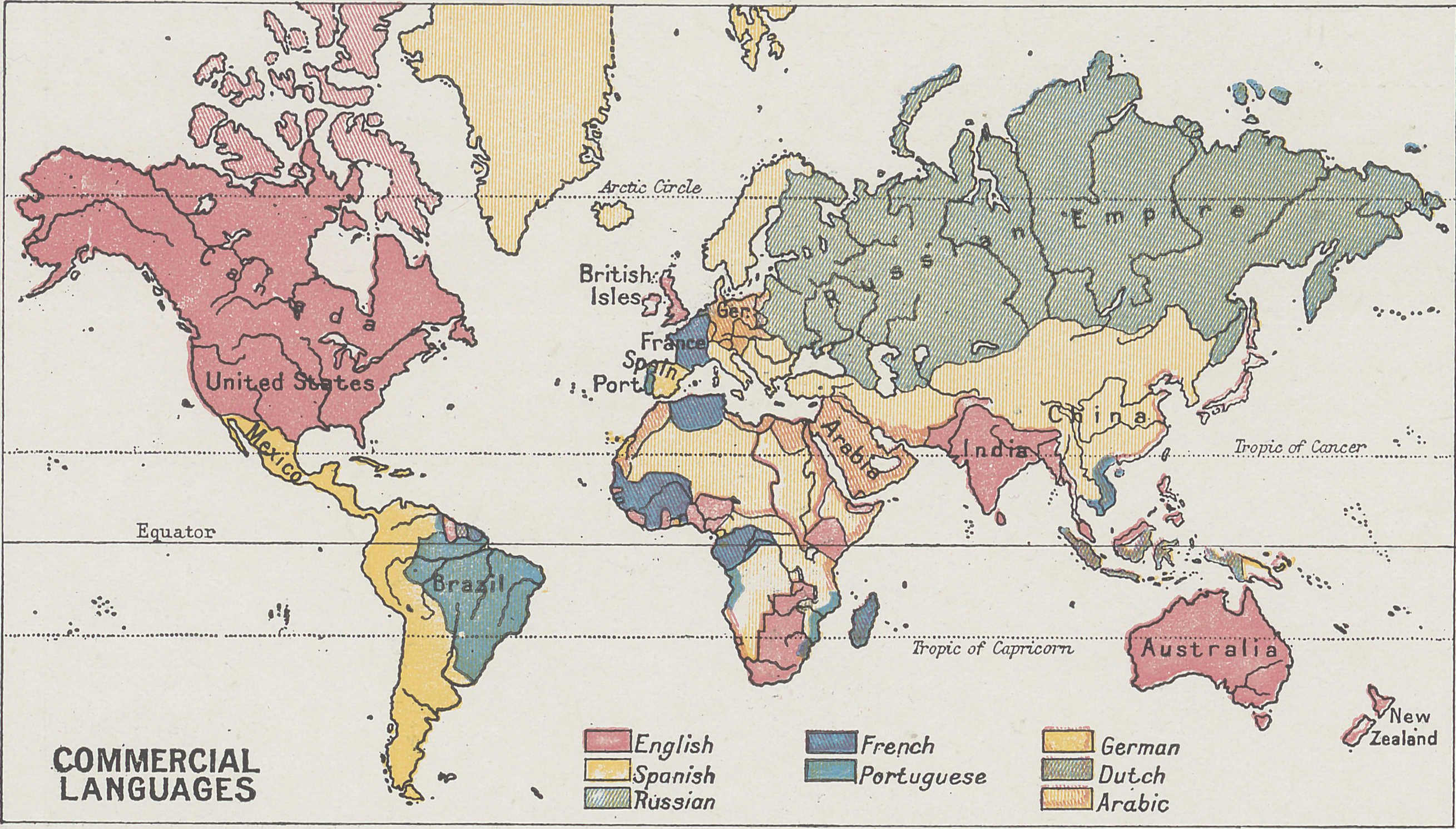
Trade languages of the world in 1908 from The Harmsworth Atlas and Gazetteer

Any language regularly used for communication between people who do not share a native language is a lingua franca. Lingua franca is a functional term, independent of any linguistic history or language structure.

Pidgins are therefore lingua francas; creoles and arguably mixed languages may similarly be used for communication between language groups. However, the term lingua franca is equally applicable to a non-creole language native to one nation, often a colonial power, learned as a second language and used for communication between diverse language communities in a colony or former colony.

Lingua francas are often pre-existing languages with native speakers, but they can also be pidgins or creoles developed for that specific region or context. Pidgins are rapidly developed and simplified combinations of two or more established languages, while creoles are generally viewed as pidgins that have evolved into fully complex languages in the course of adaptation by subsequent generations. Often, pre-existing lingua francas such as French are used to facilitate intercommunication in large-scale trade or political matters, while pidgins and creoles often arise out of colonial situations and a specific need for communication between colonists and indigenous peoples. Pre-existing lingua francas are generally widespread, highly developed languages with many native speakers. Conversely, pidgins are very simplified means of communication, containing loose structuring, few grammatical rules, and possessing few or no native speakers. Creole languages are more developed than their ancestral pidgins, utilizing more complex structure, grammar, and vocabulary, as well as having substantial communities of native speakers.

Whereas a vernacular language is the native language of a specific geographical community, a lingua franca is used beyond the boundaries of its original community, for trade, religious, political, or academic reasons. For example, English is a vernacular in the United Kingdom but it is used as a lingua franca in the Philippines, alongside Filipino. Likewise, Arabic, French, Standard Chinese, Russian and Spanish serve similar purposes as industrial and educational lingua francas across regional and national boundaries.

Even though they are used as bridge languages, international auxiliary languages such as Esperanto have not had a great degree of adoption, so they are not described as lingua francas.

== Etymology ==
The term lingua franca derives from Mediterranean Lingua Franca (also known as Sabir), the pidgin language that people around the Levant and the eastern Mediterranean Sea used as the main language of commerce and diplomacy from the late Middle Ages to the 18th century, most notably during the Renaissance era. During that period, a simplified version of mainly Italian in the eastern Mediterranean and Spanish in the western Mediterranean that incorporated many loanwords from Greek, Slavic languages, Arabic, and Turkish came to be widely used as the "lingua franca" of the region, although some scholars claim that the Mediterranean Lingua Franca was just poorly used Italian.

In Lingua Franca (the specific language), lingua is from the Italian for 'a language'. Franca is related to Greek Φρᾰ́γκοι (Phránkoi) and Arabic إِفْرَنْجِي (ʾifranjiyy) as well as the equivalent Italian—in all three cases, the literal sense is 'Frankish', leading to the direct translation: 'language of the Franks'. During the late Byzantine Empire, Franks was a term that applied to all Western Europeans.

Through changes of the term in literature, lingua franca has come to be interpreted as a general term for pidgins, creoles, and some or all forms of vehicular languages. This transition in meaning has been attributed to the idea that pidgin languages only became widely known from the 16th century on due to European colonization of continents such as The Americas, Africa, and Asia. During this time, the need for a term to address these pidgin languages arose, hence the shift in the meaning of Lingua Franca from a single proper noun to a common noun encompassing a large class of pidgin languages.

As recently as the late 20th century, some restricted the use of the generic term to mean only mixed languages that are used as vehicular languages, its original meaning.

Douglas Harper's Online Etymology Dictionary states that the term Lingua Franca (as the name of the particular language) was first recorded in English during the 1670s, although an even earlier example of the use of it in English is attested from 1632, where it is also referred to as "Bastard Spanish".

== Examples ==
=== Historical lingua francas ===
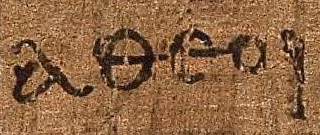
Koine Greek

The use of lingua francas has existed since antiquity.

Akkadian remained the common language of a large part of Western Asia from several earlier empires, until it was supplanted in this role by Aramaic.

Sanskrit historically served as a lingua franca throughout the majority of South Asia. The Sanskrit language's historic presence is attested across a wide geography beyond South Asia. Inscriptions and literary evidence suggest that Sanskrit was already being adopted in Southeast Asia and Central Asia in the 1st millennium CE, through monks, religious pilgrims and merchants.

Until the early 20th century, Literary Chinese served as both the written lingua franca and the diplomatic language in East Asia, including China, Korea, Japan, Ryūkyū, Vietnam and Taiwan. In the early 20th century, vernacular written Chinese replaced Classical Chinese within China as both the written and spoken lingua franca for speakers of different Chinese dialects, and because of the declining power and cultural influence of China in East Asia, English has since replaced Classical Chinese as the lingua franca in East Asia.

Koine Greek was the lingua franca of the Hellenistic culture. Koine Greek (Modern Greek: Ελληνιστική Κοινή, romanized: Ellinistikí Kiní, lit. 'Common Greek'; Greek: [elinistiˈci ciˈni]), also known as Hellenistic Greek or Biblical Greek, was the common supra-regional form of Greek spoken and written during the Hellenistic period, the Roman Empire and the early Byzantine Empire. It evolved from the spread of Greek following the conquests of Alexander the Great in the fourth century BC, and served as the lingua franca of much of the Mediterranean region and the Middle East during the following centuries.

Latin, through the power of the Roman Republic, became the dominant language in Italy and subsequently throughout the realms of the Roman Empire. Even after the Fall of the Western Roman Empire, Latin was the common language of communication, science, and academia in Europe until well into the 18th century, when other regional vernaculars (including its own descendants, the Romance languages) supplanted it in common academic and political usage, and it eventually became a dead language in the modern linguistic definition.

Old Tamil was once the lingua franca for most of ancient Tamilakam and Sri Lanka. John Guy states that Tamil was also the lingua franca for early maritime traders from India. The language and its dialects were used widely in the state of Kerala as the major language of administration, literature and common usage until the 12th century CE.

Classical Māori is the retrospective name for the language (formed out of many dialects, albeit all mutually intelligible) of both the North Island and the South Island for the 800 years before the European settlement of New Zealand. Māori shared a common language that was used for trade, inter-iwi dialogue on marae, and education through wānanga. After the signing of the Treaty of Waitangi, Māori language was the lingua franca of the Colony of New Zealand until English superseded it in the 1870s. The description of Māori language as New Zealand's 19th-century lingua franca has been widely accepted. The language was initially vital for all European and Chinese migrants in New Zealand to learn, as Māori formed a majority of the population, owned nearly all the country's land and dominated the economy until the 1860s. Discriminatory laws such as the Native Schools Act 1867 contributed to the demise of Māori language as a lingua franca. In earlier contact eras, Māori was also among the bases for Maritime Polynesian Pidgin for use between European voyagers and trading Polynesians as a whole.

Sogdian was used to facilitate trade between those who spoke different languages along the Silk Road, which is why native speakers of Sogdian were employed as translators in Tang China. The Sogdians also ended up circulating spiritual beliefs and texts, including those of Buddhism and Christianity, thanks to their ability to communicate to many people in the region through their native language.

Old Church Slavonic, an Eastern South Slavic language, is the first Slavic literary language. Between 9th and 11th century, it was the lingua franca of a great part of the predominantly Slavic states and populations in Southeast and Eastern Europe, in liturgy and church organization, culture, literature, education and diplomacy, as an Official language and National language in the case of Bulgaria. It was the first national and also international Slavic literary language (autonym словѣ́ньскъ ѩꙁꙑ́къ, slověnĭskŭ językŭ). The Glagolitic alphabet was originally used at both schools, though the Cyrillic script was developed early on at the Preslav Literary School, where it superseded Glagolitic as the official script in Bulgaria in 893. Old Church Slavonic spread to other South-Eastern, Central, and Eastern European Slavic territories, most notably Croatia, Serbia, Bohemia, Lesser Poland, and principalities of the Kievan Rus' while retaining characteristically South Slavic linguistic features. It spread also to not completely Slavic territories between the Carpathian Mountains, the Danube and the Black Sea, corresponding to Wallachia and Moldavia. Nowadays, the Cyrillic writing system is used for various languages across Eurasia, and as the national script in various Slavic, Turkic, Mongolic, Uralic, Caucasian and Iranic-speaking countries in Southeast Europe, Eastern Europe, the Caucasus, Central, North, and East Asia.

The Polish language was a lingua franca, important both diplomatically and academically in Central and Eastern Europe. Tomasz Kamusella notes that "Polish is the oldest, non-ecclesiastical, written Slavic language with a continuous tradition of literacy and official use, which has lasted unbroken from the 16th century to this day." Polish evolved into the main sociolect of the nobles in Poland–Lithuania in the 15th century. The history of Polish as a language of state governance begins in the 16th century in the Kingdom of Poland. Over the later centuries, Polish served as the official language in the Grand Duchy of Lithuania, Congress Poland, the Kingdom of Galicia and Lodomeria, and as the administrative language in the Russian Empire's Western Krai. The growth of the Polish–Lithuanian Commonwealth's influence gave Polish the status of lingua franca in Central and Eastern Europe.

The Mediterranean Lingua Franca was largely based on Northern Italy's languages and secondarily on Occitano-Romance languages. This language was spoken from the 11th to 19th centuries around the Mediterranean basin, particularly in the European commercial empires of Italian cities (Genoa, Venice, Florence, Milan, Pisa, Siena) and in trading ports located throughout the eastern Mediterranean rim.

During the Renaissance, standard Italian was spoken as a language of culture in the main royal courts of Europe, and among intellectuals. Italian musical terms, in particular dynamic and tempo notations, have continued in use to the present day.

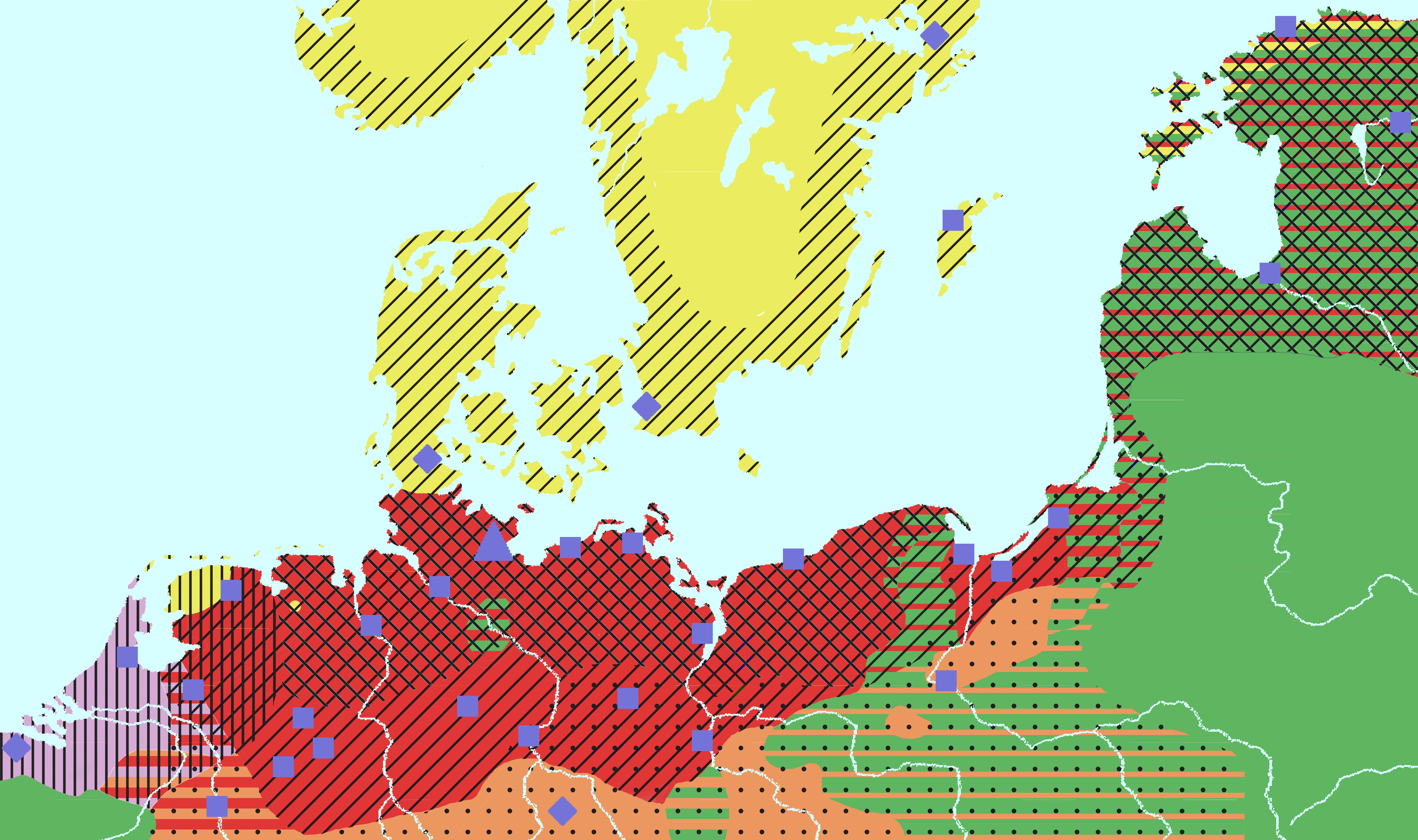
Extent of Middle Low German in red with its use as a literary language black lines tilted right

Low German, also known as Low Saxon, used to be the Lingua franca during the late Hohenstaufen till the mid-15th century periods (Middle Low German), in the North Sea and the Baltic Sea when extensive trading was done by the Hanseatic League along the Baltic and North Seas.

Classical Quechua is either of two historical forms of Quechua, the exact relationship and degree of closeness between which is controversial, and which have sometimes been identified with each other. These are:

1. the variety of Quechua that was used as a lingua franca and administrative language in the Inca Empire (1438–1533) (or Inca lingua franca). Since the Incas did not have writing, the evidence about the characteristics of this variety is scant and they have been a subject of significant disagreements.
2. the variety of Quechua that was used in writing for religious and administrative purposes in the Andean territories of the Spanish Empire, mostly in the late 16th century and the first half of the 17th century and has sometimes been referred to, both historically and in academia, as lengua general ('common language') (or Standard Colonial Quechua).

Ajem-Turkic functioned as lingua franca in the Caucasus region and in southeastern Dagestan, and was widely spoken at the court and in the army of Safavid Iran.

=== Modern ===
==== English ====
English language distribution Majority language Official or administrative language, but not majority language

English is sometimes described as the foremost global lingua franca, being used as a working language by individuals of diverse linguistic and cultural backgrounds in a variety of fields and international organizations to communicate with one another. English is the most spoken language in the world, primarily due to the historical global influence of the British Empire and the United States. It is a co-official language of the United Nations and many other international and regional organizations and has also become the de facto language of diplomacy, science, international trade, tourism, aviation, entertainment and the Internet.

When the United Kingdom became a colonial power, English served as the lingua franca of the colonies of the British Empire. In the post-colonial period, most of the newly independent nations which had many indigenous languages opted to continue using English as one of their official languages such as Ghana and South Africa. In other former colonies with several official languages such as Singapore and Fiji, English is the primary medium of education and serves as the lingua franca among citizens.

Even in countries not associated with the English-speaking world, English has emerged as a lingua franca in certain situations where its use is perceived to be more efficient to communicate, especially among groups consisting of native speakers of many languages. In Qatar, the medical community is primarily made up of workers from countries without English as a native language. In medical practices and hospitals, nurses typically communicate with other professionals in English as a lingua franca. This occurrence has led to interest in researching the consequences of the medical community communicating in a lingua franca. English is also sometimes used in Switzerland between people who do not share one of Switzerland's four official languages, or with foreigners who are not fluent in the local language. In the European Union, the use of English as a lingua franca has led researchers to investigate whether a Euro English dialect has emerged. In the fields of technology and science, English emerged as a lingua franca in the 20th century. English has also significantly influenced many other languages.

==== Spanish ====
Spanish language distribution Official language Co-official language Culturally important or secondary language (> 20% of the population)

The Spanish language spread mainly throughout the New World, becoming a lingua franca in the territories and colonies of the Spanish Empire, which also included parts of Africa, Asia, and Oceania. After the breakup of much of the empire in the Americas, its function as a lingua franca was solidified by the governments of the newly independent nations of what is now Hispanic America. While its usage in Spain's Asia-Pacific colonies has largely died out, Spanish became the lingua franca of what is now Equatorial Guinea, being the main language of government and education and is spoken by the vast majority of the population.

Due to large numbers of immigrants from Latin America in the second half of the 20th century and resulting influence, Spanish has also emerged somewhat as a lingua franca in parts of the Southwestern United States and southern Florida, especially in communities where native Spanish speakers form the majority of the population.

At present it is the second most used language in international trade, and the third most used in politics, diplomacy and culture after English and French.

It is also one of the most taught foreign languages throughout the world and is also one of the six official languages of the United Nations.

==== French ====
French language distribution Majority native language Official language, but not a majority native language Administrative or cultural language

French is sometimes regarded as the first global lingua franca, having supplanted Latin as the prestige language of politics, trade, education, diplomacy, and military in early modern Europe and later spreading around the world with the establishment of the French colonial empire. With France emerging as the leading political, economic, and cultural power of Europe in the mid-17th century, the language was adopted by royal courts throughout the continent, including the United Kingdom, Sweden, and Russia, and as the language of communication between European academics, merchants, and diplomats. With the expansion of Western colonial empires, French became the main language of diplomacy and international relations up until World War II when it was replaced by English due to the rise of the United States as the leading superpower. Stanley Meisler of the Los Angeles Times said that the fact that the Treaty of Versailles was written in English as well as French was the "first diplomatic blow" against the language. Nevertheless, it remains the second most used language in international affairs and is one of the six official languages of the United Nations.

As a legacy of French and Belgian colonial rule, most former colonies of these countries maintain French as an official language or lingua franca due to the many indigenous languages spoken in their territory. Notably, in most Francophone West and Central African countries, French has transitioned from being only a lingua franca to the native language among some communities, mostly in urban areas or among the elite class. In other regions such as the French-speaking countries of the Maghreb (Algeria, Tunisia, Morocco, and Mauritania) and parts of the French Caribbean, French is the lingua franca in professional sectors and education, even though it is not the native language of the majority.

French continues to be used as a lingua franca in certain cultural fields such as cuisine, fashion, and sport.

==== German ====
Legal statuses of German in Europe: (co-)official language and first language of the majority co-official, but not the first language of the majority legally recognized minority language sizable minority, without legal recognition

German is used as a lingua franca in Central Europe and historically in Eastern and Northern Europe, and continues to be one to some extent. As German speakers became established in these regions in Early modern Europe, Low German and later the modern standardized form of High German became the prestigious language of the urban centers, eventually becoming the common language of the Hanseatic League and later, lands ruled under the Holy Roman Empire and Habsburg monarchy. Its prominence outside of Europe grew in the 19th century, becoming a common language in science and other academic fields such as psychology, and despite the rise of English, continues to serve as an important lingua franca.

Outside of the German-speaking countries of Central Europe (Germany, Switzerland, Austria, Liechtenstein), German remains a key second language in the region and the Balkans, especially in former Yugoslavia. It is also a national language in the former German colony of Namibia, where it is especially used in commerce and taught as a second language. German is also one of the working languages of the EU along with English and French, but it is used less in that role than the other two.

==== Chinese ====
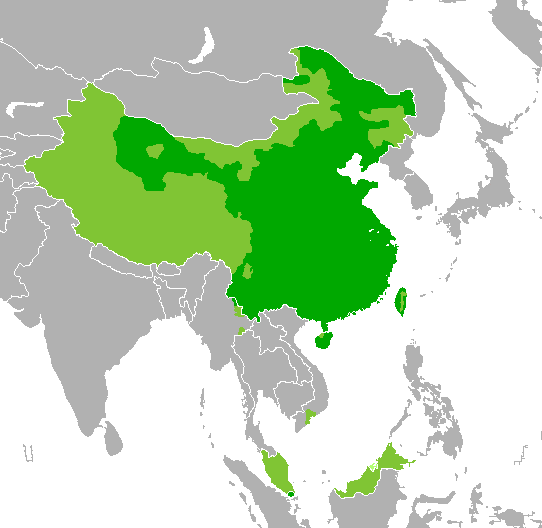
Map of the Chinese-speaking world. native majority official or educational significant minorities

Today, Standard Mandarin Chinese is the lingua franca of China and Taiwan, which are home to many mutually unintelligible varieties of Chinese and, in the case of Taiwan, indigenous Formosan languages. Among many Chinese diaspora communities, Cantonese is often used as the lingua franca instead, particularly in Southeast Asia, due to a longer history of immigration and trade networks with southern China, although Mandarin has also been adopted in some circles since the 2000s.

==== Arabic ====
Arabic language map Dark green: majority; light green: significant minority

Arabic was used as a lingua franca across the Islamic empires, whose sizes necessitated a common language, and spread across the Arab and Muslim worlds. In Djibouti and parts of Eritrea, both of which are countries where multiple official languages are spoken, Arabic has emerged as a lingua franca in part thanks to the population of the region being predominantly Muslim and Arabic playing a crucial role in Islam. In addition, after having fled from Eritrea due to ongoing warfare and gone to some of the nearby Arab countries, Eritrean emigrants are contributing to Arabic becoming a lingua franca in the region by coming back to their homelands having picked up the Arabic language.

==== Russian ====
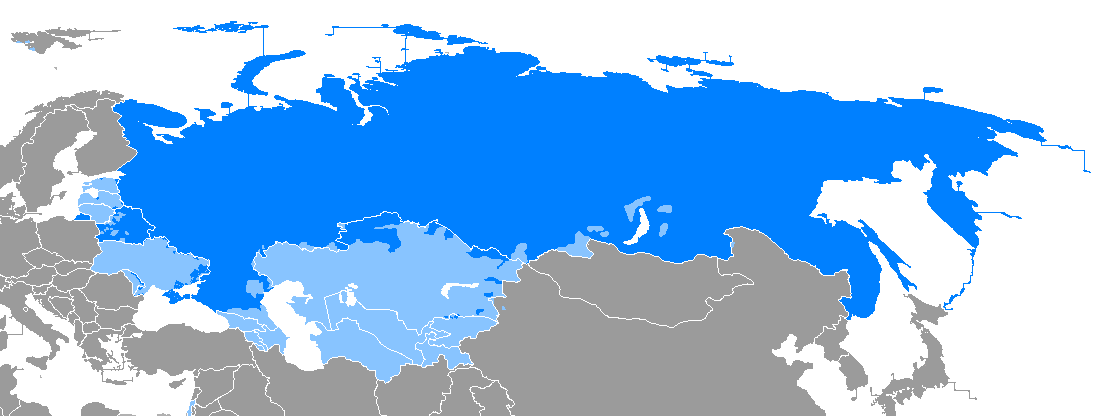
Areas where Russian is the majority language (dark blue) or a minority language (light blue)

In addition to being the largest native language in Europe, Russian is widely spoken and understood in Central Asia and the Caucasus, areas formerly part of the Russian Empire and the Soviet Union. Its use still predominates in many post-Soviet states. Russian is present as a minority language in the Baltic states, Moldova, and Ukraine. In Belarus, Russian is the second official language and is used much more widely than Belarusian. It remains the official language of the Commonwealth of Independent States. Russian is also one of the six official languages of the United Nations. Since the collapse of the Soviet Union, its use has declined in post-Soviet states. Some members of Russian-speaking minorities outside Russia have either emigrated to Russia or become more integrated into their countries of residence, often learning the local language and, in some cases, using it more frequently in daily communication.

Unlike the former Soviet republics, in the Central European countries that fell under Soviet occupation and influence after World War II, Russian was taught in schools as a compulsory foreign language, and its practical use was limited to international communication within the Eastern Bloc. Russian-speaking minorities in these countries were very small or nonexistent, so after the collapse of the Eastern Bloc, English completely replaced Russian as the international language.

==== Italian ====
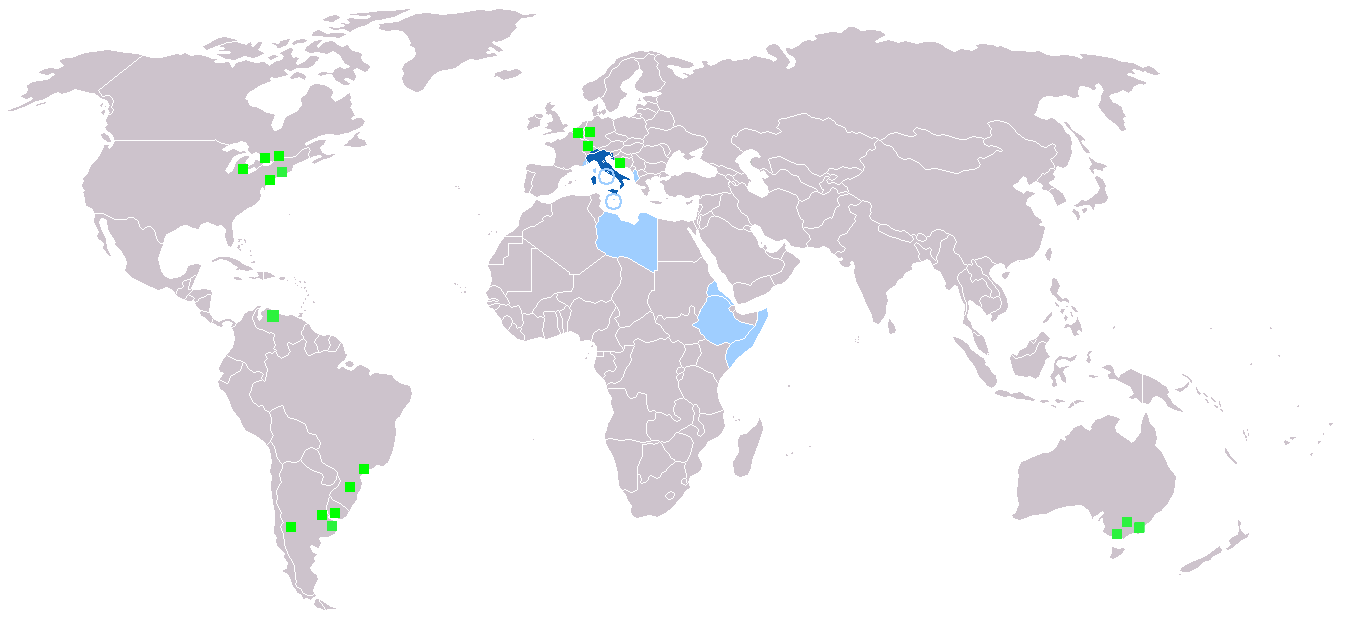
Italian language distribution Areas where it is the majority language Areas where it is a minority language or where it was a former colonial language Areas where notable Italian-speaking communities are present

During the Renaissance, Italian, particularly the Tuscan variety that became the basis of standard Italian, was considered the lingua franca among the European elite and royal courts, especially in cultural and intellectual circles. The literary authority of figures such as Dante Alighieri, Petrarch and Giovanni Boccaccio established Italian as a major language of humanist scholarship and literature. Moreover, the political and economic influence of Italian city-states like the Republic of Florence and the Republic of Venice attracted diplomats, merchants, artists, and scholars from across Europe, many of whom engaged with Italian as a language of culture, commerce, and artistic exchange. While Latin remained the primary language of formal scholarship and diplomacy, Italian functioned as an important vernacular medium within elite artistic, literary, and courtly environments during that period.

From the 17th century onward, Italian became the principal lingua franca of European music, particularly in opera and classical composition. Because Italy was the birthplace of opera and a leading center of musical innovation, its terminology was adopted internationally. Composers such as Claudio Monteverdi and later Antonio Vivaldi helped solidify Italian’s prestige, and musical terms became standard across Europe.

Today, Italian is the main working language of the Holy See, serving as the lingua franca in the Roman Catholic hierarchy and the official language of the Sovereign Military Order of Malta. Italian influence led to the development of derivated languages and dialects worldwide. It is also widespread in various sectors and markets, with its loanwords used in arts, luxury goods, fashion, sports and cuisine; it has a significant use in musical terminology and opera, with numerous Italian words referring to music that have become international terms taken into various languages worldwide, including in English.

Italian is an official language in Italy, San Marino, Switzerland (Ticino and part of the Grisons), and Vatican City, and it has official minority status in Croatia, Slovenia (Istria), Romania, Bosnia and Herzegovina, and in 6 municipalities of Brazil. It is also spoken in Malta (by 66% of the population), Albania (upwards of 70%), and Monaco.

==== Polish ====
Historically, Polish language was the lingua franca of the multilingual Polish–Lithuanian Commonwealth, important both diplomatically and academically in Central and Eastern Europe. It is currently an official language in Poland and the European Union and a recognised minority language in Bosnia and Herzegovina, Brazil, Czech Republic, Hungary, Lithuania, Romania, Slovakia, Ukraine. In the United States, Polish Americans number more than 11 million.

==== Portuguese ====
The Lusophone world Native language Official and administrative language Cultural or secondary language

Portuguese served as lingua franca in the Portuguese Empire, Africa, South America and Asia in the 15th and 16th centuries. When the Portuguese started exploring the seas of Africa, America, Asia and Oceania, they tried to communicate with the natives by mixing a Portuguese-influenced version of lingua franca with the local languages. When Dutch, English or French ships came to compete with the Portuguese, the crews tried to learn this "broken Portuguese". Through a process of change the lingua franca and Portuguese lexicon was replaced with the languages of the people in contact. Portuguese remains an important lingua franca in the Portuguese-speaking African countries, East Timor, and to a certain extent in Macau where it is recognized as an official language alongside Chinese though in practice not commonly spoken. Portuguese and Spanish have a certain degree of mutual intelligibility and mixed languages such as Portuñol are used to facilitate communication in areas like the border area between Brazil and Uruguay.

==== Hindustani ====
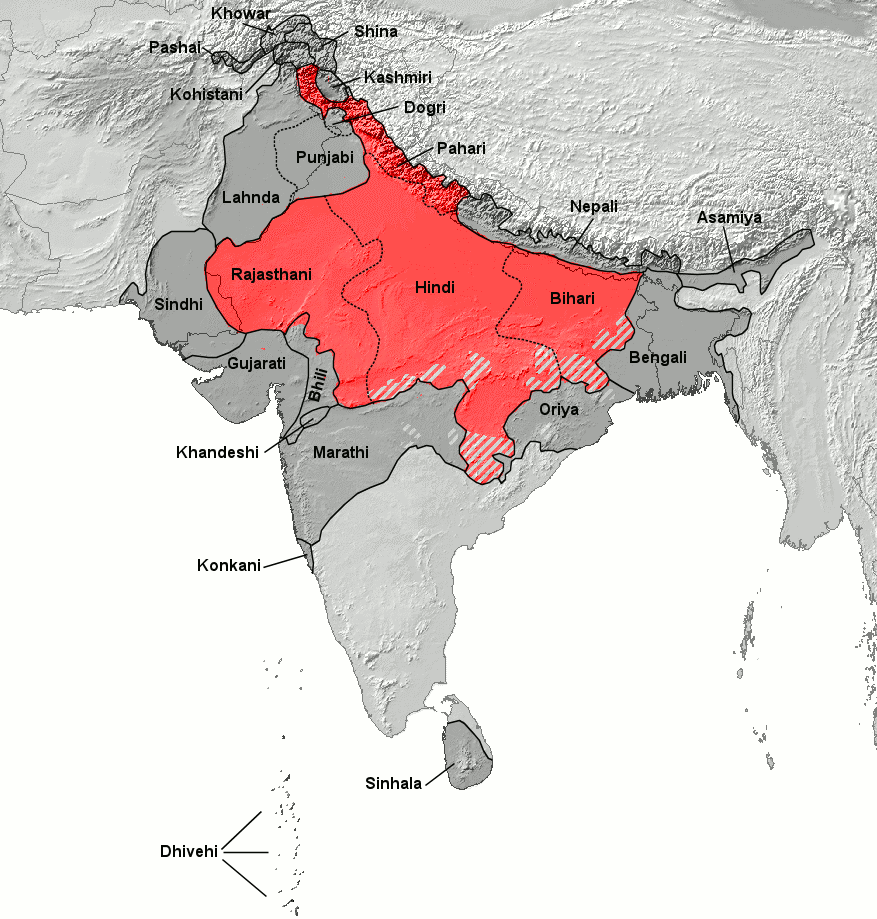
The Hindi Belt (red) is a linguistic region in India where Hindustani (based on Dehlavi) serves as the lingua franca.

The Hindustani language, with Hindi and Urdu as dual standard varieties, serves as the lingua franca of Northern India and Pakistan. Many Hindi-speaking North Indian states have adopted the three-language formula in which students are taught: "(a) Hindi (with Sanskrit as part of the composite course); (b) Any other modern Indian language including Urdu and (c) English or any other modern European language." The order in non-Hindi speaking states is: "(a) the major language of the state or region; (b) Hindi; (c) Any other modern Indian language including Urdu but excluding (a) and (b) above; and (d) English or any other modern European language." Hindi has also emerged as a lingua franca in Arunachal Pradesh, a linguistically diverse state in Northeast India. It is estimated that nine-tenths of the state's population knows Hindi.

Urdu is the lingua franca of Pakistan and had gained significant influence amongst its people, administration and education. While it shares official status with English, Urdu is the preferred and dominant language used for inter-communication between different ethnic groups of Pakistan.

==== Malay ====
Countries where pluricentric Malay is spoken, regardless of standard variety

Malay is understood across a cultural region in Southeast Asia called the "Malay world" including Brunei, Indonesia, Malaysia, Singapore, southern Thailand, and certain parts of the Philippines. It is pluricentric, with several nations codifying a local vernacular variety into several national literary standards: Although Javanese has more native speakers, Indonesia uses a standardized form of Riau Malay as the basis for the national language "Indonesian." Bahasa Indonesia is the sole official language even though it is the mother tongue of only 7% of Indonesians.

==== Swahili ====
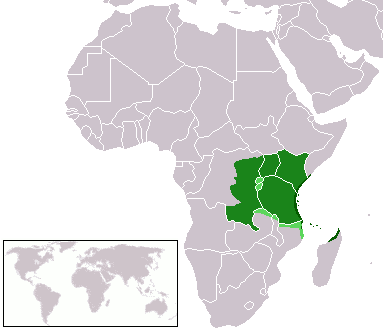
Geographic extent of Swahili. Dark green: native range. Medium green: official use. Light green: bilingual use but not official.

Swahili developed as a lingua franca between several Bantu-speaking tribal groups on the east coast of Africa with heavy influence from Arabic. The earliest examples of writing in Swahili are from 1711. In the early 19th century the use of Swahili as a lingua franca moved inland with the Arabic ivory and slave traders. It was eventually adopted by Europeans as well during periods of colonization in the area. German colonizers used it as the language of administration in German East Africa, later becoming Tanganyika, which influenced the choice to use it as a national language in what is now independent Tanzania. Swahili is currently one of the national languages and it is taught in schools and universities in several East African countries, thus prompting it to be regarded as a modern-day lingua franca by many people in the region. Several Pan-African writers and politicians have unsuccessfully called for Swahili to become the lingua franca of Africa as a means of unifying the African continent and overcoming the legacy of colonialism.

==== Persian ====
Areas with significant numbers of people whose first language is Persian (including dialects)

Persian, an Iranian language, is the official language of Iran, Afghanistan (Dari) and Tajikistan (Tajik). It acts as a lingua franca in both Iran and Afghanistan between the various ethnic groups in those countries. The Persian language in South Asia, before the British colonized the Indian subcontinent, was the region's lingua franca and a widely used official language in north India and Pakistan.

==== Hausa ====
Hausa is the language of communication between speakers of different languages in Northern Nigeria and other West African countries, including the northern region of Ghana.

==== Amharic ====
Amharic is the lingua franca and most widely spoken language in Ethiopia, and is known by most people who speak another Ethiopian language.

==== Creole languages ====
Creoles, such as Nigerian Pidgin in Nigeria, Haitian Creole, and Patois etc. are used as lingua francas across the world. This is especially true in Africa, the Caribbean, Melanesia, Southeast Asia and in parts of Australia by Indigenous Australians.

==== Sign languages ====
Map of the various sign languages of North America, excluding Francosign languages. Hand Talk was the predominant lingua franca prior to European settlement, able to be written down and signed alongside oral languages

The majority of pre-colonial North American nations communicated internationally using Hand Talk. Also called Prairie Sign Language, Plains Indian Sign Language, or First Nations Sign Language, this language functioned predominantly—and still continues to function—as a second language within most of the (now historical) countries of the Great Plains, from Newe Segobia in the West to Anishinaabewaki in the East, down into what are now the northern states of Mexico and up into Cree Country stopping before Denendeh. The relationship remains unknown between Hand Talk and other manual Indigenous languages like Keresan Sign Language and Plateau Sign Language, the latter of which is now extinct (though Ktunaxa Sign Language is still used). Although unrelated, perhaps Inuit Sign Language played and continues to play a similar role across Inuit Nunangat and the various Inuit dialects. The original Hand Talk is found across Indian Country in pockets, but it has also been employed to create new or revive old languages, such as with Oneida Sign Language.

International Sign, though a pidgin language, is present at most significant international gatherings, from which interpretations of national sign languages are given, such as in LSF, ASL, BSL, Libras, or Auslan. International Sign, or IS and formerly Gestuno, interpreters can be found at many European Union parliamentary or committee sittings, during certain United Nations affairs, conducting international sporting events like the Deaflympics, in all World Federation of the Deaf functions, and across similar settings. The language has few set internal grammatical rules, instead co-opting national vocabularies of the speaker and audience, and modifying the words to bridge linguistic gaps, with heavy use of gestures and classifiers.

== See also ==
- Creole language – Stable natural languages that have developed from a pidgin
- Global language system – Connections between language groups
- Interlinguistics – Subfield of linguistics
- Language contact – Interaction between different languages
- List of countries by number of languages
- List of languages by number of native speakers
- List of languages by total number of speakers
- Pidgin – Simplified language
- Rosetta Stone – Egyptian stele with three versions of a 196 BC decree
- Trading zones (metaphor) – Metaphor applied to collaborations in science
- Universal language – Hypothetical language
- Working language – Language given a unique legal status in a supranational society
