= Plains Indian Sign Language =

Endangered language of the Plains peoples

- Plains Sign Talk; Plains Sign Language; First Nation Sign Language
- Hand Talk
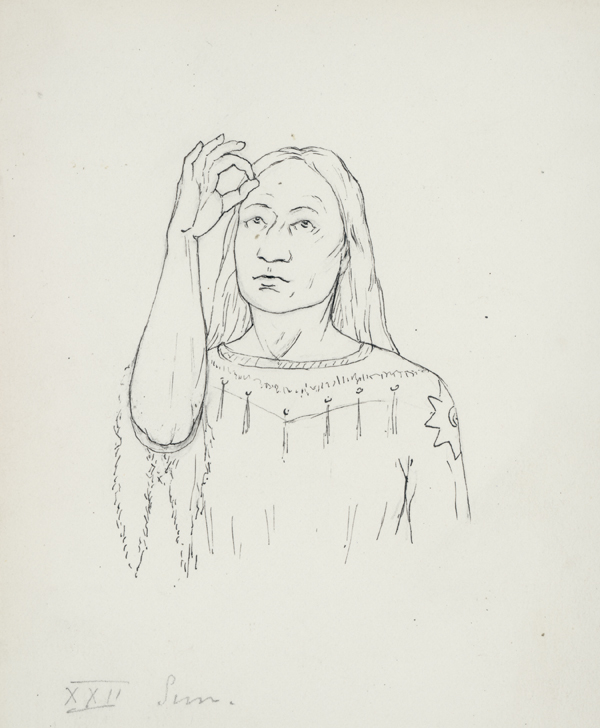
- Native to: Canada, Mexico, US
- Region: Central Turtle Island (North America)
- Ethnicity: Various Indigenous peoples of North America
- Language family: Hand Talk
- Dialects: Great Basin; Northeast (OSL); Plains; Southeast; Southwest; ? California Coast; ? Coast Salish; ? Plateau
- Writing system: Petroglyphs and pictographs

Official status
- Recognised minority language in: Recognised as official in courts, education and legislative assembly of Ontario.

Language codes
- ISO 639-3: psd
- Glottolog: plai1235
- ELP: Plains Indian Sign Language
- Map of the various sign languages spoken across North America, excluding Francosign languages. Plains Sign Language is labelled in red as Hand Talk

Extracts of the films taken during the 1930 Conference on PISL conservation, showing General Hugh L. Scott and signers from various tribes

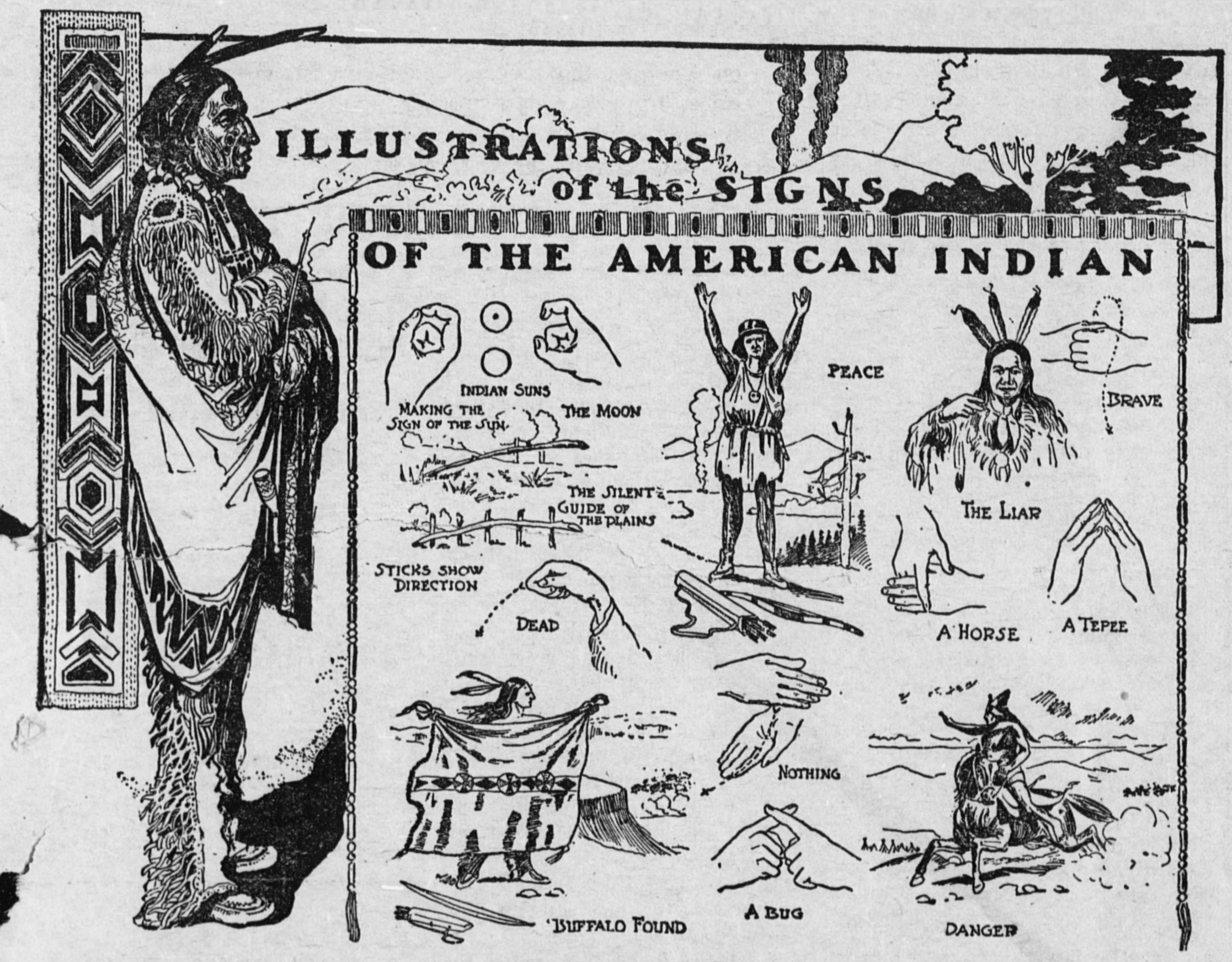
A 1900 newspaper illustration claiming to showcase several of the signs of Plains Indian Sign Language

Plains Indian Sign Language (PISL), also known as Hand Talk, Plains Sign Talk, Plains Sign Language, or First Nation Sign Language, is an endangered sign language common to the majority of Indigenous nations of North America, notably those of the Great Plains, Northeast Woodlands, and the Great Basin. It was, and continues to be, used across what is now central Canada, the Central United States, the Western United States and Northern Mexico. This language was used historically as a lingua franca, notably for international relations, trade, and diplomacy; it is still used for storytelling, oratory, various ceremonies, and by deaf people for ordinary daily use.

In 1885, it was estimated that there were over 110,000 "sign-talking Indians", including Blackfoot, Cheyenne, Sioux, Kiowa, and Arapaho. As a result of the European colonization of the Americas, most notably including American boarding and Canadian residential schools, the number of sign talkers has declined sharply. However, growing interest and preservation work on the language has increased its use and visibility in the 21st century. Historically, some have likened its more formal register, used by men, to Church Latin in function. It is primarily used today by Elders and Deaf citizens of Indigenous nations.

Some deaf Indigenous children attend schools for the deaf and learn American Sign Language (ASL) having already acquired Plains Sign Language. A group studied in 1998 were able to understand each other, though this was likely through the use of International Sign. Jeffrey E. Davis, a leading linguist in documentation efforts, hypothesizes that this contact, combined with potential contact with Martha's Vineyard Sign Language (another potential antecedent to ASL) may suggest that ASL descends in part from Plains Sign Language.

== Etymology ==
While there are many names for the language, Hand Talk is the preferred term in Indigenous communities. The term is a calque of the language's own name for itself. Other names for the language are used, like Plains Sign Talk and Plains Indian Sign Language (the latter favored exclusively in the United States), but these are erroneous as Hand Talk extends beyond the Great Plains into the Northeast Woodlands, the Great Basin, and beyond. Indeed, as McKay-Cody writes (2019), Hand Talk itself should be considered a family of closely related languages.

Whilst the name "Hand Talk" is a direct translation from the language itself, each nation has their own word or name for Hand Talk in their respective oral languages:

- Algonquian languages:
  - Arapaho: Bee3osohoot / Bee3sohoet
  - Blackfoot: A'psstówahsin
  - Cheyenne: Évȯhónestȯtse
  - Plains Cree: isiniskêstâkêwin (ᐃᓯᓂᐢᑫᐢᑖᑫᐃᐧᐣ)
- Caddoan languages:
  - Pawnee: Ikstaaruhuraawaahʾuʾ
- Iroquoian languages:
  - Seneca: Gayeöni:h
- Na-Dene languages:
  - Navajo: Yideez
- Siouan languages:
  - Crow: Baapáattuua
  - Dakota: Wikiyutapi
  - Ho-Chunk: Nąąp hoit'e
  - Lakota: Wíyutȟapi
  - Nakoda: Wíyutabi
  - Stoney: Wowîhâ Îabi
- Uto-Aztecan languages:
  - Comanche: Mootekwaʔpʉ̠ / Moʔotekwapʉ̠
  - Ute: Wanawmanik

== History ==
Hand Talk's history is intimately associated with both ancient and recent petroglyphs of the continent, however, little is known to academia about Plains Sign Talk's historical antecedents. The earliest records of contact between Europeans and Indigenous peoples of the Gulf Coast region in what is now Texas and northern Mexico note a fully-formed sign language already in use by the time of the Europeans' arrival there. These records include the accounts of Cabeza de Vaca in 1527 and Coronado in 1541.

Signing may have started in the southern parts of North America, perhaps in northern Mexico or Texas, and only spread into the Plains in recent times, though this suspicion may be an artifact of European observation. It is known that there is a complex of Maya sign languages called Meemul Chʼaabʼal or Meemul Tziij in the Kʼicheʼ language, but it is unknown to what extent Meemul Tziij has affected Hand Talk.

The Northwest is home to Plateau Sign Language, which is either a single language or a family of sign languages spoken by the local nations. It is also unknown how associated Plateau Sign Language is with Hand Talk, but it is probable that they are related. Although it is still spoken, especially by the Ktunaxa, the Plateau nations historically shifted to using Chinook Jargon instead.

In recent years, the Oneida Nation has taken steps to revive their sign language. Historically, the nations of the Northeast Woodlands, like the Haudenosaunee, spoke a variant of Hand Talk. The Oneida Sign Language Project officially began in 2016, and more signs are being added to this day.

== Geography ==
Sign language use has been documented across speakers of at least 37 oral languages in twelve families, spread across an area of over 2.6 million square kilometres (1 million square miles). In recent history, it was highly developed among the Crow, Cheyenne, Arapaho and Kiowa, among others, and remains strong among the Crow, Cheyenne and Arapaho.

The various nations with attested use, divided by language family, are:

- Algonquian: Anishinaabe, Arapaho, Blackfoot, Cheyenne, Cree, Gros Ventre
- Athabaskan: Apache (Mescalero, Lipan, Jicarilla, and Kiowa Apache), Beaver, Navajo, Tsúut'ínà
- Caddoan: Arikara, Pawnee, Wichita
- Coahuiltecan: Atakapa, Coahuilteco, Karankawa, Tonkawa
- Iroquoian: Haudenosaunee, Wendat
- Numic: Comanche, Paiute, Shoshone, Ute
- Plateau Penutian:
  - Sahaptian: Nez Perce, Palus, Sahaptin, Umatilla
- Piman: Akimel O'odham, Tohono O'odham, and continuing into northern Mexico
- Puebloan: Hopi, Keresan, Zuni
  - Tanoan: Kiowa, Taos
- Salishan: Coeur d'Alene, Flathead, Kalispel, Sanpoil, Spokane
- Siouan: Dakota, Crow, Hidatsa, Lakota, Mandan, Nakoda, Nakota, Omaha, Osage, Oto, Ponca
- Yuman: Maricopa
- Unclassified: Cayuse

Melanie R. McKay-Cody, a Cherokee Deaf woman and Hand Talk speaker/researcher, motions that "Plains" Sign Language is actually a family of inter-related languages extending beyond the Great Plains. She breaks down the regional languages as: Northeast Hand Talk (including Oneida Sign Language), Plains Sign Talk, Great Basin Sign Language (spoken, for example, by the Ute), and Southwest Hand Talk. She also notes a West Coast language spoken by the Chumash, and she advances the idea that Inuit Sign Language has some relation to this complex of manual North American Indigenous languages. Unmentioned is Coast Salish Sign Language. Within each of these languages, she explains that nations will themselves have specific dialects, such as the Blackfoot.

Southwest Hand Talk is spoken by the Navajo, Hopi, Apache, and Pueblo peoples. However, amongst the Navajo and Keres people, there are two unrelated sign languages also spoken: Keresan Sign Language and, by a Navajo clan with a large number of deaf members, Navajo Family Sign. Likewise, Plateau Sign Language may or may not be related to Hand Talk.

== Writing ==
Hand Talk's writing system is picture-writing in the form of petroglyphs, pictographs, and hieroglyphs. It is one of the few sign languages with a written form. As McKay-Cody writes (2019) of petroglyphic rock writing: "Although not necessarily linear, the pieces are pictographic narratives." Cherokee-Greek author Thomas King dispels the myth that "all literature in the Americas [was only] oral" in his book The Truth About Stories, a Native Narrative. "In fact, pictographic systems (petroglyphs, pictographs, and hieroglyphics) were used by a great many [nations] to commemorate events and to record stories."

Rock writing served a variety of purposes, from narratives to marking territory to locator signs akin to modern-day road signage, the latter of which would be to indicate water sources, trails through canyons, and flash-flood zone warnings. As Hand Talk is a visual-spatial language, its writing is similarly non-linear and visual. In a study on writing in Núuchi Tuvupu (Ute Country), McKay-Cody points out that since the Hand Talk spoken in the Great Basin positions the past to the left and future to the right (as opposed to American Sign Language which positions the past and future as behind and in front of the signer, respectively), rock writing of the region often similarly represent narratives chronologically from left-to-right. In contrast, Plains and Uto-Aztecan nations sign, and thus read and write, the past and future from right-to-left, such as the Lakota winter counts. Elevation, size, and direction of individual petroglyphs also encode semantics such as temporal, spatial, and other concepts.

The logographic picture writing of Hand Talk blurs the lines between art and writing. Many signs were written in the way they were signed. For example, the word for "hungry" involves an upward-facing flat hand cutting across one's stomach. Written, its glyph is of a human with a line through their stomach. However, deviating from the "standard" glyph, stylistic versions could also be drawn that are still readable to a Hand Talk speaker.

Hand Talk was not isolated to petroglyphic rock writing. Anishinaabe wiigwaasabakoon and Lakota winter counts are examples of writings on birch bark scrolls and buffalo hides, respectively. It is unknown what relation, if any, the hieroglyphic Mi'kmaw suckerfish script has with Hand Talk. During the era of colonization, Plains Sign Language was also written on paper. For example, a letter from the parents of an interned Kiowa student, Belo Cozad, was sent to Carlisle Indian School in Pennsylvania in 1890 from his parents.

== Phonology ==
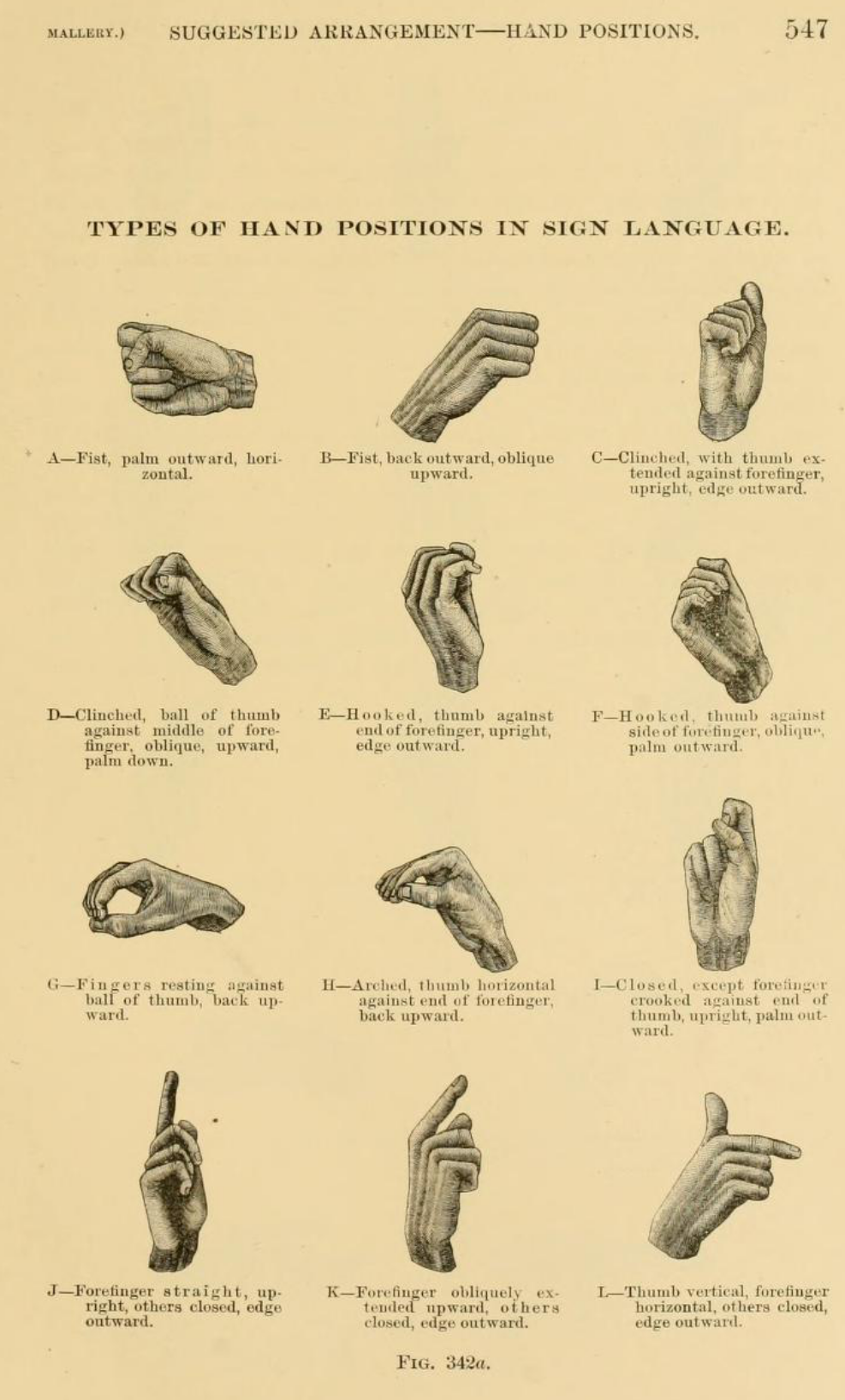
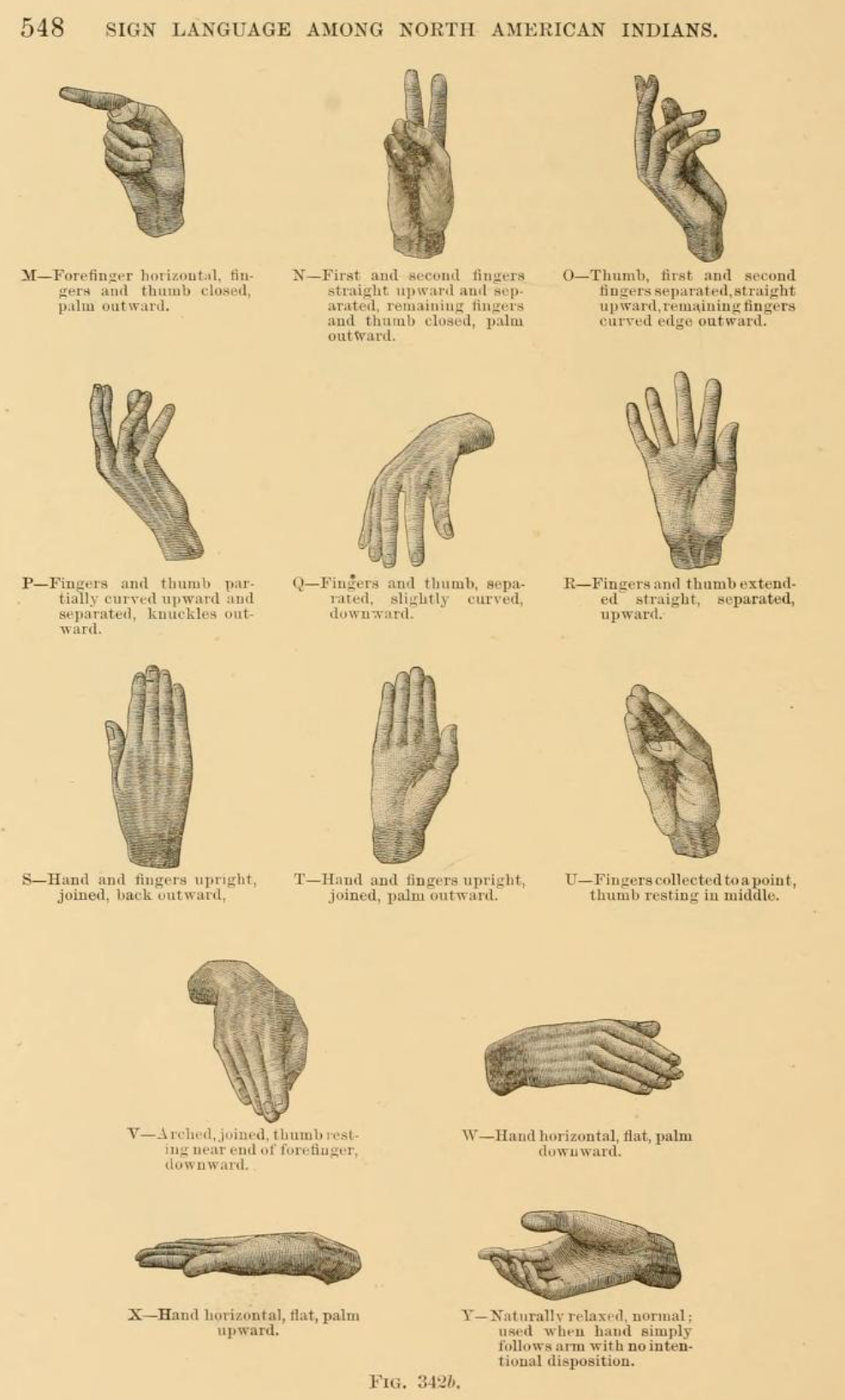
Garrick Mallery's original 1880 handshape glossary

La Mont West, working under the guidance of Alfred Kroeber and Charles F. Voegelin, was an early pioneer in not only the phonological analysis of Plains Sign Language but sign language phonology in general. In his unpublished dissertation, he developed a notation system and analysed Plains Sign Language as having eighty-two phonemes, which he called kinemes, each being able to be broken down further in terms of features. He analyzed signs as morphologically complex that others such as William Stokoe would analyze as monomorphemic, and many of his findings were later rediscovered. His study of Plains Sign Language was taking place at the same time as Stokoe's seminal studies of ASL phonology.

West analyzed Plains Sign Language as having non-isolable phonemes classified as handshapes, directions, referents, motions or motion-patterns, and dynamics. Four of these parallel the now widely recognized sign language parameters handshape, orientation, location, and movement, which arose out of Stokoe's and other researchers' later work on a variety of sign languages. The fifth, dynamic, is unique to West's analysis, though it may be present in other sign languages as well. West argued that this analysis avoids the issue of having signs consisting of a single phoneme be composed of multiple morphemes:

- Direction – paralleling vowels, there are eight distinctive directions, including the "directions" of either touching or being parallel to the referent. It can be combined with handshape to designate pointing or facing; with the referent, where it surfaces as placement; or with movement (i.e. motion dynamics), where it specifies the direction of movement.
- Handshape – paralleling consonants, nine basic handshapes can be rounded or unrounded to form a total of 18 distinct handshapes.
- Referent – numbering 40, these account for the greater phonemic inventory of Plains Sign Language compared to most spoken languages. This can be a part of the hand, head, leg, body, or an external referent.
- Motion-patterns – there are four motion-patterns consisting of the shape of any movement.

A phoneme cannot occur in isolation, although a morpheme may consist of only one phoneme.

=== Dynamics ===
There are twelve dynamic phonemes, working similarly to suprasegmentals like stress or tone in that while every sign must be made with some speed or force, only certain ones are marked. Dynamics can either change the way another phoneme, like a handshape or motion, is realized, or modify the entire package or sub-package.

==== Phoneme-level dynamics ====
Motion dynamic
By default, the movement in a motion takes place at the elbow. A motion may be articulated at the wrist instead, in which case it is said to have an additional phoneme combined with it called the motion dynamic. If wrist movement is done in addition to another movement, the motion dynamic has been combined with a long extent dynamic.
Stress

There are two phonemic stresses, tense and lax, as well as the default unmarked stress. When combined with a handshape, these correspond respectively to over- and underextension of the hand's extended parts compared to the basic handshape.

With motions, they characterize the motion as either strong and fast or weak and slow. A motion can also combine with two stress dynamics, with one specifying the tension of a motion as either tense or light, and the other the speed. When no stress dynamic is present, motions default to an intermediate force and speed, and tension is irrelevant.

Extent

The long and short phonemic extents represent lengths in a variety of contexts. With a referent, they specify that the hand is held far from or close to the referent, relative to the default distance.

With a motion, they specify the length of the motion as long or short, with the default length being mid-length. Lengthening a motion moves the articulation from the elbow to the shoulder.

They may also combine with a stress dynamic or another extent dynamic, in which case they exaggerate them.
Rounding or diphthongizing

This non-phonemic dynamic serves two purposes. It is used with the unrounded handshapes to generate the rounded handshapes, like how voicing can generate voiced consonants from unvoiced ones.

It can also be used to diphthongize any two directions to form a compromise direction midway between them, which West compared to doubly articulated consonants. He noted that while doubly articulated consonants are usually described as separate phonemes, the number of diphthongized pairs of directions in Plains Sign Language is too great to grant them all phonemic status.

==== Package-level dynamics ====
Hand-specifiers
By default, a sign can be made with either hand, though the right hand is more common. However, a sign can also be specified as being left-handed, made symmetrically with both hands, made in parallel with both hands, or made in parallel with both hands alternating.
Package-repeaters
A package can be repeated either exactly, progressively (starting where the last iteration ended), or erratically (with different, random directions each time).

=== Phonotactics ===
The smallest executable unit under West's analysis is called the package, which he compared to the spoken syllable. A package must have exactly one nucleus, a handshape and a direction, notated PO. A sub-package is defined as a single, non-diphthongized direction and its associated non-direction phonemes.

There are almost no restrictions on the co-occurrence of members of different phonemic classes within a package, especially between handshapes, directions, motion-classes, and dynamics. Since some referents are quite rare, it is difficult to tell whether there are limits to their combinatorial privileges.

Clusters of multiple phonemes of the same class within a package are, in contrast, heavily restricted. Handshapes rarely cluster, referents never do, and clustering between dynamics is limited by sub-class and extremely infrequent. Motion-patterns can only form clusters of two, where one of the motion-patterns must be oscillation/vibration. The phonemic class with the most combinatorial privilege is the direction; any two directions may be clustered using the diphthongizing dynamic.

=== Phonological processes ===
The possible forms of signs are heavily constrained. Most signs are one-handed, including all function signs, and these one-handed signs can be divided into static signs or those with movement. Two-handed signs are limited to signs where both hands are still, where one hand stays still and the other moves, or where both hands move. When both hands move, they move together in either parallel or intersecting motion. The prevalence of one-handed signs in auxiliary sign languages like Plains Sign Language may be typological, as primary sign languages tend to prefer two-handed signs.

These constraints parallel the Symmetry and Dominance Conditions later found in ASL. The Symmetry Condition requires that two-handed signs in which both hands move must be symmetrical in motion, while the Dominance Condition says that in two-handed signs involving two different handshapes, the passive hand is limited to certain movements and handshapes. Preliminary analysis has shown that Plains Sign Language seems to adhere to these conditions, and also favours unmarked handshapes.

West describes extensive allophony, the conditioning environments of which can be highly specific.

=== Prosody ===
Users of Plains Sign Language show extensive prosodic structure, which West divided into syllable-like packages and sub-packages, word-like individual signs, sentence-like phrases, and paragraph-like utterances. Except for the package and in stark contrast to most deaf sign languages, where signs often flow freely into each other, the boundaries of each of these prosodic units are consistently marked with one of three junctures:

Paragraph-final juncture
The hands are crossed or folded over the lower stomach if standing, or in the lap if sitting.
Phrase-final juncture

The hands move partway towards the paragraph-final juncture position but recoil before reaching it.

Two variants have the hands clasped near the chest or, if sitting, the palms lightly touched to the thighs, though this variant is rarer. Either of the two variants can be made emphatic, in which case a strong and audible clap or slap is made instead. The emphatic variants are more common in the northern Plains dialects of Saskatchewan and northern Alberta.

Sign-final juncture
The hands recoil slightly toward the chest or shoulder, or alternatively, a slight pause is made. The pause variant may be a marker of casual conversation as opposed to what speakers described as a more elegant register.

The paragraph-final juncture exclusively marks the beginnings and ends of complete utterances, each having approximately the length and content of a paragraph. It may be dropped at the beginning of an utterance.

The paragraph- and phrase-final junctures can be used interchangeably between signs. The paragraph-final juncture is more frequently used to separate list items and complete, sentence-like ideas, while the phrase-final juncture is preferred after incomplete ideas or dangling clauses and is more likely to appear everywhere else.

Any signs not separated by either the paragraph- or phrase-final juncture are near-universally separated by the sign-final juncture, as well as packages within an open compound, where multiple signs are used as a unit to refer to some idea or thing. Paragraph- and phrase-final junctures are extremely rare within open compounds. The largest units not separated by a juncture at all are unit signs, which can be a single package, a package and a handshape or terminal referent, a repeated package, or a closed compound, where multiple signs form a new sign.

== See also ==
- Plateau Sign Language
- Oneida Sign Language
- American Sign Language
- Indigenous peoples of the Americas
- Indigenous peoples of the Northeastern Woodlands
- Indigenous peoples of the Great Basin
