= Irit Meir =

Israeli linguist (1957–2018)

- עירית מאיר
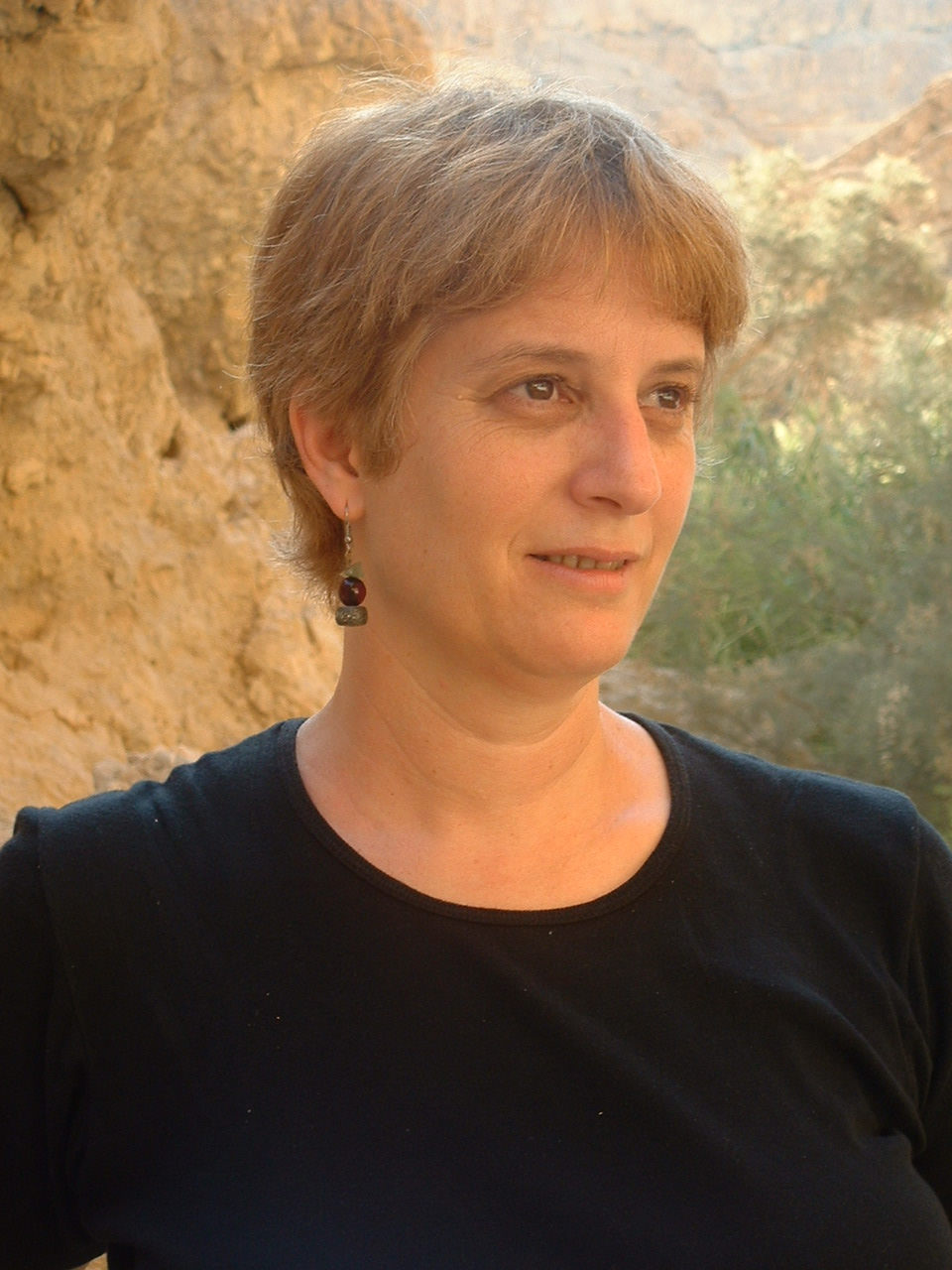
- Irit Meir in Dead Sea, Israel, 2004
- Born: Irit Eisenstadt; August 18, 1957; Jerusalem, Israel
- Died: February 23, 2018 (aged 60); Kiryat Tiv'on, Israel
- Known for: Israeli Sign Language
- Spouse(s): Ron Meir, Technion – Israel Institute of Technology
- Children: 3

Academic background
- Education: Gymnasia Rehavia
- Alma mater: Hebrew University of Jerusalem
- Thesis: Thematic Structure and Verb Agreement in Israeli Sign Language (1998)
- Doctoral advisor: Yehuda Falk, Hebrew University of Jerusalem; Wendy Sandler, University of Haifa
- Other advisors: Professor Yael Ziv, Hebrew University of Jerusalem

Academic work
- Discipline: Linguist
- Sub-discipline: Sign language linguistics
- Institutions: University of Haifa
- Website: signlab.haifa.ac.il/index.php/2013-01-16-09-49-17/irit-meir

Irit Meir: Thematic Structure and Verb Agreement in Israeli Sign Language, submitted to the Hebrew University of Jerusalem, 1998

Irit Meir (Hebrew: עירית מאיר; August 18, 1957 – February 23, 2018) was an Israeli linguist, who specialized in the linguistics of sign languages. She was an associate professor in the Department of Hebrew Language and the Department of Communication Sciences and Disorders at the University of Haifa, and the associate director of the Sign Language Research Lab.

== Early life ==
Irit Meir was born Irit Eisenstadt on August 18, 1957 in Jerusalem. Her parents were Professor Shmuel Noah Eisenstadt, an Israeli sociologist, and Shulamit.

During her school years, Irit was involved with the Israeli Scout Movement, where she was a leader. She participated in several Israeli youth delegations to the USA and Europe, and was involved in social and voluntary activities during her school years. She also played the flute for years. Meir finished high school at the top of her class, serving as valedictorian at its graduation ceremony. In 1975 she spent a pre-induction year of social work in the southern town of Mitzpe Ramon.

Her army service was with the IDF Intelligence Corps, in which she furthered her studies of the Arabic language.

== Career in linguistics ==
Irit Meir obtained her PhD in 1998 from the Hebrew University of Jerusalem. Her thesis was entitled, "Thematic structure and verb agreement in Israeli Sign Language." The syntax and semantics of verb agreement was one central strand of her research on sign languages. Another was iconicity.

Meir wrote a book on Israeli Sign Language aimed at the general public with Wendy Sandler (Meir & Sandler 2007).

In collaboration with Mark Aronoff, Carol Padden and Wendy Sandler, Meir made fundamental contributions to the investigation of the emergence of language with her research on Al-Sayyid Bedouin Sign Language. Their research is featured in the popular science book, Talking Hands, by Margalit Fox.

Meir was also a scholar of Modern Hebrew, serving on a committee for linguistic terminology in the national Academy of the Hebrew Language. She authored articles on the linguistics of Modern Hebrew and, with Moshe Bar-Asher, co-edited Nit'e Ilan: Studies in Hebrew and Related Fields.

== Selected publications ==
- Meir, Irit. 2002. A cross-modality perspective on verb agreement. Natural Language and Linguistic Theory 20, 413–450.
- Meir, Irit. 2010. Iconicity and metaphor: constraints on metaphorical extension of iconic forms. Language 96, 865–896.
- Meir, Irit & Wendy Sandler. 2007. A Language in Space: the Story of Israeli Sign Language. Psychology Press.
- Sandler, Wendy, Aronoff, Mark, Padden, Carol & Meir, Irit. (2014). Language emergence. In J. Sindell, P. Kockelman & N. Enfield (Eds.), The Cambridge handbook of linguistic anthropology (pp. 250–284). Cambridge: Cambridge University Press.
- Sandler, Wendy, Meir, Irit, Padden, Carol & Aronoff, Mark. 2005. The emergence of grammar: Systematic structure in a new language. PNAS 102, 2661–2665.
- Sandler, Wendy, Aronoff, Mark, Meir, Irit, Padden, Carol. (2011). The Gradual Emergence of Phonological Form in a New Language. Natural Language and Linguistic Theory 29, 503–543.
