= Pronunciation =

Way a word or a language is spoken

Pronunciation is the way in which a word or a language is spoken. In American Sign Language, pronunciation describes how a sign is constructed.

This may refer to generally agreed-upon sequences of sounds used in speaking a given word or all language in a specific dialect—"correct" or "standard" pronunciation—or simply the way a particular individual speaks a word or language.

Words' pronunciations can be found in reference works such as dictionaries. General-purpose dictionaries typically only include standard pronunciations, but regional or dialectal pronunciations may be found in more specific works. Orthoepy is the study of the pronunciation of a language.

Pronunciation can vary among individuals and groups based on factors such as childhood cultural exposure, current place of residence, speech or voice disorders, their ethnic group, their social class, or their education.

== Linguistic terminology ==
Syllables are combinations of units of sound (phones), for example "goo" has one syllable made up of [g] and [u]. The branch of linguistics which studies these units of sound is phonetics. Phones which play the same role are grouped together into classes called phonemes; the study of these is phonemics or phonematics or phonology. Phones as components of articulation are usually described using the International Phonetic Alphabet (IPA).

== See also ==
- Elision
- Elocution
- Epenthesis
- Help:IPA/English — the principal key used in Wikipedia articles to transcribe the pronunciation of English words
- Help:Pronunciation respelling key — a secondary key for pronunciation which mimics English orthography
- Metathesis (linguistics)
