= Wendy Sandler =

American-Israeli linguist

- ונדי סנדלר
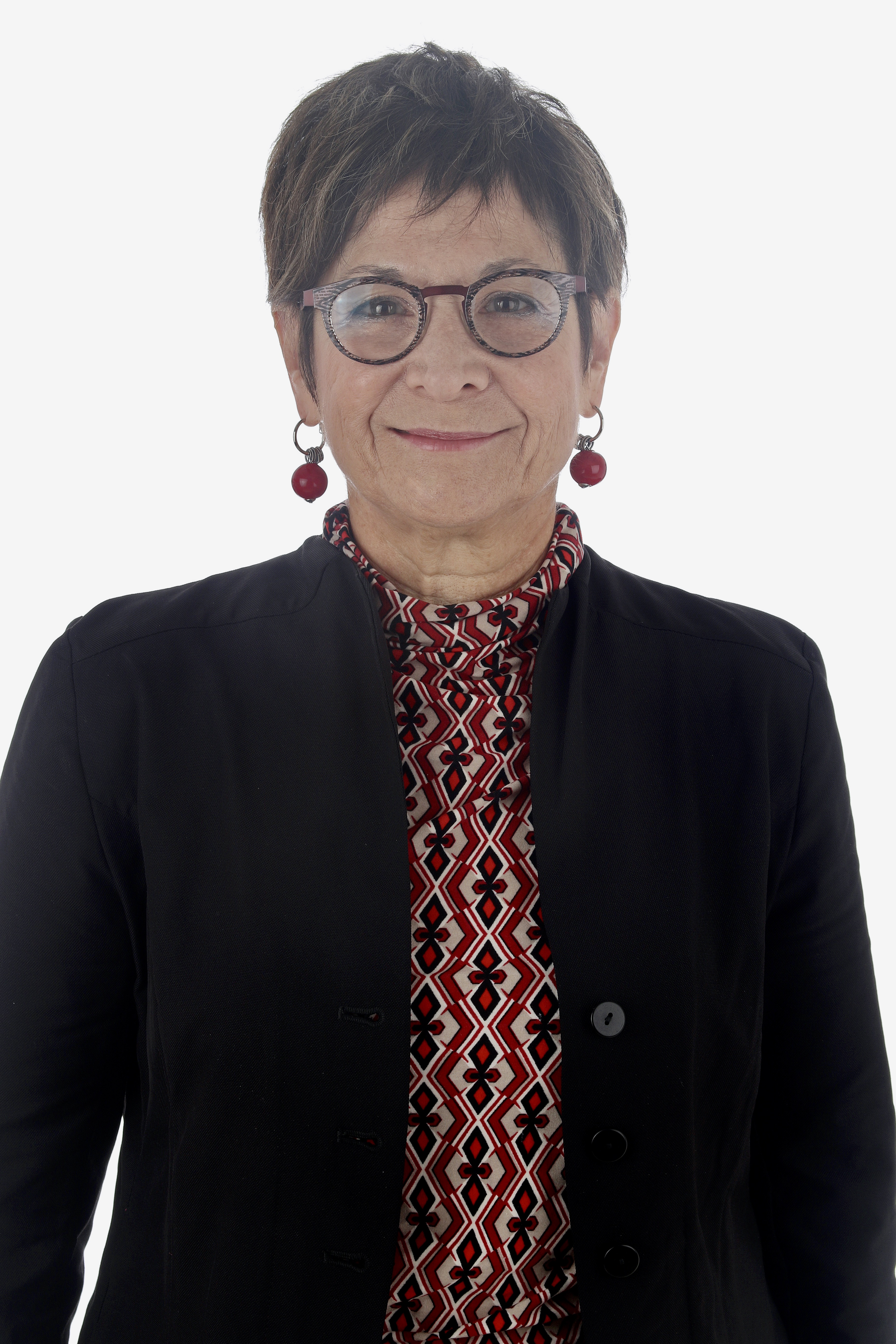
- Occupations: Linguist; professor
- Known for: Research on the phonology of Sign Languages

Academic background
- Education: University of Texas at Austin

Wendy Sandler (Hebrew: ונדי סנדלר; born 1949, Cleveland, Ohio) is an American-Israeli linguist who is known for her research on the phonology of Sign Languages.

== Career and research ==
Sandler earned her PhD in linguistics from the University of Texas at Austin in 1987, with a dissertation entitled "Sequentiality and simultaneity in American Sign Language." A revised version of her dissertation was published in 1989 under the title, "Phonological Representation of the Sign: Linearity and Nonlinearity in Sign Language Phonology."

After her dissertation, Sandler took up a position at the University of Haifa, Israel, where she became a Professor of Linguistics in the Department of English Language and Literature. She was also the Founding Director of the Sign Language Research Lab there.

Sandler has co-written a book on Israeli Sign Language with Irit Meir (Meir & Sandler 2007). With Diane Lillo-Martin, she has co-authored a standard linguistic introduction to the phonology and syntax of American Sign Language (Sandler & Lillo-Martin 2006).

In collaboration with Mark Aronoff, Irit Meir and Carol Padden, Sandler has made fundamental contributions to the investigation of the emergence of language with her research on Al-Sayyid Bedouin Sign Language. This research is featured in Talking Hands, by Margalit Fox.

== Honors and awards ==
In December 2017, Sandler won a prize of 150,000 Israeli new shekels from Mifal HaPayis for her conceptual research systems while following new sign languages which are being converted into functional communication, including a sign language of a Bedouin community in Israel.

During 2014–2018, Sandler led a European Research Council (ERC) Advanced Grant entitled, "The Grammar of the Body: Revealing the Foundations of Compositionality in Human Language" (GRAMBY).

In 2020, Sandler was elected to the American Academy of Arts and Sciences.

== Key publications ==
- Sandler, Wendy. 1989. Phonological Representation of the Sign: Linearity and Nonlinearity in Sign Language Phonology. Dordrecht: Foris.
- Sandler, Wendy and Diane Lillo-Martin. 2006. Sign Language and Linguistic Universals. Cambridge University Press.
- Meir, Irit & Wendy Sandler. 2007. A Language in Space: the Story of Israeli Sign Language. Psychology Press.
- Sandler, Wendy, Aronoff, Mark, Padden, Carol & Meir, Irit. (2014). Language emergence. In J. Sindell, P. Kockelman & N. Enfield (Eds.), The Cambridge handbook of linguistic anthropology (pp. 250–284). Cambridge: Cambridge University Press.
- Sandler, Wendy, Meir, Irit, Padden, Carol & Aronoff, Mark. 2005. The emergence of grammar: Systematic structure in a new language. PNAS 102, 2661–2665.
- Sandler, Wendy. (2012). Dedicated gestures in the emergence of sign language. Gesture 12/3, 265–307.
- Sandler, Wendy, Aronoff, Mark, Meir, Irit, Padden, Carol. (2011). The Gradual Emergence of Phonological Form in a New Language. Natural Language and Linguistic Theory 29, 503–543.
- Sandler, Wendy. (2010). The phonology of movement in sign language. In Blackwell companion to phonology, Marc van Oostendorp, Colin Ewen, Keren Rice, and Elizabeth Hume (Eds.), Oxford: Wiley-Blackwell. 577–603.
