= Shmuel Eisenstadt =

Israeli sociologist and writer

- שמואל נח אייזנשטדט
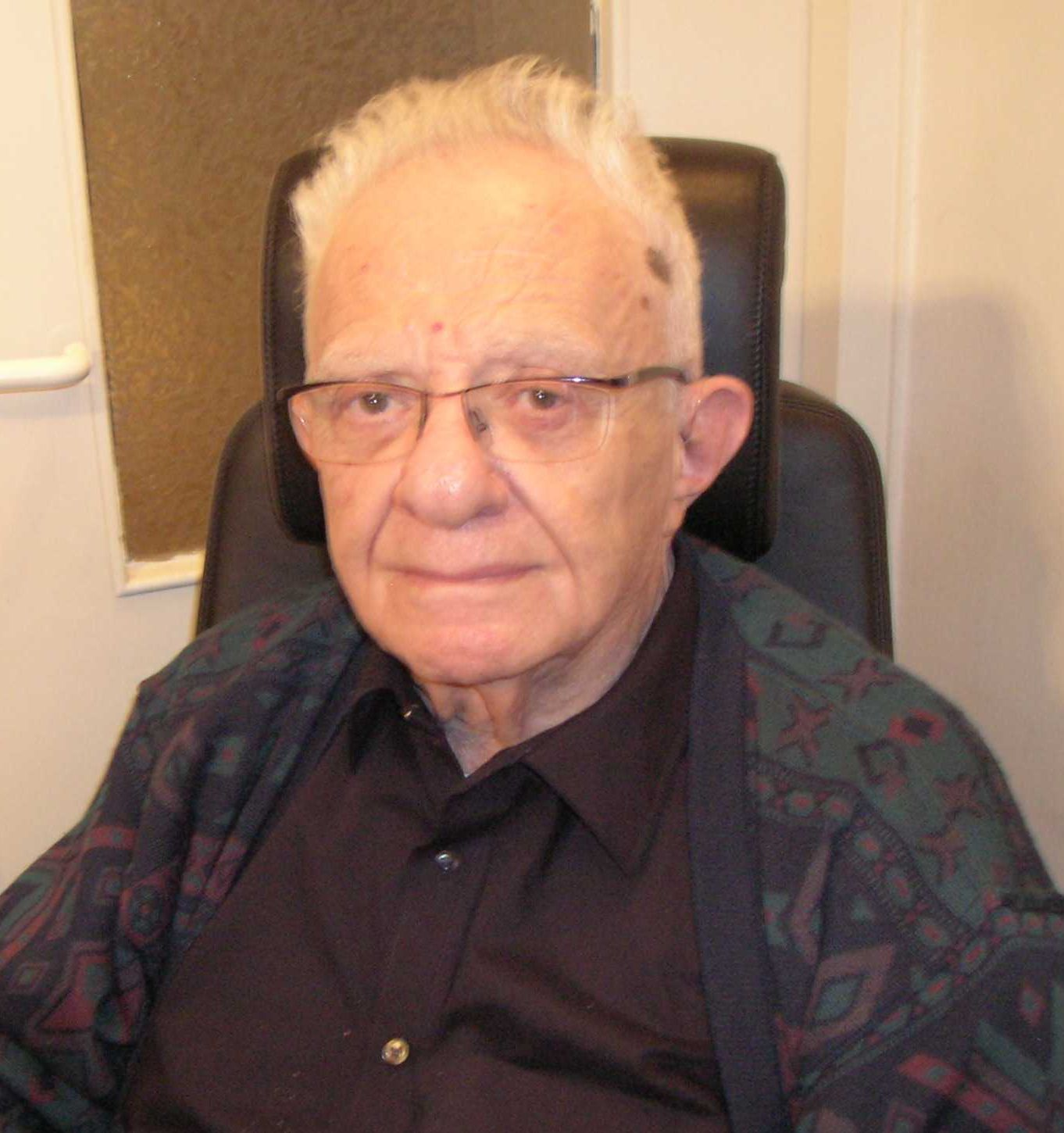
- Eisenstadt (March 2008)
- Born: Shmuel Noah Eisenstadt; September 10, 1923; Warsaw, Second Polish Republic
- Died: September 2, 2010 (aged 86); Jerusalem, Israel
- Education: Hebrew University of Jerusalem
- Awards: Israel Prize (1973), Balzan Prize (1988), Max Planck Research Prize (1994), Holberg International Memorial Prize (2006)
- Scientific career
- Fields: Sociology
- Workplaces: Hebrew University of Jerusalem
- Doctoral advisor: Martin Buber

Shmuel Noah Eisenstadt (Hebrew: שמואל נח אייזנשטדט; 10 September 1923 – 2 September 2010) was an Israeli sociologist and writer. He was particularly known as a "sociologist of youth," an analyst of civilizations, and a theorist of "multiple modernities." He was the named chair Rose Isaacs professor of sociology at the Hebrew University in Jerusalem from 1949 to his retirement emeritus in 1990, after which he continued to write and teach. He received awards including the Israel Prize (1973), the Balzan Prize (1988), the Humboldt Research Award (2002), and the Holberg Prize (2006).

== Early life and education ==
Eisenstadt was born in 1923 in Warsaw, Poland. In the early 1930s, his widowed mother took him to Jerusalem and he was educated in Palestine from the age of 12. In 1940, Eisenstadt studied at the Hebrew University of Jerusalem where he received his M.A. (1944) and Ph.D. (1947) in sociology under the advisorship of Martin Buber.

== Career ==
After the 1947–48 school year, Eisenstadt returned to the Hebrew University of Jerusalem to be an assistant lecturer. Eisenstadt later served as the Chairman of the Department of Sociology from 1950 to 1969 and also served as Dean of the Faculty of Humanities for a few years. He was made Rose Isaacs professor in 1959 and held this title through his retirement in 1990.

From 1990 until his death in September 2010 he was professor emeritus. He held countless guest professorships and fellowships, at the University of Chicago, Harvard University, the University of Zurich, the University of Vienna, the University of Bern, Stanford, the University of Heidelberg and the Swedish Collegium for Advanced Study, among others. Eisenstadt received a number of prizes, including the Balzan Prize and the Max-Planck research prize. He was also the 2006 winner of the Holberg International Memorial Prize. He was a member of many academies, including the American Academy of Arts and Sciences and the Advisory Editors Council of the Social Evolution & History Journal. His daughter Irit Meir was a noted scholar of Israeli Sign Language.

In the field of sociology he became known as a "sociologist of youth" (after a term in From Generation to Generation, a work closely related to the ideas of Talcott Parsons). However:

Eisenstadt's research contributed considerably to the understanding that the modern trend of a eurocentric interpretation of the cultural program developed in the west is a natural development model seen in all societies ... the European model is not the only one: it was merely the earliest. It started the trend. But social reactions, whether in the USA, Canada, Japan or in Southeast Asia took place with completely different cultural reagents. (Frankfurter Rundschau, March 22, 2000)

Eisenstadt contributed to the understanding of cultures and civilizations. As a social scientist, "Eisenstadt has focused on the interplay between cultural and structural processes of change and on inherent tensions and antinomies rather than on uniform process of development" Eisenstadt researched broad themes of social change, modernities and civilizations. One of his arguments is that "fundamentalism is not a traditional but a modern phenomenon".

Eisenstadt summed up his views by saying "I try to understand what was the historical experience of the great civilizations...to try to understand the major dynamics of these civilizations and how they became modern societies, how they modernize and how they develop different cultural programs of modernity".

In honor of Eisenstadt's contributions to sociology Erik Cohen, Moshe Lissak, and Uri Almagor compiled Comparative Social Dynamics: Essays in Honor of S.N Eisenstadt. The contributions of this book were written by Eisenstadt's former students and colleagues at the Department of Sociology and Social Anthropology of the Hebrew University of Jerusalem. The articles relate to Eisenstadt's major themes in the study of cultures, modernization, and social and political change. Eisenstadt's work touches many different fields of sociology, time periods, and cultures and the editors felt the leading concept of Eisenstadt's work was social dynamics.

== Honors ==
- The McIver Prize of the American Sociological Association in 1964;
- The Rothschild Prize in Social Sciences in 1970;
- The Israel Prize in social sciences in 1973;
- The International Balzan Prize in 1988;
- The Max Planck Award for Social Sciences in 1994;
- The Amalfi Prize for Sociology and Social Sciences in 2001;
- The Humboldt Research Award in 2002;
- The EMET Prize in Sociology in 2005;
- The Holberg International Memorial Prize in 2006 from the Norwegian Parliament. This prize awarded Eisenstadt for outstanding scholarly work in the fields of the arts and humanities, social sciences, law and theology;
- An honorary doctorate from Warsaw University in 2005;
- An Honorary Degree from Harvard University.

Eisenstadt was a member of: Israeli Academy of Sciences, Honorary Foreign Members of the American Philosophical Society (1973), Foreign Associates of the National Academy of Sciences in the U.S., Honorary Foreign Members at the American Academy of Arts and Sciences, Honorary Foreign Research Fellows at the Institute of Sociology of the Chinese Academy of Social Sciences, Honorary Fellows of the London School of Economics and Political Sciences.

In 2010 a festschrift, Collective Identities, States and Globalization; Essays in honour of S.N. Eisenstadt was published in Eisenstadt's honor.

== Selected works ==
- The Political System of Empires (1963)
- Modernization, Protest, and Change (1966)
- Revolution and the Transformation of Societies (1978)
- Tradition, Wandel und Modernität (1979)
- Patrons, Clients and Friends: Interpersonal Relations and the Structure of Trust in Society, with Luis Roniger (1984)
- European Civilization in a Comparative Perspective (1987)
- Die Transformation der israelischen Gesellschaft (1987)
- Kulturen der Achsenzeit (Hrsg.), five volumes (1987 and 1992)
- Japanese Civilization – A Comparative View (1996)
- Die Antinomien der Moderne
- Die Vielfalt der Moderne
- Theorie und Moderne (2006)

== See also ==
- List of Israel Prize recipients
