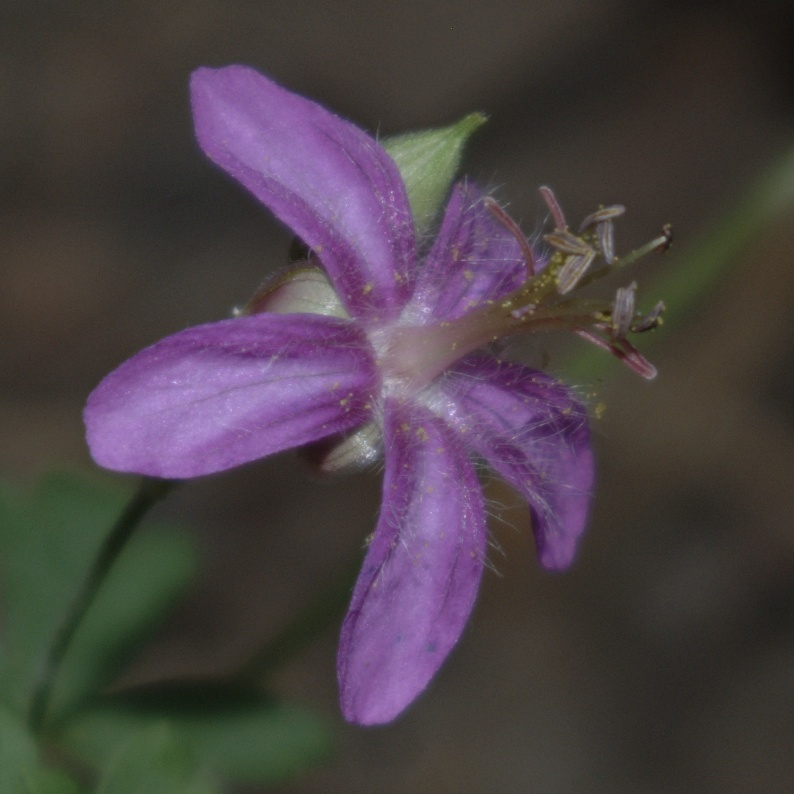

Conservation status
- Apparently Secure (NatureServe)

Scientific classification
- Kingdom: Plantae
- Clade: Tracheophytes
- Clade: Angiosperms
- Clade: Eudicots
- Clade: Rosids
- Order: Geraniales
- Family: Geraniaceae
- Genus: Geranium
- Species: G. caespitosum

Binomial name
- Geranium caespitosum E.James, 1823

Synonyms
- List: Geranium atropurpureum A.Heller (1898); Geranium cowenii Rydb. (1907); Geranium eremophilum Wooton & Standl. (1913); Geranium fremontii Torr. ex A.Gray (1849); Geranium furcatum Hanks (1907); Geranium gracile Engelm. (1849); Geranium intermedium E.James (1823); Geranium marginale Rydb. (1907); Geranium parryi A.Heller (1900); Geranium pattersonii Rydb. (1902); Geranium pentagynum Engelm. (1848); Geranium toquimense N.H.Holmgren & A.H.Holmgren (1974)

= Geranium caespitosum =

Plant species in the geranium family

Geranium caespitosum, the purple cluster geranium or pineywoods geranium, is a perennial herb native to the western United States and northern Mexico. Its US distribution includes Arizona, Colorado, Nevada, New Mexico, Texas, Utah, and Wyoming.

It has a purple to red flower with 5 stamens, and the sepals are acuminate, tapering with a long point. It has palmately lobed leaves. The fruit is a schizocarp made up of 5 mericarps. Flowers bloom May to September. Geranium caespitosum has fleshy roots that penetrate deeply into the soil. It grows in damp soils, as in the understory of coniferous forests and in canyons.

== Uses ==
The Gosiute use the plant as an astringent and a decoction of the root to treat diarrhea. The Keres use roots crushed into a paste to treat sores, and the whole plant as turkey food.

=== Cultivation ===
The pineywoods geranium is grown in xeriscape and native plant gardens for their well displayed pink flowers.

== Varieties ==
The four varieties may known by the following common names:

- G. c. var. caespitosum – pineywoods geranium
- G. c. var. eremophilum – purple cluster geranium
- G. c. var. fremontii – Fremont's geranium
- G. c. var. parryi – Parry's geranium

In the United States, all four varieties are found in Arizona and New Mexico, and the purple cluster geranium is only found there. The other varieties are all found in Colorado, Utah, and Wyoming, and the pineywoods variety extends into Nevada and Texas.

== Image gallery ==
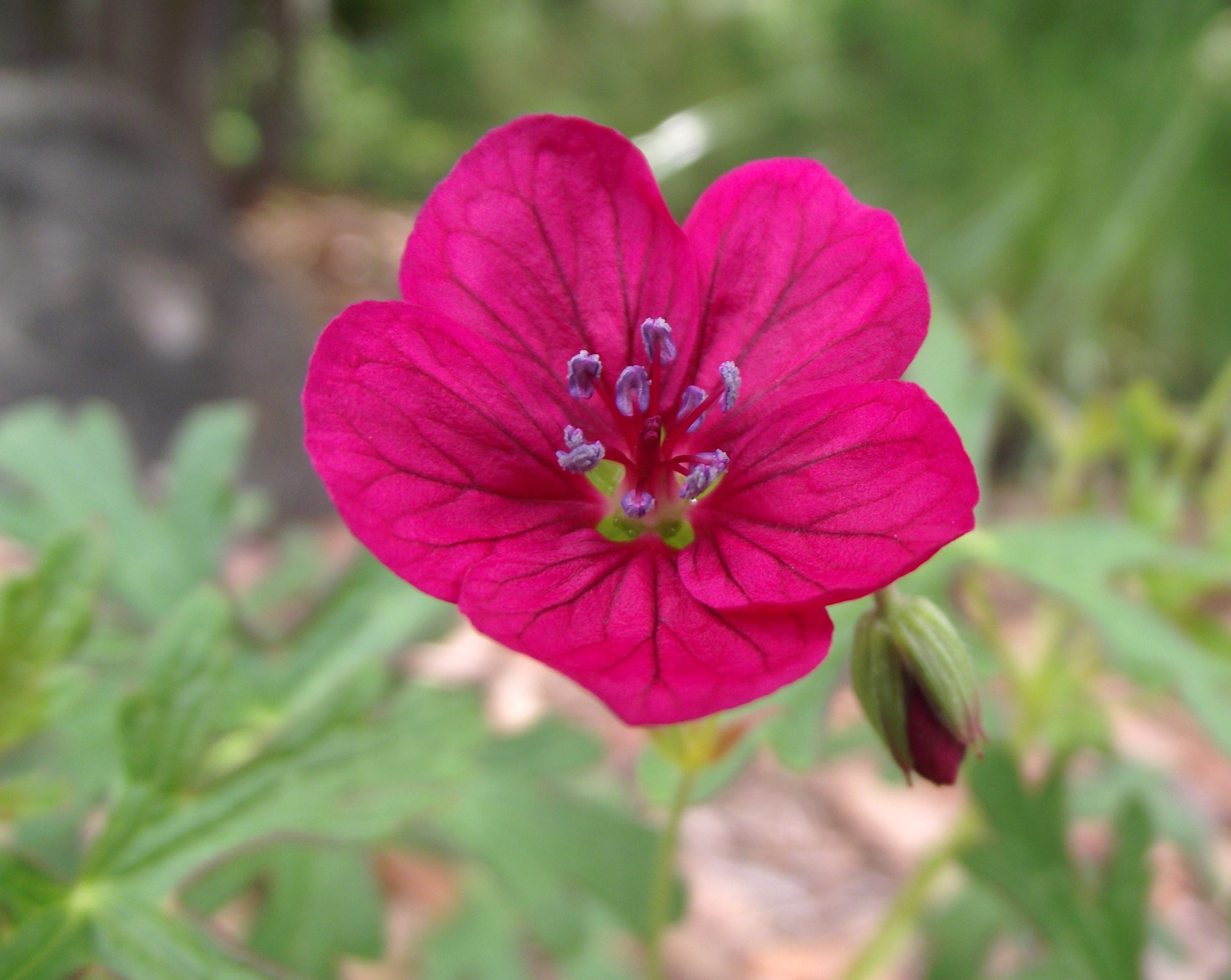
red individual

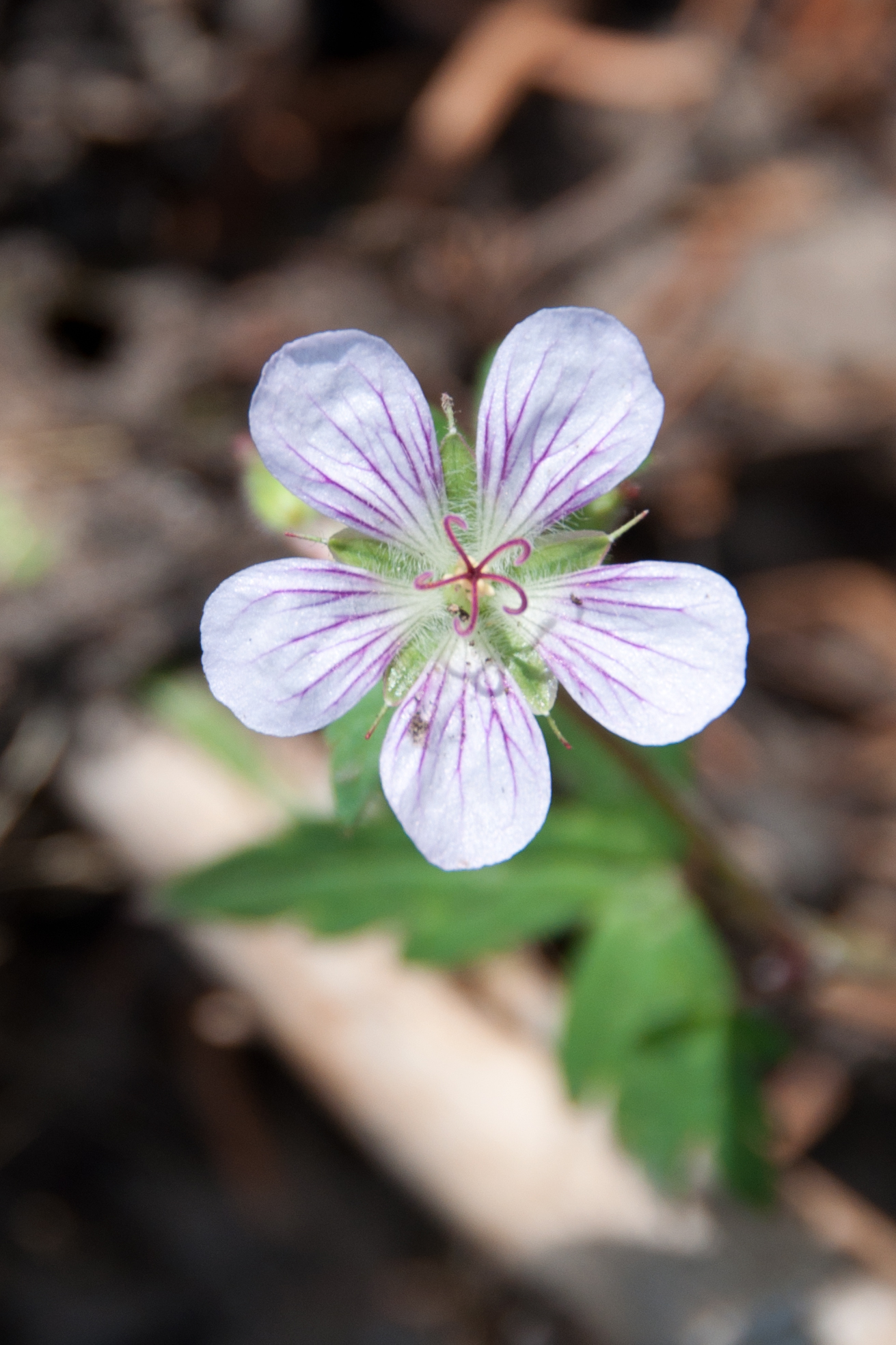
lilac individual

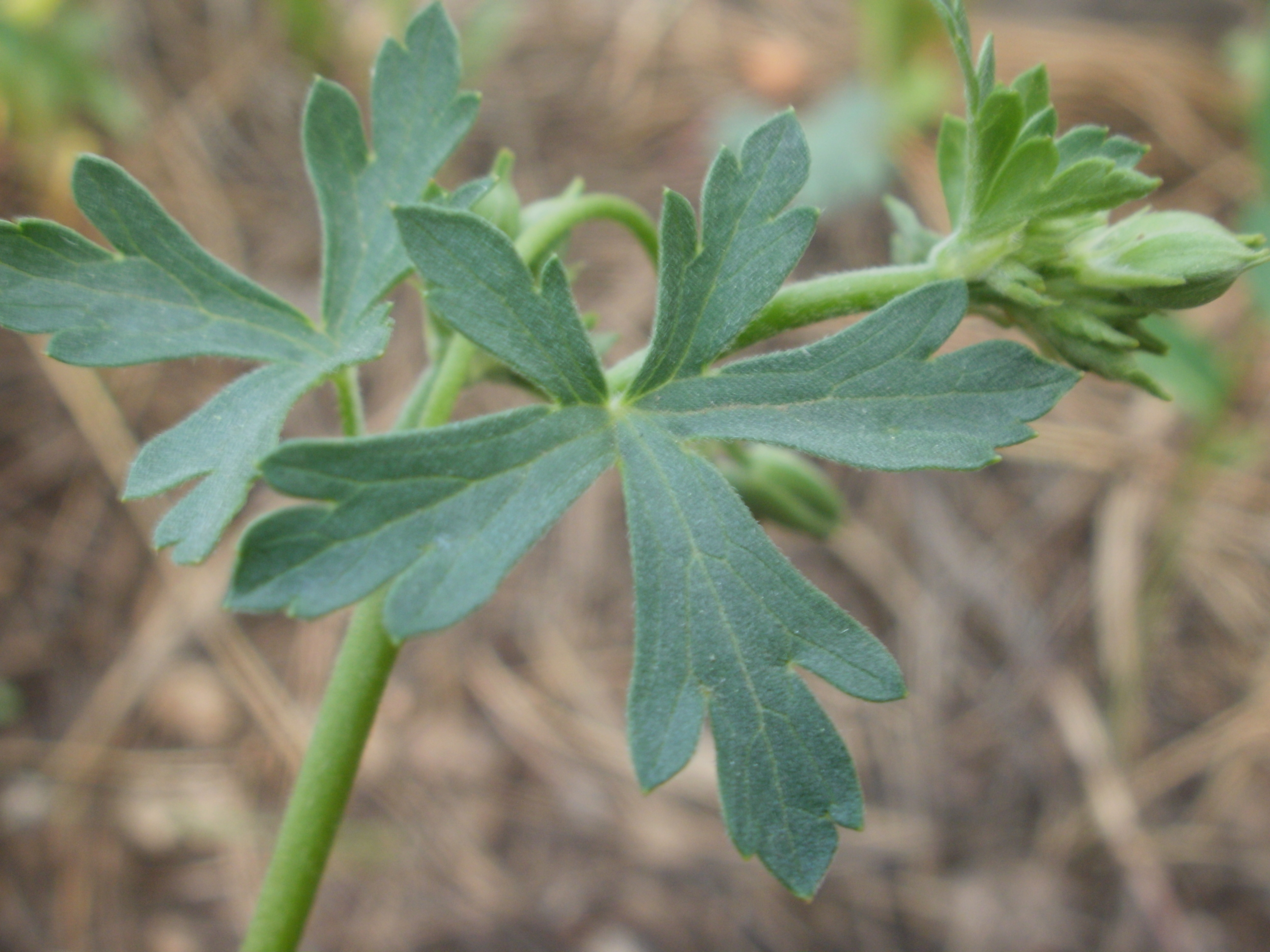
foliage

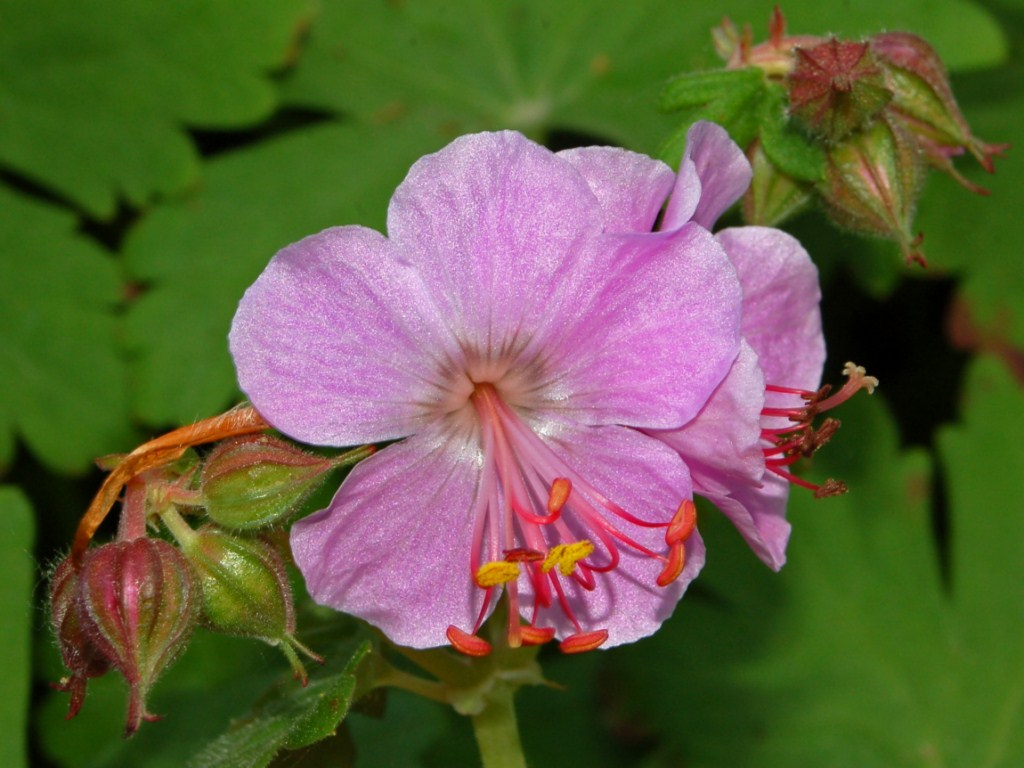
var. fremontii

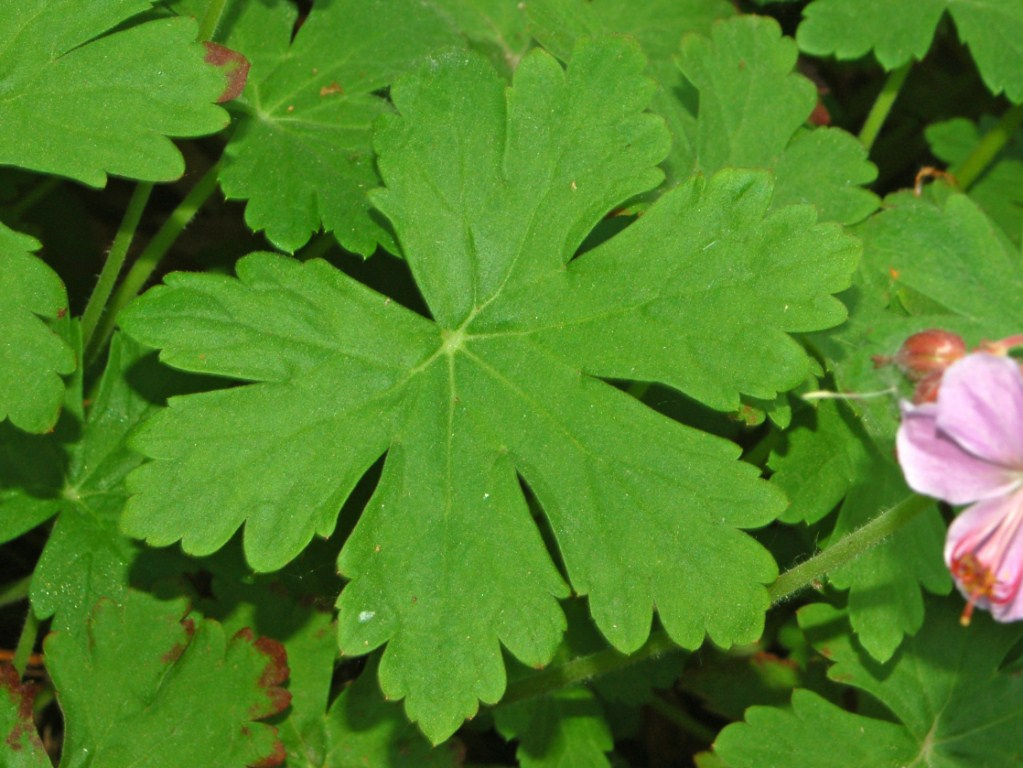
var. fremontii
