= Plateau Sign Language =

Extinct indigenous sign language of the Pacific Northwest

- Langue des Signes du Plateau
- Native to: Canada, United States
- Region: Columbia Plateau
- Ethnicity: Various First Nations and Native Americans of the Columbia Plateau region
- Native speakers: 1-2 rememberers (2017)
- Language family: contact pidgin
- Writing system: none

Language codes
- ISO 639-3: None (mis)
- Glottolog: None

- Maps of the various sign languages of Turtle Island (North America), excluding Francosign languages. Plateau Sign Language is labelled in orange as "PSL"

Plateau Sign Language, or Old Plateau Sign Language, is a poorly attested, extinct sign language historically used across the Columbian Plateau. The Crow Tribe introduced Plains Sign Talk, which replaced Plateau Sign Language among the eastern nations that used it (the Coeur d’Alene, Sanpoil, Okanagan, Thompson, Lakes, Shuswap, and Colville), with western nations shifting instead to Chinook Jargon.
