= Keresan Sign Language =

Village sign language used in New Mexico, United States

- Native to: United States
- Region: one of the Keres pueblos
- Ethnicity: Keres
- Native speakers: 15 deaf (2003); Known by many of the 650 inhabitants of the pueblo
- Language family: village sign

Language codes
- ISO 639-3: None (mis)
- Glottolog: kere1299 Keresan Pueblo Indian Sign Language

Keresan Sign Language, also known as Keresan Pueblo Indian Sign Language (KPISL) or Keresign, is a village sign language spoken by many of the inhabitants of a Keresan pueblo with a relatively high incidence of congenital deafness (the pueblo is not identified in sources, but the cited population suggests it is Zia Pueblo, New Mexico).

Keresan Sign Language developed locally, and is unrelated to the trade language Plains Indian Sign Language.
