= Keres people =

Pueblo peoples

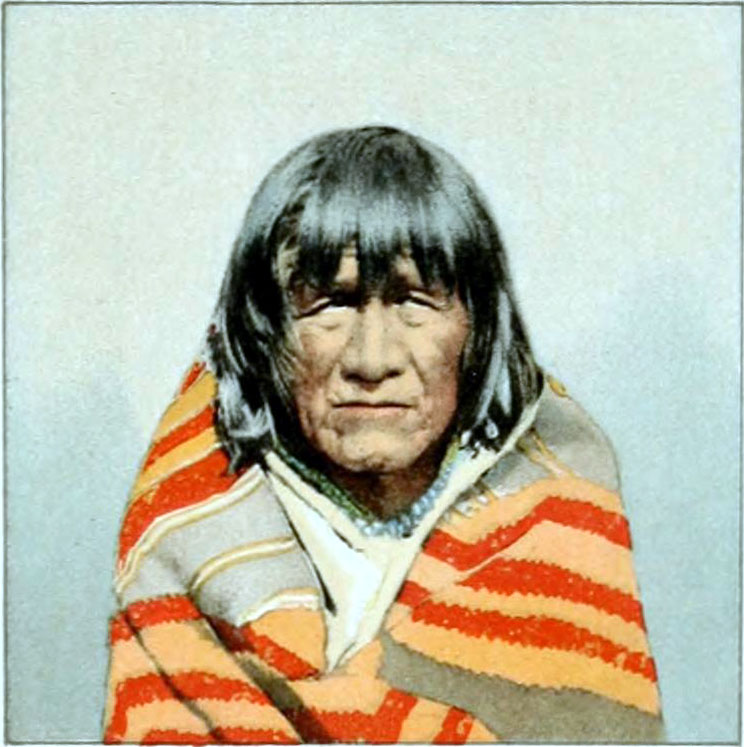
An elderly woman of the Cochiti Pueblo tribe, 1905, colorized

The Keres people are one of the Pueblo peoples. They speak English, Keresan languages, and in one pueblo Keresan Sign Language.

The seven Keres pueblos are:

- Cochiti Pueblo or Kotyit ("Stone Kiva"); Cochiti Pueblo people: Kotyitiemeh ("People of the North Mountains, i.e. Cochiti people")
- San Felipe Pueblo or Katishtya (People down by the river ”The place where the White Shells are”)
- Kewa Pueblo (previously Santo Domingo) or Díiwʾi; Kewa Pueblo people: Dîiwʾamʾé
- Zia Pueblo or Tsi'ya (Tsia) ("Sun Symbol"); Zia Pueblo people: Tsʾíiyʾamʾé
- Santa Ana Pueblo or Tamaiya (Dámáyá); Santa Ana Pueblo people: Dámáyámʾé (sing.) or Dámáyàamʾèetrạ (pl.)
- Acoma Pueblo or Aak'u (Áakʾuʾé or Haak'u) ("Place That Always Was", better known as "Sky City"); Acoma Pueblo people: Áakʾùumʾé (″Acoma People")
- Laguna Pueblo or Kawaika (Kawaik) ("Lake"); Laguna Pueblo people: Kʾáwáigamʾé ("People at/from the Small Lake")

The western pueblos, Acoma and Laguna, are the largest by area.

== History ==
Phenotypic trait data from remains suggests affinities between Keres populations and Ancestral Puebloan communities at Chaco Canyon and the Zuni-Cibola Complex. Based on biological evidence and Cochiti oral tradition, the Keres likely entered the Rio Grande drainage from the west in the early 1300s, perhaps following the depopulation of the El Morro Valley.

== Ethnobotany ==
- Abronia fragrans – The Keres people mix ground roots of the plant with corn flour, and eat to gain weight. They also use this mixture to keep from becoming greedy, and they make ceremonial necklaces from the plant.
- Acer negundo – Twigs are made into prayer sticks.
- Commelina dianthifolia – Infusion of plant used as a strengthener for weakened tuberculosis patients.
- Geranium caespitosum – Roots crushed into a paste to treat sores, and whole plant as turkey food.
