= Oneida Sign Language =

Indigenous sign language isolate

Oneida Sign Language (OSL)
- Onʌyoteˀa·ká· Sign Language
- Native to: Canada, United States
- Region: Haudenosauneega
- Ethnicity: Oneida
- Language family: Hand Talk: Mixed: Northeast Hand Talk, ASL, Onʌyoteˀa·ká·; Oneida Sign Language (OSL)

Language codes
- ISO 639-3: –
- IETF: psd-u-sd-caon
- Maps of the sign languages of Turtle Island (North America), showing OSL in purple.

Oneida Sign Language (OSL) is a revived language with roots in Hand Talk mixed with American Sign Language and the oral Oneida language. Alongside Elder Olive Elm, Deaf Elders in the Turtle and Bear Clans—Marsha and Max Ireland, respectively, of the Oneida Nation of the Thames—have worked since 2016 to build and support the growth of OSL.

== See also ==
- American Sign Language
- Plains Sign Talk
