= Mark Aronoff =

Canadian-American linguist (born 1949)

- Born: January 1949 (age 77); Montreal, Québec, Canada
- Citizenship: American

Academic background
- Education: Massachusetts Institute of Technology (Ph.D.), McGill University
- Thesis: Word-Structure (1974)
- Doctoral advisor: Morris Halle

Academic work
- Institutions: Stony Brook University
- Website: https://linguistics.stonybrook.edu/faculty/mark.aronoff

Mark Aronoff (/ˈærənɒf/; born January 1949) is a Canadian-American morphologist and distinguished professor emeritus at Stony Brook University. The editor of Language from 1995 to 2001 and president of the Linguistic Society of America in 2005, he has been elected a fellow of both the American Association for the Advancement of Science and the American Academy of Arts and Sciences.

== Education and academic career ==
Born and raised in Québec, Canada, Aronoff graduated from McGill University in 1969 with a B.A. in Linguistics, completing his Ph.D. in Linguistics at M.I.T. in 1974.

Upon completing his Ph.D., Aronoff took a position as an assistant professor of linguistics at the State University of New York at Stony Brook, which he has called “the only real job I have had in my life.” Promoted to Full Professor a few years later, Aronoff served as Chair of the Department of Linguistics from 1980 to 1993.

In addition to his scholarly output and teaching, Aronoff has a strong commitment to professional service, within both his university and his field. From 1998 to 2010, he served in the administration of the State University of New York as Associate Provost for Undergraduate Education. This overlapped with his tenure, from 1995 to 2001, as editor of Language (the journal of the Linguistic Society of America), as well as his term as president of the LSA in 2005.

== Books (selected) ==
- Aronoff, Mark; Fudeman, Kirsten (2011). What is Morphology?. Wiley-Blackwell. ISBN 978-1444351767.
- Aronoff, Mark (1994). Morphology by Itself: Stems and Inflectional Classes. Boston: MIT Press. ISBN 0262510723.
- Aronoff, Mark (1976). Word Formation in Generative Grammar. Boston: MIT Press. ISBN 0262510170.

== Personal life ==
Aronoff is married to Donna Di Donato, a former assistant provost for undergraduate academic affairs at Stony Brook. He has three children from his previous marriage.
