= American Sign Language phonology =

Phonemes of American Sign Language

American Sign Language (ASL) and other sign languages are characterized by phonological processes analogous to those of spoken languages. Phonemes serve the same role between spoken and sign languages: the main difference is spoken language phonemes are based on sound and sign language phonemes are spatial and temporal. Research into phonotactics in ASL is ongoing, but literature has largely agreed upon the Symmetry and Dominance Conditions as phonotactic constraints. Allophones perform the same in ASL as they do in spoken languages, where different phonemes can cause free variation, or complementary and contrastive distribution. There is assimilation between phonemes depending on the context around the sign when it is being produced. The brain processes spoken and signed language the same in terms of the linguistic properties, however, there is differences in activation between the auditory and visual cortex for language perception.

== Phonemes ==
Signs are made up of parts, called phonemes. Sign phonemes were originally called cheremes by William Stokoe and his original parameters were called tab (tabula or location), dez (designator or handshape), and sig (signation or movement). Stokoe did not originally include palm orientation as a "chereme" but his notation system did include a way to represent orientation. The current parameters are: handshape, movement, location, palm orientation, and non-manual signals and are analogous to the articulators, place of articulation, and manner of articulation studied in spoken language linguistics.

=== Handshape ===
Handshapes may be grouped into two categories: marked, and unmarked. Unmarked handshapes are easier, more basic shapes, while marked handshapes are more challenging and complex. The following handshapes are the most unmarked handshapes in ASL: closed fist ("S" or "A" hand), flat palm ("B" hand), flat palm with spread fingers ("5" hand), rounded hand with fingertips and thumb touching ("O" hand), closed fist with index finger extended ("G" or "1" hand), and rounded hand with fingertips not touching ("C" hand).

Unmarked handshapes
"S" (or "A") hand	"B" hand
"5" hand	"O" hand
"G" (or "1") hand	"C" hand

The following handshapes are the most marked handshapes in ASL: bent index finger ("X" hand), index and middle finger twisted together ("R" hand), thumb poking through closed fist ("T" hand), fingertips resting on thumb ("E" hand), thumb and ring finger touching ("7" hand), thumb and middle finger touching ("8" hand).

Marked handshapes
"X" hand	"R" hand
"T" hand	"E" hand
"7" hand	"8" hand

Most phonological research historically focused on the handshape. A problem in most studies of handshape is the fact that often elements of a manual alphabet are borrowed into signs, although not all of these elements are part of the sign language's phoneme inventory. Also, allophones are sometimes considered separate phonemes. The first inventory of ASL handshapes contained 19 phonemes (or cheremes).

=== Movement ===
In some phonological models, movement is a phonological prime. Other models consider movement as redundant, as it is predictable from the locations, hand orientations and handshape features at the start and end of a sign. Models in which movement is a prime usually distinguish path movement (i.e. movement of the hand[s] through space) and internal movement (i.e. an opening or closing movement of the hand, a hand rotation, or finger wiggling).

=== Non-manual signals ===
Non-manual signals may include movement of the eyebrows, the cheeks, the nose, the head, the torso, and the eyes. Sign phonemes are often compared to spoken language phonemes but sign language phonemes are different from spoken language phonemes in that they occur simultaneously (are coarticulated), like suprasegmental elements in speech.

== Allophony and minimal pairs ==
The top most hand is the ASL sign for the letter /b/ with the different realizations of the same phoneme below it. The bottom left hand shows the fingers bent at the bottom joints and the bottom right hand shows the thumb being along the side of the hand.

Each phoneme may have multiple allophones, i.e. different realizations of the same phoneme. For example, in the /B/ handshape, the bending of the selected fingers may vary from straight to bent at the lowest joint, and the position of the thumb may vary from stretched at the side of the hand to fold in the palm of the hand. Differences in phonemes may be free variation, but is also often conditioned by the context of the phoneme. Thus, the /B/ handshape will be flexed in a sign in which the fingertips touch the body, and the thumb will be folded in the palm in signs where the radial side of the hand touches the body or the other hand.

Minimal pairs in ASL occur when only one phoneme (e.g. location in the signs MOTHER and FATHER) differs between two signs, just as minimal pairs in spoken languages differ by one phoneme (e.g. cat and mat).

The following table shows some minimal pairs in ASL and indicates which phoneme differs. These examples were taken from Battison 1974 but the glosses were changed to align with those of ASL Signbank.

Sign 1	Sign 2	Parameter that differs
APPLE	ONION	location
CAR	WHICH	handshape
PROPOSE	MAYBE	movement
TEMPORARY	TRAIN	orientation

== Phonological rules and phonotactics ==
As mentioned above, research into ASL phonotactic constraints (and those in other signed languages) is ongoing. The Symmetry and Dominance Conditions are phonological rules in ASL. The Symmetry Condition requires both hands in a symmetric two-handed sign to have the same or a mirrored configuration, orientation, and movement. The Dominance Condition requires that only one hand in a two-handed sign moves if the hands do not have the same handshape specifications, and that the non-dominant hand has an unmarked handshape. These conditions may be found to apply in other signed languages as cross-linguistic research increases, and may not apply only to ASL phonology.

Six types of signs have been suggested: one-handed signs made without contact, one-handed signs made with contact (excluding on the other hand), symmetric two-handed signs (i.e. signs in which both hands are active and perform the same action), asymmetric two-handed signs (i.e. signs in which one hand is active and one hand is passive) where both hands have the same handshape, asymmetric two-handed signs where the hands have differing handshapes, and compound signs (that combine two or more of the above types). The non-dominant hand in asymmetric signs often functions as the location of the sign. Monosyllabic signs are the most common type of signs in ASL and other sign languages.

=== Assimilation ===
Assimilation of sign phonemes, to signs in the context, is a common process in ASL. For example, the point of contact for signs like THINK, normally at the forehead, may be articulated at a lower location if the location in the following sign is below the cheek. Other assimilation processes concern the number of selected fingers in a sign, that may adapt to that of the previous or following sign. Also, it has been observed that one-handed signs are articulated with two hands when followed by two-handed signs.

== Phonological processing in the brain ==
The brain processes language phonologically by first identifying the smallest units in an utterance, then combining them to make meaning. In spoken language, these smallest units are often referred to as phonemes, and they are the smallest sounds we identify in a spoken word. In sign language, the smallest units are often referred to as the parameters of a sign (i.e. handshape, location, movement and palm orientation), and we can identify these smallest parts within a produced sign. The cognitive method of phonological processing can be described as segmentation and categorization, where the brain recognizes the individual parts within the sign and combines them to form meaning. This is similar to how spoken language combines sounds to form syllables and then words. Even though the modalities of these languages differ (spoken vs. signed), the brain still processes them similarly through segmentation and categorization.

Measuring brain activity while a person produces or perceives sign language reveals that the brain processes signs differently compared to regular hand movements. This is similar to how the brain differentiates between spoken words and semantically lacking sounds. More specifically, the brain is able to differentiate actual signs from the transition movements in between signs, similarly to how words in spoken language can be identified separately from sounds or breaths that occur in between words that don't contain linguistic meaning. Multiple studies have revealed enhanced brain activity while processing sign language compared to processing only hand movements. For example, during a brain surgery performed on a deaf patient who was still awake, their neural activity was observed and analyzed while they were shown videos in American Sign Language. The results showed that greater brain activity occurred during the moments when the person was perceiving actual signs as compared to the moments that occurred during transition into the next sign This means the brain is segmenting the units of the sign and identifying which units combine to form actual meaning.

An observed difference in location for phonological processing between spoken language and sign language is the activation of areas of the brain specific to auditory vs. visual stimuli. Because of the modality differences, the cortical regions will be stimulated differently depending on which type of language it is. Spoken language creates sounds, which affects the auditory cortices in the superior temporal lobes. Sign language creates visual stimuli, which affects the occipitotemporal regions. Yet both modes of language still activate many of the same regions that are known for language processing in the brain. For example, the left superior temporal gyrus is stimulated by language in both spoken and signed forms, even though it was once assumed it was only affected by auditory stimuli. No matter the mode of language being used, whether it be spoken or signed, the brain processes language by segmenting the smallest phonological units and combining them to make meaning.

== Bibliography ==
- Battison, R. (1978) Lexical Borrowing in American Sign Language. Silver Spring, MD: Linstok Press.
- Brentari, D. (1998) A Prosodic Model of Sign Language Phonology. Cambridge, MA: MIT Press.
- Hulst, Harry van der. 1993. Units in the analysis of signs. Phonology 10, 209–241.
- Liddell, Scott K. & Robert E. Johnson. 1989. American Sign Language: The phonological base. Sign Language Studies 64. 197–277.
- Perlmutter, D. 1992. Sonority and syllable structure in American Sign Language. Linguistic Inquiry 23, 407–442.
- Sandler, W.(1989) Phonological representation of the sign: linearity and nonlinearity in American Sign Language. Dordrecht: Foris.
- Stokoe, W. (1960) Sign language structure. An outline of the visual communication systems of the American Deaf. (1993 Reprint ed.). Silver Spring, MD: Linstok Press.
- Van der Kooij, E.(2002). Phonological Categories in Sign Language of the Netherlands. The Role of Phonetic Implementation and Iconicity. PhD Thesis, Universiteit Leiden, Leiden.
