= Languages of Canada =

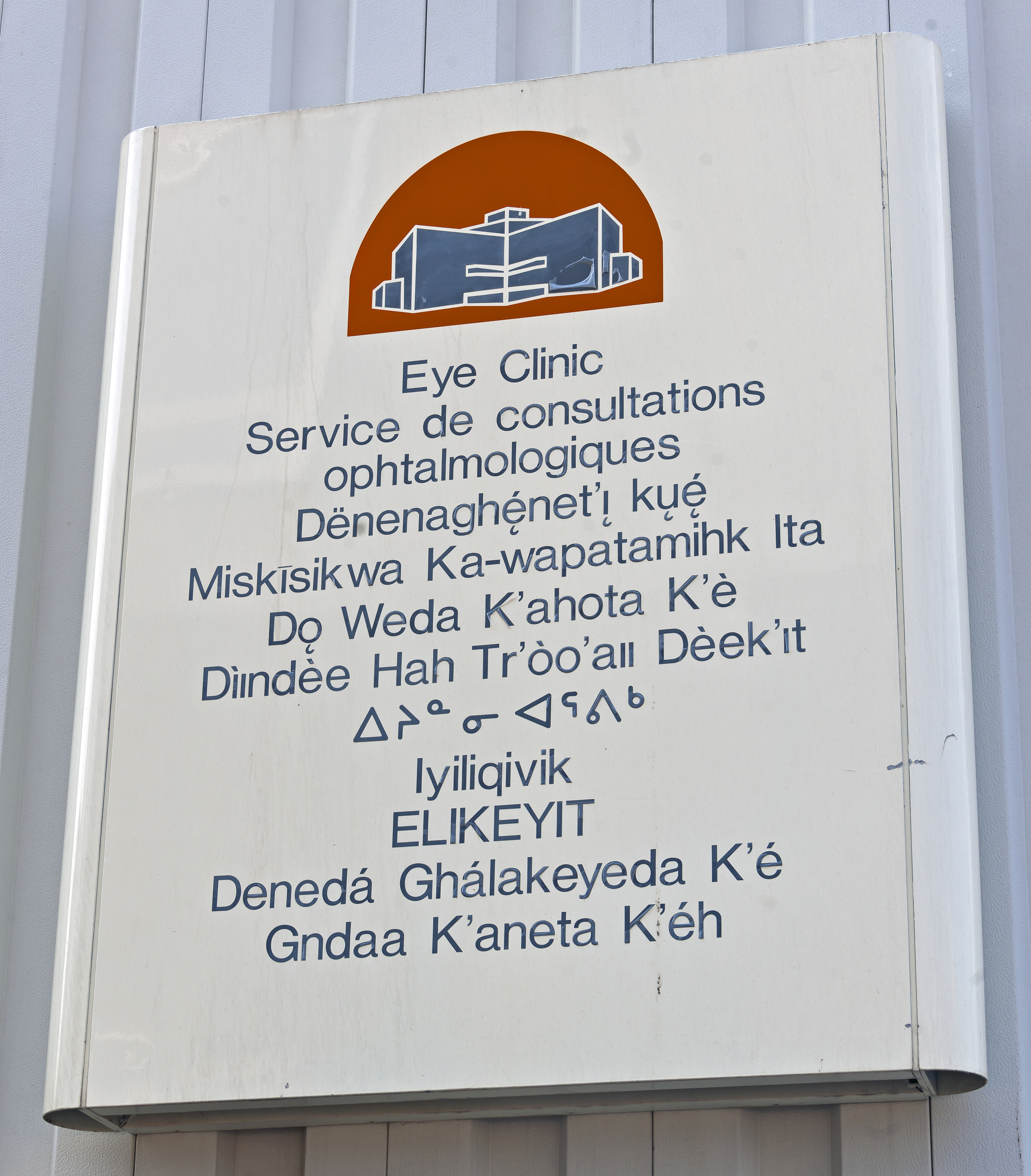
- Sign in Yellowknife featuring English, French, and indigenous languages
- Official: English and French (federal)
- Semi-official: Northwest Territories: Dene Kǝdǝ́, Dëne Sųłıné, Dene Zhatıé, Dinjii Zhuʼ Ginjik, Inuinnaqtun, Inuktitut, Inuvialuktun, nēhiyawēwin, Tłı̨chǫ; Nova Scotia: Mi'kmawi'simk (Note: First Language of Nova Scotia); Nunavut: Inuktut (Inuinnaqtun, Inuktitut)
- Indigenous: (by language family) Algic (22), Inuit (13), Iroquoian (7) Na-Dene (24), Plains Sign (2), Plateau Sign (2), Salishan (17), Siouan (3), Tsimshian (4), Wakashan (6), Isolates (3: Haida, Inuit Sign Language, Ktunaxa)
- Regional: Deitsch; Gaelic; Hutterisch; Irish; Plautdietsch; Russian; Ukrainian
- Vernacular: Canadian English, Canadian French, Bungi, Chinook Jargon
- Minority: Mandarin; Cantonese; Punjabi; Spanish; Arabic; Tagalog (Filipino); German; Italian; Tamil; Portuguese
- Signed: Signed English, Signed French; American Sign Language (ASL); Black ASL; Quebec SL (LSQ); Hand Talk; Oneida SL; Plateau SL; Inuit SL (IUR); Maritime SL (MSL)
- Keyboard layout: QWERTY; US English Canadian French Canadian Multilingual Standard (rare) Inuktitut Naqittaut

A multitude of languages have always been spoken in Canada. Prior to Confederation, the territories that would become Canada were home to over 70 distinct languages across 12 or so language families. Today, a majority of those indigenous languages are still spoken; however, most are endangered and only about 0.6% of the Canadian population report an indigenous language as their mother tongue. (Note: 200,725 Canadians, or less than one per cent of the population, report an Aboriginal language as their mother tongue.) Since the establishment of the Canadian state, English and French have been the co-official languages and are, by far, the most-spoken languages in the country.

According to the 2021 census, English and French are the mother tongues of 56.6% and 20.2% of Canadians respectively. The 2016 census shows that a total of 86.2% of Canadians could conduct a conversation in English, while 29.8% could conduct a conversation in French. Legally, both languages have equal status in respect of federal government services and most courts. Provincially, New Brunswick is the sole entirely bilingual province. French is Quebec's official language, and English is the official language of Manitoba and Alberta. The government of Ontario's website states English is that province's official language, while the French Language Services Act states that, additionally, French is official in the courts and in the provincial education sector. The remaining provinces, while do not have an official provincial language, per se use primarily English. Territorially, both the Northwest Territories and Nunavut have official indigenous languages alongside French and English.

Canada's official languages commissioner (the federal government official charged with monitoring the two languages) said in 2009, "[I]n the same way that race is at the core of what it means to be American and at the core of an American experience and class is at the core of British experience, I think that language is at the core of Canadian experience." To assist in more accurately monitoring the two official languages, Canada's census collects a number of demolinguistic descriptors not enumerated in the censuses of most other countries, including home language, mother tongue, first official language, and language of work.

Canada is linguistically diverse, with 20% of its population speaking a language other than English or French at home. This includes approximately 6.4 million people speaking immigrant languages, over 213,000 speaking Indigenous languages, and nearly 25,000 using sign languages. (Note: Nearly 148,000 people reported speaking both a language other than English or French most often and a second language other than English or French on a regular basis at home. The term "immigrant languages" refers to languages (other than English, French and Aboriginal languages) whose presence in Canada is originally due to immigration. The document entitled Aboriginal languages in Canada, Catalogue no. 98‑314‑X2011003, in the Census in Brief series, provides more detailed information on this subject.)

== Official languages ==
=== Legal status ===
Under the Official Languages Act of 1969, both English and French have official status throughout Canada in respect of federal government services and most courts. All federal legislation is enacted bilingually. Provincially, only in New Brunswick are both English and French official to the same extent. French is Quebec's official language, although legislation is enacted in both French and English and court proceedings may be conducted in either language. English is the official language of Ontario, Manitoba and Alberta, but government services are available in French in many regions of each, particularly in regions and cities where Francophones form the majority. Legislation is enacted in both languages and courts conduct cases in both. In 2022, Nova Scotia recognized Mi'kmawi'simk as the first language of the province, and maintains two provincial language secretariats: the Office of Acadian Affairs and Francophonie (French language) and the Office of Gaelic Affairs (Canadian Gaelic). The remaining provinces (British Columbia, Saskatchewan, Prince Edward Island, and Newfoundland and Labrador) do not have an official provincial language per se but government is primarily English-speaking. Territorially, both the Northwest Territories and Nunavut have official indigenous languages alongside French and English: Inuktut (Inuktitut and Inuinnaqtun) in Nunavut and, in the NWT, nine others. (Note: Dene Kǝdǝ́, Dëne Sųłıné, Dene Zhatıé, Dinjii Zhuʼ Ginjik, Inuinnaqtun, Inuktitut, Inuvialuktun, nēhiyawēwin, Tłı̨chǫ.)

=== Home language: rates of language use 1971–2011 ===
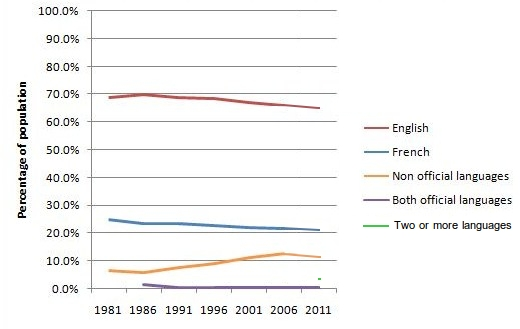
Languages – Statistics Canada

The percentage of the population speaking English, French or both languages most often at home has declined since 1986; the decline has been greatest for French. The proportion of the population who speak neither English nor French in the home has increased. Geographically, this trend remains constant, as usage of English and French have declined in both English and French speaking regions of the country, but French has declined more rapidly both inside and outside Quebec. The table below shows the percentage of the total Canadian population who speak Canada's official languages most often at home from 1971 to 2006. Note that there are nuances between "language most spoken at home", "mother-language" and "first official language": data is collected for all three, which together provide a more detailed and complete picture of language-use in Canada.

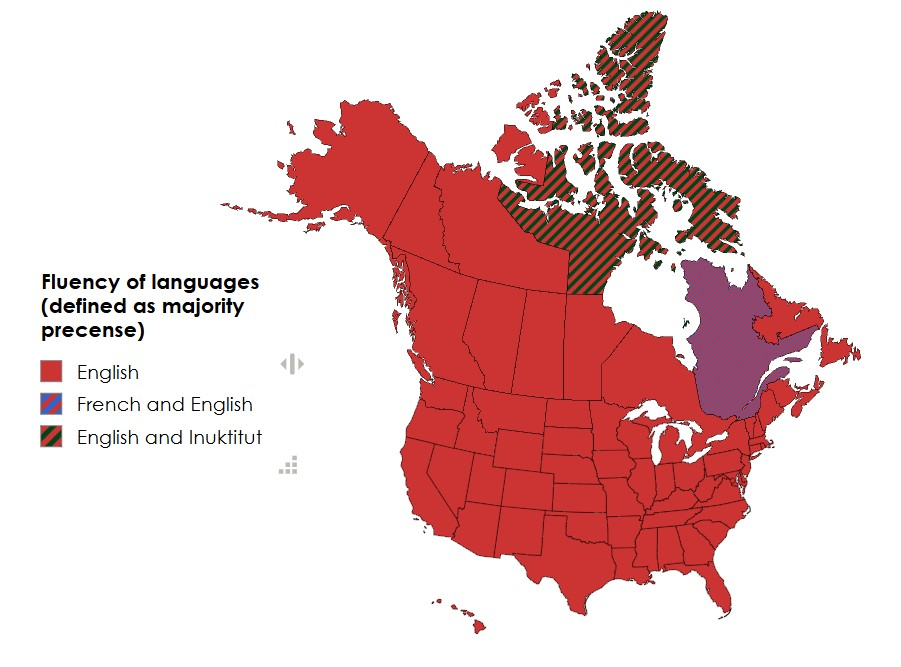
Map showing fluency of languages in Northern America

=== Use of English ===
In 2011, just under 21.5 million Canadians, representing 65% of the population, spoke English most of the time at home, while 58% declared it their mother language. English is the major language everywhere in Canada except Quebec and Nunavut, and most Canadians (85%) can speak English. While English is not the preferred language in Quebec, 51.7% of Québécois can speak English; a dramatic increase from 36.1% in 2016. Nationally, Francophones are five times more likely to speak English than Anglophones are to speak French – 44% and 9% respectively. Only 3.2% of Canada's English-speaking population resides in Quebec—mostly in Montreal. (Note: 18,858,908 Canadians identify their mother tongue as English. 599,230 Québécois identify their mother tongue as English and of that 309,885 live in Montreal.)

In 2011, 28.4 million Canadians had knowledge of English while only 21.6 million Canadians spoke it most often at home.

=== Use of French ===
In 2011, just over 7.1 million Canadians spoke French most often at home, this was a rise of 4.2%, although the proportion of people in Canada who spoke French "most often" at home fell slightly from 21.7% to 21.5% . Of these, about 6.1 million or 85% resided in Quebec. Outside Quebec, the largest French-speaking populations are found in New Brunswick (which is home to 3.1% of Canada's Francophones) and Ontario (4.2%, residing primarily in the eastern and northeastern parts of the province and in Toronto and Ottawa). Overall, 22% of people in Canada declare French to be their mother language, while one in three Canadians speak French and 70% are unilingual Anglophones. (Note: Of the 33,121,175 Canadians only 9,960,590 report to having knowledge of the French language.) Smaller indigenous French-speaking communities exist in some other provinces. For example, a vestigial community exists on Newfoundland's Port au Port Peninsula, a remnant of the "French Shore" along the island's west coast.

The percentage of the population who speak French both by mother tongue and home language has decreased over the past three decades. Whereas the number of those who speak English at home is higher than the number of people whose mother tongue is English, the opposite is true for Francophones. There are fewer people who speak French at home, than learned French after birth.

Ethnic diversity is growing in French Canada but still lags behind the English-speaking parts of the country. In 2006, 91.5% of Quebecers considered themselves to be of either "French" or "Canadian" origin. As a result of the growth in immigration, since the 1970s, from countries in which French is a widely used language, 3.4% of Quebecers indicated that they were of Haitian, Belgian, Swiss, Lebanese or Moroccan origin. Other groups of non-francophone immigrants (Irish Catholics, Italian, Portuguese, etc.) have also assimilated into French over the generations. The Irish, who started arriving in large numbers in Quebec in the 1830s, were the first such group, which explains why it has been possible for Quebec to have had five premiers of Irish ethnic origin: John Jones Ross (1884–87), Edmund James Flynn (1896–97), Daniel Johnson Sr. (1966–68), Pierre-Marc Johnson (1985), and Daniel Johnson Jr. (1994).

In 1991, due to linguistic assimilation of Francophones outside Quebec, over one million Canadians who claimed English as their mother tongue were of French ethnic origin (1991 Census).

=== Bilingualism and multilingualism versus English–French bilingualism ===
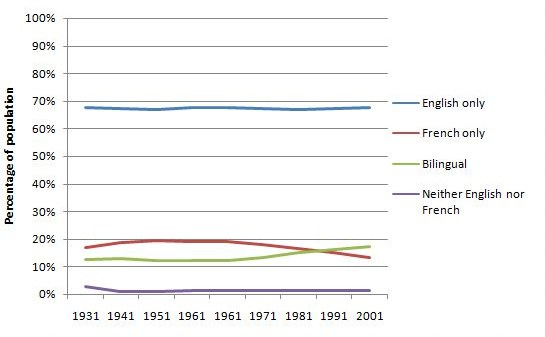
Ability of Canadians to speak English and French 1931–2001

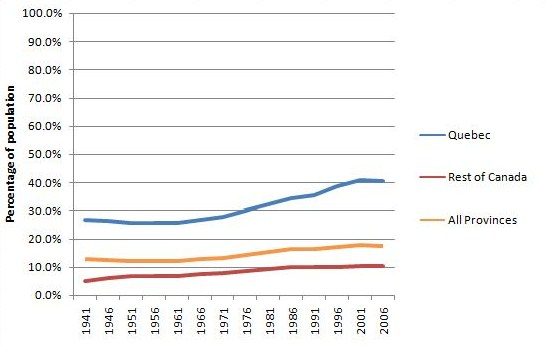
Rate of bilingualism (French and English) in Quebec and the rest of Canada, 1941–2006

According to the 2011 census, 98.2% of Canadian residents have knowledge of one or both of the country's two official languages. Between 2006 and 2011, the number of persons who reported being able to conduct a conversation in both of Canada's official languages increased by nearly 350,000 to 5.8 million. The bilingualism rate of the Canadian population edged up from 17.4% in 2006 to 17.5% in 2011. This growth of English-French bilingualism in Canada was mainly due to the increased number of Quebecers who reported being able to conduct a conversation in English and French.

Bilingualism with regard to nonofficial languages also increased, most individuals speaking English plus an immigrant language such as Punjabi or Mandarin.

Proportion of bilingual Canadians in Quebec and the rest of Canada compared to overall population distribution 1941–2016
Year	# Bilingual Canadians	% Quebec	% Rest of Canada	Total # Canadians	% Quebec	% Rest of Canada
1941	1,472,858	59.9%	39.5%	11,506,700	29.0%	71.0%
1951	1,727,400	60.1%	39.9%	14,009,400	28.9%	71.1%
1961	2,231,200	60.0%	40.0%	18,238,200	28.8%	71.2%
1971	2,900,150	57.4%	42.6%	21,568,310	27.9%	72.1%
1981	3,681,955	56.1%	43.9%	24,083,495	26.4%	73.6%
1986	4,056,155	54.9%	45.1%	25,022,005	25.8%	74.2%
1991	4,398,655	54.9%	45.1%	26,994,045	25.2%	74.8%
1996	4,841,320	55.0%	45.0%	28,528,120	24.2%	75.8%
2001	5,231,575	55.6%	44.0%	29,639,030	24.0%	76.0%
2006	5,448,850	55.4%	44.6%	31,241,030	23.8%	76.2%
2016	6,251,485	57.9%	42.1%	34,767,255	23.2%	76.8%

According to the 2021 census, 94.3% of Quebecers have knowledge of French, and 51.7% have knowledge of English. Bilingualism (of the two official languages) is largely limited to Quebec itself, and to a strip of territory sometimes referred to as the "bilingual belt", that stretches east from Quebec into northern New Brunswick and west into parts of Ottawa and northeastern Ontario. 85% of bilingual Canadians live within Quebec, Ontario and New Brunswick. A majority of all bilingual Canadians, (57.4%) are themselves Quebecers, and a high percentage of the bilingual population in the rest of Canada resides in close proximity to the Quebec border.

Similarly, the rate of bilingualism in Quebec has risen higher, and more quickly than in the rest of Canada. In Quebec, the rate of bilingualism has increased from 26% of the population being able to speak English and French in 1951 to 42.5% in 2011. As of 2011, in the rest of Canada (excluding Quebec) the rate of bilingualism was 7.5%.

Percentage of French-English bilingualism by province/territory (2016 census)
Province/territory	% of population	Total number	Ref.
Quebec	44.5%	3,586,410	
New Brunswick	34%	249,950	
Northwest Territories	14%	4,900	
Prince Edward Island	13%	17,840	
Ontario	11.2%	1,490,390	
Nova Scotia	10.5%	95,380	
Yukon	10.3%	4,275	
Manitoba	9%	108,460	
Alberta	7%	264,720	
British Columbia	7%	314,925	
Saskatchewan	5%	51,560	
Newfoundland and Labrador	5%	25,940	
Nunavut	4.3%	1,525	
Canada—Total	17.9%	6,216,065	

==== English–French bilingualism rates ====
English–French bilingualism is highest among members of local linguistic minorities. It is very uncommon for Canadians to be capable of speaking only the minority official language of their region (French outside Quebec or English in Quebec). Only 1.5% of Canadians are able to speak only the minority official language, and of these most (90%) live in the bilingual belt.

As the table below shows, rates of bilingualism are much higher among individuals who belong to the linguistic minority group for their region of Canada, than among members of the local linguistic majority. For example, within Quebec around 37% of bilingual Canadians are Francophones, whereas Francophones only represent 4.5% of the population outside Quebec.

Rates of French-English bilingualism among linguistic groups.
	Anglophones	Francophones	Allophones
Quebec	66.1%	36.6%	50.4%
Rest of Canada	7.1%	85.1%	5.7%

=== Official language minority communities ===
French-speaking Canadians from outside Quebec and English-speaking Quebecers are, together, the official language minority communities. These communities are:

Official language minority communities
Jurisdiction	Community
Quebec	Anglo-Quebecers
Ontario	Franco-Ontarians / Ontarois
Manitoba	Franco-Manitobans
Saskatchewan	Fransaskois
Alberta	Franco-Albertans
British Columbia	Franco-Colombians
Yukon	Franco-Yukonnais
Northwest Territories	Franco-Ténois
Nunavut	Franco-Nunavois
Newfoundland and Labrador	Franco-Terreneuviens
New Brunswick; Prince Edward Island; Nova Scotia	Acadiens
New Brunswick	Brayons
Manitoba; Alberta; British Columbia; Northwest Territories; Ontario; Saskatchewan	Métis

==== French outside Quebec ====
The language continuity index represents the relationship between the number of people who speak French most often at home and the number for whom French is their mother tongue. A continuity index of less than one indicates that French has more losses than gains – that more people with French as a mother tongue speak another language at home. Outside Quebec, New Brunswick has the highest French language continuity ratio. British Columbia and Saskatchewan have the lowest French language continuity ratio and thus the lowest retention of French. From 1971 to 2011, the overall ratio for French language continuity outside Quebec declined from 0.73 to 0.45. Declines were the greatest for Manitoba, Saskatchewan, and Newfoundland.

French language continuity ratio 1971–2011
Province/Territory	1971	1981	1991	1996	2001	2006	2011	2021
New Brunswick	0.92	0.93	0.93	0.92	0.91	0.91	0.89	0.89
Quebec	-	-	1.01	1.01	1.02	1.03	1.03	1.03
Nunavut	-	-	-	-	0.54	0.57	0.58	0.65
Canada	-	-	0.96	0.96	0.96	0.97	0.97	0.98
Ontario	0.73	0.72	0.63	0.61	0.60	0.60	0.57	0.55
Nova Scotia	0.69	0.69	0.59	0.57	0.56	0.53	0.51	0.46
Prince Edward Island	0.60	0.64	0.53	0.53	0.48	0.49	0.47	0.45
Manitoba	0.65	0.60	0.49	0.47	0.46	0.45	0.42	0.40
Yukon	0.30	0.45	0.43	0.46	0.46	0.49	0.57	0.58
Northwest Territories	0.50	0.51	0.47	0.43	0.39	0.46	0.51	0.54
Newfoundland and Labrador	0.63	0.72	0.47	0.42	0.42	0.36	0.46	0.39
Alberta	0.49	0.49	0.36	0.32	0.33	0.33	0.36	0.35
Saskatchewan	0.50	0.41	0.33	0.29	0.26	0.26	0.26	0.25
British Columbia	0.30	0.35	0.28	0.29	0.29	0.30	0.29	0.30

== Non-official languages used in Canada ==
=== Indigenous languages ===
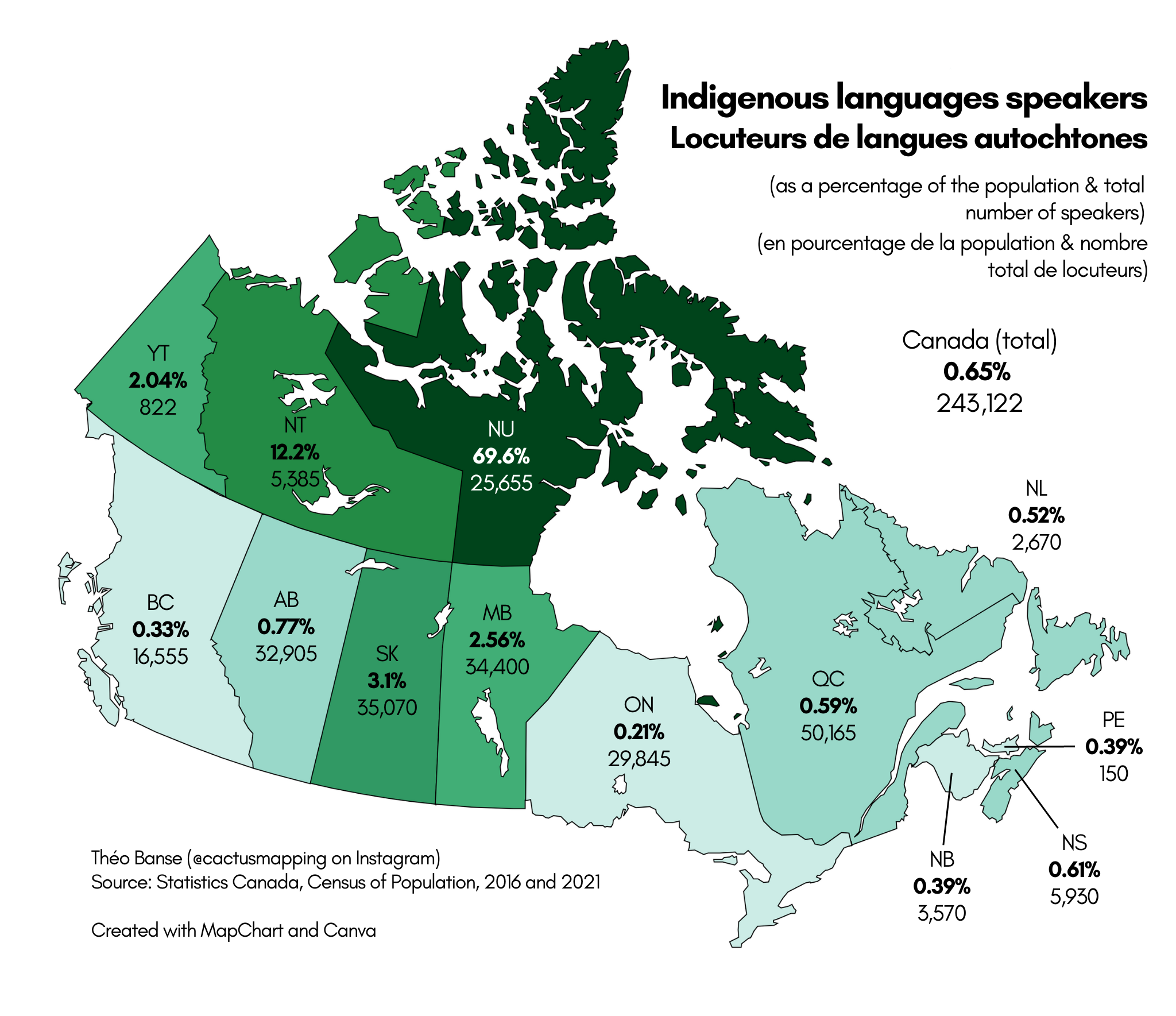
Indigenous language speakers in Canada-3

Canada is home to a rich variety of indigenous languages, most of which are spoken nowhere else. There are 14 indigenous language groups in Canada with about 100 distinct languages and dialects, including many sign languages. Almost all indigenous languages in Canada are considered endangered, with the exception of Inuktitut, Inuinnaqtun, and the Cree varieties Naskapi, Atikamekw, East Cree, and Plains Cree. Prior to colonization, multilingualism was common across indigenous nations, many of whom often seasonally migrated. However, the reserve system created more permanent stationary bands, which have generally selected only one of their various ancestral languages to try to preserve in the face of increasing Anglicization, Francization, or Amslanization (the process by which American Sign Language replaces local sign languages). In addition, the residential school system attempted to institutionally exterminate languages and cultures from coast to coast to coast. The cruel methods (such as physical and sexual abuse, as well as death rates as high as one in twenty children) resulted in a sharp declines in language use across all nations, including amongst deaf and signing communities.

Robert Falcon Ouellette, a Cree Member of Parliament, played a pivotal role in promoting indigenous languages within the Canadian Parliament and Canadian House of Commons. He was instrumental in obtaining unanimous consent from all political parties to change the standing orders to allow indigenous languages to be spoken in the House of Commons, with full translation services provided. This historic change enabled Ouellette to deliver a speech in Cree, marking the first use of an indigenous language in the House on 28 January 2019.

Maps of Inuit oral languages.

Map of Greenlandic and Inuit Sign Languages.

Furthermore, Bill C-91, the Indigenous Languages Act passed in 2019, was enacted to support and revitalize indigenous languages across Canada. This legislation, aims to reclaim, revitalize, and maintain indigenous languages through sustainable funding and the establishment of the Office of the Commissioner of Indigenous Languages. Ouellette was the chair of the indigenous caucus in the House of Commons and helped ensure it passage before the election of 2019.

Two of Canada's territories give official status to native languages. In Nunavut, Inuktitut and Inuinnaqtun, known collectively as Inuktut, are official languages alongside the national languages of English and French, and Inuktitut is a common vehicular language in territorial government. In the Northwest Territories, the Official Languages Act declares that there are eleven different languages: Cree, Dënësųłıné, Dene Yatıé / Dene Zhatıé, (Note: Also known as the "Slavey language(s)," these languages are grouped into the North (Sahtúgot’įné Yatı̨́ spoken by the Sahtu Dene, the Hare Dene dialect of K’ashógot’įne Goxedǝ́, and the northern mountain dialect of Shíhgot’įne Yatı̨́) and South (Dene Yatıé or Dene Zhatıé, and Dené Dháh used predominately by the Dene Tha' in Alberta). There is a sizeable push to end of the use of the name Slave or Slavey in relation to these Dene nations.) English, French, Gwich’in, Inuinnaqtun, Inuktitut, Inuvialuktun, Sahtúgot’įné Yatı̨́ / K’ashógot’įne Goxedǝ́ / Shíhgot’įne Yatı̨́, and Tłįchǫ. Besides English and French, these languages are not vehicular in government; official status entitles citizens to receive services in them on request and to deal with the government in them.

Awaiting royal assent in October 2022 on Treaty Day, Nova Scotia has affirmed Mi'kmawi'simk as the "First Language" of the province through a bill titled the "Mi'kmaw Language Act" (No. 148). The Act establishes a language committee co-developed and co-run by Miꞌkmaw Kinaꞌmatnewey as well as ensuring "government support for the preservation, revitalization, promotion and protection of the Mi’kmaw language for generations to come," collaboratively developing strategy between the Mi'kmaq of Nova Scotia and the Government of Nova Scotia.

According to the 2016 census, less than one per cent of Canadians (213,225) reported an indigenous language as their mother tongue, and less than one per cent of Canadians (137,515) reported an indigenous language as the language spoken most often at home. Whilst most Canadian indigenous languages are endangered and their current speaker numbers are frequently low, the number of speakers has grown and even outpaced the number with an indigenous mother tongue, indicating that many people continue to learn the languages even if not initially raised with them.

Given the destruction of indigenous state structures, academics usually classify indigenous peoples of Canada by region into "culture areas", or by their language family.

- Arctic cultural area (Inuit languages, including Inuit Sign Language)
- Subarctic culture area (Na-Dene and Algonquian languages)
- Eastern Woodlands (Northeast) cultural area (Algonquian and Iroquoian languages)
- Plains cultural area (Algonquian, Plains Sign, and Siouan languages)
- Northwest Plateau cultural area (Ktunaxa, Na-Dene, and Salishan languages, including Secwepemcékst and Plateau Sign Language)
- Northwest Coast cultural area (Haida, Salishan, Tsimshianic, and Wakashan languages, possibly including Coast Salish Sign Language)

Indigenous languages	No. of speakers	Mother tongue	Home language
Cree (n.o.s.) (Note: n.o.s. – not otherwise specified)^{[a]}	99,950	78,855	47,190
Inuktitut	35,690	32,010	25,290
Ojibwemowin	32,460	11,115	11,115
Innu–Naskapi	11,815	10,970	9,720
Denesuline	11,130	9,750	7,490
Oji-Cree (Anishininimowin)	12,605	8,480	8,480
Mi'kmawi'simk	8,750	7,365	3,985
Siouan languages (Dakota/Nakota)	6,495	5,585	3,780
Atikamekw	5,645	5,245	4,745
Blackfoot	4,915	3,085	3,085
Tłįchǫ	2,645	2,015	1,110
Algonquin (Omàmìwininìmowin)	2,685	1,920	385
Dakelh	2,495	1,560	605
Gitxsanimaax	1,575	1,175	320
Tsilhqot'in	1,400	1,070	435
Sahtúgot’įné Yatı̨́ / K’ashógot’įne Goxedǝ́ / Shíhgot’įne Yatı̨́	1,235	650	650
Dené Dháh / Dene Yatıé / Dene Zhatıé	2,315	600	600
Wəlastəkey latowewakən	790	535	140
Inuinnaqtun	580	370	70
Gwich’in	570	355	25
Kanienʼkéha	615	290	20
Secwepemctsín	1,650	250	250
Nisg̱a'a	1,090	250	250
Tlingit	175	0	0
Atgangmuurngniq	47	0	0

Source: Statistics Canada, 2006 Census Profile of Federal Electoral Districts (2003 Representation Order): Language, Mobility and Migration and Immigration and Citizenship Ottawa, 2007, pp. 2, 6, 10.
^{a} There exist numerous Cree languages, such as Plains Cree (nêhiyawêwin ᓀᐦᐃᔭᐍᐏᐣ), Woods Cree (nīhithawīwin ᓃᐦᐃᖬᐑᐏᐣ), Swampy Cree (E: nêhinawêwin ᓀᐦᐃᓇᐌᐎᐣ, W: ininîmowin ᐃᓂᓃᒧᐎᓐ), Moose Cree (ililîmowin ᐃᓕᓖᒧᐎᓐ), and East Cree (N: Iyiniu-Ayamiwin ᐄᓅ ᐊᔨᒨᓐ S: Iyiyiu-Ayamiwin ᐄᔨᔫ ᐊᔨᒨᓐ).
^{b} Although small in number, these languages have been included without data to show the disparity in information between oral and sign languages. The Canadian Association of the Deaf state that, in their opinion, "no fully credible census of Deaf, deafened, and hard of hearing people has ever been conducted in Canada." By extension, there exists no credible data on sign languages, especially of indigenous sign languages.

Glottolog 4.3 (2020) counted 13 independent indigenous language families and/or isolates in Canada. A potential fourteenth family, that of the sign languages of the Plateau, possibly hosting languages like Secwepemcékst and Ktunaxa Sign Language, remains unlisted by Glottolog. It remains unknown to academia the extent which sign languages are spoken and how they relate to and across linguistic families.

1. Algonquian (Note: Algic languages: Anishininiimowin ᐊᓂᐦᔑᓂᓃᒧᐏᐣ; Atikamekw nehirâmowin; Daawaamwin; ililîmowin ᐃᓕᓖᒧᐎᓐ; ininîmowin ᐃᓂᓃᒧᐎᓐ; Innu- / Ilnu-Aimûn; Iiyiyiu- / Iiyiyuu- / Iinuu-Ayamiwin ᐄᔨᔨᐤ- / ᐄᔨᔫ- / ᐄᓅ-ᐊᔨᒨᓐ; Mi'kmawi'simk; Mitchif; Nakawēmowin ᓇᐦᑲᐌᒧᐎᓐ; Naskapi Iyimuun ᓇᔅᑲᐱ ᐃᔨᒧᐅᓐ; nêhinawêwin ᓀᐦᐃᓇᐌᐎᐣ; nêhiyawêwin ᓀᐦᐃᔭᐍᐏᐣ; nīhithawīwin ᓃᐦᐃᖬᐑᐏᐣ; Niitsipowahsin ᖹᐨᓱᑲᖷᑊᓱᐡ; Ojibwemowin ᐅᒋᑉᐧᐁᒧᐎᓐ; Omàmìwininìmowin; Wəlastəkey latowewakən; Wôbanakiôdwawôgan; ʔɔʔɔ́ɔ́ɔ́naakíitʔɔh)
2. Haida
3. Inuit (Note: Inuit languages: Aivilingmiutut; Iglulingmiutut ᐃᒡᓗᓕᖕᒥᐅᑐᑦ; Inuinnaqtun; Inuktitut ᐃᓄᒃᑎᑐᑦ; Inuttitut; Inuvialuktun; Kangiryuarmiutun; Kivallirmiutut ᑭᕙᓪᓕᕐᒥᐅᑐᑦ; Natsilingmiutut ᓇᑦᓯᓕᖕᒥᐅᑐᑦ; Siglitun; Utkuhiksalingmiutitut; Uummarmiutun)
4. Inuit Sign
5. Iroquoian (Note: Iroquoian languages: Gayogo̱hó:nǫʼ; Kanienʼkéha; Onǫdaʼgegáʼ; Onödowáʼga:ʼ; Onʌyotaʔa:ka; Ska:rù:ręʼ; Wendat)
6. Ktunaxa
7. Na-Dene (Note: Na-Dene languages: Dakelh ᑕᗸᒡ; Dän kʼè / Dän kʼí; Dane-zaa Ẕáágéʔ; Dené Dháh / Dene Yatıé / Dene Zhatıé; Dënë Sųłınë́ Yatıé; Gwich'in; Häł gołan; Kaska Dene Zágéʼ; Lingít; Nedut'en; Sahtúgot’įné Yatı̨́ K’ashógot’įne Goxedǝ́ Shíhgot’įne Yatı̨́; Tā̀gish; Tałtan ẕāke; Tłı̨chǫ Yatıì; Tse'khene; Tŝilhqot’in; Tsúùtʼínà; Witsuwitʼen)
8. Plains Sign (Note: Plains Sign languages: Prairie Hand Talk; Onʌyota'a:ká Sign Language)
9. Salishan (Note: Salishan languages: Éy7á7juuthem; Halq̓eméylem Hul̓q̓umín̓um̓ hən̓q̓əmin̓əm̓; Lək̓ʷəŋən; Nłeʔkepmxcín; n̓səl̓xcin̓; Nuxalk; Secwepemctsín; SENĆOŦEN; Sháshíshálh; Sḵwx̱wú7mesh sníchim; sn-səlxcin; St̓át̓imcets / Sƛ̓aƛ̓imxǝc / Lil̓wat7úlmec / Ucwalmícwts)
10. Siouan (Note: Siouan languages: Dakȟótiyapi; Hohe Nakota; Stoney Nakoda)
11. Tsimshian (Note: Tsimshian languages: Gitxsanimaax; Nisg̱a’a; Sgüüx̣s; Sm'álgyax)
12. Wakashan (Note: Wakashan languages: diitiidʔaaʔtx̣; Haisla; Haíɫzaqv; Kwakʼwala; nuučaan̓uɫ; ’Wuik̓ala)
13. Beothuk
14. ?Plateau Sign (Note: Plateau Sign languages: ʾa·qanⱡiⱡⱡitnam; Secwepemcékst)

=== Pidgins, mixed languages, & trade languages ===
In Canada, as elsewhere in the world of European colonization, the frontier of European exploration and settlement tended to be a linguistically diverse and fluid place, as cultures using different languages met and interacted. The need for a common means of communication between the indigenous inhabitants and new arrivals for the purposes of trade and (in some cases) intermarriage led to the development of hybrid languages. These languages tended to be highly localized, were often spoken by only a small number of individuals who were frequently capable of speaking another language, and often persisted only briefly, before being wiped out by the arrival of a large population of permanent settlers, speaking either English or French.

==== Belle Isle Pidgin ====
Spoken until about 1760, this pidgin was spoken between Breton and Basque fishermen and NunatuKavummiut of NunatuKavut (Labrador).

==== Bungee ====
Named from the Ojibwe word bangii meaning "a little bit," the meagrely documented Bungi Creole (also known as Bungee, Bungy, Bungie, Bungay, and as the Red River Dialect) is a mixed language predominantly anchored in English that evolved within the Prairie Métis community, specifically the Countryborn or Anglo-Métis. Due to the multicultural nature of the Red River Settlement, Bungi was influenced by Scottish English, Nehiyawewin, Nakawemowin, the Orcadian dialect of Scots, Norn, Scottish Gaelic, and Canadian French. The vocabulary and word order were primarily English, but the speech was lilting like that of Gaelic speakers, with pronunciation and structural shifts coming from the Cree languages, such as: shawl becoming sawl, she becoming see, and the popular greeting I’m well, you but?. Bungi reached its peak in the nineteenth century, with about 5,000 Countryborn native speakers of the dialect in 1870. However, over the next century, standard Canadian English gradually replaced it; and by the late 1980s, only a handful of elderly speakers remained. It is generally considered to be asleep today.

==== Chiac ====
Spoken in the Maritime provinces (mostly in New Brunswick), Chiac is a creole language with a linguistic base in Acadian French and Maritime English with significant contributions from Mi'kmawi'simk and the Maliseet language. Notable for its code-switching between English and French, it is often popularly considered a variant of Franglais, with examples such as: Espère-moi su'l'corner, j'traverse le ch'min pi j'viens right back (Wait for me at the corner, I'm crossing the road and I'll be right back) and On va amarrer ça d'même pour faire sûr que ça tchenne (We will tie it like this to make sure it stays). However, Chiac is not simply a Franglais/Frenglish mix of French and English, as it differs distinctly from other French-English mixed-use cases such as those found amongst Fransaskois or Ontarois.

==== Chinook Jargon ====
In British Columbia, Yukon and throughout the Pacific Northwest, a pidgin language known as Chinook Jargon (also rendered "Chinook Wawa") emerged in the early 19th century that was a combination of Chinookan, Nootka, Chehalis, French and English, with a smattering of words from other languages including Hawaiian and Spanish. Later in that century, it had creolized in the Pacific Northwest. Certain words and expressions remain current in local use, such as skookum, tyee, and saltchuck, while a few have become part of worldwide English ("high mucketymuck" or "high muckamuck" for a high-ranking and perhaps self-important official).

==== Franglais ====
A portmanteau language which is said to combine English and French syntax, grammar and lexicons to form a unique interlanguage, is sometimes ascribed to mandatory basic French education in the Canadian anglophone school systems. Many unilingual anglophone Canadians, for instance, will borrow French words into their sentences. Simple words and phrases like "C'est quoi ça?" (what is that?) or words like "arrête" (stop) can alternate with their English counterparts. This phenomenon is more common in the eastern half of the country where there is a greater density of Francophone populations. Franglais can also refer to the supposed degradation of the French language thanks to the overwhelming impact Canadian English has on the country's Francophone inhabitants, though many linguists would argue that while English vocabulary can be freely borrowed as a stylistic device, the grammar of French has been resistant to influences from English and the same conservatism holds true in Canadian English grammar, even in Quebec City.

==== Haida Jargon ====
A pidgin trade language based on Haida, known as Haida Jargon, was used in the 1830s in and around Haida Gwaii. It was used by speakers of English, Haida, Coast Tsimshian, Heiltsuk, and other languages.

==== Loucheux Jargon ====
As a result of cultural contact between the Gwich'in (formerly called "Loucheaux") and Europeans (predominately French coureurs des bois and voyageurs), a pidgin language was historically used across Gwich'in Nành, Denendeh. The language is often called in English "Jargon Loucheux" using the traditional French syntax.

==== Michif ====
Michif (also known as Mitchif, Mechif, Michif-Cree, Métif, Métchif, and French Cree) is a mixed language which evolved within the Prairie Métis community that was oriented towards Cree and Franco-Catholic culture. It is based on elements of Cree and French along with elements of Ojibwa and Assiniboine. Michif is today spoken by fewer than 1,000 individuals in Saskatchewan, Manitoba and North Dakota. At its peak, around 1900, Michif was understood by perhaps three times this number.

==== Nootka Jargon ====
Based in the late 18th and early 19th centuries and likely one precursor to Chinook Wawa, Nootka Jargon was a trade language derived from Nuučaan̓uł, English, Spanish, and Russian, as well as other local languages.

==== Slavey Jargon ====
Also known as "Broken Slavey," this language was spoken until the mid-1900s, abruptly diminishing due to the influx of English into Denendeh and Inuit Nunangat. Documentation has also shown that the language was spoken by a range of fur traders, postmasters, and their wives, sisters, and daughters, who were often of Métis descent. The native languages of speakers who used Slavey Jargon were Denesuline, French, Gwich'in, Inuktitut, and the languages collectively known as "Slavey" (North: Sahtúgot’įné Yatı̨́, K’ashógot’įne Goxedǝ́, and Shíhgot’įne Yatı̨́; South: Dene Yatıé or Dene Zhatıé and Dené Dháh). The Dene, Inuit, French, British, and Métis who spoke the language did so predominately for preaching the gospel, teasing and harassing clergymen, and for interpersonal relationships. The use of Slavey Jargon can be characterized as an innovation employed by speakers in order to meet several linguistic goals, such as introductions, advice, and disputes. Mishler specified, "For all these reasons, Slavey Jargon seems inaccurate to characterize it strictly as a trade jargon" (p. 277).

Spoken predominately in the Liard and Dehcho Countries of Denendeh, the nouns of the language generally consisted of English, Dënësųłınë́ Yatıé, Sahtúgot’įné / Shíhgot’įne Yatı̨́ / K’ashógot’įne Goxedǝ́, and Dene Yatıé/Zhatıé, whereas the verbs and pronouns are derived from French. Adverbs are typically pulled from Dënësųłınë́ and Gwich’in. There is, however, a lot of variation in Slavey Jargon. Gwich’in verbs can be mixed with French nouns or phonemically modified French sentences exist.

==== Souriquois ====
Spoken alongside the Basque/Breton–Inuit Belle Isle pidgin was another pidgin language that developed in the 16th century amongst the Basque in coastal areas along the Gulf of Saint Lawrence and the Strait of Belle Isle as the result of contact between Basque whalers and local Algonquian peoples, notably the Mi'kmaq. The name "Souriquois" has an obscure history and most likely refers to region around Souris and the Basque suffix koa, perhaps from zurikoa “that of the whites."

=== Sign languages ===
Map of the various sign languages spoken across North America, excluding Francosign languages

Map of the North American Francosign languages

Alongside the numerous and varied oral languages, Canada also boasts several sign languages. Currently, Canada is home to some five or more sign languages (that number rising with the probability that Plains Sign Talk is actually a language family with several languages under its umbrella), belonging to four to six distinct language families, those being: the Francosign family, the BANZSL family, the Plains Sign family, the Inuit Sign isolate, perhaps the Coast Salish Sign isolate, and perhaps a Plateau Sign family composed of Secwepemcékst and Ktunaxa Sign Language.

As with all sign languages around the world that developed naturally, these are natural, human languages distinct from any oral language. As such, American Sign Language (unlike Signed English) is no more a derivation of English than Russian is, all being distinct languages from one another. Some languages present here were trade pidgins which were used first as a system of communication across national and linguistic boundaries of First Nations, however, they have since developed into mature languages as children learned them as a first language.

The sign languages of Canada share extremely limited rights within the country in large due to the general population's misinformation on the subject. Ontario is the only province or territory to formally make legal any sign language, enabling the use of American Sign Language, Quebec Sign Language (LSQ) and "First Nation Sign Language" (which could refer to Plains Sign Talk, Oneida Sign Language, or any other language) in only the domains of education, legislation and judiciary proceedings. The only other language afforded any other rights is Inuiuuk, which sees interpretation in the Legislative Assembly of Nunavut. There have been efforts to make LSQ an official language of Quebec, but all efforts have failed.

==== American Sign Language ====
The most utilized sign language in Canada, American Sign Language or ASL, can be found across the country in mostly anglophone regions. The ties with anglophone Canada are not due to ASL and English's similarity, but to cultural similarities and linguistic history (as several ASL words are borrowed from English). As such, ASL can be found in areas where English is not the primary language, such as Montreal or Nunavut. ASL is part of the French Sign Language (Francosign) family, originating on the East Coast of the United States from a mix of Langue des signes françaises (LSF) and other local languages.

===== Black American Sign Language =====
Amongst the Black communities of Canada, Black American Sign Language (BASL) is also spoken.

==== Coast Salish Sign Language ====
There is evidence that Coast Salish citizens speak a distinct sign language.

==== Hand Talk ====
Hand Talk was the primary written language and lingua franca of North America. It was used for all international relations, trade, and diplomacy across much of the continent until colonization. across the continent and the language stretched across the provinces down through Mexico. Its name comes from the language itself ("HANDS" + "TO-TALK-TO") and is preferred by Indigenous communities over other terms like "Plains Sign Language" or "First Nations Sign Languages". In fact, Hand Talk is a complex of several languages, with variants in the Northeast Woodlands, Great Basin, Southwest, and the Great Plains. It is unknown if Plateau Sign Language is related.

===== Oneida Sign Language =====
Born out of the Oneida Nation, OSL is a mixed language, descended primarily from both Hand Talk and the Oneida oral language, with some additions from ASL. Onʌyota'a:ká (or Oneida) Sign Language is a young and growing language, spreading especially amongst deaf Oneida citizens.

==== Inuit Sign Language ====
Inuit Sign Language, also known as Atgangmuurngniq or Uukturausingit, is a critically endangered language with some 50 speakers remaining. It is a language isolate and has only been found by researchers in Nunavut; however, there are theories it extends across the Arctic Circle. Little is known about its history, but efforts are being made to document and revitalize the language.

Maps of Maritime, Plateau, and Quebec Sign Languages

==== Maritime Sign Language ====
Maritime Sign Language is a BANZSL language. It was used as the language of education for Deaf populations in Nova Scotia, New Brunswick, and Prince Edward Island before ASL became available in the mid-20th century. It is still remembered by some elderly people but is moribund. The language, living alongside ASL, has produced a unique dialect of ASL in the Maritimes due to mixing of the languages. The exact number of speakers is unknown.

==== Plateau Sign Language ====
Another international language, Plateau Sign Language was/is spoken in the Columbia Plateau and surrounding regions of British Columbia, Washington, Oregon, and Idaho instead of Plains Sign Talk. There are few speakers left, mostly Elders.

===== Ktunaxa Sign Language =====
Called ʾa·qanⱡiⱡⱡitnam in the Ktunaxa language, Ktunaxa Sign Language has historically been spoken in Ktunaxa ɁamakaɁis (Ktunaxa Country).

===== Secwépemc Sign Language =====
Perhaps related to or descended from the old Plateau Sign Language, Secwepemcékst or Secwépemc Sign Language is spoken by a small number of Secwépemc citizens.

==== Quebec Sign Language ====
Alongside ASL, Quebec Sign Language or LSQ (Langue des signes québécoise) is the second most spoken sign language in the country. Centred mainly around and within Quebec, LSQ can also be found in Ontario, New Brunswick and various other parts of the country, generally around francophone communities due to historical ties to the French language. Although approximately 10% of the population of Quebec is deaf or hard-of-hearing, it is estimated that only 50,000 to 60,000 children use LSQ as their native language. LSQ is part of the Francosign family with ASL. As such, both languages are mutually intelligible.

==== Sawmill Sign Language ====
Spoken by the sawmill workers of BC, this sign language was used by predominately hearing staff during work hours and in socializing with co-workers.

=== Canadian dialects of European languages ===
==== Acadian French ====
Acadian French is a unique form of Canadian French which incorporates not only distinctly Canadian phrases but also nautical terms, English loanwords, linguistic features found only in older forms of French as well as ones found in the Maritimer English dialect.

===== Brayon French =====
A sub-dialect of Acadian French, Brayon French is spoken by those in Madawaska County of New Brunswick. The language is a mix of Acadian and Quebec French with influence from the local Mi'kmaw and Maliseet languages, with only slight differentiation from the more standard Acadian French.

==== Québec French ====
As the most spoken variety of French in Canada, Québec French contains a significant number of dialects, generally grouped in two: the "old" dialects of the territories at the time of the British conquest and the "new" dialects that arose post-conquest.

===== Chaouin French =====
Around 1615 as the coureurs des bois moved past the city of Quebec, those who settled in Ndakinna (Abenaki land) developed unique features still found today, especially in the Bois-Francs region South of the St. Lawrence.

===== Joual French =====
Originally the dialect of the French-speaking working class in Montréal, the cultural renaissance connected to the Quiet Revolution have resulted in Joual being spoken by people across the educational and economic spectrum.

===== Màgoua French =====
Possibly deriving from the Atikamekw word for "loon" (makwa; standard French: huard), the French spoken by the Magoua community is one of the most conservative French dialects in North America. This basilectal dialect is found in Nitaskinan as the Trois-Rivièresregion became the first stronghold of the coureurs des bois outside the city of Quebec in 1615. Magoua French preserves the sontaient ("étaient") characteristic of Métis French and Cajun French, has a creole-like past tense particle tà, and has old present-tense contraction of a former verb "to be" that behave in the same manner as subject clitics.

==== Métis French ====
Alongside Michif and Bungi, the Métis dialect of French is one of the traditional languages of the Métis people, and the French-dialect source of the Michif language. Métis French is a variety of Canadian French with some added characters Ññ, Áá, Óó, and Ææ (from older French spellings), such as: il ñá ócun nævus sur ce garçon English: "there is no birthmark on this boy." There are also significant amounts of words loaned from indigenous languages such as Ojibwemowin, Dane-zaa Ẕáágéʔ (Beaver), and several Cree languages. Like Michif, Métis French is spoken predominantly in Manitoba as well as adjacent provinces and US states. As a general rule, Métis individuals tend to speak one or the other, rarely both.

==== Newfoundland French ====
Tracing their origins to Continental French fishermen who settled in the late 1800s and early 1900s, rather than the Québécois, Newfoundland French (or français terre-neuvien) refers to the French spoken on the Port au Port Peninsula (part of the so-called “French Shore”) of Newfoundland. Some Acadians of the Maritimes also settled in the area. For this reason, Newfoundland French is most closely related to the Breton and Norman French of nearby St-Pierre-et-Miquelon. Today, heavy contact with Acadian French—and especially widespread bilingualism with Newfoundland English—have taken their toll, and the community is in decline. The degree to which lexical features of Newfoundland French constitute a distinct dialect is not presently known. It is uncertain how many speakers survive; the dialect could be moribund. There is a provincial advocacy organisation Fédération des Francophones de Terre-Neuve et du Labrador, representing both the Peninsular French and Acadian French communities.

==== Ontarois French ====
Although quite similar to Quebec French, the dialect of the Ontarois or Franco-Ontarians maintains distinctive features. These include the progressive disappearance of the subjunctive, the transfer of rules from English to French, e.g., "J’ai vu un film sur/à la télévision" which comes from "I saw a film on television", and the loaning of English conjunctions such as "so" for ça fait que or alors.

==== Black English ====
In what is also called Black Canadian, Afro-Canadian, or African Canadian English, there exist several varieties of English spoken by Black Canadians. The most well-established is the dialect spoken by Afro-Nova Scotians. In places like Toronto where there is a large population of Afro-Caribbean descendants and newcomers, localized varieties of Black English take on elements of Caribbean English, as well as mixing with African-American Vernacular English (AAVE). Although AAVE is not nearly as widespread in Canada as it is across the United States, Black Canadians have various lines of connection to the dialect. Sometimes that connection is historical, such as with Black Nova Scotians; sometimes it is hegemonic, where Afro-Canadians adopt speech mannerisms from the larger United States; sometimes it is diasporic, where communities of African-American newcomers or African-American descendants coalesce, especially in larger cities.

===== Afro-Nova Scotian English =====
African Nova Scotian English is spoken by descendants of Black Nova Scotians, black immigrants from the United States. Though most African American freedom seekers in Canada ended up in Ontario through the Underground Railroad, only the dialect of African Nova Scotians retains the influence of West African pidgin. In the 19th century, African Nova Scotian English would have been indistinguishable from English spoken in Jamaica or Suriname. However, it has been increasingly de-creolized since this time, due to interaction and influence from the white Nova Scotian population. Desegregation of the province's school boards in 1964 further accelerated the process of de-creolization. The language is a relative of the African-American Vernacular English, with significant variations unique to the group's history in the area. There are noted differences in the dialects of those from Guysborough County (Black Loyalists), and those from North Preston (Black Refugees), the Guysborough group having been in the province three generations earlier.

Howe and Walker use data from early recordings of African Nova Scotian English, Samaná English, and the recordings of former slaves to demonstrate that speech patterns were inherited from nonstandard colonial English. The dialect was extensively studied in 1992 by Shana Poplack and Sali Tagliamonte from the University of Ottawa.

A commonality between African Nova Scotian English and African-American Vernacular English is (r)-deletion. This rate of deletion is 57% among Black Nova Scotians, and 60% among African Americans in Philadelphia. Meanwhile, in the surrounding mostly white communities of Nova Scotia, (r)-deletion does not occur.

==== Cascadian English ====
The English language in British Columbia shares numerous features with the neighbouring states of Washington and Oregon, such as the /æɡ/ raising (found words such as bag, vague and bagel). Boreal Cascadian English speakers exhibit more vowel retraction of /æ/ before nasals than people from Toronto, and younger speakers in the Greater Vancouver area do not raise /aʊ/ as much, but keep the drop in intonation, causing "about" to sound slightly like "a baht." The "o" in such words as holy, goal, load, know, etc. is pronounced as a close-mid back rounded vowel, [o], but not as rounded as in the Prairies where there are strong Scandinavian, Slavic and German influences, which can lend to a more stereotypical "Canadian" accent.

==== Indigenous English ====
The varieties of English spoken by indigenous people are phonologically influenced by their first or traditional languages. This has resulted in an identifiable dialect spectrum distinct from other Canadian English dialects. Due to the ongoing stigmatization of indigenous cultures, indigenous children could be wrongly diagnosed as having a speech impairment or a learning disability, when what is identified by medical professionals are simply the dialectal features.

Some written works use indigenous English dialects. For example, Maria Campbell's book Stories of the Road Allowance People is a collection of Métis folktales. An excerpt from that work illustrates the type of speech used by Elders in rural Métis communities during her research, but some stories were collected in Cree or other languages and translated into dialectical English by Campbell:

Dere wasen very much he can steal from dah table anyways
'cept da knives and forks.
An Margareet he knowed he wouldn dare take dem
cause dat woman you know
hees gots a hell of a repetation for being a hardheaded woman
when he gets mad.
Dat man he have to be a damn fool to steal from hees table.

— Dah Teef

==== Lunenburg English ====
Spoken in Lunenburg and Lunenburg County, Nova Scotia, this moribund dialect is sometimes called "Lunenburg Dutch" due to its rooting in the large Kurpfalzisch and Württembergisch population who settled the town. Although the German language subsided significantly, the English of the town and county continue to be marked by its influence. Indeed, the pronunciation in Lunenburg county is the only Canadian community to be non-rhotic. The accent features Canadian raising and so flight [ˈflʌɪt] has a different vowel from fly [ˈflɑɪ], and the noun house [ˈhoʊs] has a different vowel from the verb house [ˈhɑʊz]. In Lunenburg, the phrase about a boat contains two identical stressed and two identical unstressed vowels: /əˌboʊt ə ˈboʊt/, rather than the Standard Canadian English /əˌbaʊt ə ˈboʊt/, with distinct stressed vowels. Due to German influence, there is a tendency to pronounce /w/ in witch the same as /v/ as in van. Another example is the lack of the dental fricatives /θ/ and /ð/, which are replaced by the alveolar stops /t/ and /d/ (rendering "thank" and "tank" homophonous as /ˈtæŋk/), and the "t" at the end of words is usually silent: "get" becomes "ge."

For example, here is a sample of a conversation between two people:

"De kids vere over der in da woods, gettin inda dis an dat."
"Dey never did?"
"Yeah, an now dey gone da get some of dem der apples you see."
"You don't say?"
"No foolin, dey over der now."
"Dey brung some of dem apples over heera da day before."
"Oh, dey vere some good eatin I bet."
"Now look, you make no nevermind, dose vere da best apples I ever did have, dey vas some good."
"Oh, here dey come now, dey bedda know da wash der feet off."

==== Maritime English ====
Spoken across the provinces of Nova Scotia, New Brunswick, and PEI, this English dialect has been influenced by British and Irish English, Irish and Scottish Gaelic, and some Acadian French, as well as by Mi'kmawi'simk.

==== Newfoundland English ====
The initial European settlers to Newfoundland were fishermen from the various coastal villages of the English West Country of Cornwall, Devon, Dorset, Somerset, Bristol, and Wiltshire beginning in the 1500s (previously they visited in summer and returned). This set the basic speech patterns for those settlers who fanned out into isolated coves and bays along the island's 9,700 km (6,000 mi) of coastline to take advantage of the scattered off-shore fishing areas. Labrador, today the greater part of "Newfoundland", was then sparsely settled. The West Country dialects continued to be spoken in isolated coves and fjords of the island thus preserving varied dialects of what is today referred to as Newfoundland English.

It was not until the 1700s that social disruptions in Ireland sent thousands of Irish from the southeastern counties of Waterford, Wexford, Kilkenny, and Cork and to the Avalon peninsula in the eastern part of Newfoundland where significant Irish influence on the Newfoundland dialects may still be heard.

Some of the Irish immigrants to Newfoundland were native speakers of Irish making Newfoundland the only place outside Europe to have its own Irish dialect. Newfoundland was also the only place outside Europe to have its own distinct name in Irish: Talamh an Éisc, which means 'land of the fish'. The Irish language is now extinct in Newfoundland.

After 400 years, much of the dialectal differences between the isolated settlements has levelled out beginning in the 20th century when faster boats (using gas engines instead of oars or sails), and improved road connections provided easier social contact. As well, influences from mainland North America began to affect the local dialects beginning during WWII when US and Canadian servicemen were stationed in Newfoundland and accelerating after Newfoundland became a Canadian province in 1949. Lack of an official orthography, publications in dialect, speaker attrition and official disinterest in promoting the language has been contributing factors towards a decline of speakers of the older, traditional Newfoundland English in the original settlements.

==== Ottawa Valley Twang ====
Ottawa Valley Twang is the accent, sometimes referred to as a dialect of English, that is spoken in the Ottawa Valley, in Ontario. The Ottawa Valley is considered to be a linguistic enclave within Ontario.

==== Quebec English ====
The language of English-speaking Quebecers generally aligns to Standard Canadian English, however established ethnic groups retain certain, distinctive lexical features, such as the dialects spoken by Mohawk, Cree, Inuit, Irish, Jewish, Italian, and Greek communities. Isolated fishing villages on the Basse-Côte-Nord speak Newfoundland English, and many Gaspesian English-speakers use Maritime English.

==== Toronto slang ====
Spoken within the Greater Toronto Area, Toronto slang is the nuanced, multicultural English spoken in the city. This dialect is heavily influenced by the different communities present, most notably the Jamaican, Trinidadian, Guyanese, and other Caribbean communities and their ways of speaking. There is also influence from West African, East African, and South Asian communities.

==== Canadian Gaelic ====
Canadian Gaelic was spoken by many immigrants who settled in Glengarry County (Ontario) and the Maritimes—predominantly in New Brunswick's Restigouche River valley, central and southeastern Prince Edward Island, and across the whole of northern Nova Scotia—particularly Cape Breton. While the Canadian Gaelic dialect has mostly disappeared, regional pockets persist. These are mostly centred on families deeply committed to their Celtic traditions. Nova Scotia currently has 500–1,000 fluent speakers, mostly in northwestern Cape Breton. There have been attempts in Nova Scotia to institute Gaelic immersion on the model of French immersion. As well, formal post-secondary studies in Gaelic language and culture are available through St. Francis Xavier University, Saint Mary's University, and Cape Breton University

In 1890, a private member's bill was tabled in the Canadian Senate, calling for Gaelic to be made Canada's third official language. However, the bill was defeated 42–7.

==== Newfoundland Irish ====
Newfoundland is home to the largest population of Irish-descendants in Canada and once hosted a thriving Irish Gaelic linguistic community. Although steep declines around the 20th century meant that the Irish language on the Island hardly remains, there exists today strong interest with consistent efforts to revive the language.

Newfoundland Irish has left an impact on the English spoken on the Island, including terms like scrob "scratch" (Irish scríob), sleveen "rascal" (Irish slíbhín) and streel "slovenly person" (Irish sraoill), along with grammatical features like the "after" perfect as in "she's already after leavin'" (Irish tá sí tar éis imeacht). As well, both Newfoundland (Talamh an Éisc, Land of the Fish) and St. John's (Baile Sheáin) have distinct names in the Irish-language. The dialect of Irish spoken in Newfoundland is said to resemble the Munster Irish of the 18th century.

Events and institutions are increasingly supporting the language with ever larger Céilithe móra, students participating in Conradh na Gaeilge events, people playing Gaelic sports, and Irish film festivals attracting English- and Irish-speakers alike. There is also an Irish language instructor, appointed every year by the Ireland Canada University Foundation, who works at Memorial University in St. John's, where the university's Digital Learning Centre provides resources for learning the Irish language.

==== Newfoundland Welsh ====
Some Welsh is found in Newfoundland. In part, this is as a result of Welsh settlement since the 17th century. Also, there was an influx of about 1,000 Patagonian Welsh, who migrated to Canada from Argentina after the 1982 Falklands War. Welsh-Argentines are fluent in Spanish as well as English and Welsh.

==== Canadian Ukrainian ====
Canada is also home to Canadian Ukrainian, a distinct dialect of the Ukrainian language, spoken mostly in Western Canada by the descendants of first two waves of Ukrainian settlement in Canada who developed in a degree of isolation from their cousins in what was then Austria-Hungary, the Russian Empire, Poland, and the Soviet Union.

==== Doukhobor Russian ====
Canada's Doukhobor community, especially in Grand Forks and Castlegar, British Columbia, has kept its distinct dialect of Russian. It has a lot in common with South Russian dialects, showing some common features with Ukrainian. This dialect's versions are becoming extinct in their home regions of Georgia and Russia where the Doukhobors have split into smaller groups.

==== Deitsch ====
A variety of West Central German spoken by the Old Order Amish, Old Order Mennonites and other descendants of German immigrants in Canada, Pennsylvania Dutch or Deitsch is closely related to the Palatine dialects of the Upper Rhine Valley. Of the estimated 300,000 speakers, most are found across several US states, whilst there is a sizable community within Ontario.

==== Hutterisch ====
Centred in Alberta, Saskatchewan, and Manitoba, the Hutterite communities maintain a distinct form of the German language descended from Bavarian dialects spoken in Tyrol (by founder Jacob Hutter). The language shifted in the mid-18th century toward a more Carinthian linguistic base upon the deportation of Landler from Austria to Transylvania. There is only about a 50% intelligibility between Pennsylvania Dutch speakers and Hutterisch. Its speaker base belongs to the Schmiedleit, Lehrerleit, and Dariusleit groups with a few speakers among the older generations of Prairieleit (the descendants of those Hutterites who chose not to settle in colonies). Hutterite children who grow up in the colonies first learn and speak Hutterisch before learning English. Of the estimated 34,000 speakers in the world (as of 2003), 85% of them live in 370 communities in Canada. Canadian adults are generally literate in Early New High German (also called "Biblical German", the predecessor to Standard German used by Martin Luther) that they employ as the written form for Scriptures, however Hutterisch is, for the most part, an unwritten language.

==== Plautdietsch ====
Plautdietsch is predominantly found in Saskatchewan, Manitoba, and Ontario where Mennonite communities settled. The Mennonites, or Russian Mennonites as they are sometimes called, descend from Low country Anabaptists who fled from what is today the Netherlands and Belgium in the 16th century to escape persecution and resettled in the Vistula delta. Their language is a fusion of Dutch, West Frisian and Dutch Low Saxon dialects which over time mixed with the East Low German dialects of Werdersch, Nehrungisch and Weichselisch.

== Official bilingualism ==
=== Language policy of the federal government ===
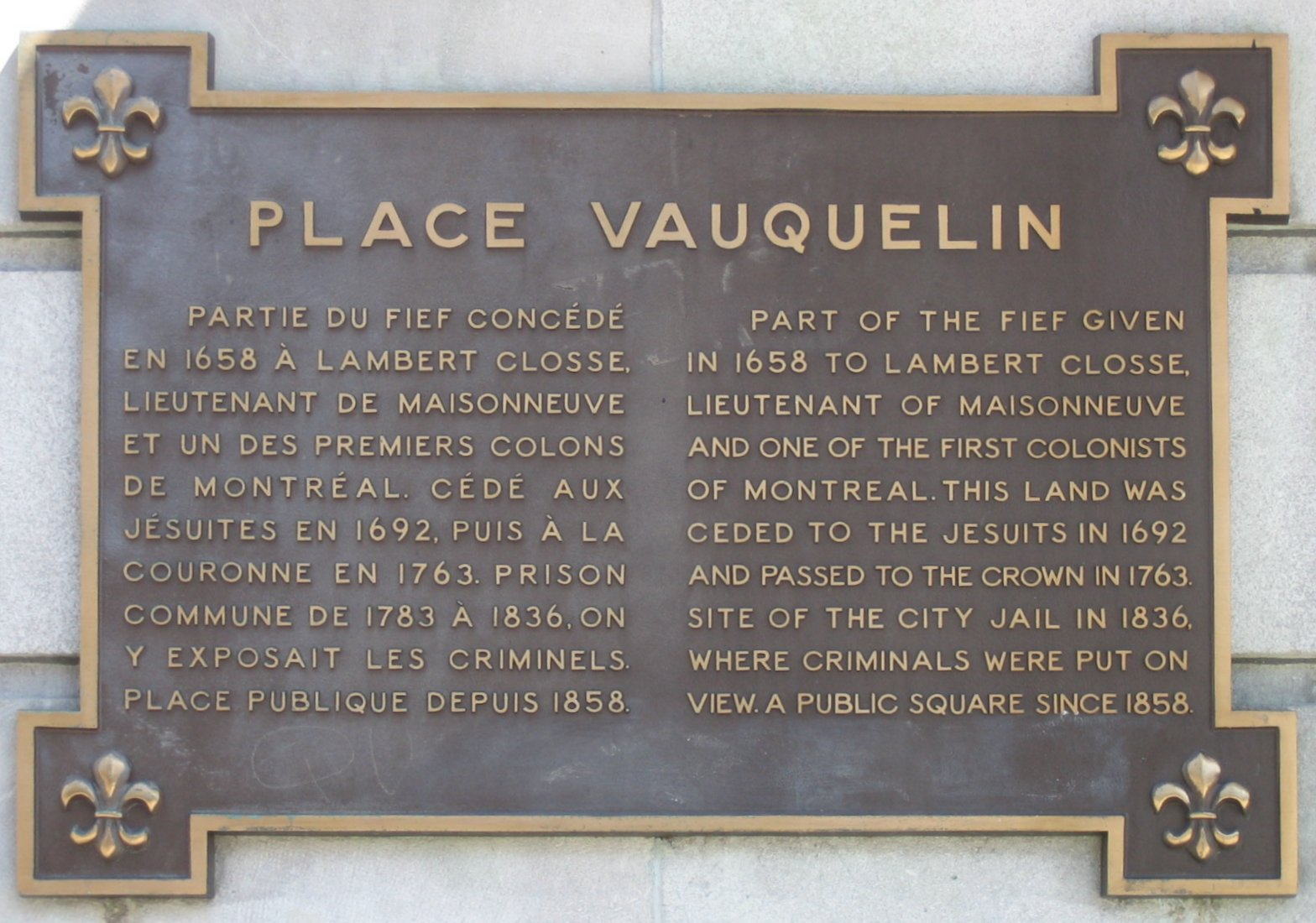
A bilingual sign in Montreal

English and French have equal status in federal courts, the Parliament of Canada, as well as in all federal institutions.

The public has the right, where there is sufficient demand, to receive federal government services in either English or French. Immigrants who are applying for Canadian citizenship must normally be able to speak either English or French.

The principles of bilingualism in Canada are protected in sections 16 to 23 of the Canadian Charter of Rights and Freedoms of 1982 which establishes that:

- French and English are equal to each other as federal official languages;
- Debate in Parliament may take place in either official language;
- Federal laws shall be printed in both official languages, with equal authority;
- Anyone may deal with any court established by Parliament, in either official language;
- Everyone has the right to receive services from the federal government in his or her choice of official language;
- Members of a minority language group of one of the official languages if learned and still understood (i.e., French speakers in a majority English-speaking province, or vice versa) or received primary school education in that language has the right to have their children receive a public education in their language, where numbers warrant.

Canada's Official Languages Act, first adopted in 1969 and updated in 1988, gives English and French equal status throughout federal institutions.

=== Language policies of Canada's provinces and territories ===
==== Officially bilingual or multilingual: New Brunswick, Nova Scotia, and the three territories ====
New Brunswick, Nova Scotia, and Canada's three territories have all given official status to more than one language. In the case of New Brunswick, this means perfect equality. In the other cases, the recognition sometimes amounts to a formal recognition of official languages, but limited services in official languages other than English.

The official languages are:

- New Brunswick: English and French. New Brunswick has been officially bilingual since the 1960s. The province's officially bilingual status has been entrenched in the Canadian Charter of Rights and Freedoms since 1982.
- Nova Scotia: Mi'kmawi'simk is considered the province's official "first language."
- Northwest Territories: Cree, Dënësųłıné, Dene Yatıé / Dene Zhatıé, English, French, Gwich’in, Inuinnaqtun, Inuktitut, Inuvialuktun, Sahtúgot’įné Yatı̨́ / K’ashógot’įne Goxedǝ́ / Shíhgot’įne Yatı̨́, and Tłįchǫ.
- Nunavut: English, Inuktut (Inuktitut, Inuinnaqtun), and French.
- Yukon: English and French.

==== Officially French-only: Quebec ====
Until 1969, Quebec was the only officially bilingual province in Canada and most public institutions functioned in both languages. English was also used in the legislature, government commissions and courts. With the adoption of the Charter of the French Language (also known as "Bill 101") by Quebec's National Assembly in August 1977, however, French became Quebec's sole official language. However, the Charter of the French Language enumerates a defined set of language rights for the English language and for Aboriginal languages, and government services are available, to certain citizens and in certain regions, in English. As well, a series of court decisions have forced the Quebec government to increase its English-language services beyond those provided for under the original terms of the Charter of the French Language. Regional institutions in the Nunavik region of northern Quebec offer services in Inuktitut and Cree.

==== De facto English only, or limited French-language services: the other eight provinces ====
Most provinces have laws that make either English or both English and French the official language(s) of the legislature and the courts but may also have separate policies in regards to education and the bureaucracy.

For example, in Alberta, English and French are both official languages of debate in the Legislative Assembly, but laws may be drafted solely in English and there is no legal requirement that they be translated into French. French can be used in some lower courts and education is offered in both languages, but the bureaucracy functions almost solely in English. Therefore, although Alberta is not officially an English-only province, English has a higher de facto status than French. Ontario and Manitoba are similar but allow for more services in French at the local level.

== Geographic distribution ==
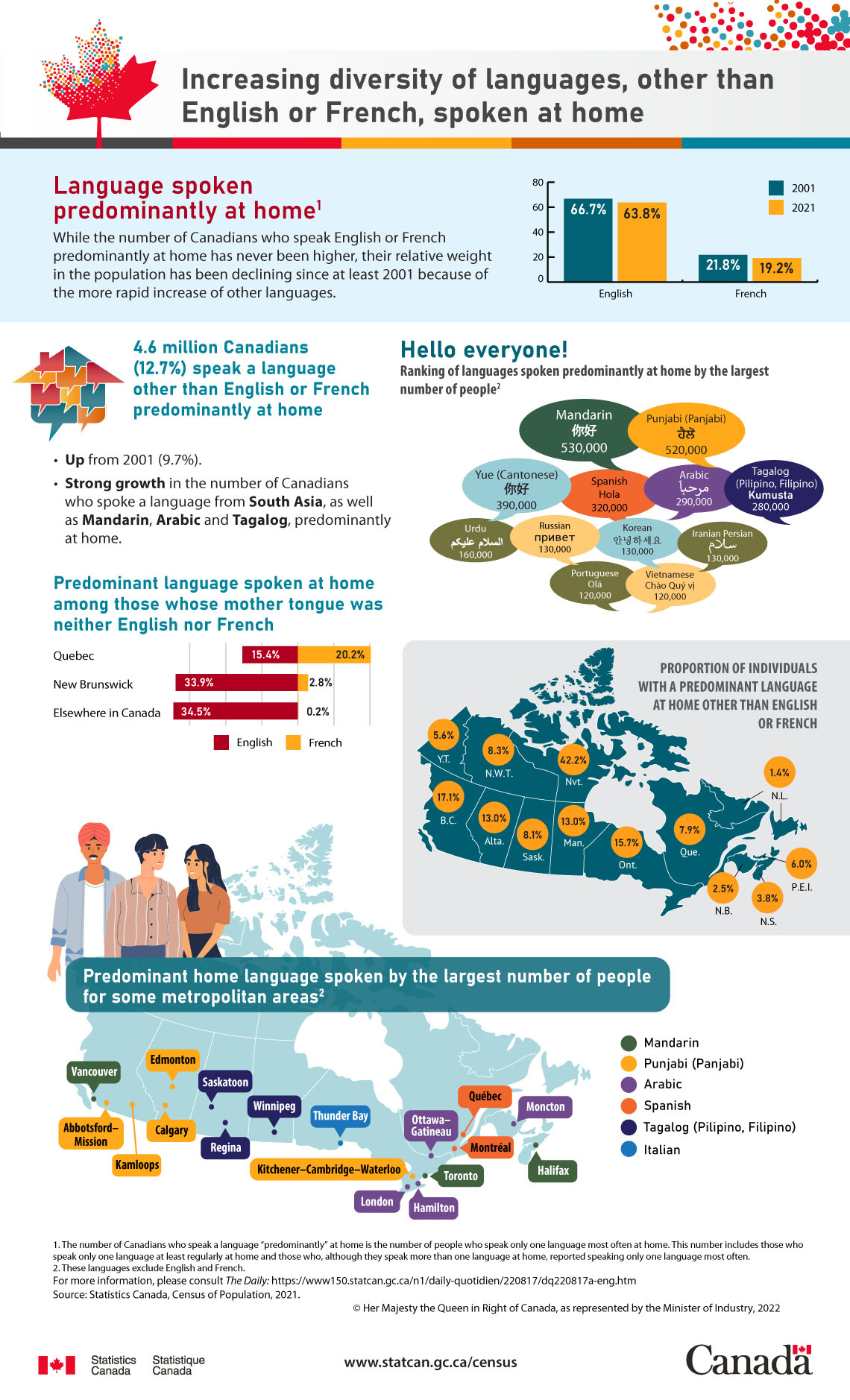
Languages spoken in Canadian households

The following table details the population of each province and territory, with summary national totals, by mother tongue as reported in the Canada 2016 Census.

Province/territory	Total population	English	%	French	%	Other languages	%	Official language(s)
Ontario	13,312,870	9,255,660	69.52%	568,345	4.27%	3,865,780	29.04%	English (de facto)
Quebec	8,066,555	718,985	8.91%	6,377,080	79.06%	1,173,345	14.54%	French
British Columbia	4,598,415	3,271,425	71.14%	71,705	1.56%	1,360,815	29.59%	English (de facto)
Alberta	4,026,650	3,080,865	76.51%	86,705	2.15%	952,790	23.66%	English
Manitoba	1,261,615	931,410	73.83%	46,055	3.65%	316,120	25.06%	English
Saskatchewan	1,083,240	910,865	84.09%	17,735	1.64%	173,475	16.01%	English
Nova Scotia	912,300	838,055	91.86%	33,345	3.66%	49,165	5.39%	English (de facto) (Note: Nova Scotia has since enacted Miꞌkmaq as the province’s first language)
New Brunswick	736,280	481,690	65.42%	238,865	32.44%	25,165	3.42%	English, French
Newfoundland and Labrador	515,680	501,350	97.22%	3,020	0.59%	13,035	2.53%	English (de facto)
Prince Edward Island	141,020	128,975	91.46%	5,395	3.83%	7,670	5.44%	English (de facto)
Northwest Territories	41,380	32,545	78.65%	1,365	3.30%	8,295	20.05%	Cree, Dënësųłıné, Dene Yatıé / Zhatıé, English, French, Gwich’in, Inuinnaqtun, Inuktitut, Inuvialuktun, Sahtúgot’įné Yatı̨́ / K’ashógot’įne Goxedǝ́ / Shíhgot’įne Yatı̨́, Tłįchǫ
Yukon	35,555	29,765	83.72%	1,815	5.10%	4,665	13.12%	English, French
Nunavut	35,695	11,745	32.90%	640	1.79%	24,050	67.38%	Inuit Language (Inuktitut, Inuinnaqtun), English, French
Canada	34,767,255	20,193,340	58.08%	7,452,075	21.43%	7,974,375	22.94%	English, French

Source: Statistics Canada, Mother tongue by age (Total), 2016 counts for the population excluding institutional residents of Canada, provinces and territories, 2016 Census .

== Knowledge of languages ==
Top ten spoken languages in Canada 2021 census (Note: The question on knowledge of languages allows for multiple responses. The following figures are from the 2021 Canadian Census.)
Language	Percent
English	87.06%
French	29.08%
Chinese (Note: 2021 census: Combined responses of the Chinese languages, including Mandarin (987,300), Cantonese (724,925), Min Nan, Hakka, Wu (Shanghainese), Min Dong, Chinese, n.o.s., and Chinese languages, n.i.e. (Note: n.i.e. – not included elsewhere))	4.21%
Hindustani (Note: 2021 census: Combined responses of Hindi (761,425) and Urdu (414,870) as they form mutually intelligible registers of the Hindustani language.)	3.24%
Spanish	3.22%
Punjabi	2.59%
Arabic	2.31%
Tagalog	2.03%
Italian	1.51%
German	1.15%

The question on knowledge of languages allows for multiple responses, and first appeared on the 1991 Canadian census. (Note: The 1991 Census was the first to ask Canadians whether they could conduct a conversation in a language other than English or French) The following figures are from the 1991 Canadian census, 2001 Canadian census, 2011 Canadian census, and the 2021 Canadian census.

Language	2021		2011		2001		1991	
Language	Pop.	%	Pop.	%	Pop.	%	Pop.	%
English	31,628,570	87.06%	28,360,235	85.63%	25,246,220	85.18%	22,505,415	83.37%
French	10,563,235	29.08%	9,960,585	30.07%	9,178,100	30.97%	8,508,960	31.52%
Chinese	1,528,860	4.21%	1,297,505	3.92%	1,028,445	3.47%	557,305	2.06%
Hindustani	1,176,295	3.24%	576,165	1.74%	366,740	1.24%	163,930	0.61%
Spanish	1,171,450	3.22%	873,395	2.64%	610,580	2.06%	402,430	1.49%
Punjabi	942,170	2.59%	545,730	1.65%	338,720	1.14%	167,925	0.62%
Arabic	838,045	2.31%	470,965	1.42%	290,280	0.98%	164,380	0.61%
Tagalog	737,565	2.03%	491,075	1.48%	244,690	0.83%	136,975	0.51%
Italian	547,655	1.51%	595,600	1.8%	680,970	2.3%	701,910	2.6%
German	419,195	1.15%	525,480	1.59%	635,520	2.14%	684,955	2.54%
Portuguese	336,865	0.93%	266,950	0.81%	264,990	0.89%	254,465	0.94%
Persian (Note: 2021 census: Combined responses of Iranian Persian (222,160), Dari, and Persian (Farsi), n.o.s., as they form mutually intelligible registers of the Persian language, and as they were all categorized under "Persian" in previous censuses.)	330,725	0.91%	196,110	0.59%	111,700	0.38%	49,380	0.18%
Russian	309,235	0.85%	230,755	0.7%	157,455	0.53%	84,050	0.31%
Tamil	237,890	0.65%	179,465	0.54%	111,580	0.38%	37,330	0.14%
Vietnamese	232,800	0.64%	192,070	0.58%	165,645	0.56%	113,115	0.42%
Gujarati	209,410	0.58%	118,950	0.36%	80,835	0.27%	54,210	0.2%
Polish	204,460	0.56%	217,735	0.66%	249,695	0.84%	239,575	0.89%
Korean	203,885	0.56%	149,035	0.45%	91,610	0.31%	40,230	0.15%
Serbo-Croatian (Note: Including Bosnian, Croatian, Serbian, and Serbo-Croatian, n.i.e.)	155,775	0.43%	154,700	0.47%	153,085	0.52%	100,541	0.37%
Greek	145,060	0.4%	150,620	0.45%	158,800	0.54%	161,320	0.6%
Haitian Creole	134,895	0.37%	128,555	0.39%	76,140	0.26%	49,970	0.19%
Ukrainian	131,655	0.36%	144,260	0.44%	200,520	0.68%	249,535	0.92%
Bengali	120,605	0.33%	69,490	0.21%	34,650	0.12%	N/A	<0.1%
Romanian	116,520	0.32%	97,180	0.29%	60,520	0.2%	30,520	0.11%
Dutch	107,985	0.3%	135,085	0.41%	157,875	0.53%	173,290	0.64%
Cree (Note: 2021 census: Total number of speakers of the Cree-Innu languages, previously categorized under "Cree" in past censuses.)	105,850	0.29%	96,690	0.29%	97,200	0.33%	93,825	0.35%
Japanese	98,070	0.27%	74,690	0.23%	65,030	0.22%	45,370	0.17%
Hebrew	83,205	0.23%	70,695	0.21%	63,675	0.21%	52,450	0.19%
Turkish	78,500	0.22%	44,080	0.13%	32,520	0.11%	N/A	<0.1%
Malayalam	77,910	0.21%	22,125	0.07%	9,185	0.03%	N/A	<0.1%
Hungarian	64,625	0.18%	73,695	0.22%	89,230	0.3%	97,410	0.36%
Ilocano	61,680	0.17%	21,880	0.07%	N/A	<0.03%	N/A	<0.1%
Somali	59,005	0.16%	37,115	0.11%	N/A	<0.03%	N/A	<0.1%
Swahili	57,295	0.16%	31,690	0.1%	25,300	0.09%	N/A	<0.1%
Telugu	54,685	0.15%	12,645	0.04%	N/A	<0.03%	N/A	<0.1%

=== Knowledge of official languages ===
Knowledge of Official Languages in Canada
Language	2021		2016		2011		2006		2001	
Language	Pop.	%	Pop.	%	Pop.	%	Pop.	%	Pop.	%
English total	31,628,570	87.06%	29,973,590	86.21%	28,360,235	85.63%	26,578,795	85.08%	25,246,220	85.18%
French total	10,563,235	29.08%	10,360,750	29.8%	9,960,585	30.07%	9,590,700	30.7%	9,178,100	30.97%
English only	25,261,655	69.54%	23,757,525	68.33%	22,564,665	68.13%	21,129,945	67.64%	20,014,645	67.53%
French only	4,087,895	11.25%	4,144,685	11.92%	4,165,015	12.58%	4,141,850	13.26%	3,946,525	13.32%
English & French	6,581,680	18.12%	6,216,065	17.88%	5,795,570	17.5%	5,448,850	17.44%	5,231,575	17.65%
Neither English nor French	689,725	1.9%	648,970	1.87%	595,920	1.8%	520,385	1.67%	446,285	1.51%

== Speakers by mother tongue ==
Languages in Canada (Mother Tongue) 2016 Census
Language	Percent
English	57.8%
Non-official	21.1%
French	20.6%
English and French	0.5%

First language	2016		2011		2006		Notes
First language	Pop.	%	Pop.	%	Pop.	%	Notes
Single language responses	33,947,610	97.64%	32,481,635	98.07%	30,848,270	98.74%	
Official languages	26,627,545	76.59%	25,913,955	78.24%	24,700,425	79.06%	
English	19,460,855	55.97%	18,858,980	56.94%	17,882,775	57.24%	
French	7,166,700	20.61%	7,054,975	21.3%	6,817,650	21.82%	
Non-official languages	7,321,070	21.06%	6,567,680	19.83%	6,147,840	19.68%	
Combined Chinese Responses	1,227,680	3.53%	n/a	n/a	n/a	n/a	Combined responses of Mandarin, Cantonese, Chinese n.o.s. and Min Nan
Mandarin (Standard Chinese)	592,035	1.7%	248,705	0.75%	170,950	0.55%	
Cantonese	565,275	1.63%	372,460	1.12%	361,450	1.16%	
Punjabi	501,680	1.44%	430,705	1.3%	367,505	1.18%	
Spanish	458,850	1.32%	410,670	1.24%	345,345	1.11%	
Tagalog (Filipino)	431,385	1.24%	327,445	0.99%	235,615	0.75%	
Arabic	419,895	1.21%	327,870	0.99%	261,640	0.84%	
German	384,040	1.1%	409,200	1.24%	450,570	1.44%	
Italian	375,645	1.08%	407,485	1.23%	455,040	1.46%	
Hindustani	321,465	0.92%	263,345	0.8%	224,045	0.72%	Combined responses of Hindi and Urdu
Portuguese	221,535	0.64%	211,335	0.64%	219,275	0.7%	
Persian (Farsi)	214,200	0.62%	170,045	0.51%	134,080	0.43%	
Urdu	210,820	0.61%	172,800	0.52%	145,805	0.47%	
Russian	188,255	0.54%	164,330	0.5%	133,580	0.43%	
Polish	181,705	0.52%	191,645	0.58%	211,175	0.68%	
Vietnamese	156,430	0.45%	144,880	0.44%	141,625	0.45%	
Korean	153,425	0.44%	137,925	0.42%	125,570	0.4%	
Tamil	140,720	0.4%	131,265	0.4%	115,880	0.37%	Most of the Canadian Tamils live in Toronto.
Hindi	110,645	0.32%	90,545	0.27%	78,240	0.25%	
Gujarati	108,775	0.31%	91,450	0.28%	81,465	0.26%	
Greek	106,520	0.31%	108,925	0.33%	117,285	0.38%	
Ukrainian	102,485	0.29%	111,540	0.34%	134,500	0.43%	
Dutch	99,015	0.28%	110,490	0.33%	128,900	0.41%	
Romanian	96,660	0.28%	90,300	0.27%	78,495	0.25%	
Bengali	73,125	0.21%	59,370	0.18%	45,685	0.15%	
Creoles	72,130	0.21%	61,725	0.19%	53,515	0.17%	
Cree, n.o.s.	64,045	0.18%	77,900	0.24%	78,855	0.25%	In the 2006 Census, this language was referred to simply as 'Cree'.
Hungarian	61,235	0.18%	67,920	0.21%	73,335	0.23%	The majority of Hungarian speakers in Canada live in Ontario. A community of Hungarian speakers is found within a part of Windsor, Ontario.
Berber languages (Kabyle)	n/a	n/a	57,855	0.17%	25,578	0.08%	
Serbian	57,345	0.16%	56,420	0.17%	51,665	0.17%	
Croatian	48,200	0.14%	49,730	0.15%	55,330	0.18%	
Japanese	43,640	0.13%	39,985	0.12%	40,200	0.13%	
Chinese, n.o.s.	38,575	0.11%	425,210	1.28%	456,705	1.46%	
Somali	36,760	0.11%	31,380	0.09%	27,320	0.09%	
Inuktitut	35,215	0.1%	33,500	0.1%	32,015	0.1%	In the 2006 Census, this language was referred to as 'Inuktitut, n.i.e.'.
Armenian	33,455	0.1%	29,795	0.09%	30,130	0.1%	
Turkish	32,815	0.09%	29,640	0.09%	24,745	0.08%	
Min Nan (Chaochow, Teochow, Fukien, Taiwanese)	31,795	0.09%	n/a	n/a	n/a	n/a	
Malayalam	28,570	0.08%	16,080	0.05%	11,925	0.04%	
Albanian	26,895	0.08%	23,820	0.07%	n/a	n/a	
Ilocano	26,345	0.08%	17,915	0.05%	13,450	0.04%	
Amharic	22,465	0.06%	18,020	0.05%	14,555	0.05%	
Czech	22,295	0.06%	23,585	0.07%	24,450	0.08%	
Khmer (Cambodian)	20,130	0.06%	19,440	0.06%	19,105	0.06%	
Bulgarian	20,020	0.06%	19,050	0.06%	16,790	0.05%	
Hebrew	19,530	0.06%	18,450	0.06%	17,635	0.06%	
Niger–Congo languages, n.i.e.	19,140	0.06%	14,075	0.04%	n/a	n/a	
Nepali	18,275	0.05%	8,480	0.03%	n/a	n/a	
Ojibway	17,885	0.05%	17,625	0.05%	24,190	0.08%	
Slovak	17,585	0.05%	17,580	0.05%	18,820	0.06%	
Pashto	16,910	0.05%	12,465	0.04%	9,025	0.03%	
Macedonian	16,770	0.05%	17,245	0.05%	18,435	0.06%	
Tigrigna	16,650	0.05%	10,220	0.03%	7,105	0.02%	
Sinhala	16,335	0.05%	14,185	0.04%	10,180	0.03%	
Bisayan languages	n/a	n/a	16,240	0.05%	11,240	0.04%	
Telugu	15,655	0.05%	9,315	0.03%	6,625	0.02%	
Finnish	15,295	0.04%	17,415	0.05%	21,030	0.07%	
Yiddish	13,555	0.04%	15,205	0.05%	16,295	0.05%	
Akan (Twi)	13,460	0.04%	12,680	0.04%	12,780	0.04%	
Swahili	13,375	0.04%	10,090	0.03%	7,935	0.03%	
Wu (Shanghainese)	12,920	0.04%	n/a	n/a	n/a	n/a	
Oji-Cree	12,855	0.04%	9,835	0.03%	11,690	0.04%	
Lao	12,670	0.04%	12,970	0.04%	13,940	0.04%	
Danish	12,630	0.04%	14,145	0.04%	18,735	0.06%	
Malay	12,275	0.04%	10,910	0.03%	9,490	0.03%	
Bosnian	12,210	0.04%	11,685	0.04%	12,790	0.04%	
Sindhi	11,860	0.03%	11,330	0.03%	10,355	0.03%	
Kurdish	11,705	0.03%	9,805	0.03%	7,660	0.02%	
Hakka	10,910	0.03%	5,115	0.02%	n/a	n/a	
Dene, n.o.s.	10,700	0.03%	11,215	0.03%	9,745	0.03%	
Afrikaans	10,260	0.03%	8,770	0.03%	n/a	n/a	
Montagnais (Innu)	10,230	0.03%	10,785	0.03%	10,975	0.04%	In the 2006 Census, this language was referred to as 'Montagnais-Naskapi'.
Slovenian	9,785	0.03%	10,775	0.03%	13,135	0.04%	
Taiwanese	n/a	n/a	9,635	0.03%	9,620	0.03%	
Serbo-Croatian	9,555	0.03%	10,155	0.03%	12,510	0.04%	All varieties of Serbo-Croatian (Bosnian, Croatian, Montenegrin and Serbian) combined would enumerate a total of 127,310 speakers (0.37% of total population).
African languages, n.i.e.	n/a	n/a	9,125	0.03%	n/a	n/a	
Thai	9,255	0.03%	7,935	0.02%	n/a	n/a	
Marathi	8,295	0.02%	5,830	0.02%	n/a	n/a	
Bantu languages, n.i.e.	n/a	n/a	7,150	0.02%	n/a	n/a	
Lithuanian	7,075	0.02%	7,245	0.02%	8,335	0.03%	
Swedish	6,840	0.02%	7,350	0.02%	8,220	0.03%	
Mi'kmaq	6,690	0.02%	7,635	0.02%	7,365	0.02%	
Tibetan	6,165	0.02%	n/a	n/a	n/a	n/a	
Atikamekw	6,150	0.02%	5,820	0.02%	5,250	0.02%	
Canadian Gaelic	n/a	n/a	6,015	0.02%	6,015	0.02%	
Fukien (Fuzhou dialect)	n/a	n/a	5,925	0.02%	n/a	n/a	
Rundi (Kirundi)	5,845	0.02%	3,975	0.01%	n/a	n/a	
Maltese	5,565	0.02%	6,220	0.02%	6,405	0.02%	
Estonian	5,445	0.02%	6,385	0.02%	8,240	0.03%	
Latvian	5,455	0.02%	6,200	0.02%	7,000	0.02%	
Kinyarwanda (Rwanda)	5,250	0.02%	3,895	0.01%	n/a	n/a	
Indo-Iranian languages, n.i.e.	5,180	0.01%	5,255	0.02%	n/a	n/a	
Oromo	4,960	0.01%	11,140	0.03%	n/a	n/a	
Norwegian	4,615	0.01%	5,800	0.02%	7,225	0.02%	
Tibetan languages	n/a	n/a	4,640	0.01%	n/a	n/a	
Sino-Tibetan languages, n.i.e.	n/a	n/a	4,360	0.01%	n/a	n/a	
Sign languages, n.i.e.	4,125	0.01%	3,815	0.01%	n/a	n/a	
Vlaams (Flemish)	3,895	0.01%	4,690	0.01%	5,660	0.02%	
Lingala	3,810	0.01%	3,085	0.01%	n/a	n/a	
Burmese	3,585	0.01%	2,985	0.01%	n/a	n/a	
Stoney	3,025	0.01%	3,050	0.01%	n/a	n/a	
Shanghainese	n/a	n/a	2,920	0.01%	n/a	n/a	
Blackfoot	2,815	<0.01%	n/a	n/a	3,085	0.01%	
Slavic languages, n.i.e.	2,420	0.01%	3,630	0.01%	n/a	n/a	
Semitic languages, n.i.e.	2,155	0.01%	16,970	0.05%	n/a	n/a	
Frisian	2,095	<0.01%	n/a	n/a	2,890	0.01%	
Dogrib (Tlicho)	1,645	<0.01%	n/a	n/a	2,020	0.01%	
Tibeto-Burman languages, n.i.e.	1,405	<0.01%	n/a	n/a	n/a	n/a	
Siouan languages (Dakota/Sioux)	1,265	<0.01%	n/a	n/a	5,585	0.02%	
Algonquin	1,260	<0.01%	n/a	n/a	1,920	0.01%	
Scottish Gaelic	1,095	<0.01%	n/a	n/a	n/a	n/a	
Welsh	1,075	<0.01%	n/a	n/a	n/a	n/a	
Carrier	1,030	<0.01%	n/a	n/a	1,560	<0.01%	
Inuinnaqtun (Inuvialuktun)	1,020	<0.01%	n/a	n/a	365	<0.01%	
Mohawk	985	<0.01%	n/a	n/a	290	<0.01%	
South Slavey	950	<0.01%	n/a	n/a	1,605	0.01%	Also known as Dene Yatıé or Dene Zhatıé, or Dené Dháh.
Gitxsan (Gitksan)	880	<0.01%	n/a	n/a	1,180	<0.01%	
North Slavey	765	<0.01%	n/a	n/a	1,065	<0.01%	Also known as Sahtúgot’įné Yatı̨́, K’ashógot’įne Goxedǝ́, and Shíhgot’įne Yatı̨́.
Tsilhqot'in	655	<0.01%	n/a	n/a	1,070	<0.01%	Also spelled Chilcotin.
Celtic languages, n.i.e.	530	<0.01%	n/a	n/a	n/a	n/a	
Dënësųłıné	n/a	n/a	n/a	n/a	525	<0.01%	
Michif	465	<0.01%	n/a	n/a	n/a	n/a	
Shuswap (Secwepemctsin)	445	<0.01%	n/a	n/a	935	<0.01%	
Nisga'a	400	<0.01%	n/a	n/a	680	<0.01%	
Malecite	300	<0.01%	n/a	n/a	535	<0.01%	
Kutchin-Gwich’in (Loucheux)	260	<0.01%	n/a	n/a	360	<0.01%	
Tlingit	95	<0.01%	n/a	n/a	80	<0.01%	
Other languages	n/a	n/a	77,890	0.2%	172,650	0.55%	
Multiple language responses	818,640	2.35%	639,540	1.9%	392,760	1.26%	
English and French	165,335	0.48%	144,685	0.4%	98,630	0.32%	
English and a non-official language	533,260	1.53%	396,330	1.2%	240,005	0.77%	
French and a non-official language	86,145	0.25%	74,430	0.2%	43,335	0.14%	
English, French, and a non-official language	33,900	0.1%	24,095	0.07%	10,790	0.03%	
Total	34,767,250	100%	33,121,175	100%	31,241,030	100%	

== Prose used most often in settings ==
Language used most often among total population
	At work		At home	
Language	2006	2016	2006	2016
English	76.36%	76.49%	65.89%	63.75%
French	20.22%	19.17%	21.15%	19.97%
Non-official	1.49%	1.38%	11.11%	11.5%
English and French	1.37%	2.07%	1.3%	3.7%
English and non-official	0.47%	0.77%	0.3%	0.46%
Other (Note: French and non-official language OR English, French and non-official language)	0.09%	0.12%	0.24%	0.63%

== See also ==
- Demographics of Canada
- Immigration to Canada
- Franco-Albertans
- Franco-Columbian
- Franco-Manitoban
- Franco-Ontarian
- Fransaskois
- Franco-Ténois
- Franco-Newfoundlander
- Franco-Yukonnais
- Quebec English
- Quebec French
- Newfoundland French
- Italian language in Canada
