= English Canada =

English-speaking population of Canada

Approximately 98 percent of Canadians can speak either or both English and French: English – 56.9% English and French – 16.1% French – 21.3% Sparsely populated area ( < 0.4 persons per km^{2})

English Canada, also known as Anglophone Canada, Canada outside Quebec or The Rest of Canada (TROC), refers to the geographic region of Canada where English is the de facto and de jure language, as opposed to the French language. While English and French are both official languages in Canada, the country's English-speaking society constitutes the linguistic majority in every Canadian province and territory except for Quebec.

== Context ==
=== Linguistics ===
Linguistically, the terms describe all the provinces of Canada that have an anglophone majority. This is every province except Quebec. When used in this way, English Canada is often referred to as the "ROC" (rest of Canada). This type of usage excludes French-speaking areas in English-majority provinces like the East and North of New Brunswick, Northern and Eastern Ontario, Saint-Boniface and the few small pockets of French localities in Western Canada. It also excludes areas where a third language is widely spoken, such as German, Russian or First Nations languages.

When discussing the culture, values and lifestyles of English-speaking Canadians as opposed to those of French-speaking Canadians, this usage is most often employed to compare English- and French-language literature, media, art and institutions.

=== Demographics ===
When discussing the Two Solitudes, English Canada (i.e. the anglophones of Canada; or British Canada) is one of two founding nations of Canada along with French Canada (i.e. the francophones of Canada), and in which these two societies share a country but rarely communicate with each other. The term was often used during the conscription crisis. The population whose native language is neither English nor French are often included into one of the two official languages or are classified as allophones.

English Canadians, in some contexts, refers to Canadians who have origins in England, in contrast to French Canadians, Scottish Canadians, Irish Canadians, etc.

== See also ==
- French Canada
- Demolinguistic descriptors used in Canada
  - Anglophone, meaning someone who speaks English as their first language
  - Francophone, meaning someone who speaks French as their first language
  - Allophone, meaning someone whose first language is neither English nor French
- Official bilingualism in Canada, since 1969
