= Demolinguistic descriptors used in Canada =

A number of demolinguistic descriptors are used by Canadian federal and provincial government agencies, including Statistics Canada, the Commissioner of Official Languages, the Office québécois de la langue française to assist in accurately measuring the status of the country’s two official languages and its many non-official languages. This page provides definitions of these descriptors, and also records where and for how long each descriptor has been in use.

== Descriptors used in the census (primary descriptors) ==
=== "First official language spoken" ===
This measure is based on: first, knowledge of the two official languages: second, mother tongue; and third, the home language (i.e., the language spoken most often at home). The first official language spoken may be: English only, French only, both English and French, or neither English nor French. Data for this descriptor were first collected in the census of 1986.

=== "Home language" ===
Home language is the language most often spoken at home at the time of the census. Because some couples have different mother tongues, the census allows individuals to indicate that they speak more than one language at home. Persons who live alone may not speak at all in the privacy of their own homes, so the census asks such individuals to identify the language in which they feel most comfortable. Data for this descriptor were first collected in the census of 1971.

Inclusion of a question along these lines was recommended in the report of the Royal Commission on Bilingualism and Biculturalism, which highlighted the shortcomings of the mother tongue measure:

In answering the [census] question on mother tongue…Swedish or German immigrants, for example, would have to reply their whole lives long that German or Swedish is their mother tongue, even if they presently speak English almost exclusively. The same may be true for Canadians whose parents are of an ethnic group other than French or English, and even for Canadians whose mother tongue is French. In such cases—and we know they are numerous—the information concerning the mother tongue of the individual does not tell us which language he most commonly uses. The information is a generation behind the facts.

On this basis, the commissioners made the following additional statement: "If a question on the language generally used is added to the census—and if the data gained from the responses to this question are considered valid—we think this should be used as a basis for future calculations [as to where services ought to be offered in which language]."

=== "Knowledge of Official Languages" ===
This measure describes which of the two official languages of Canada a person can speak. In Canada, knowledge of both official languages is referred to as "bilingualism", even though bilingualism can technically mean a knowledge of any two languages. This descriptor relies on the census respondent’s own evaluation of his/her linguistic competence. Some people claim that this reliance on each Canadian’s subjective opinion leads to over-reporting of bilingualism, because many people with only a limited ability to speak the other official language record themselves as having a knowledge of both official languages. As well, levels of knowledge have been shown to change dramatically within the same age cohort over time. (For example, there is a significant decline in knowledge of French among English-speaking Canadians in the decade after they graduate from high school.) Data for this descriptor were first collected in the census of 1931.

=== "Language used most often at work" ===
This is the language used most often by the respondent in carrying out job functions at his or her place of employment during the week prior to the census. In the case of persons not currently working, the language used most often during the longest period of employment in the year preceding the census. This question is only asked of persons over the age of fifteen. Data for this descriptor were first collected in the census of 2001.

=== "Mother tongue" ===
Mother tongue is defined by Statistics Canada as the "first language learned at home during childhood and still understood by the individual at the time of the census." Because some children are born into marriages between parents who use different languages in the home, the census allows individuals to indicate multiple mother tongues. Data for this descriptor were first collected in the census of 1931.

== Descriptors derived from the primary descriptors ==
=== "Language Continuity Index" ===
This index has been used by the Office of the Commissioner of Official Languages to determine the health of French-language minority populations outside Quebec. The index "represents the relation between the number of persons speaking French most often at home and the number of persons for whom French is the mother tongue. A continuity index of less than 1 means that French registers more losses than gains in its exchanges with other languages." The exact number reveals the percentage of the French-language population (as measured by mother tongue) that continues to use French as its home language. The remainder of this population now uses English as its preferred language in the home, which is a strong indicator of assimilation.

Although the Commissioner has not used the index for other purposes, it could presumably be used the same way for any language group within any province.

This descriptor is calculated using data on mother tongue and home language, which were first collected in the census of 1971. Therefore it is possible to calculate statistics for this descriptor from that date forward.

=== "Official language minority" ===
French is the majority language in Quebec; English is the majority language in the other nine provinces, Yukon, and the Northwest Territories; and Inuktitut is the majority language in Nunavut, but among its minority languages English-speakers outnumber French-speakers. Therefore, English-speakers are the official language minority population in Quebec and French-speakers are the official language minority populations in the territories and other provinces. This descriptor is used by the Canadian government to define English- and French-speaking communities in order to gauge demand for minority language services in a province/territory or a region within a province/territory. Sometimes, home language is used to determine the size of an official language minority, and sometimes mother tongue is used.
