= Inuit Sign Language =

Indigenous sign language isolate

Inuit Sign Language (IUR) ᐃᓄᐃᑦ ᐆᒃᑐᕋᐅᓯᖏᑦ Inuit Uukturausingit
- ᐃᓄᐃᑦ ᐆᒃᑐᐊᕋᐅᓯᖅ Inuit Uuktuarausiq (also: ᐊᑦᒐᖕᒨᕐᖕᓂᖅ Atgangmuurngniq)
- Native to: Canada, possibly Greenland
- Region: Nunavut
- Ethnicity: Inuit
- Native speakers: >47 Deaf in Nunavut (2000 (2000 data, 2014 pub.)); Unknown additional hearing speakers
- Language family: Language isolate

Official status
- Recognised minority language in: Interpreted alongside ASL in the Legislative Assembly of Nunavut.

Language codes
- ISO 639-3: iks
- Glottolog: inui1247
- ELP: Inuit Sign Language
- Map of Inuit (IUR) and Greenlandic Sign Languages

Inuit Sign Language (IUR; Inuktitut: ᐃᓄᐃᑦ ᐆᒃᑐᕋᐅᓯᖏᑦ, romanized: Inuit Uukturausingit) is one of the Inuit languages and the indigenous sign language of Inuit. It is a language isolate native to Inuit communities in the Canadian Arctic. It is currently only attested within certain communities in Nunavut, particularly Baker Lake and Rankin Inlet. Although there is a possibility that it may be used in other places where Inuit live in the Arctic, this has not been confirmed.

Of the estimated 155 deaf residents of Nunavut in 2000, around 47 were thought to use IUR, while the rest use American Sign Language (ASL) due to schooling. It is unknown how many hearing people use the language nor how many people are monolingual. As it is a highly endangered and relatively hidden language, it has no protection under the federal or territorial governments of Canada. However, IUR exists alongside ASL interpretation within the Legislative Assembly of Nunavut as of 2008. Recently, there has been increased interest in the documentation of the language which would be done through the Nunavut Council for People with Disabilities and the Inuit Broadcasting Corporation (IBC). As well, there is a push to expand the interpretation/translation programme through Arctic College to include IUR.

== Etymology ==
Within Academia and the wider majority community, little is known about Inuit Sign Language, Greenlandic Sign Language, nor about other manual languages of the Inuit. One way to broadly refer to Inuit sign languages is by using:

- ᐃᓄᐃᑦ ᐆᒃᑐᕋᐅᓯᖏᑦ Inuit Uukturausingit
- ᐃᓄᐃᑦ ᐆᒃᑐᐊᕋᐅᓯᖅ Inuit Uuktuarausiq
- ᐊᑦᒐᖕᒨᕐᖕᓂᖅ Atgangmuurngniq

However, each linguistic community has its own term for sign language:

- Inuktitut: ᐆᒃᑐᕋᖅ, romanized: Uukturaq
- Inuinnaqtun: ᑎᑯᕋᖅ, romanized: Tikuraq
- Inuvialuktun: Ujjiqsuuraq
- Iñupiatun: Urraaraq
- Kalaallisut: Ussersuut, Ussersuataarneq

However, Ussersuut may refer instead to Greenlandic dialect of Danish Sign Language (also known as Grønlandsk Tegnsprog).

Similarly, other related peoples also refer to "sign language" as:

- Yugtun: Unaatekun Qalarcaraq
- Sugt’stun: Lliicaarciq
- Unangam Tunuu: Chuguusal / Chaasal

== History ==
At least since the 18th century, hearing Inuit used some form of sign language for trade and communication among various Inuit languages, a similar role to that played by Plains Indian Sign Language further south. Inuit Sign Language's origins could be dated back to when Inuit were living a nomadic lifestyle. They created the language to be more successful in hunting seasons. However, as more children were born deaf in the area, the language was revived and adapted to their needs. The earliest dated account of this language in use is Mallet (1930). This may have been IUR or at least its ancestor, as the region has a high incidence of congenital deafness. In the territory of Nunavut, for example, the incidence of hereditary deafness is six times that of southern Canada. The deaf are well integrated in the community, and there are perhaps two hearing people proficient in IUR for every deaf speaker, as in other communities with high rates of congenital deafness such as Martha's Vineyard. However, IUR is not (or no longer) used as a contact language among the hearing. (Note: According to Schuit (2012). MacDougall (2000) reports that hearing people have been observed using it for inter-dialectical communication, noting that "this is not unusual for nomadic hunters and others living in isolated places". However, it is not clear if he is referring to historical or contemporary accounts.) Its users are the deaf and those hearing people they regularly communicate with.

The history of the language is not well known, with stories passed down from elders noting the use of IUR, or related languages/dialects therein, for generations where the language(s) would be used by both hearing and deaf Inuit, especially out on the tundra. However, due to the sparseness of communities and the relative youth of the field of research, there is little understanding of who uses the language where. That being said, IUR has been shown to be passed down in some families through generations, regardless of deafness. In fact, deafness within Inuit society holds less stigma than it does within its southern neighbours which leads to a wider acceptance and adoption of IUR.

== Status ==
Inuit Sign Language is a threatened language. A decline in use is in progress due to a variety of reasons, chief of which is the encroachment of ASL. As there exists no formal educational opportunities using IUR, parents are increasingly opting to send their children south to schools where ASL is the primary language of instruction or English–ASL interpreted curriculum; Quebec Sign Language (LSQ) and/or French education appears to not hold precedence. Therefore, there is no formal alphabet for IUR. This trend is seen in the fact that an estimated third of the population (47 in c. 2000) use IUR as their native language. It is unknown the status of the language, though, outside of select communities within Nunavut.

Efforts to protect and document the language are underway. Increasingly, there is support from within and outside the linguistic community to expand local programmes and to document IUR, especially after R. v. Suwarak, 1999, which saw an Inuk man put to trial where no interpreter was able to be provided as none existed. Through the Nunavut Department of Culture, Language, Elders and Youth (CLEY) and the Department of Justice, Dr Jamie MacDougall is spearheading a project with community members to document and revitalize the language.

Officially, Inuit Sign Language is offered no rights or protections beyond what is found in the Canadian Charter of Rights and Freedoms, meaning no province or territory has established it as an official language. However, alongside ASL, interpreters have used IUR at Nunavut's legislative assembly since 2008.

== Varieties ==
As academic research into IUR is a new field, there is limited information related to its varieties. However, it is known that there is dialectal variation of the language across at least Nunavut, as to be expected from separated linguistic communities. It is reported that a sign language of Greenland is closely related to IUR with ASL and Danish Sign Language loans, but it is yet to be determined whether that is valid as Greenlandic Sign Language may be a variety or related to Danish Sign Language itself.

Beyond dialectal variation, there is little known of the range of the language or whether not there are multiple languages that exist. It is said that Inuit have spoken IUR, or at least a variation therein, for generations across much of their territories, however no current research confirms those rumours. As such, IUR is unattested to the west of Nunavut.

== Phonology ==
33 different handshapes have been identified.

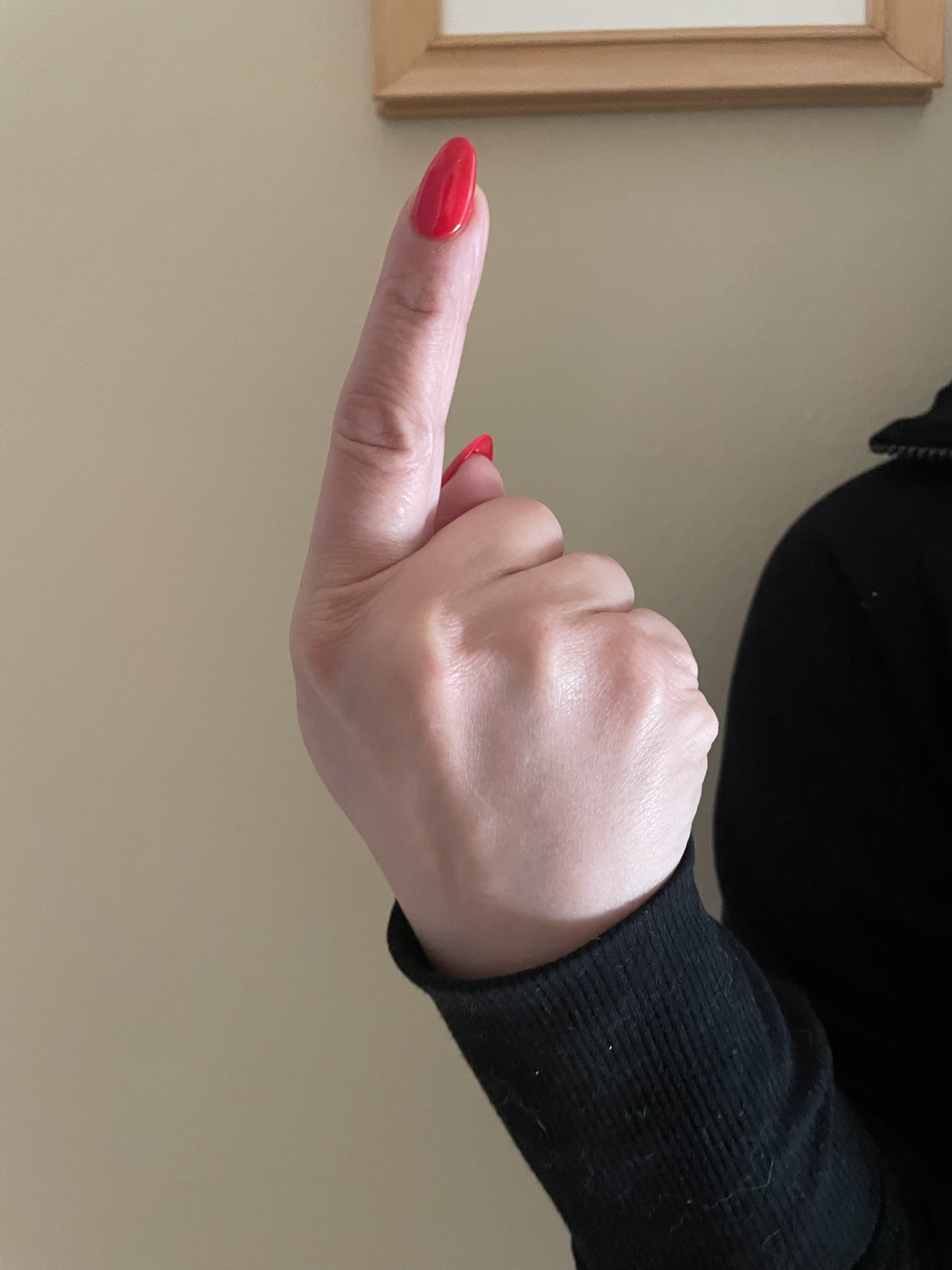
The index finger was used

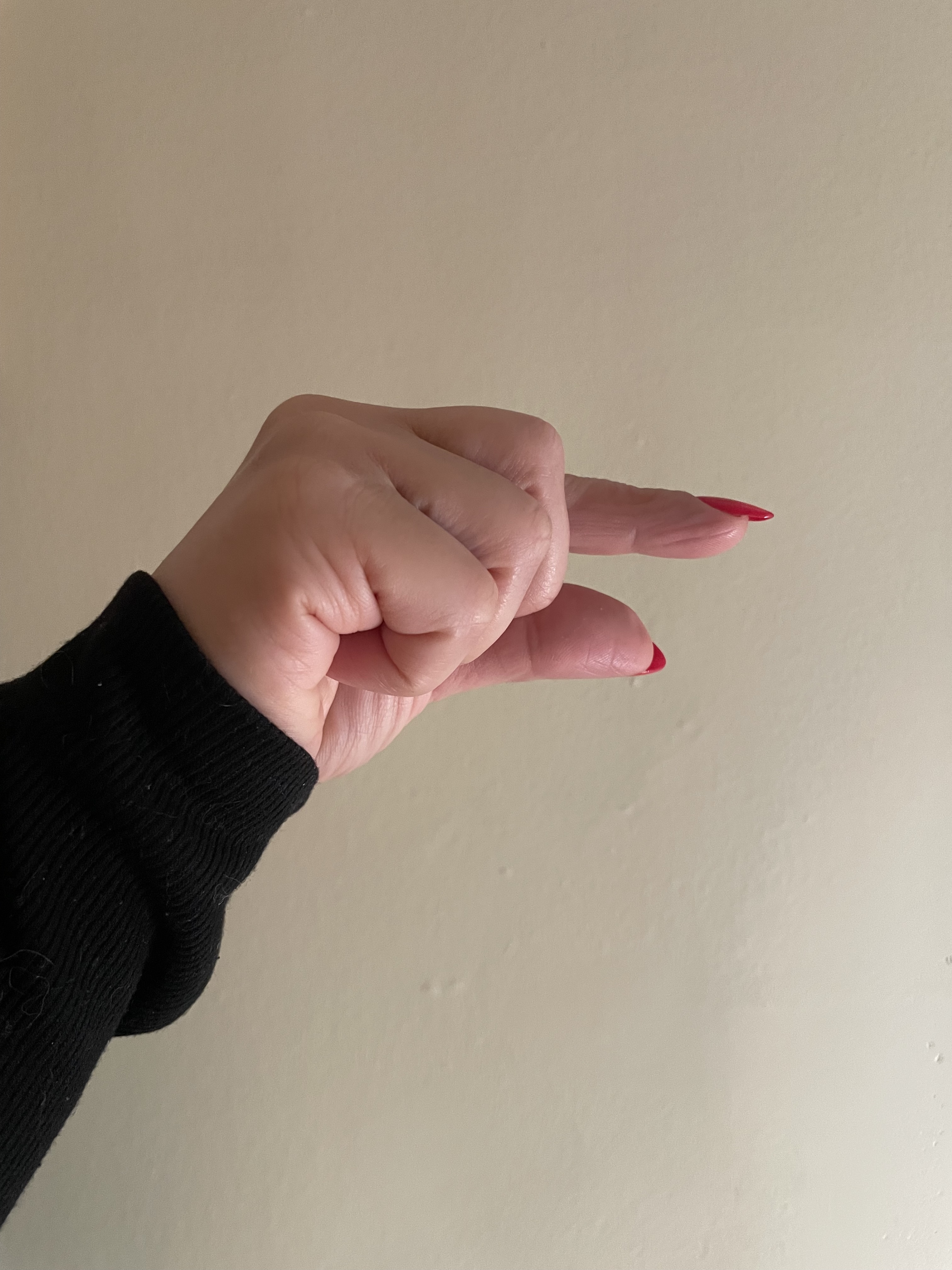
Selecting the index finger and thumb, opening or closing the non-selected fingers

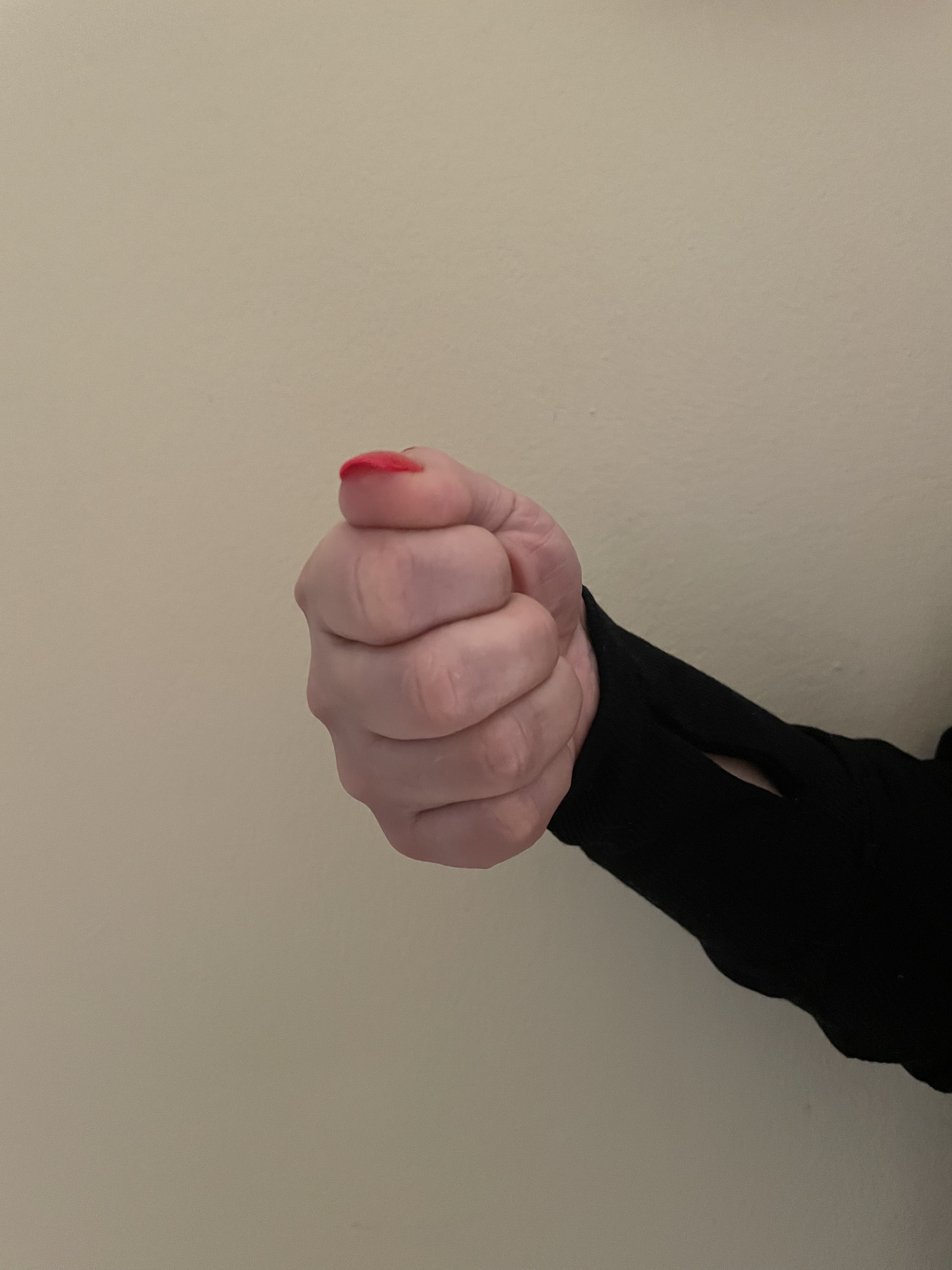
All fingers are closed and possibly only the thumb is selected

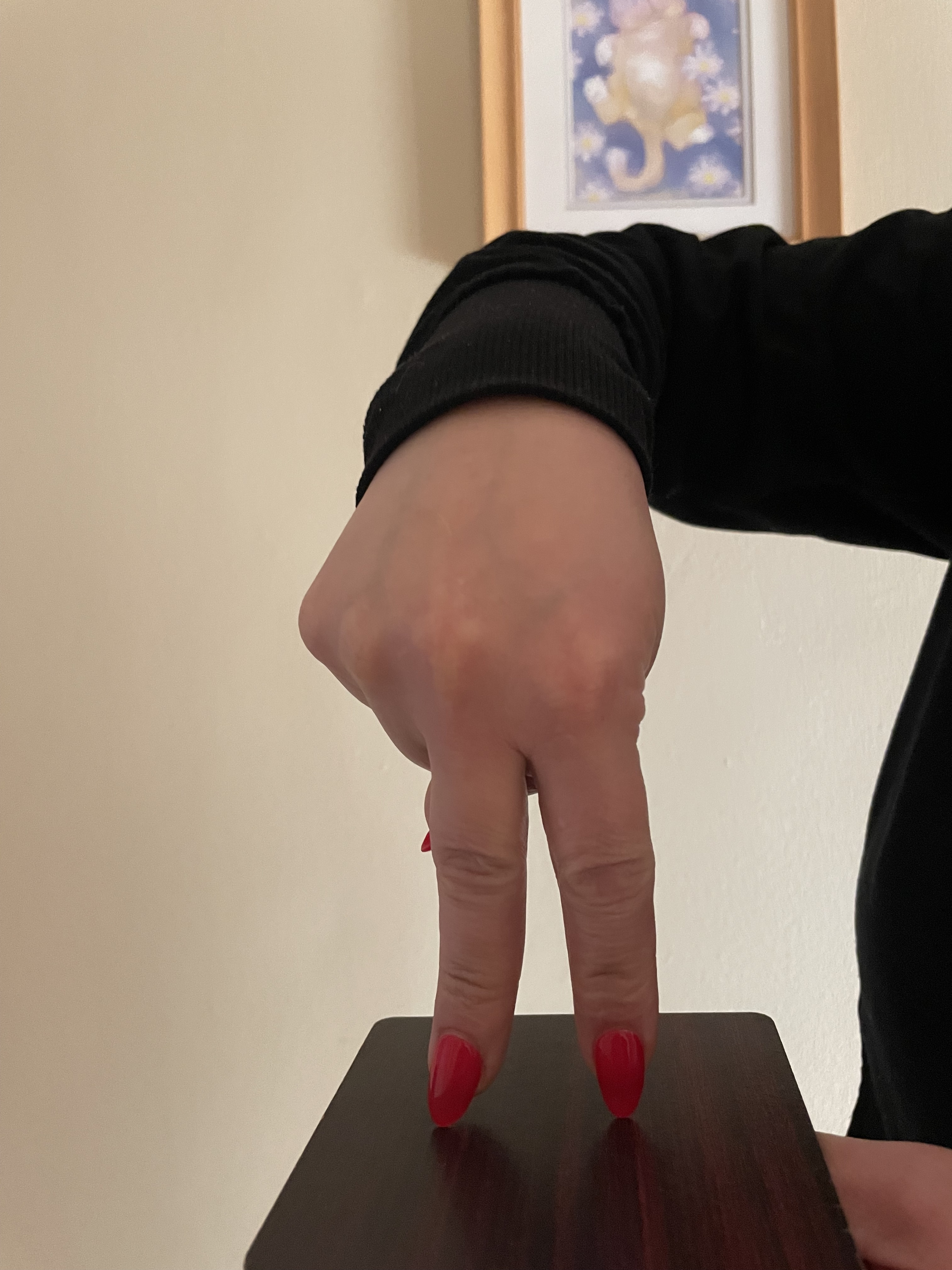
Selected with the index and middle fingers

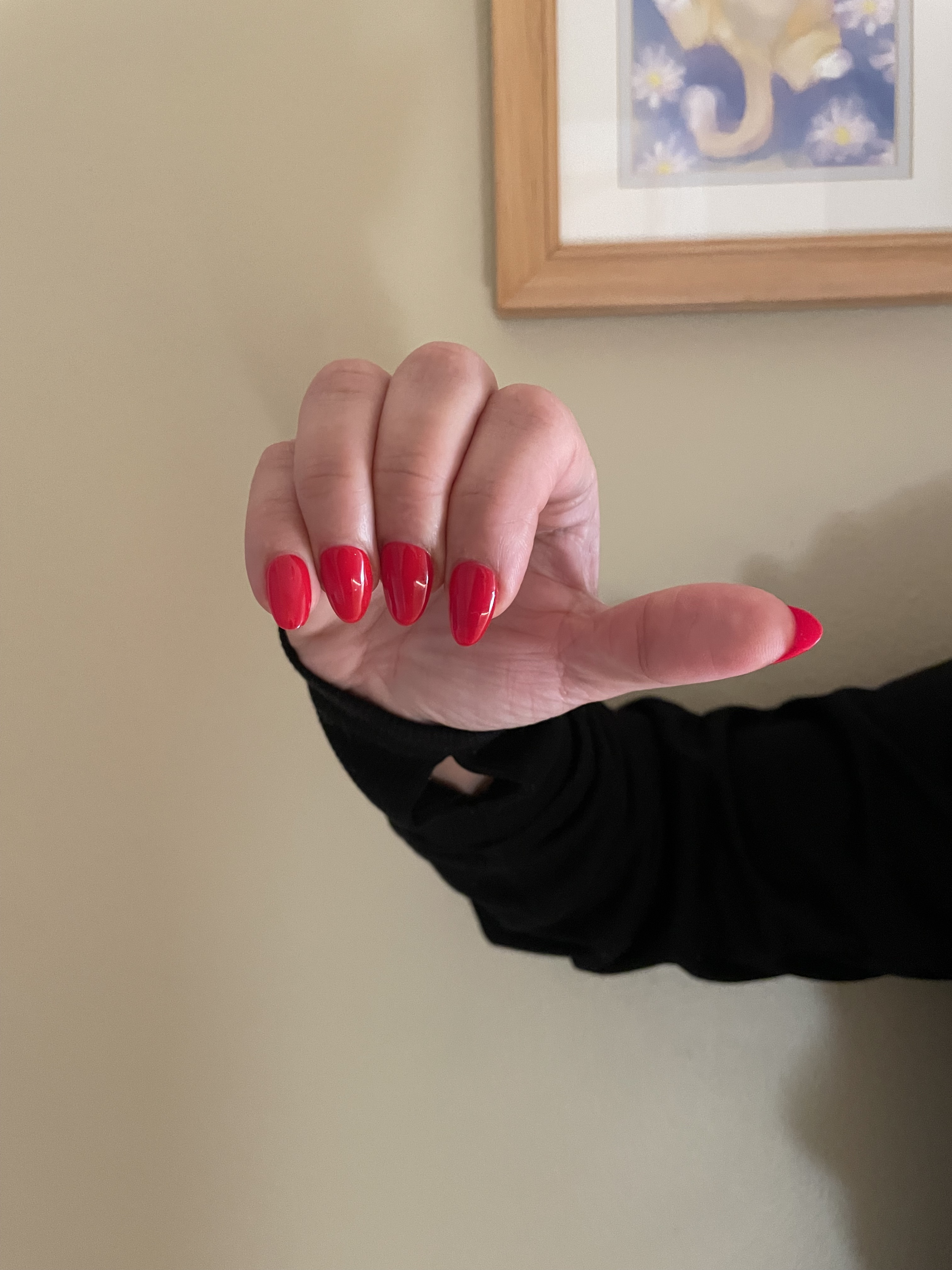
Selecting and bending each finger

== Grammar ==
As of 2015, there have been few linguistic studies on Inuit Sign Language, notably done by Schuit (2012) wherein they looked primarily at verb agreement and classifier use. Schuit makes note that at this early stage of research, they cannot say the absolute word order of the language; they plan to pursue further studies in negation and morphological typology later. So far, there have been 33 recognized phonetic hand shapes. Moreover, preliminary findings dictate that Inuit Sign Language does not exhibit a large amount of non-manual simultaneity, but that manual simultaneity certainly exists. As well, there exists limited verb agreement within the language, but all types of verbs found in sign languages (plain, agreement and spatial) can be found in Inuit Sign Language. One type of sign is a monomorphemic sign-usually consisting of one significant point of articulation and one or other movement. Finally, Inuit Sign Language appears to be not a subject-drop language but, rather, one that leaves the subject unspecified, which aligns similarly with Inuit culture.

=== Morphology ===
There are four types of methods for expressing the plural in noun morphology.

First, sign language near the body (body-anchored sign) has the same expression of plural and singular. It is possible to grasp the meaning in the context. However, arctic char, a type of fish, allows repetition as one exception.

Second, the complex sign that occurs in the neutral signing zone uses circular, alternating, and repetition to express the plural.

Third, the simple sign that occurs in the neutral signaling zone is divided into two-handed sign language on the medial sagittal plane and one-handed sign language on the side. Two-handed sign language is also divided into a balanced sign and an unbalanced sign. The balanced sign has the same position, shape, and movement of both hands. An unbalanced sign is when the movement of one hand is more dominant. The balanced sign uses zero plural markings, making it singular, and the plural has the same form, so the unbalanced sign is allowed to repeat.

Fourth, it is known that one-handed sign language uses repetition, but further studies are needed.

Personal names are communicated by signing the first letter of the written name while mouthing the name as well. The alphabet used to sign letters is derived from ASL.

=== Verb agreement ===
IUR exhibits a three-way distinction between plain, agreement and spatial verbs. In plain verbs, one sees no reference to an object or subject, such as the following example:

OTTAWA INDEX-LOC_{Ottawa} CALL–ON–PHONE LONG–AGO.
'Long ago, I phoned Ottawa.' (referring to a shop in Ottawa)

Although appearing to reference Ottawa, the verb, CALL–ON–PHONE, makes no movement nor orientation to suggest it agrees with the object. However, agreement can take the shape of varying executions in different spaces, such as with:

USE–ICE–AUGER_{1} INDEX_{3a} USE–ICE–AUGER_{3a} INDEX_{3a}
'I use an ice auger, and so does he.'

Here, the verb's location and movement shifts to agree with the subject of either clause. Additionally, agreement can be seen on transitive verbs such as the following where the verb SEE interacts only with its object. Verbs agreeing with both subject and object are rare.

INDEX_{1} COMMUNICATE INDEX_{3a} SEE_{3b} INDEX_{3b} PAY–ATTENTION
'I tell him to watch this (the fishing), to pay attention.'

Finally, IUR also uses spatial verbs with certain locative agreements. Some verbs set up a specific signing space in front of the signer whereas others use the index finger to locate absolutely a geographical point (also seen in the first example with OTTAWA) as seen in the following two examples:

INDEX–LOC_{3a} SCOOP DRILL–HOLE–WITH–AUGER FINISH. _{3a}WALK_{1} TAKE LONG–ITEM _{1}WALK_{3a} WHITE–MAN CHISEL_{V}. DROP LONG–THIN–OBJECT MOVES–BELOW–SURFACE
'Over there they started a hole with a scoop, and then drilled it with an ice-auger. Someone walked from there towards me and took my chisel. The white man walked back (to the hole) and used the chisel. Then he dropped it, and it went all the way to the bottom (of the sea).'

NEXT–DAY NEXT–DAY _{3a}PLANE–FLY_{3b}. WINNIPEG INDEX–LOC_{Winnipeg} _{W'peg}PLANE–FLY–WITH–STOPS_{1} HERE
'In two days, they take a plane that flies them to Winnipeg, followed by the plane from Winnipeg, that flies with some stops to here (Rankin Inlet).'

Spatial localization, however, is not obligatory, as seen here:

WHITE–MAN INUK INDEX_{1} MOVE–CL_{two-vehicles} SNOW–MOBILE GO_{3a}
'A white man and me, an Inuk, go by snow mobile (to Landing Lake).'

Here, the location remains unspecified even though it was known.

=== Geolocative ===
One unique feature of IUR is its absolute referents when referencing geographic locations. As in most other sign languages, signers will make a signing location in front of their body to indicate notions like 'here' or referencing a person abstractly. However, for geographic points, IUR references those locations absolutely using the index finger in the case of INDEX–LOC or other handshapes as is the case for _{Winnipeg}PLANE–FLY–WITH–STOPS_{1}. The actual locations vary from local, nearby villages or cities to cities such as Winnipeg that are thousands of kilometres away. However far the referent is, the signer will invariably point or indicate the direction in which it is.

=== Classifiers ===
IUR has both handling and entity classifiers as in many other sign languages. Its handling classifiers appear on transitive verbs and mark the direct object, such as PICK–UP:CL_{egg} ('pick up an egg') or MOVE_{up}:CL_{box} ('move a box'). Entity classifiers have so far been identified in the semantic class of vehicles, animals, two-legged beings and flying birds, such as in:

TWO THREE THREE-WEEKS WARM MOVE_{3a}:CL_{birds} GOOSE SHOOT++_{3a}
'In two or three weeks, when it’s warmer, the geese will come flying in, and I'll shoot them (out of the air).'

Handling classifiers are used more frequently.
