= Deafness in Francophone Canada =

There are about 357,000 deaf and 3,210,000 hard-of-hearing people in Canada. The country can be split into Francophone and Anglophone regions, and has both French and English as official languages. The majority of Canada is considered Anglophone, while the province of Quebec along with small parts of New Brunswick, Ontario, and Manitoba are primarily French-speaking. The presence of these two main languages and cultures also brings forth different deaf cultures between the two regions. In Francophone regions, the official language used by deaf and hard-of-hearing people is Quebec Sign Language (Langue des signes québécoise; LSQ).

== Language ==
Quebec Sign Language (Langue des signes québécoise; LSQ) is the sign language used by deaf people in the Francophone regions of Canada and is unique to the region. Akin to the contrasts between European French and Canadian French, differences are also present between French Sign Language and LSQ. Much of LSQ originated from American Sign Language (ASL) and French Sign Language (LSF).

Sign language was introduced to Quebec through religious groups promoting the education of deaf children. The Clerics of Saint Viator (Clercs de Saint-Viateur) brought LSF and teaching techniques from France while the Sisters of Providence (Soeurs de la Providence), having trained in the United States, brought ASL. These two influences combined to create Quebec Sign Language. LSQ is only used by deaf communities in Quebec, making it a deaf-community sign language. LSQ is considered a small language with fewer than 10,000 users and is reported to be stable.

== Organizations ==
The Canadian Association of the Deaf (Association des sourds du Canada; CAD) advocates for deaf people in the country. The CAD represents both the French-speaking and English-speaking regions of Canada. The organization believes that sign language deserves the same recognition as any other language. The CAD opposes communication forms created by non-deaf people, like seeing exact English, signed English, cued speech, and manually coded English, which they say "deform the true sign language in order to make it conform to the grammar and syntax of a verbal language".

Audition Québec, which specifically targets the French region of Canada, offers referral services and information for hard-of-hearing and deaf adults, as well as resources for the people around them. Audition Québec is funded by the Office des personnes handicapées du Québec and the Fondation des Sourds du Québec (Deaf Foundation of Quebec).

L'Association des personnes avec une déficience de l'audition (Association of People with Hearing Deficiency; APDA) is a non-profit organization focused on helping people live with hearing loss. They target people of all ages with hearing impairments but have a focus on senior citizens. The APDA offers support, mutual aid, information, and references. The APDA aims to help people with hearing loss integrate better into society and promotes their social inclusion. The APDA also raises awareness for the problems facing deaf and hard of hearing people and advocates for the rights of deaf people.

== Human and civil rights ==
In Quebec, LSQ is not an officially recognized language. The Charter of the French Language prohibits and seeks to limit the use of any language other than French, including LSQ. Despite persistent efforts to include ASL and LSQ in the Charter of French Language, no action has been taken to recognize the status of sign languages in Quebec. There is further action being taken to ensure the importance of French in Quebec with plans to make modifications to the Charter of French Language through Bill 96. The goal of Bill 96 is to guarantee that French is the only official language in Quebec; this is a rising concern in the deaf and hard-of-hearing community. Due to lack of recognition by the Quebec government, it is difficult for LSQ-using deaf individuals to access provincially legislated resources such as higher education, employment, and healthcare.

The Convention on the Rights of Persons with Disabilities (CRPD) is a United Nations treaty intended to protect the rights of disabled people. Canada ratified the CRPD in 2010 and is up to date with the reports, most recently publishing one in 2017.

== Education ==
The academic system for the deaf in Quebec has steered towards integrating students towards the hearing academic system. The three most-prominent schools for the deaf in Quebec dismiss the presence of sign language and focus on acquisition of spoken language for deaf children. Many teachers of the deaf in Quebec know sign language as a second language, and lack the fluency that a deaf person may have.

=== École Oraliste ===
École Oraliste is a Quebec City school that is centered towards preparing deaf children to enter a world of spoken language. The language of instruction is French and this institution believes that in order for deaf children to be successful in the world, they must be proficient in oral and written language. École Oraliste offers programs at the primary and secondary level.

=== MacKay School for the Deaf ===
The MacKay School for the Deaf is provincial school in Montreal. It serves students aged 4–21 who are deaf and hard-of-hearing, have physical disabilities, or have communication disorders. They have also implemented a reverse integration program in which hearing children aged 4–11 join the school and are taught alongside deaf and physically disabled children. Students in the reverse integration program must have English eligibility and live in the boundaries of the English Montreal School Board.

=== Montreal Oral School for the Deaf ===
The Montreal Oral School for the Deaf (MOSD) is a private school focused on providing an auditory-verbal education for children with hearing loss. Their purpose is to aid in developing a child's listening and spoken language skills, and they base their practices on principles set forth by the Alexander Graham Bell Academy. Targeted towards children aged 6–12 years old, this school aims to combat the language delay that is often faced by deaf children and integrate them into mainstream schools. In accordance with the objectives of the Quebec Education Program, MOSD offers special literary classes and audiology services to ensure that the child's spoken language skills parallel those of their hearing peers. MOSD also offers support services for deaf and hard-of-hearing children of all ages, including early intervention services for children aged 0–3. MOSD reports that 80% of its graduates move onto post secondary education.

=== Higher education ===
Deaf students in Quebec are able to access higher educations through support services like interpreters and notetakers, but there is not a post-secondary institution specialized towards deaf individuals. Vocational training is also offered in cities to those who have special needs, including those who are deaf. In post-secondary and adult training programs for the deaf, ASL is the primary sign language used throughout Canada, especially with the bilingual–bicultural education approach.

== Employment ==
In Quebec, 90% of deaf people are unemployed or on social assistance. There are many barriers regarding employment for deaf people in Quebec. In 2016, the Canadian Hearing Society published that the Quebec's auto insurer, Société de l'assurance automobile du Québec, would not allow deaf drivers to obtain a Class 4C licence, which is a prerequisite to employment for taxi, limousine, and rideshare drivers.

== Healthcare ==
The 1997 case Eldridge v British Columbia (AG) established that healthcare facilities in Canada are required to have interpreting services for deaf individuals. The remedies have not been widely implemented. Deaf people in Canada are often denied interpreters or misdiagnosed with other disabilities, such as intellectual disabilities, leading to a lack of informed consent in their own healthcare. There is a concern among deaf patients regarding medication safety and other medical risks, due to inadequate communication between medical professionals and deaf patients. Because of a lack of accessible telephone devices, deaf patients may struggle to contact doctors' offices, which may lead to delayed care or a lack of routine care.

For those in more rural areas of Quebec, it is very difficult to access an interpreter. Health organizations in more remote areas may require the deaf to pay for the interpreter themself. Deaf patients are then left to either pay for their own interpreter, have friends or family help with interpreting, or communicate in some other way. Deaf patients in Quebec also have trouble expressing their symptoms and problems due to a lack of vocabulary that covers their symptoms. Due to a lack of knowledge about issues like mental health and AIDS, deaf people may not recognize their problems as medical concerns.

For children under the age of 11, hearing aids are covered under the Quebec Health Insurance Plan if the hearing loss hinders full speech capacity and language development. Eligibility is determined after extensive testing to measure the extent and level of hearing loss.

=== Early detection and intervention ===
In Canada, early hearing detection and intervention is a responsibility of each province or territory, as it falls under the healthcare sector. There is no national mandate put out by the government of Canada to regulate newborn hearing screening and early intervention. Early hearing intervention services in Quebec are only available at specialized centers and hospitals spread throughout the province.

Quebec planned to implement universal screening by the end of 2013. In 2014, Quebec's early hearing detection and intervention efforts were graded as insufficient by the Canadian Infant Hearing Task Force. As of 2022, only 53% of infants born in Quebec were screened for hearing, compared to 97% in British Columbia and 94% in Ontario. This was an increase from the 2020 estimate of about 30% of Quebec infants receiving hearing screening.

The Health and Social Service Department of Quebec states that without newborn hearing screening, hearing loss is only detected after a child is two years old. The time period from 1 to 3 years is crucial for language acquisition; it is especially important for children to receive plentiful language input in the first year of life so that certain dimensions of language, such as syntax acquisition, develop properly. Children who are not screened for hearing loss at risk of language deprivation.

== See also ==
- Deaf life for Indigenous peoples in Canada
- Deafness in France
