= Deaf life for Indigenous peoples in Canada =

The Canadian Association of the Deaf estimates that there are over 350,000 Deaf Canadians, but there is not an exact number since there has never been a formal census on Deaf Canadians. There are approximately 1.2 million Indigenous people and over 750 reserves in Canada. There are various intersections of deaf and Indigenous culture, including valuing community, rooting their identity in their culture and its associated group instead of their individuality, having their identities oversimplified, being underrepresented in research and data collection, and experiencing health inequities due to their identities. There is limited research on Deaf Indigenous people, but the Saskatchewan Human Rights Association argues that issues faced by Deaf people are exacerbated when that person is also Indigenous.

== Language emergence ==
Indigenous sign languages in Canada include Coast Salish Sign Language (CSL), Plateau Sign Language, Inuit Sign Language (IUR), Oneida Sign Language (OSL), Plains Indian Sign Language (PiSL or PSL), and Secwepemc Sign Language. People with typical hearing in Indigenous communities have historically used sign languages to communicate with other tribes, communicate when speaking was not allowed or could be dangerous (e.g., times of mourning, while hunting), tell stories, and ensure that deaf members of their tribe could communicate. Only a few elders know Plateau Sign Language. IUR is used by people in the Canadian Arctic; an estimated 120 people know it (40 deaf, 80 hearing). Since the prevalence of deafness is higher in Inuit communities than non-Indigenous communities, it is believed that Inuit Sign Language was primarily developed out of necessity. Inuit Sign Language is a shared sign language. PSL, which originated from deaf people living on the Great Plains, is used by the Cree, Dakota, and Siksika. PSL is a shared sign language.

Oneida Sign Language combines Plains Indian Sign Language with the Oneida spoken language and was developed in 2016 by a Deaf Oneida member who wanted to provide deaf people with the opportunity to connect with their Indigenous culture.

American Sign Language and Quebec Sign Language are more commonly used and are putting Indigenous sign languages at risk, but people are working to preserve the Indigenous languages through workshops, videos, advocacy, and camps.

== Significant organizations ==
=== Canadian Association of the Deaf (CAD) ===
Founded in 1940, the Canadian Association of the Deaf (CAD) is a national organization that advocates for Deaf individuals by developing best practices for businesses and organizations, creating programs, distributing information, conducting research, offering a library and resource center on deafness, and providing their expertise on the experiences of Deaf people. Their board is made up of only Deaf people. They were created with the goal of providing scholarships for Deaf people but have since expanded to do many other things. They advocated for Deaf teachers to continue teaching and using ASL in classrooms in the 1940s and 50s. They used research studies to successfully advocate for Deaf education to continue after 10th grade. This also occurred in the 1950s. In the 1970s, they established a program that captioned movies and led to Canada creating and using captioned TV in 1981. In more recent years, CAD has employed over 500 Deaf Canadians, developed a training program to address illiteracy, and won legal battles to support and enhance the rights of Deaf people.

=== BC Hummingbird Society for the Deaf (BCHSD) ===
Formed in 2017, BCHSD collaborates with Deaf and Indigenous communities across Canada to build a sense of community and belonging for Indigenous Deaf people. Their Indigenous Sign Language (ISL) Council is made up of members from various tribes that all work together to preserve and protect ISL. They note in their report that they only know of one other organization doing work with Deaf Indigenous People, the Nunavut Deaf Society. The Nunavut Deaf Society does not have a website or social media page that could be found, but one news article reports that they are a volunteer organization doing advocacy work for Deaf People in Nunavut.

=== Canadian Hard of Hearing Association (CHHA) ===
The Canadian Hard of Hearing association was created in 1982 to empower people with hearing loss. They provide education, resources, and mentorship. Their website offers information about the science of hearing, what causes hearing loss and how to prevent it, resources that are available to people with hearing loss and their loved ones, how to advocate for yourself as someone that is hard of hearing, and technology that people can use to fix their hearing loss. Their free mentorship program connects people that are hard of hearing and provides them with the space to ask questions, gain social and emotional support, and better understand their condition.

=== Indigenous Services Canada (ISC) ===
Indigenous Services Canada is part of the Canadian government that collaborates with Indigenous partners to deliver services that are specifically tailored towards the needs of Indigenous populations. They have emergency management services, offer funding for healthcare and education, provide healthcare resources and services, work to improve housing and infrastructure on reserves, develop programs, and help Indigenous communities become more self-sufficient through economic, community, and government development.

== Human/Civil rights ==
Canada ratified the Convention on the Rights of Persons with Disabilities (CRPD) in 2010. As part of the CRPD, Canada is supposed to guarantee its deaf population the right to education, accessibility to facilities and services, freedom to express opinions and access information, and freedom to participate in cultural life. The Canadian Association of the Deaf argues that while the rights of deaf people are federally protected, they are still violated locally and internationally due to ignorance and the way the system is built. Indigenous Deaf people are more at risk for experiencing human rights violations due to their intersecting identities. The Saskatchewan Human Rights Commission (SHRC) conducted over 40 interviews to determine the extent of discrimination that was reported by various sources in 2014. From these interviews, they created a committee of people with lived experience and a report titled "Access and Equality for Deaf, deaf, and Hard of Hearing People: A Report to Stakeholders, which was released in 2016. This report outlined discrimination that deaf people experienced when trying to access healthcare, education, employment, and social services and made note of 15 issues that needed to be addressed in order to create a more equitable Canada. Their committee is working towards addressing these.

Development of the Accessible Canada Act (ACA) began in 2017 and was enacted in 2019 with the goal to remove barriers for people with disabilities in seven areas: employment; built environment; information and communication technologies (ICT); communication outside of ICT; programs and services; transportation; and obtainment of goods, services, and facilities. American Sign Language, Quebec Sign Language, and Indigenous Sign languages were recognized as the primary languages for Deaf Canadians in this Act. All government entities, banks, transportation systems, and law enforcement must follow the provisions of this act, enforced by the Accessibility Commissioner through reports, inspections, and violation notices. As part of this Act, Canada created an Accessibility Standards Development Organization to create voluntary standards of accessibility for organizations and other entities to follow. Most of this organization is made up of people with disabilities. As a final part of this Act, Canada declared the last Sunday in May as the beginning of National AccessAbility Week.

== Early hearing detection and prevention ==
The Canadian Association of the Deaf fully supports early hearing detection so that children can receive access to language as early as possible.

There is minimal data on hearing detection and interventions amongst Indigenous deaf children. This is due to many reasons, including limited access to healthcare resources, differences in cultural beliefs related to childhood development, and a lack of understanding from professionals. Though they did an extensive literature review, the Canadian Association of Speech-Language Pathologists and Audiologists were unable to gather information on hearing screening and service delivery for Indigenous children between 0–6 years of age throughout Canada.

Due to the rural location of many Indigenous communities in Canada, it is harder for the deaf population to access care related to their hearing health. In an attempt to combat this, Josée Lagacé and Véronique Vaillancourt created a hearing screening pilot project on Pikangikum First Nations Reserve in Ontario. They screened over 400 children at an elementary school and provided families with resources if their child tested outside of the typical hearing threshold. They hope that this project educated the community on hearing screening and highlighted this gap in services so that more people will work towards making hearing screening more accessible in rural areas.

The Hear the World Foundation and The Hearing Foundation of Canada are collaborating to improve the hearing health of Indigenous populations in Canada. These organizations focus on the prevention of hearing loss instead of people that are born deaf, but they are still working to identify hearing loss at an early age and provide people with resources in the case that a child does experience hearing loss. These two groups included Indigenous experts to identify barriers to hearing loss treatment and increase the trust in services provided.

== Primary and secondary education ==
In the past, deaf children and Indigenous children were both placed in residential schools, where they were forced to assimilate and give up their culture. Children in these schools were mistreated by staff members and many are still affected by the traumatic experiences they had. Most of the teachers were not deaf, but people recall the few deaf teachers also mistreating the Indigenous students. The cultural differences at these schools also impacted Indigenous children negatively. Students did not learn about Indigenous history and were forced to use English or ASL. Although residential schools can be harmful, they can also lead to better language and communication outcomes.

Today, deaf children rarely have access to preschool and are often included in typical classrooms with assistants. SHRC's committee supported the creation of two preschools for deaf children, but it is unclear whether these would be accessible to Indigenous children. In Dr. McKay-Cody's dissertation, she states that many Deaf Indigenous children do not have access to education. Even if they attend a mainstream school, they may be ignored by the teacher or not have access to an interpreter. Deaf education is often developed with white deaf students in mind and does not consider the cultural needs of Indigenous students. There are not many deaf teachers of color.

== Higher education ==
Indigenous students are able to receive government funding for school through the University and College Entrance Preparation Program and Post-Secondary Student Support Program. These programs work to make higher education more accessible and promote increase educational attainment in Indigenous populations.

Indigenous students who want to become interpreters sometimes drop out because of the lack of cultural awareness in Interpreter Training Programs. There is also a lack of role models for Indigenous Deaf students to look up to, which can make their journey through higher education more difficult. In response to the Indigenous Languages Act, people requested that post-secondary institutions have degrees available in Indigenous languages. The Canadian government responded by saying this would be up to the institutions themselves to create.

== Healthcare ==
The Canadian Association of the Deaf reports that hospitals lack interpreters, deaf doctors that understand the particular issues that DHH people face, visual alarm systems, closed captions that would allow DHH patients to understand what is on the TV, and technology that would allow DHH patients to schedule appointments over the phone. The Supreme Court declared in Eldridge v British Columbia (AG) (1997) that any healthcare facility that receives federal funding must provide accessible services and goods to people who are deaf, hard of hearing, or handicapped in some other way. However, this rule is not being implemented in every territory, and it only applies to government-funded healthcare services and locations, not private healthcare providers. To combat healthcare resources not being accessible, the Canadian Association of the Deaf developed the "Open Up!" program, providing accessible health information to everyone: deaf people, people who speak English or French, or people who have disabilities. Unfortunately, this program struggled to receive committed partners unless they received government funding.

Despite the CRPD and other legislation put in place to protect the rights of Deaf people, they can still be denied interpreters when seeking healthcare and experience subpar care because of a lack of knowledge and communication. Misdiagnoses are common and providers will often focus on a person's deafness instead of the health issue that the patient wants addressed.

Although Canada has universal healthcare, hearing aids are not fully covered by insurance and coverage only applies every few years, despite parts needing to be replaced frequently. Hearing aid coverage is even worse for Indigenous populations since their healthcare is provided by the Department of Aboriginal Affairs and Northern Development instead of the Ministry of Health. Under this healthcare plan, only one hearing aid is replaced every five years, which is worse coverage than their non-Native counterparts. Indigenous people are more likely to experience poor health outcomes compared to their non-Indigenous counterparts.

SHRC noted a need for better access to emergency healthcare services, along with interpretation during treatments. As a result of their committee's work, deaf people in Saskatchewan are now able to text emergency services.

== Employment ==
Employers may not understand how to accommodate deaf people in the workforce, making it challenging for deaf people to find worthwhile employment. Many Indigenous Deaf people will either move or commute to work in urban areas because there are more deaf services and interpreters there.

== Language preservation and revitalization ==
Many Indigenous languages were lost in residential schools, including sign languages. Policies such as the Indian Act also restricted the use of Indigenous languages and prevented them from being passed down to the next generation. Some parents, especially hearing ones, simply do not have the resources they need to teach their child sign language. This means that they end up getting sent to a school where they will learn American Sign Language or Quebec Sign Language. Plains Indian Sign Language and Inuit Sign Language are currently endangered and have a small speaker population (i.e., is used by less than 10,000 people). The Canadian Encyclopedia states that revitalization efforts (e.g., teaching, learning, documenting) are being made by colleges and universities, but it does not specifically mention signed languages.

There are a few ways that the government is supporting the preservation and revitalization of Indigenous languages. On October 1, 2022, the Mi'kmaw Language Act came into effect in Nova Scotia. This act recognizes Miꞌkmaq as the first language of the province and promotes protection and revitalization efforts. The Indigenous Languages Act received royal assent in 2019 with the goal of preserving and revitalizing Indigenous languages. The government has formally acknowledged that protecting these languages is important because almost all are endangered and are central to Indigenous culture and identities. This act was developed by the Assembly of First Nations, Métis Nation, and Department of Canadian Heritage. There was some backlash to this act, considering some Indigenous groups were left out of the discussion. It also does not advocate for any form of Indigenous sign language.

BCHSD's ISL Council is creating videos and text to preserve Indigenous languages for future generations. In 1930, the Smithsonian Museum created a film dictionary that showed the use of PiSL by hearing individuals. They were able to create this film through funds given to them by U.S. Congress. Some groups are also hosting language camps where people can come to learn ISL.

The Canadian Language Museum currently has a traveling exhibit featuring six different sign languages used in Canada: American Sign Language, Quebec Sign Language, Plains Indian Sign Language, Inuit Sign Language, Maritime Sign Language, and Oneida Sign Language. This exhibit teaches people about the history of the language and who uses it. There is a virtual exhibition for people who cannot see it in person.
