= QSL =

QSL may refer to:

- Q code acknowledgement of receipt of radio message
  - QSL card, acknowledging receipt
- Qatar Stars League, the premier association football league in Qatar
- Quebec Sign Language
- Queensland State League, a defunct soccer league in Australia
- Quantum spin liquid in condensed matter physics
