= Church of St. Andrew and St. Paul =

Presbyterian church in Montreal, Quebec, Canada

The Church of St. Andrew and St. Paul
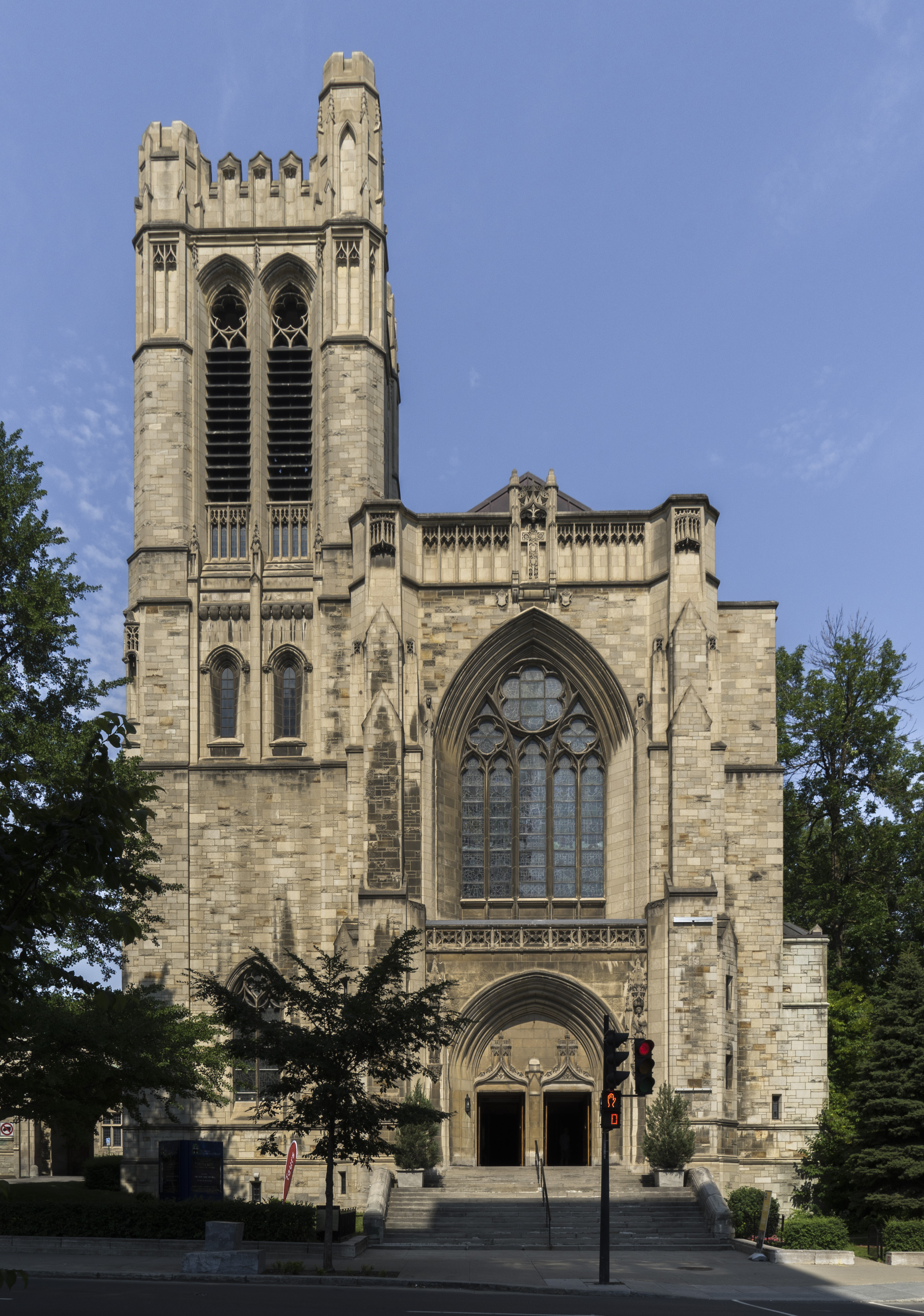
- The Church of St. Andrew and St. Paul on Sherbrooke Street West in Downtown Montreal.
- The Church of St. Andrew and St. Paul
- 45°29′54″N 73°34′51″W
- Location: Montreal, Quebec
- Country: Canada
- Denomination: Presbyterian
- Website: standrewstpaul.com

History
- Status: active
- Founded: 1918; 108 years ago

Architecture
- Architect: Harold Lea Fetherstonhaugh
- Architectural type: Gothic Revival
- Completed: 1932

Specifications
- Length: 67 m (220 ft)
- Height: 41 m (135 ft)

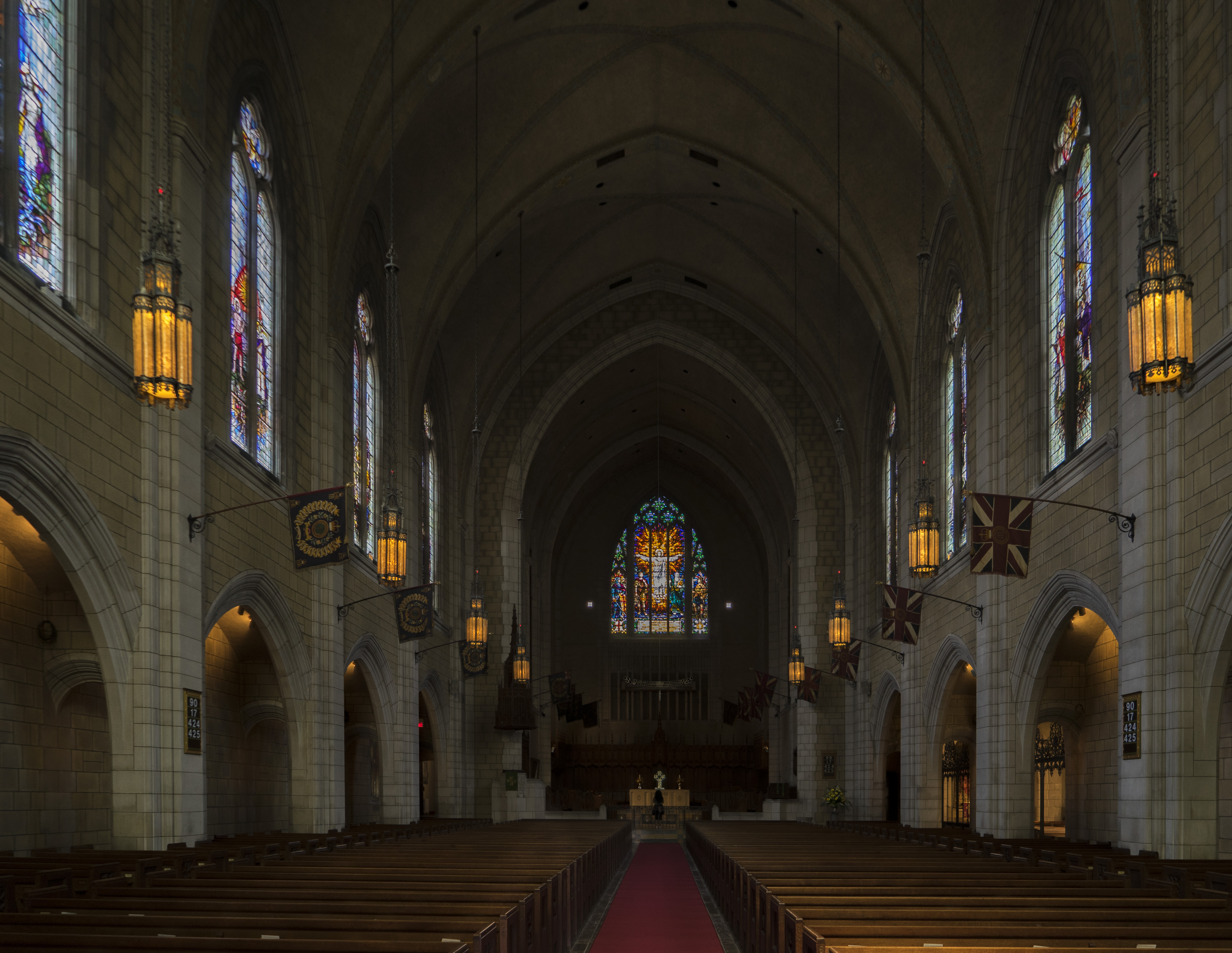
The interior of the church

The Church of St. Andrew and St. Paul is a Presbyterian church in downtown Montreal, Quebec, Canada. It is located at 3415 Redpath Street, on the corner of Sherbrooke Street (Route 138). It is in close proximity to the Golden Square Mile, the Montreal Museum of Fine Arts, Concordia University (Sir George Williams Campus) as well as the Guy–Concordia metro station.

It is the regimental church of The Black Watch (Royal Highland Regiment) of Canada.

This congregation is the result of the 1918 merger of two congregations, both formed in the early years of the nineteenth century.

== History ==
=== St. Andrew's Church ===
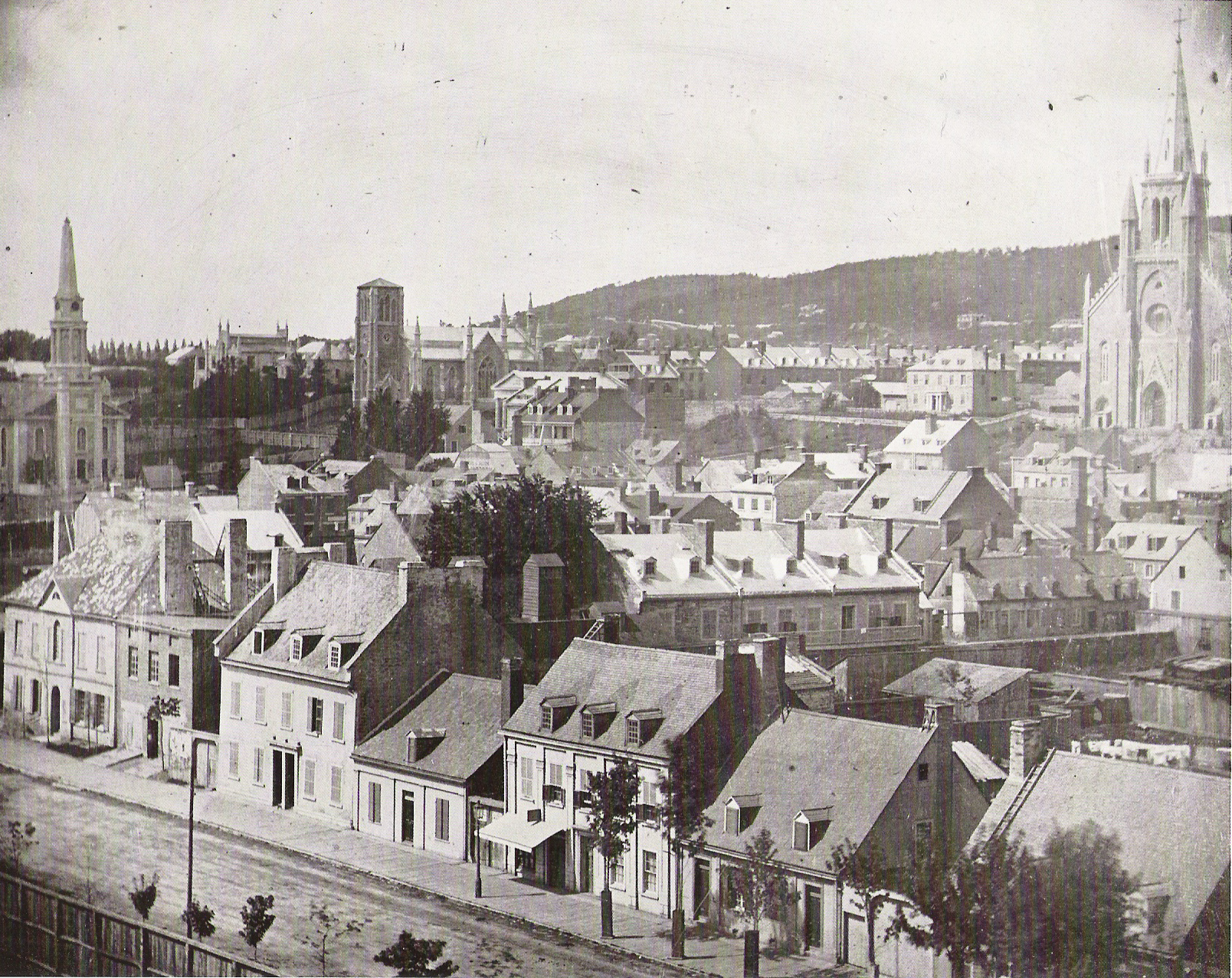
St. Andrew's Church (centre left) seen in 1852.

The congregation formed in 1802 and was originally located on Notre-Dame Street. It was the second Presbyterian congregation in Montreal, the first having been the Scots Presbyterian Congregation of St. Gabriel Street Church, founded in 1787.

In 1809, the first St. Andrew's Church was built on Saint Peter Street in Old Montreal and was also known as St. Peter's Street Church at the time. In 1820, it became more closely connected with the Church of Scotland. The new Saint Andrew's Church building was built in 1851 on Beaver Hall Hill, at the corner of De la Gauchetière Street. It was inspired by the plans of the Salisbury Cathedral, and was known as the Scottish Cathedral. The cathedral burned to the ground in 1869 and was quickly rebuilt on the same location.

In 1875, St. Andrew's stayed out of the merger that joined Canadian Presbyterians, remaining instead with the Church of Scotland until their merger with St. Paul's Church in 1918. In 1927, the former church was demolished to make place for the head office of Bell Canada on Beaver Hall Hill.

=== St. Paul's Church ===
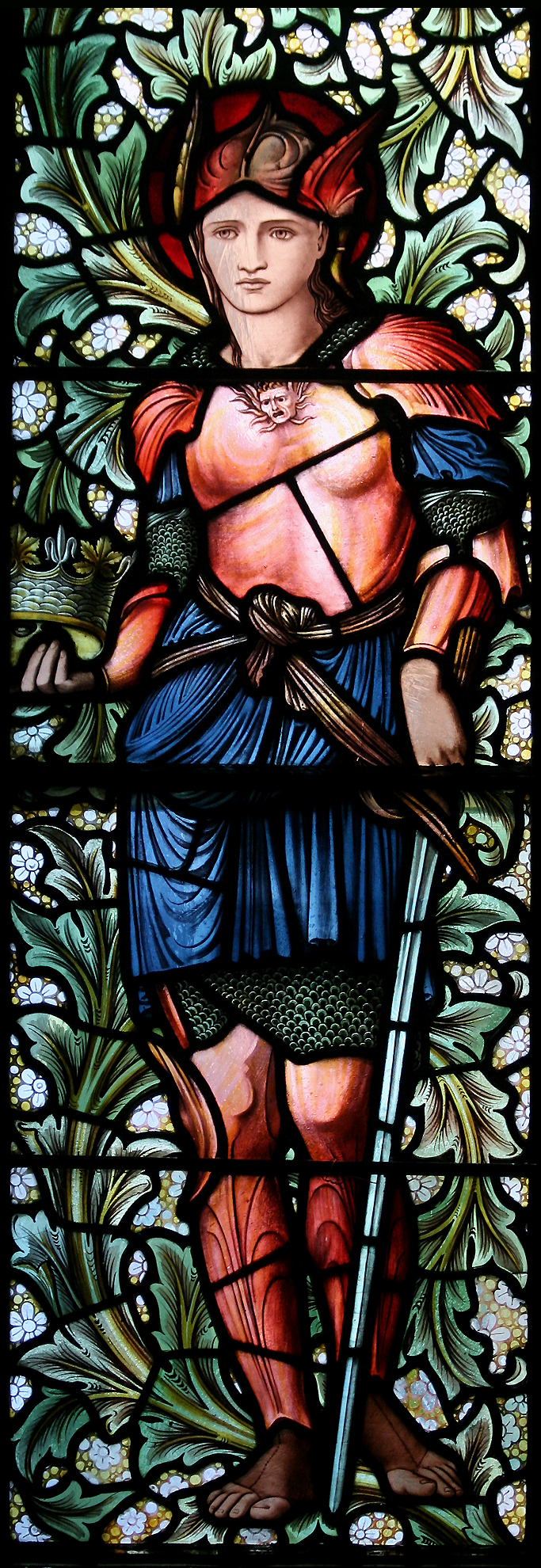
Justice. Fragment of William Morris (design E. Burne-Jones) stained glass window.

St. Paul's Church was formed in 1832, as a result of a conflict at the pioneer St. Gabriel Street Church, over the successor to Reverend James Somerville; it was between Reverend Robert Easton and Reverend Edward Black (both assistants to Sommerville). The conflict went over to Scotland, where it was encouraged that the Canadian Church of Scotland congregations form their own Synod to handle such matters. The result of this, in 1831, was to form a new congregation in Montreal and St. Paul's, under the leadership of Black was composed of the minority from St. Gabriel's. St. Gabriel's Church was placed under the leadership of Easton.

In 1834, a separate building for St. Paul's was constructed on Rue Sainte-Hélène. Designed by the architect John Wells, it was located on property owned by John Redpath and Peter McGill. It was demolished in 1868 and replaced by a commercial building. In 1867, a new St. Paul's Church was built to the plans of architect Frederick Lawford on Dorchester Boulevard (now René Lévesque Boulevard) at the corner of Sainte-Monique Street, where Terminal Tower, Queen Elizabeth Hotel and Central Station (Montreal) are located.

In 1870, this building served as the meeting place for the delegates from the four Canadian Presbyterian groups that eventually merged in 1875. St Paul's gained a few St. Andrew's families who were supportive of the Presbyterian Church in Canada.

In 1931, St. Paul's Church was slated to be demolished to make way for the construction of Central Station. It was saved from demolition by the Pères de Sainte-Croix who purchased the building for the symbolic sum of $1. Over sixty days it was dismantled stone by stone and moved to the grounds of the Collège Saint-Laurent. It was reassembled by architect Lucien Parent who modified the church slightly for its new role as a Roman Catholic church. It was also raised by one floor to allow for a theatre, Salle Émile-Legault to be built underneath. The theatre was home to the well-known Compagnons de Saint-Laurent French-language theatre troupe. It became vacant following the secularization of the institution, and was converted into a museum in 1979. The Musée des métiers d'art du Québec is today located in what was originally St. Paul's Church.

=== The Church of St. Andrew and St. Paul ===
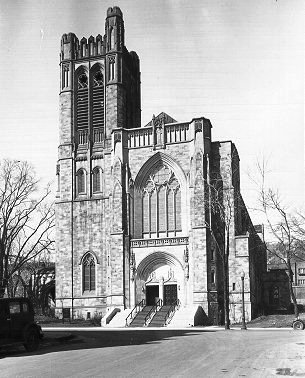
The Church of St. Andrew and St. Paul in 1936.

The present building was constructed on Sherbrooke Street at the corner of Redpath, and opened in 1932. Kildonan Hall, the house of devout Presbyterian Joseph Mackay, was destroyed in order to make way for the new church. The idea to build this church came about in 1918 following the merger of two separate Presbyterian congregations formed in the 19th century.

It was designed in the Gothic Revival architecture style largely by Montreal draftsman H. Ross Wiggs who worked for the firm of Harold Lea Fetherstonhaugh. The materials used in construction were steel and reinforced concrete, although the interior is made entirely of stone. Built in the style of a cathedral, the interior of the church has three aisles. A large stained glass window overlooks the main communion table. There are also two windows made by William Morris who was associated with the English Arts and Crafts Movement. The wrought iron screen located in one of the chapels won an award for the architect, Fetherstonhaugh. Many of the commemorative stained glass windows within the church originated from the former St. Paul Church.

The church's organ was built in 1932 by Casavant Frères, and is the largest in Montreal with 7000 organ pipes.

The building is 67 meters (220 feet) long, and the exterior tower is 41 metres (135 feet) high.

== Beliefs ==
=== Marriage ===
The church has an inclusive vision and celebrates both opposite-sex marriages and same-sex marriages.

== Ministers ==
- St. Andrew's (1803–1918)
  - Rev. John Forrest (1803)
  - Rev. Robert Easton (1804–1824)
  - Rev. John Burns (1824–1826)
  - Rev. Alexander Mathieson, DD (1826–1870, 1837–38 leave)
  - Rev. Gavin Lang (1870–1882)
  - Rev. J. Edgar Hill, DD (1882–1911)
  - Rev. George Duncan, DD (1914–1918)
  St. Paul's (1832–1918)
  - Rev. Edward Black, DD (1832–1845)+
  - Rev. Robert McGill, DD (1845–1856)+
  - Rev. William Snodgrass, DD (1856–1864), appointed Principal of Queen's College, Kingston, Ontario.
  - Rev. John Jenkins, DD, LLD (1865–1881)
  - Rev. James Barclay (1882–1910)
  - Rev. R. Bruce Taylor (1911–1917)
  The Church of St. Andrew and St. Paul (1918–present)
  - Rev. George Duncan, DD (1918–1924)
  - Rev. George Donald, DD (1925–1945)
  - Rev. R. J. Berlis, DD (1946–1973)
  - Rev. William Russell, (1973–1982)
  - Rev. J.S.S. Armour, DD (1983–1998, presently Minister Emeritus)
  - Rev. Richard Topping, Ph.D (Assistant Minister 1997–2000, Senior Minister February 2000-June 2009), appointed to St. Andrew's Hall Chair of Studies in the Reformed Tradition, St. Andrew's Hall, Vancouver School of Theology, University of British Columbia, July 2009; appointed Principal of the Vancouver School of Theology, July 1, 2013)
  - Rev. Jeffrey Veenstra (September 12, 2010 – May 2, 2015)
  - Rev. Dr. Glenn Chestnutt (inducted October 16, 2016)

=== Assistant and Associate Ministers ===
Since 1825, there have been many assistant and associate ministers connected with these congregations, as well as Presbyterian College students: On October 29, 2006, Rev. Steve Filyk was ordained and Inducted to this position; he had also served in this congregation as a student at Presbyterian College. In 2008, he was called to Kerrisdale Church in Vancouver. Rev. Rod. Ferguson came to the congregation as an Interim Minister during the last Vacancy. He stayed on after Rev. Veenstra's Induction.

- Rev. Robert Dobie, St. Andrew's (1852–1853)
- Rev. R. Herbert Story, St. Andrew's (1859–1860)
- Rev. James Kerr, St. Andrew's (1861–1862)
- Rev. W.M. Inglis, St. Andrew's (1862–1863)
- Rev. Andrew Paton, St. Andrew's (1864–1869)
- Rev. Robert Laing, St. Paul's (1873–1878)
- Rev. W. R. Cruickshank, St. Paul's (1878–1879)
- Rev. James Mackie, St. Paul's (1879–1880)
- Rev. W.T. Herridge, St. Paul's (1880–1883)
- Rev. F. Scott. MacKenzie, Th D., St. Andrew's and St. Paul's (1918–1920) (later Principal of Presbyterian College)
- Rev. John L. McInnis (1920–1922)
- Rev. A.M. Gordon, DD (1923–1925)
- Rev. W. Scott Taylor (1925–1927)
- Rev. A. Rudolph Uren, PhD (1921–1929)
- Rev. Donald S. Traill (1929–1930)
- Rev. Thomas Helm (1931–33)
- Rev. Hadden M. Gilmour (1933–1935)
- Rev. Allan Macleod (1935–1937)
- Rev. W. Oliver Nugent (1937–1939)
- Rev. R. J. Berlis (1939–1940)
- Rev. Gordon R. Taylor (1940–1941)
- Rev. Robert W Manning (1943–1944)
- Rev. John A. Simms (1952–1957)
- Rev. James Peter Jones (1961–1964)
- Rev. Stephen A. Hayes (1965–1972)
- Rev. Alfred Burgermeister (1975–1977)
- Rev. Alison Stewart-Patterson (1977–1979)
- Rev. Donald A. Burns (1980–1984)
- Rev. M. Raymond Drennan (1985–1986)
- Rev. Hugh N. Jack (1987–1989)
- Rev. J. Andrew Fullerton, PhD (1993–1996)
- Rev. Richard Topping (1998–2000)
- Rev. Ruth Y. Draffin (2000–2003)
- Rev. Steve Filyk (2006–2008)
- Rev. Rod Ferguson (Interim Minister 2009–2010; Assistant: 2011–2012)
- Rev. Dr. Kay Diviney (2013–2019)
- Rev. Susan Brasier (2022-present)

+ -died in office
