= Signed French =

Manually coded language

Signed French (français signé) is any of at least three manually coded forms of French that apply the words (signs) of a national sign language to French word order or grammar. In France, Signed French uses the signs of French Sign Language; the Belgium system uses the signs of French Belgian Sign Language, and in Canada the signs of Quebec Sign Language.

Signed French is used in education and for simultaneous translation, though this is increasingly falling out of practice, not as a natural form of communication among deaf people. It was first recorded by Charles-Michel de l'Épée, who claimed to create what he called "methodical signs" in the 1760's.
