= Kildonan Hall =

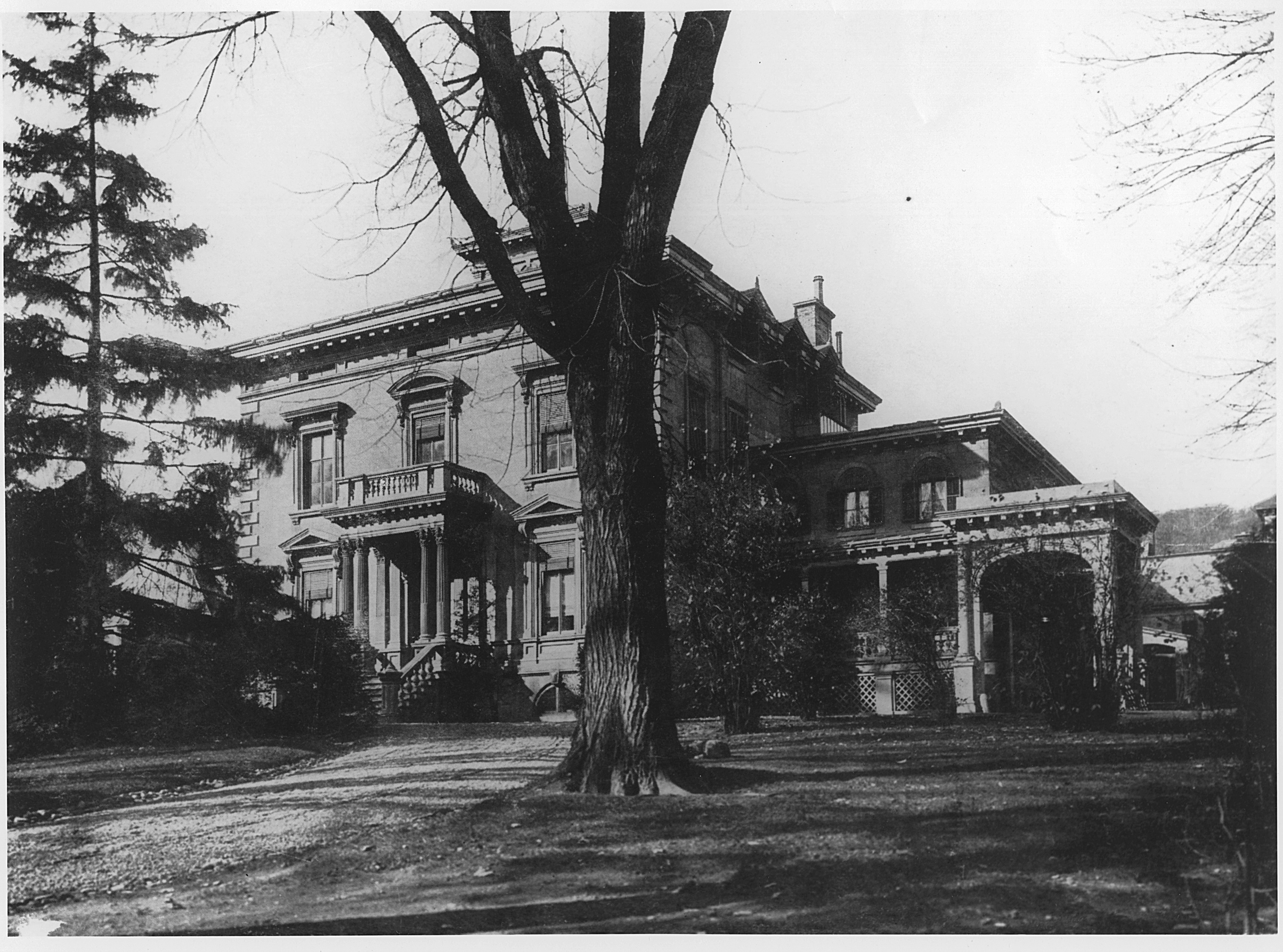
- Kildonan Hall in 1910

General information
- Type: Townhouse
- Architectural style: Italianate
- Location: 315 Sherbrooke Street West, Montreal, Canada
- Coordinates: 45°29′55″N 73°34′51″W
- Completed: 1858
- Demolished: 1930

Design and construction
- Architect: T. A. Warren

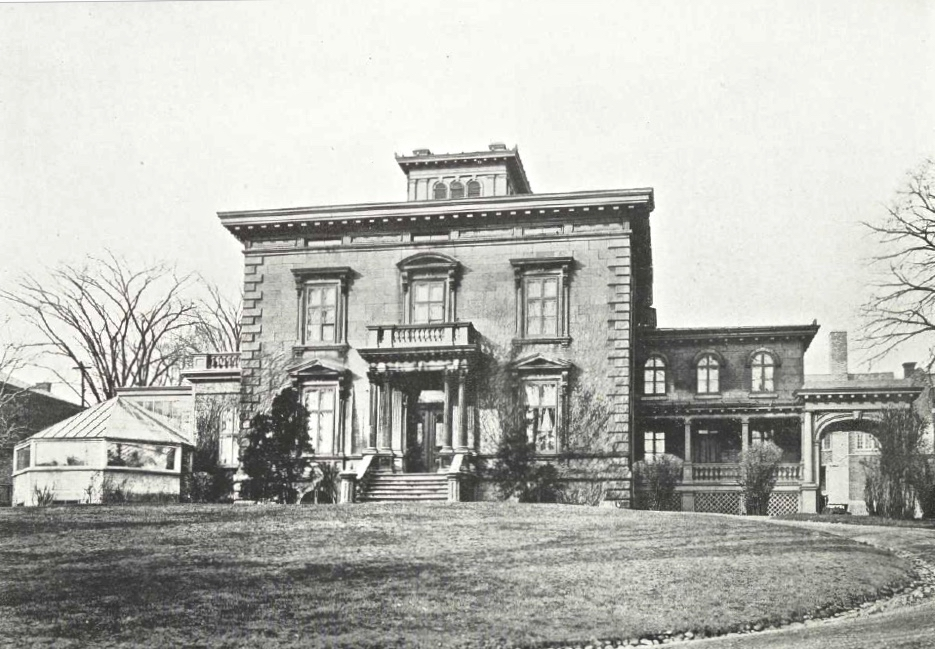
1927

Kildonan Hall was a bourgeois house located in the Golden Square Mile district of the Ville-Marie borough in Montreal, Canada.

== Location ==
The residence was located on Sherbrooke Street West, at the corner of Redpath Street, in the Golden Square Mile. Contemporary sources and images attribute different street numbers to Kildonan Hall (315, 1059, 681, then 1425), which reflects renumbering over the years.. The 1929-1930 Lovell's Street index last lists "Ed McKay" resident at 1425 Sherbrooke St W, between Bishop and Redpath.

== History ==
On October 30, 1856, Joseph Mackay purchased a plot of land at the intersection of Sherbrooke and Redpath Streets for £2,350. From 1857 to 1858, he had a house built there in the Italianate style, based on plans by the New York architect T. A. Warren, under the supervision of the architectural firm of William Spier & Sons of Montreal. The masonry was executed by a Mr. Aubertin, while the carpentry was done by G. De Pelissier and the plastering by Aitkin & Morrison. The plumbing was installed by D. Stuart. The name "Kildonan" comes from the village of Kildonan on the Isle of Arran in Scotland, where the brothers were born.

During construction, Joseph Mackay and his brother Edward said, "We are moving into the new house on the mountain". Three of their nephews, Robert, Hugh, and James, moved from Scotland to live in the new house on the mountain and work in the family shop. Over time, Kildonan Hall served as a place of welcome for visitors connected with the religious and missionary activities of the time.

A description published in 1870 reports the addition of a conservatory adjoining the residence, designed as a circular glass structure with a dome and transepts, supported by iron columns, and associated with the architect John James Browne (for this addition).

In March 1889, the horticultural facilities at Kildonan Hall included a greenhouse with a collection of ornamental plants, including orchids, azaleas, palm trees, and various species of ferns, under the care of the estate's gardener.

In October 1897, Kildonan Hall was the site of the death of Euphemia Mackay, known as "Effie," the eldest daughter of Robert Mackay. Aged 21, she died at the family residence at 1059 Sherbrooke Street in Montreal after several weeks of illness.

In 1898, Kildonan Hall was documented by William Notman; his archives are held at the McCord Stewart Museum.

1898, Notman.

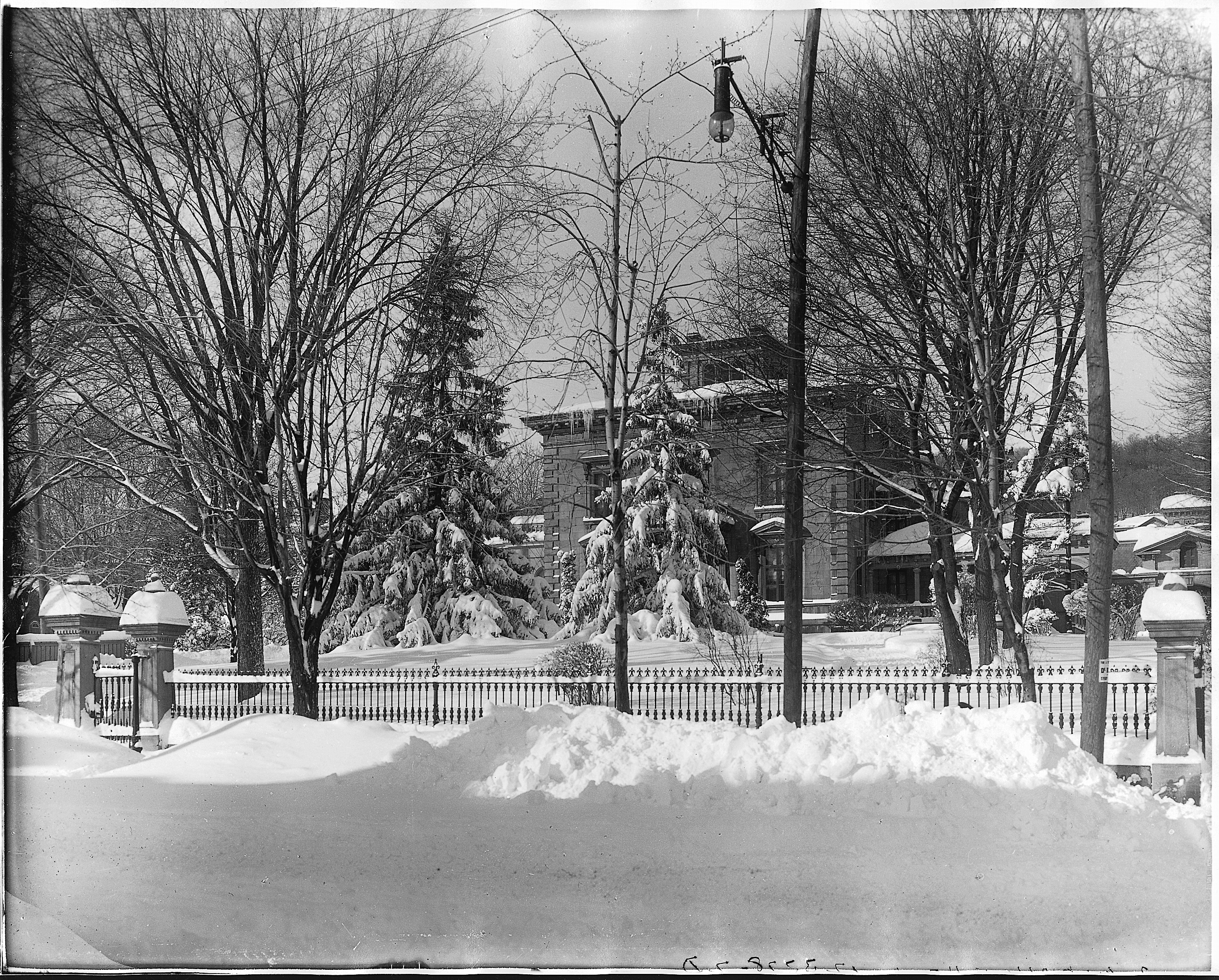

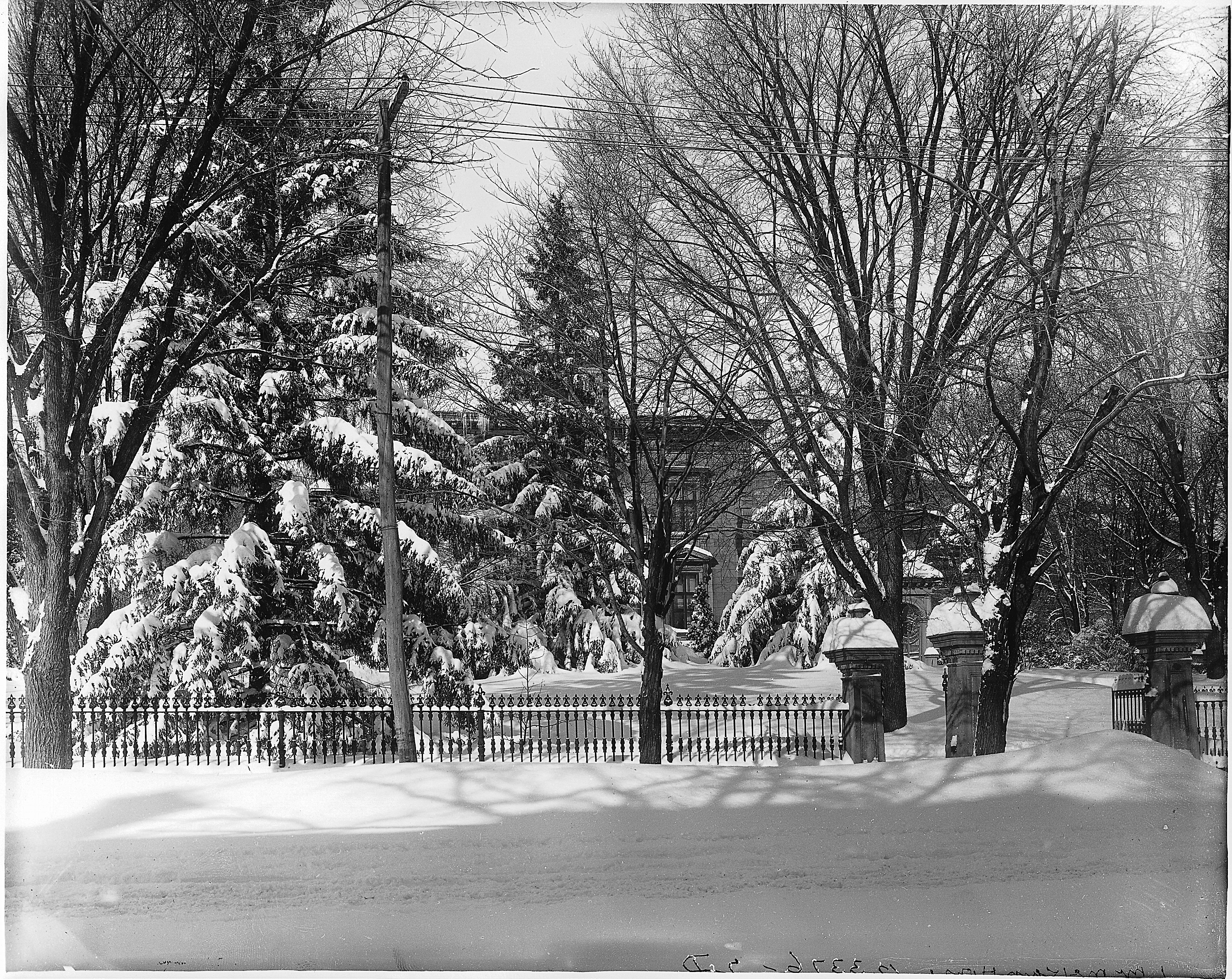

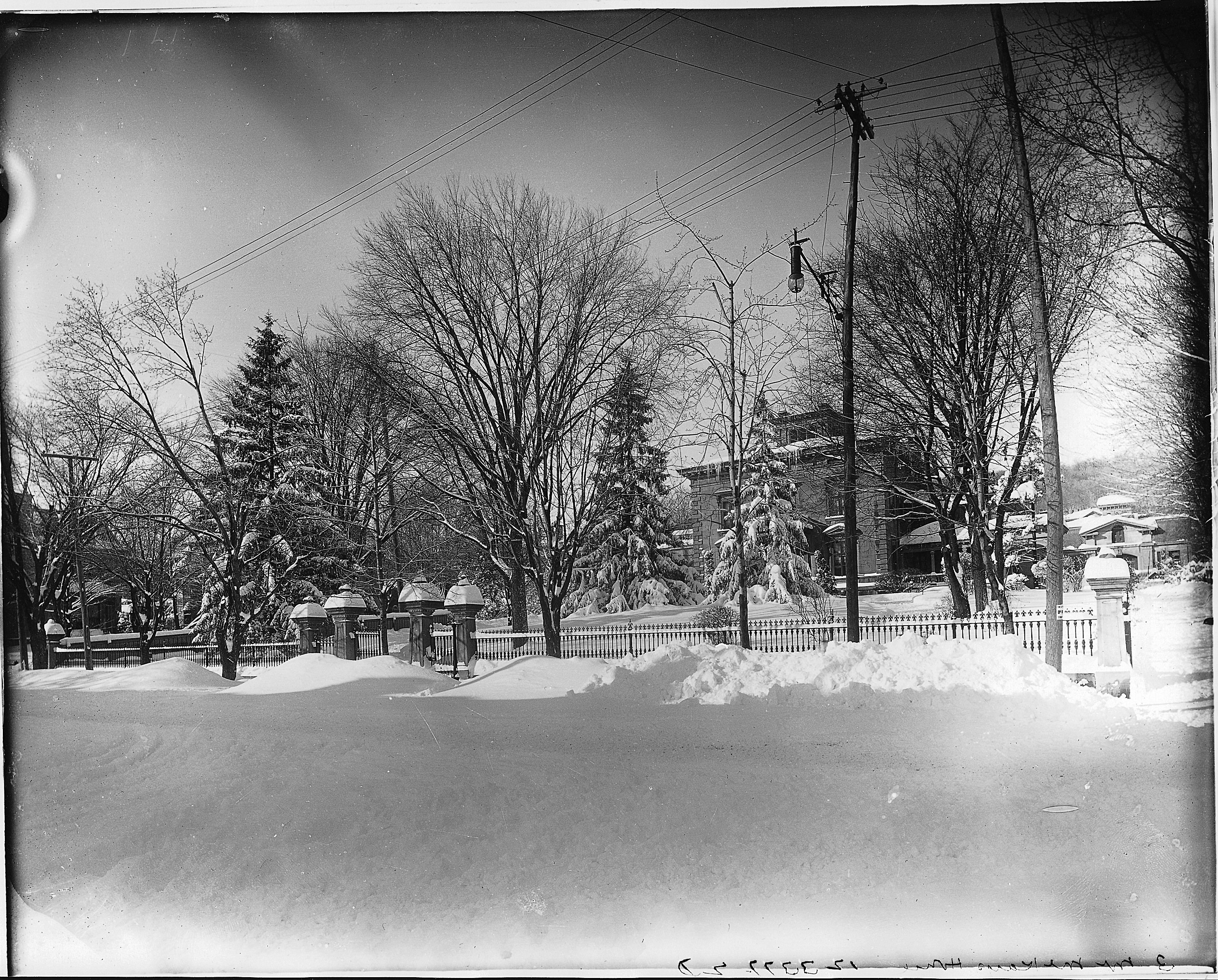

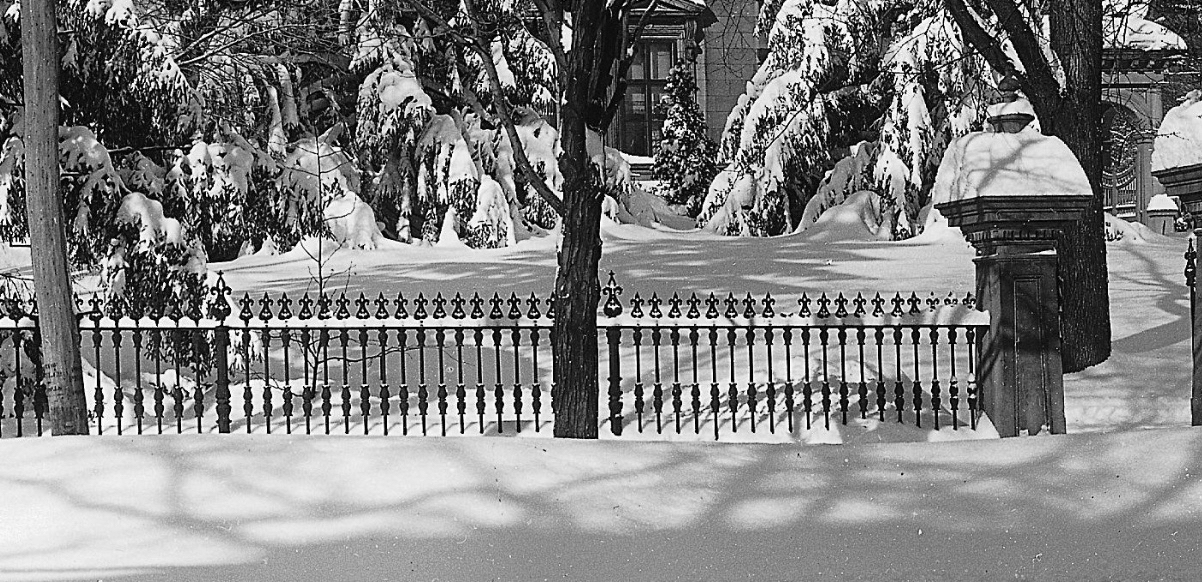

Press sources held at the BAnQ also use the toponym "Kildonan Hall" in the context of advertisements or nominal mentions (early 20th century), confirming the use of the name as a residence in Montreal.

== Demolition ==
In 1930, Kildonan Hall was demolished after more than three-quarters of a century of continuous occupation by the Mackay family. The residence, whose walls stretched from Sherbrooke Street to Simpson Street, disappeared to free up land needed for the construction of the new Presbyterian church, Saint Andrew and Saint Paul.

== See also ==
- Clan Mackay
- English-speaking Quebecers
- Golden Square Mile
- Lower Canada
- Scots-Quebecers
