= James Kewley Ward =

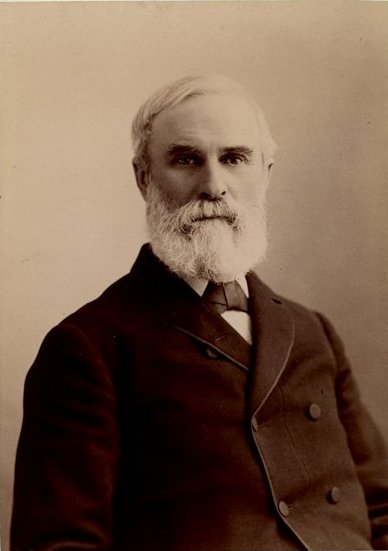

Member of the Legislative Council of Quebec for the Victoria Division
- In office June 14, 1888 – October 2, 1910
- Preceded by: Hugh Mackay
- Succeeded by: George Robert Smith

Personal details
- Born: September 9, 1819 Peel, Isle of Man
- Died: October 2, 1910 (aged 91) Westmount, Quebec

James Kewley Ward (September 9, 1819 – October 2, 1910) was a Canadian lumber merchant and politician.

Born in Peel, Isle of Man, the third son of John Ward, Ward was educated at May's Academy in Douglas, Isle of Man. He emigrated to the United States in 1842 and worked as a clerk in Albany, New York. He then worked as a clerk in a lumber mill in Troy, New York and was put in charge of the mill. In 1853, he moved to the province of Quebec where he purchased a lumber establishment on the Maskinonge River. In 1863, he moved to Trois-Rivières and purchased a mill on the St. Maurice River. In 1873, he moved to Montreal and opened the Mona sawmills on the Lachine Canal. He retired from active business in 1900.

He was a member of the council of the municipality of Côte-Saint-Antoine (renamed to Westmount, Quebec in 1895) and was mayor for nine years. A member of the Montreal Board of Trade, he was also a member of the Westmount School Commissioners for over thirty years and was chairman of that body for twenty years.

He unsuccessfully ran as the Liberal candidate for the House of Commons of Canada for the electoral district of Montreal West in the 1882 and 1887 federal election. He was appointed to the Legislative Council of Quebec for the division of Victoria in June 1888 and served until his death. He was also a member of the Council of Public Instruction and was a Justice of the Peace for the District of Montreal.

He donated $10,000 to build a public library, the Ward Public Library, opened in 1907 on Peel, Isle of Man. The Isle of Man issued two postage stamps (a 6p and 13p) in his honour in 1978.

A Methodist, he was married twice. In 1848, he married Eliza King of London, England, who died in 1854. In 1859, he married Lydia Trenholme, of Kingsey, Quebec, who died in 1900. He had three sons and seven daughters.

He died in Westmount in 1910 aged 91 and was buried in Montreal at the Mount Royal Cemetery.
