= Robert Mackay (businessman) =

Canadian politician

The Hon. Lieut.-Col. Hon. Senator Robert Mackay
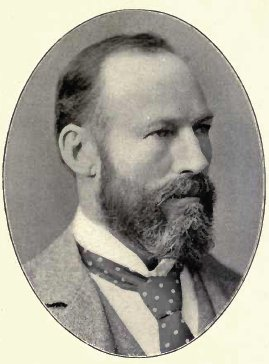

Senator for Alma, Quebec
- In office January 21, 1901 – December 25, 1916
- Appointed by: Wilfrid Laurier
- Preceded by: Alexander Walker Ogilvie
- Succeeded by: George Green Foster

Personal details
- Born: February 24, 1840 Caithness, Scotland
- Died: December 25, 1916 (aged 76) Montreal, Canada
- Resting place: Mount Royal Cemetery
- Party: Liberal
- Children: Cairine Wilson
- Occupation: Merchant

Robert Mackay (26 February 1840 – 25 December 1916) was a Canadian businessman and statesman.

== Early life ==
Robert Mackay was born in Caithness, Scotland to Angus and Euphemia Mackay. He emigrated to Montreal in 1855. He completed his education at Phillips School in Montreal.

== Career ==
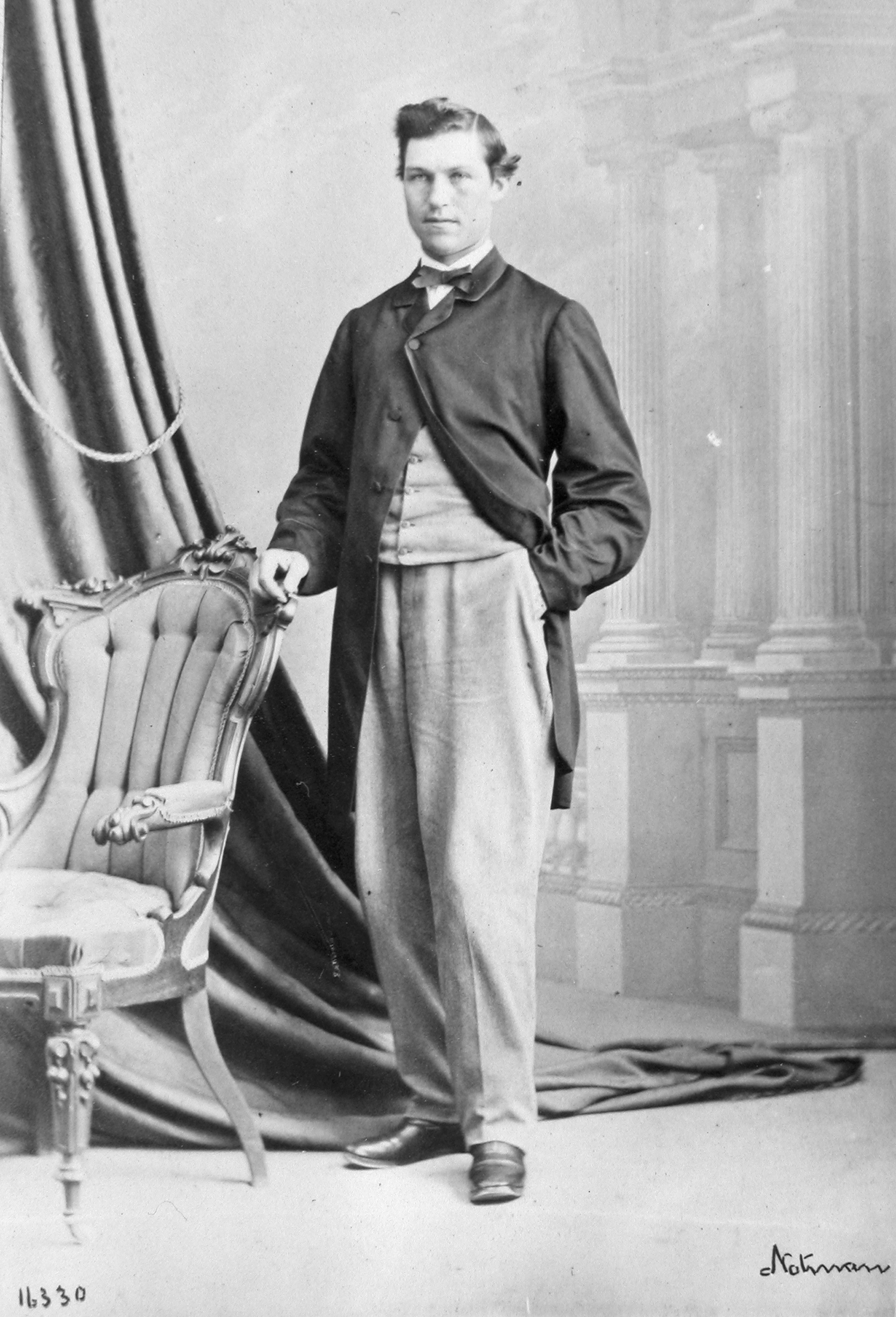
Robert Mackay taken by William Notman in his studio in Montreal in 1865.

Mackay began his professional career working for the Henry Morgan & Company department store. Mackay then went to work for Mackay Brothers Wholesalers, owned by his uncles Joseph and Edward Mackay. He became a partner in 1867, and after his uncles retired in 1875, he continued the firm with his brother Hugh Mackay. He retired from Mackay Brothers Wholesalers in 1893, having inherited $3 million from Hugh in 1890. Highly successful in business, he became a close business associate of powerful Montreal entrepreneurs: Rodolphe Forget, stockbroker; Herbert S. Holt, President of the Royal Bank of Canada; and Vincent Meredith, President of the Bank of Montreal.

Robert Mackay was president of Herald Publishing Company, the Montreal Board of Trade, the Shawinigan Water & Power Company, and the St. Jerome Power & Electric Light Co. He was vice-president of the Bell Telephone Company of Canada, the Lake of the Woods Milling Company, and the Paton Manufacturing Co. and sat on the board of directors of: the City & District Savings Bank, Dominion Iron & Steel Co., Shedden Forwarding Co. Ltd., Montreal Rolling Mills, Canada Starch Company, Port Hood Richmond Railway & Coal Co. Ltd., Shawinigan Carbide Co., St. Maurice Valley Railway, Canada Paper Company, Royal Victoria Life Insurance Co., Canadian Pacific Railway, Royal Trust Company, Bank of Montreal, Montreal Light, Heat & Power Company, and Dominion Textile Company, Limited.

He also served as President of the Saint-Andrews Society, Vice-President of the Mackay Institute, Governor of the Montreal General Hospital and the Notre Dame Hospital, and held the honorary rank of Lieutenant-Colonel of the 5th Royal Highlanders.

A member of the Liberal Party of Canada, he twice ran unsuccessfully for the House of Commons of Canada as the Liberal Party of Canada candidate for the St. Antoine, Quebec riding in the 1896 and 1900 Canadian federal elections. His brother Hugh served in Quebec's Legislative Council.

== Later life and death ==
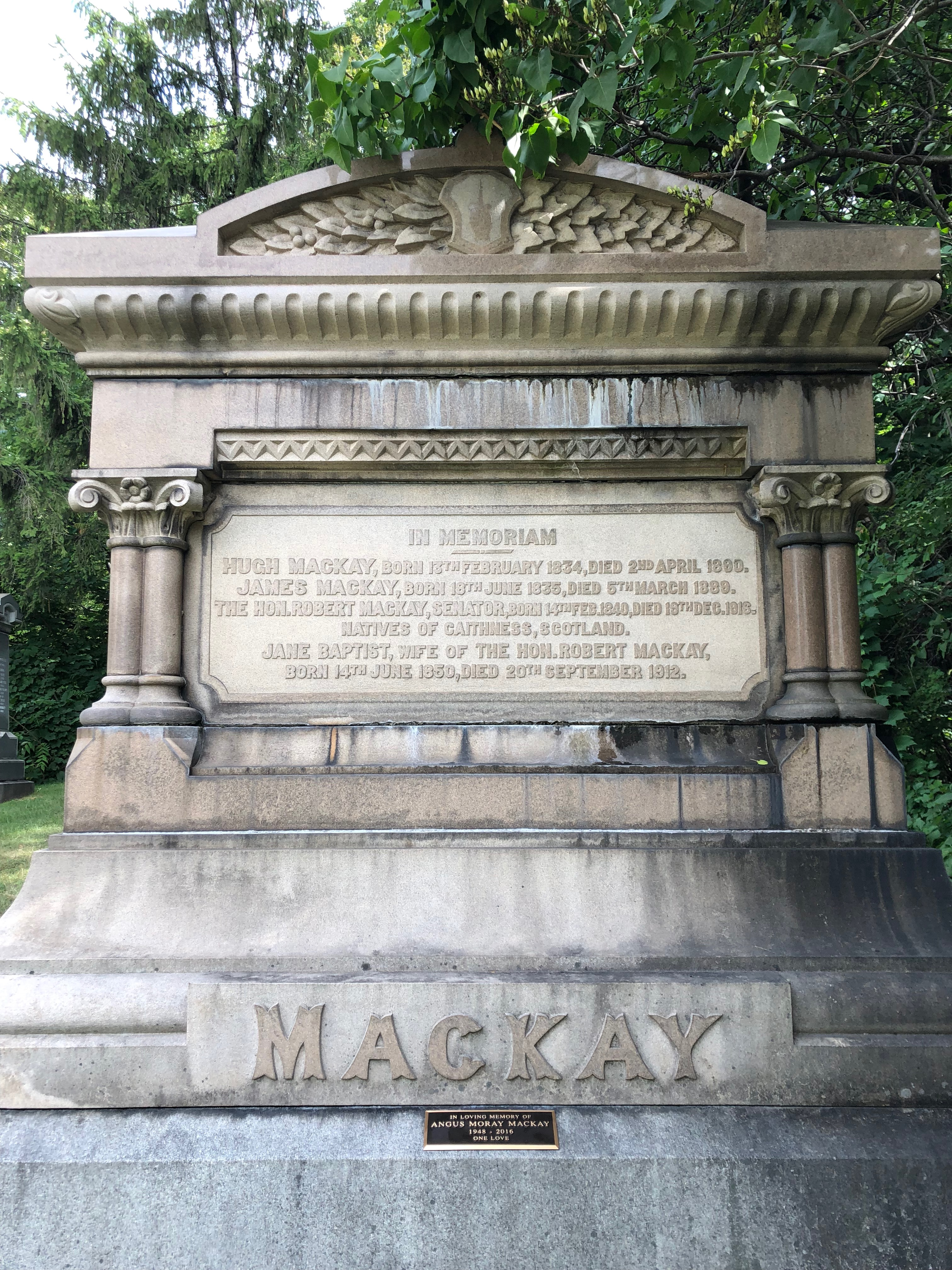
MacKay's funeral monument in Mount Royal Cemetery.

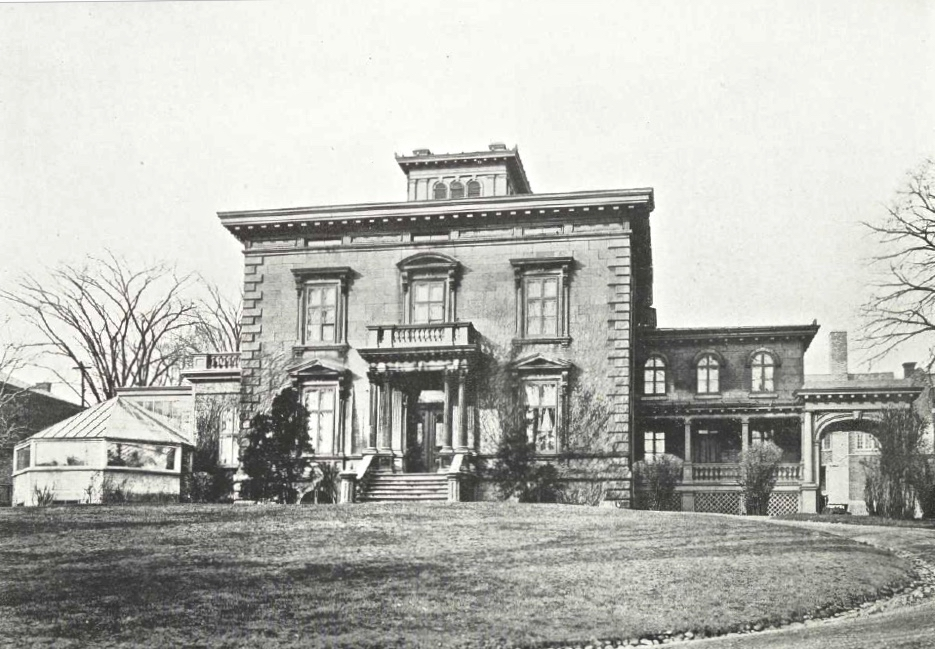
Kildonan Hall in 1927.

In 1901, he was appointed by Prime Minister Laurier to the Senate of Canada where he served until his death on Christmas Day in 1916. He died at his home, Kildonan Hall (681 Sherbrooke Street West), in Montreal's Golden Square Mile which was demolished in 1930. At the time of his death, his estate was valued at $8.2 million.

Robert Mackay is interred with his wife, Jane Baptist, with whom he had seven children, in the Mount Royal Cemetery. His daughter, Cairine Mackay Wilson, became the first woman appointed to the Canadian Senate.

== See also ==
- Act of Union 1840
- Clan Mackay
- English-speaking Quebecers
- Golden Square Mile
- List of members of the Senate of Canada M
- Lower Canada
- Scots-Quebecers
