= Harold Lea Fetherstonhaugh =

Canadian architect (1887–1971)

- Born: 1887
- Died: 1971 (aged 83–84)
- Occupation: Architect
- Practice: partnership in 1923 with J. C. McDougall, a sole proprietorship in 1934
- Buildings: Church of St. Andrew and St. Paul

Harold Lea Fetherstonhaugh (1887–1971) was a Canadian architect from Montreal, Quebec.

== Biography ==
He received a diploma from McGill University in architecture in 1909, before perfecting his work alongside brothers Edward Maxwell and William Sutherland Maxwell. He founded a partnership in 1923 with J. C. McDougall, and in founded a sole proprietorship in 1934, where he worked until 1955. He is perhaps best known as the architect of the Church of St. Andrew and St. Paul in Montreal. He also designed the Collegiate Gothic William and Henry Birks Building, home to the McGill University Faculty of Religious Studies.

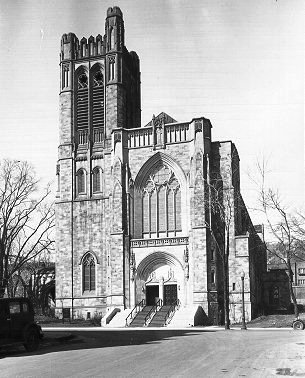
The Church of St. Andrew and St. Paul, designed by Harold Lea Fetherstonhaugh in Montreal, Quebec

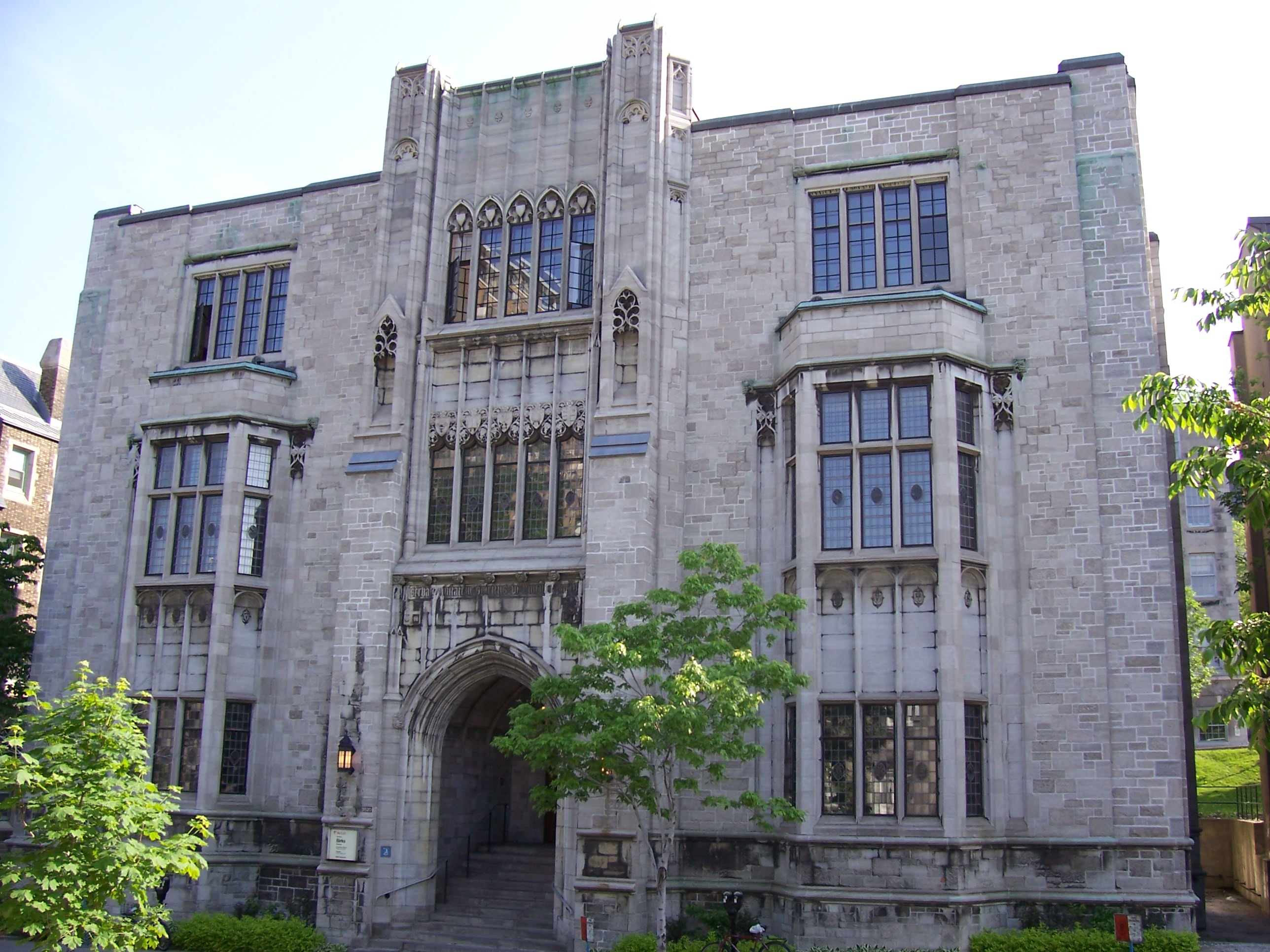
McGill University Faculty of Religious Studies
