= Hugh Mackay (Quebec politician) =

Canadian politician

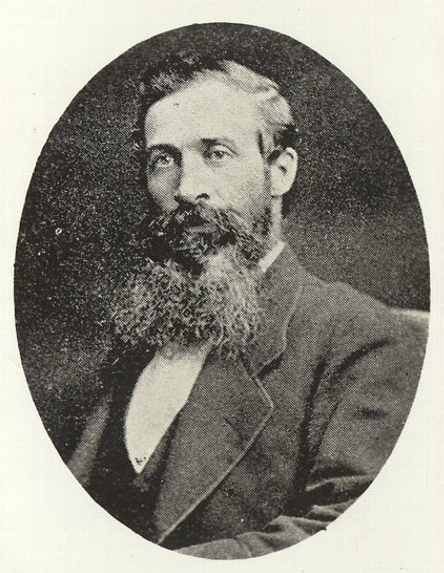

Member of the Legislative Council of Quebec for Victoria
- In office June 4, 1888 – June 13, 1888
- Preceded by: James Ferrier
- Succeeded by: James Kewley Ward

Personal details
- Born: 1832 Caithness, Scotland
- Died: April 2, 1890 (aged 57–58) Saint Louis, Missouri
- Relations: Robert Mackay, brother

Hugh Mackay (1832 – April 2, 1890) was a Scottish-born businessman and political figure in Quebec. He was a member of the Legislative Council of Quebec representing Victoria division from June 4 to 13 in 1888.

He was born in Caithness, the son of Angus Mackay and his wife Euphemia. Mackay came to Canada during the 1830s and was educated at the École Phillips in Montreal. He was employed by Joseph Mackay and Sons which was owned by his uncles, becoming a partner in 1856. Mackay was president of the Mackay Institute for deaf-mutes, vice-president of the local St. Andrew's Society and a director of the Royal Canadian Insurance Company. He was also a co-founder and director for the Bell Telephone Company of Canada. Mackay later moved to Saint Louis, Missouri, where he died at the age of 57. He was buried in Mount Royal Cemetery.

His brother Robert served in the Canadian senate.
