= Edmonton Association of the Deaf =

Nonprofit organization

Coordinates: 53°33′47.1594″N 113°33′58.8312″W

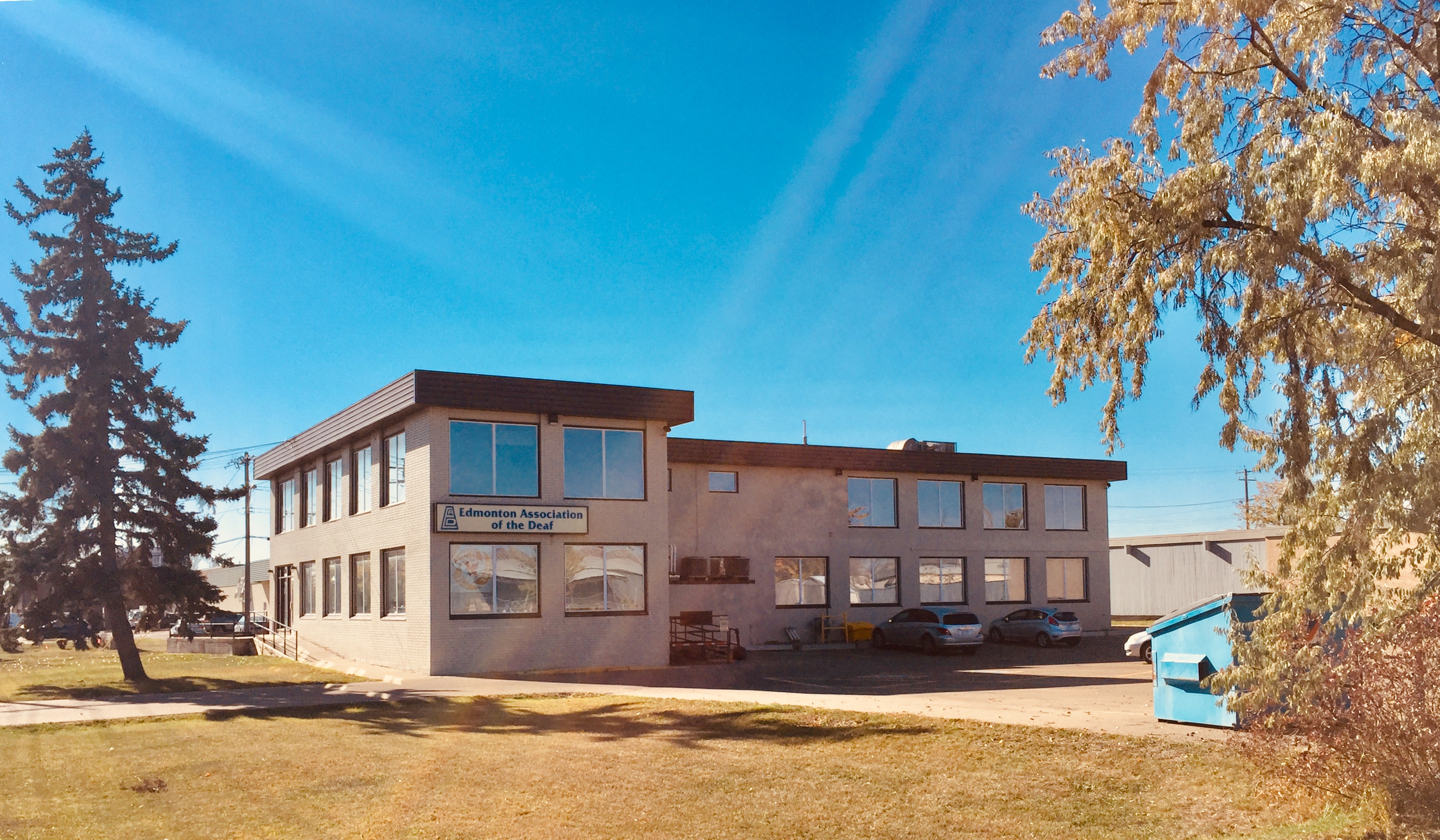
- Headquarters in Huff Bremner Estate
- Founded: 1951; 75 years ago
- Founders: Douglas Ferguson, Real Bouchard
- Headquarters: 11404 142 St NW, Edmonton, Alberta T5M 1V1, Canada
- Location: Huff Bremner Estate
- President: Kamil Burnat
- Website: edmontondeaf.com

The Edmonton Association of the Deaf (E.A.D.) is an Albertan non-governmental organization that works to promote the interests of the Deaf community in Edmonton, Alberta, Canada.

== History ==
The Edmonton Association of the Deaf was founded by Douglas Ferguson and Real Bouchard in 1951. On 16 May 1953, E.A.D. became officially registered under 'the Alberta Societies Act. Ernest Kane was the Edmonton Association of the Deaf's president in 1953. Douglas Ferguson was named president in 1956.

In 1971, the Edmonton Association of the Deaf took part in a telecommunications pilot program wherein E.A.D. President Macklin Young was selected as one of the first two individuals to receive a prototype telecommunications device for the deaf. Young's acquisition of the device was reported in news sources throughout Canada and the United States.

In 2000, Grant Undershultz served as President of the Edmonton Association of the Deaf.

== Mission ==
The Edmonton Association of the Deaf official website lists its primary objective as "promoting social, educational, recreational, physical, and moral betterment for the Deaf and Hard of Hearing." The organization also functions as "a coordinating group for the educational purposes of providing community programs/services for the Deaf" and as a advocacy group for deaf rights.

== See also ==
- Canadian Association of the Deaf
- Deaf rights movement
