= Canadian Association of the Deaf =

Canadian non-governmental organization

- Association des sourds du Canada
- Abbreviation: CAD
- Founded: 1940; 86 years ago
- Type: Non-governmental organization
- Website: cad.ca

The Canadian Association of the Deaf (CAD; French: Association des sourds du Canada, ASC) is a Canadian non-governmental organization that works to promote the interests and well-being of the Deaf community in Canada. It represents users of both American Sign Language and Quebec Sign Language. It was founded in 1940 through a joint effort by the Western Canada, the Ontario, and the Eastern Canada associations of the Deaf, with the support of the Montreal Association of the Deaf.

== History ==
The Canadian Association of the Deaf was founded in 1940 in order to create and administer a fund that could provide scholarships to Deaf persons in Canada who did not live in regions that currently provided them.

In 1970, the CAD successfully won funding from the Canadian Department of Communications to begin a Captioned Films and Telecommunications Program for Canada. It hosted a conference on captioning in Washington in 1975, and two more conferences in Canada in 1978. A partnership with the Department of Communications and the National Film Board in 1981 led to the creation of The Canadian Captioning Development Agency (CCDA), which for a time was the only such agency in Canada.

On May 12, 1989, inspired in part by the Deaf President Now protests the previous year, the CAD organized the National Deaf Education Day rally in several locations across the country to raise support for Deaf educators and sign language instruction in Deaf schools.

In 2003, the Canadian Association of the Deaf hosted the 14th World Congress of the World Federation of the Deaf in Montreal, during which the World Association of Sign Language Interpreters was established.

== See also ==
- Edmonton Association of the Deaf
- World Federation of the Deaf
