= Joseph Mackay =

Scottish-born Canadian businessman

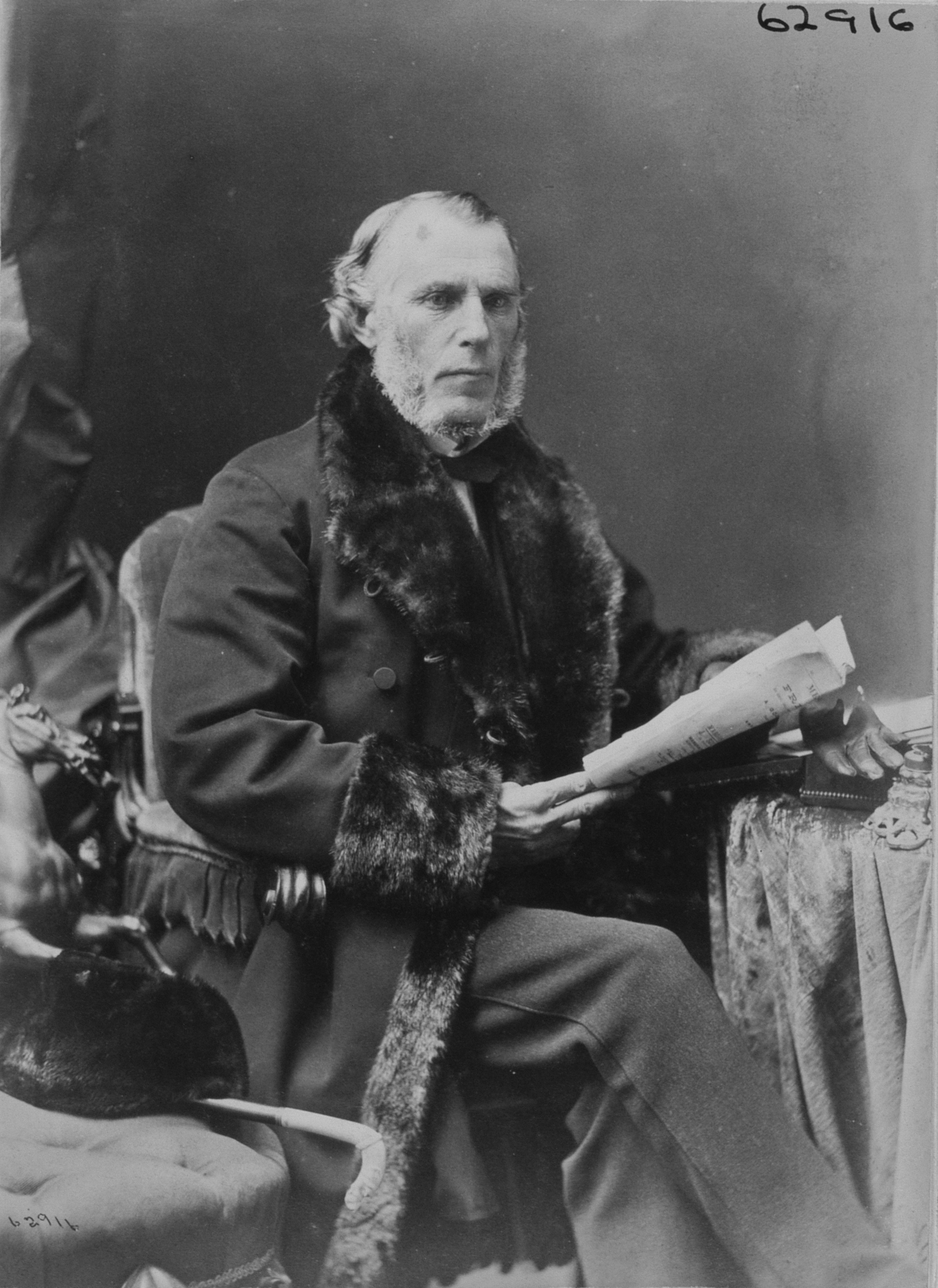
- Born: September 18, 1810; Kildonan, Arran, Scotland
- Died: June 6, 1881 (aged 70); Montreal, Canada
- Burial place: Mount Royal Cemetery; 45.508°N 73.599°W
- Occupations: Tailor & merchant
- Relatives: Robert Mackay (nephew)

Joseph Mackay (18 September 1810 – 2 June 1881), was a Scottish-born Canadian businessman and philanthropist. A co-founder of the Montreal wholesale dry goods firm Mackay Brothers, he became noted for his substantial benefactions to Presbyterian institutions and for establishing what became the Mackay Centre School for children with disabilities.

== Early life ==
Mackay was born in Kildonan, Scotland, the son of William McKay and Ann Matheson. Victims of the Highland Clearances, his family relocated to Caithness when he was thirteen. He was educated in Scotland before emigrating to Montreal, Lower Canada, in 1832, where he first established himself as a tailor and later as a dry goods merchant on Saint-Paul Street.

== Career ==
Mackay’s younger brother Edward Mackay (13 March 1813) joined him in Montreal in 1840, initially working as a clerk before becoming a partner in 1850. That same year, their nephew Hugh Mackay (1832) entered the firm and was admitted to partnership in 1856.

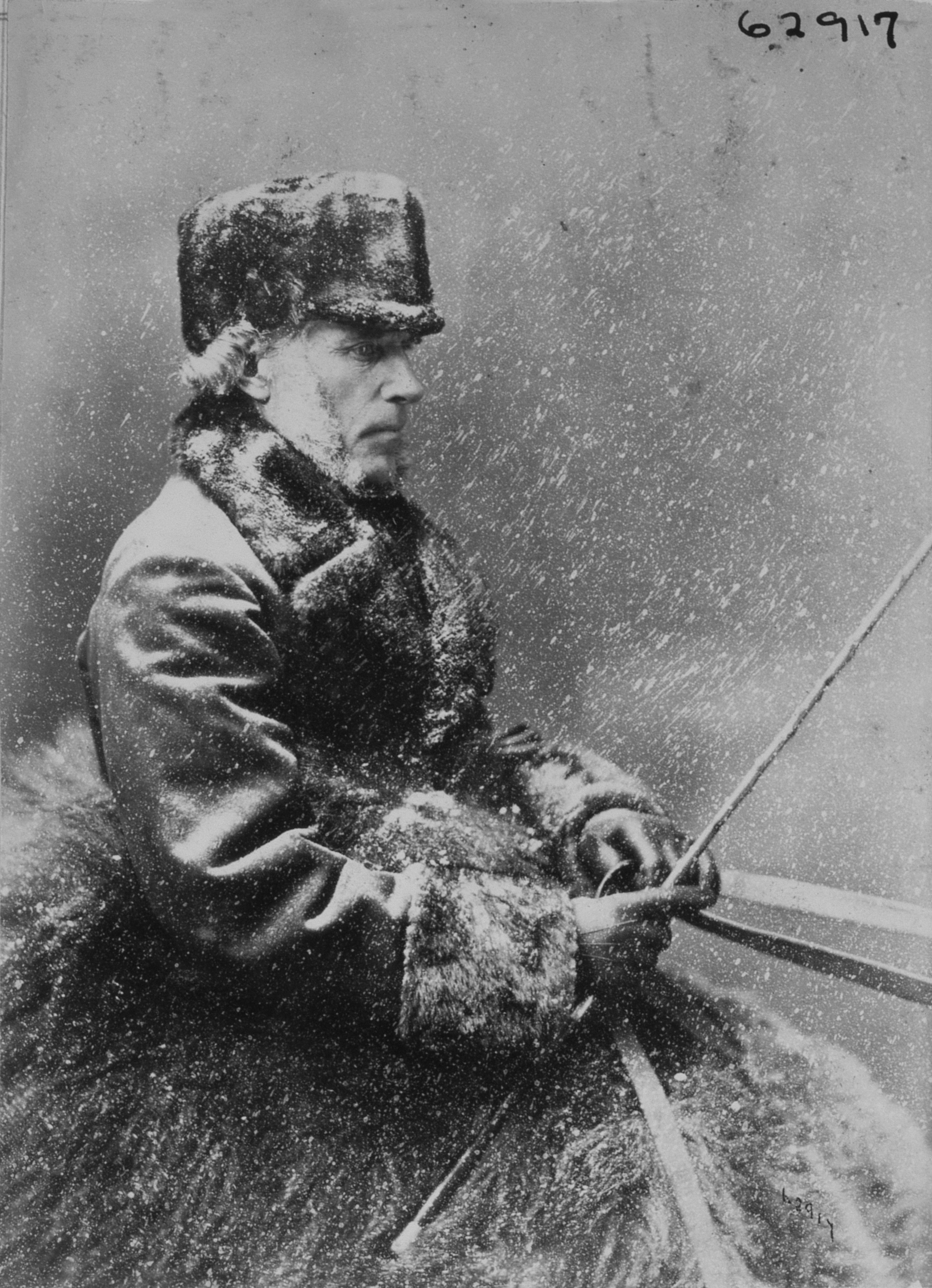
Joseph Mackay taken by William Notman in his studio in Montreal, 1871. Notman was famous for recreating snow scenes artificially in his studio, he held many patents in photography.

The company, known as Mackay Brothers Wholesalers, flourished and by 1860 had moved into large new premises on McGill Street. Joseph and Edward retired from the business in 1875, leaving management to Hugh and his brothers Robert and James.

The Mackays gained a reputation for ability, integrity, and industry.

== Philanthropy ==
=== Presbyterian College ===
A devout Presbyterian, Joseph Mackay was a key supporter of the establishment of the Presbyterian College, Montreal, which opened in 1867. He contributed $2,000 at its founding, made further donations, and helped solicit subscriptions. He served for several years on its board of managers, and after retiring in 1875 he became increasingly interested in Presbyterian missionary work, visiting missionaries during his travels in Canada and overseas.

In 1879 he was ordained an elder at St. Gabriel Street Church. Shortly before his death, he supported the establishment of a new mission in France. At his home, Kildonan Hall on Sherbrooke Street, he and Edward frequently hosted visiting ministers and missionaries.

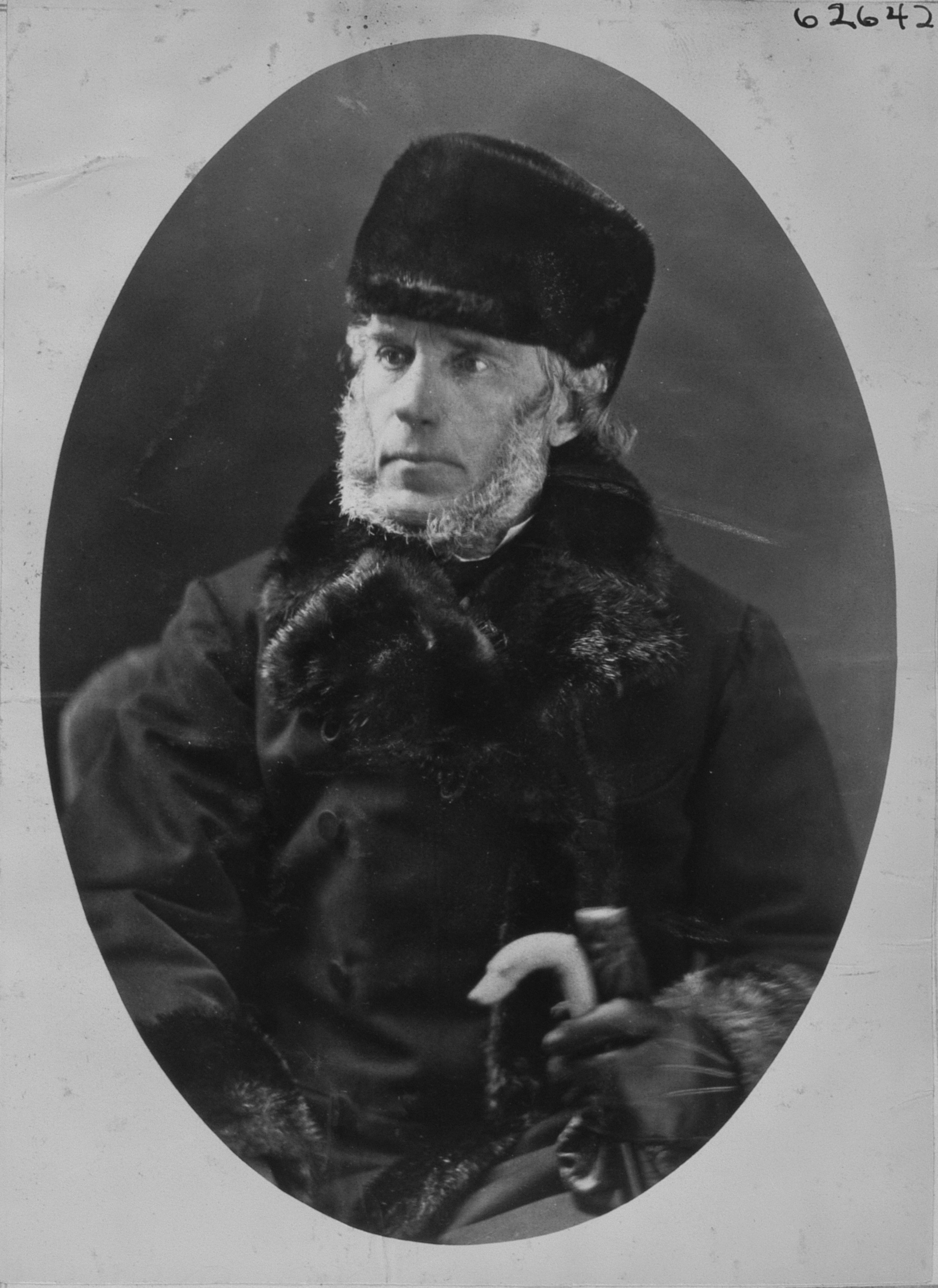

Upon his death in 1881, Joseph left $10,000 to the Presbyterian College. His brother Edward later contributed $40,000 to endow the Joseph Mackay Chair of Systematic Theology. Following Edward’s own death in 1883, his heirs endowed the Edward Mackay Chair at the college with another $40,000.

=== Mackay Institution for Protestant Deaf Mutes ===
The Mackays became most closely associated with their support for disabled children. Although not involved at its founding in 1869, Joseph began supporting the Protestant Institution for Deaf-Mutes and for the Blind in 1874, when it faced financial difficulties, and he was elected a governor.

In 1876, recognizing the need for larger facilities, Joseph donated land on Décarie Boulevard and personally financed the construction of a four-storey building. In 1878 the institution was renamed the Mackay Institution for Protestant Deaf Mutes, and Joseph became its President. He was known for his frequent visits and personal involvement in the school’s activities.

After his death, the presidency passed first to Edward, then to Hugh. The school continues today as The Mackay School for the Deaf.

== Personal life and death ==
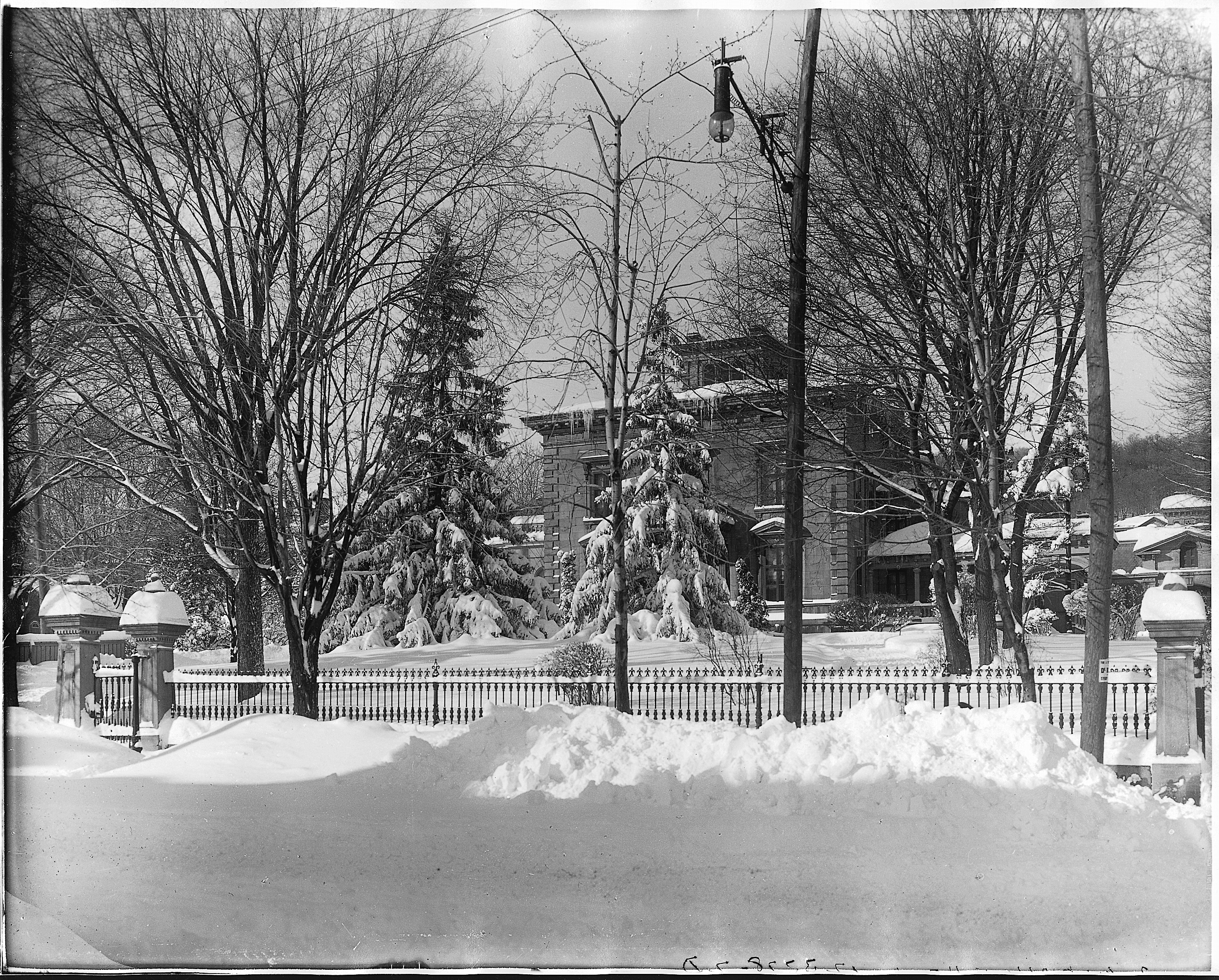
Mackay's house, Kildonan Hall, taken by William Notman & Co. in 1898 in winter.

Joseph Mackay never married. He died on 6 June 1881 at his home, Kildonan Hall. His estate, estimated at about one million dollars (roughly $53 million in 2025), passed to his brother Edward, who in turn left his fortune to Hugh and later to Robert.

Joseph and Edward Mackay, who both remained bachelors, were regarded as among the wealthiest and most generous members of Montreal’s Scottish Presbyterian community.

== See also ==
- History of Montreal
- Golden Square Mile
- Mackay School for the Deaf
- Scots-Quebecers
