= Eldridge v British Columbia (AG) =

Supreme Court of Canada decision

- Supreme Court of Canada

Hearing: April 24, 1997 Judgment: October 9, 1997
- Full case name: Robin Susan Eldridge, John Henry Warren and Linda Jane Warren v The Attorney General of British Columbia and the Medical Services Commission
- Citations: [1997] 3 SCR 624
- Docket No.: 24896
- Ruling: Eldridge appeal allowed

Court membership
- Chief Justice: Antonio Lamer; Puisne Justices: Gérard La Forest, Claire L'Heureux-Dubé, John Sopinka, Charles Gonthier, Peter Cory, Beverley McLachlin, Frank Iacobucci, John C. Major

Reasons given
- Unanimous reasons by: La Forest J

Eldridge v British Columbia (AG), [1997] 3 SCR 624, is a leading decision by the Supreme Court of Canada that expanded the application of the Canadian Charter of Rights and Freedoms under section 32 of the Charter.

Each of the appellants in this case was born deaf; their preferred means of communication was sign language. They contended that the absence of interpreters impaired their ability to communicate with their doctors and other health care providers, and thus increased the risk of misdiagnosis and ineffective treatment. The Supreme Court of Canada ruled that sign language interpreters must be provided in the delivery of medical services where doing so is necessary to ensure effective communication.

== See also ==
- List of Supreme Court of Canada cases (Lamer Court)
