= MacKay School for the Deaf =

MacKay Centre and Philip E. Layton Schools

Location
- 6333 Avenue Terrebonne; Montreal, Quebec; Canada

Information
- School type: Provincial School for the Deaf
- Founded: 1869
- Grades: K-6
- Enrollment: 30
- Language: American Sign Language (ASL), English
- Website: mackaypel.emsb.qc.ca

The MacKay Centre, formerly the MacKay School for the Deaf and the Mackay Institution for Protestant Deaf Mutes is a provincial school in Montreal, Quebec, Canada with day programs serving deaf and hard-of-hearing students of the Anglophone community of Quebec. It was founded by Thomas Widd in 1869 and named in honor of Joseph Mackay. In 1960 the institution merged with the School for Crippled Children and was the subject of another merger with the Montreal Association of the Blind in 2006.

The school teaches elementary and the deaf student population is approximately 30 in the elementary school.
