= English-speaking world =

Countries and regions where English is used

English language distribution Majority native language Official or administrative language, but not majority native language

The English-speaking world consists of the 88 countries and territories in which English is an official, administrative, or cultural language. In the 2000s, between one and two billion people spoke English, making it the largest language by number of speakers, the third largest language by number of native speakers and the most widespread language geographically. The countries in which English is the native language of most people are sometimes termed the Anglosphere. Speakers of English are called Anglophones.

Early Medieval England was the birthplace of the English language; the modern form of the language has been spread around the world since the 17th century, first by the worldwide influence of England and later the United Kingdom, and then by that of the United States. Through all types of printed and electronic media of these countries, English has become the leading language of international discourse and the lingua franca in many regions and professional fields, such as science, navigation and law.

According to Ethnologue, as of 2025, the United States and India have the most total English speakers, with 319 million and 276 million, respectively. These are followed by Pakistan (112 million), the United Kingdom (65 million), and Nigeria (62 million). Including people who speak English as a second language, estimates of the total number of Anglophones vary from 1.5 billion to 2 billion. As of 2022, there were about 400 million native speakers of English. David Crystal calculated in 2003 that non-native speakers outnumbered native speakers by a ratio of three to one.

Besides the major varieties of English—American, British, Canadian, Australian, South Africa, Irish, New Zealand English—and their sub-varieties, countries such as India, Nigeria, the Philippines, Singapore, Jamaica, and Trinidad and Tobago also have millions of native speakers of dialect continua ranging from English-based creole languages to Standard English. Other countries and territories, such as Ghana, also use English as their primary official language even though it is not the native language of most of the people. English holds official status in numerous countries within the Commonwealth of Nations.

== Majority English-speaking countries ==
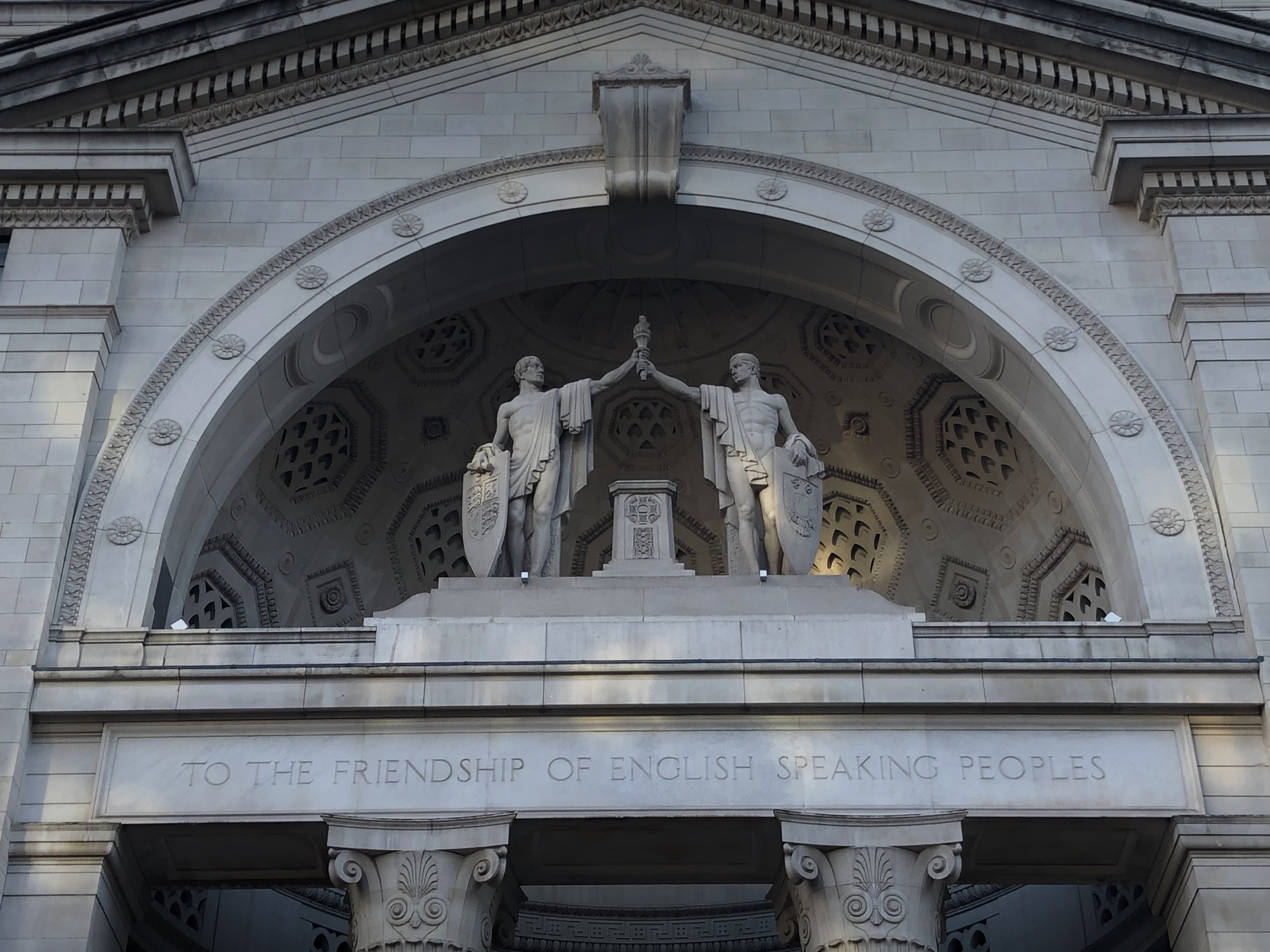
English-speaking peoples monument in London

English is the primary natively spoken language in several countries and territories. Five of the largest of these are sometimes described as the "core Anglosphere"; they are the United Kingdom, the United States, Australia, Canada, and New Zealand.

The term "Anglosphere" can also depending on situation be extended to include other countries and territories where English or an English Creole language is also the primary native language and English is the primary language of government and education, such as Ireland, Gibraltar, and the Commonwealth Caribbean.

While English is also spoken by a majority of people as a second language in a handful of countries such as Denmark, the Netherlands, Norway and Sweden, these countries are not considered part of the English-speaking world as the language is still viewed primarily as a foreign tongue and does not serve an important cultural role in society.

== Countries and territories ==
English is an official language (de facto or de jure) of the following countries and territories.

- North America: Anguilla, Antigua and Barbuda, Bahamas, Barbados, Belize, Bermuda, British Virgin Islands, Canada, Cayman Islands, Curaçao, Dominica, Grenada, Jamaica, Montserrat, Puerto Rico, Saint Kitts and Nevis, Saint Lucia, Saint Vincent and the Grenadines, Trinidad and Tobago, Turks and Caicos Islands, United States, United States Virgin Islands
- South America: Falkland Islands, Guyana
- Europe: Akrotiri and Dhekelia, Gibraltar, Guernsey, Ireland, Isle of Man, Jersey, Malta, United Kingdom
- Africa: Botswana, Cameroon, Eswatini, Gambia, Ghana, Kenya, Lesotho, Liberia, Malawi, Mauritius, Namibia, Nigeria, Rwanda, Saint Helena, Ascension and Tristan da Cunha, Sierra Leone, South Africa, South Sudan, Sudan, Tanzania, Uganda, Zambia, Zimbabwe
- Asia: Christmas Island, Cocos (Keeling) Islands, Hong Kong, India, Pakistan, Philippines, Singapore
- Oceania: American Samoa, Australia, Cook Islands, Fiji, Guam, Kiribati, Marshall Islands, Micronesia, Nauru, New Zealand, Niue, Norfolk Island, Northern Mariana Islands, Palau, Papua New Guinea, Pitcairn Islands, Samoa, Solomon Islands, Tokelau, Tonga, Tuvalu, Vanuatu

Although not official, English is also an important language in some former colonies and protectorates of the British Empire, where it is used as an administrative language. Examples are Brunei, Malaysia, Sri Lanka, and the United Arab Emirates.

== English as a global language ==
Because English is so widely spoken, it has often been called a "world language", the lingua franca of the modern era, and while it is not an official language in most countries, it is currently the language most often taught as a foreign language. It is, by international treaty, the official language for aeronautical and maritime communications. English is one of the official languages of the United Nations and many other international organizations, including the International Olympic Committee. It is also one of the two major languages spoken on board the International Space Station (the other being Russian).

The English language has a particular significance in the Commonwealth of Nations, which developed from the British Empire. English is the medium of inter-Commonwealth relations. The English language as used in the Commonwealth is sometimes referred to as Commonwealth English, most often interchangeably with British English.

English is studied most often in the European Union, and the perception of the usefulness of foreign languages among Europeans is 67% in favour of English, ahead of 17% for German and 16% for French (as of 2012). In some of the non–English-speaking EU countries, the following percentages of adults claimed to be able to converse in English in 2012: 90% in the Netherlands; 89% in Malta; 86% in Sweden and Denmark; 73% in Cyprus, Croatia, and Austria; 70% in Finland; and over 50% in Greece, Belgium, Luxembourg, Slovenia, and Germany. In 2012, excluding native speakers, 38% of Europeans consider that they can speak English.

Books, magazines, and newspapers written in English are available in many countries around the world; English is the most commonly used language in the sciences, with Science Citation Index reporting as early as 1997 that 95% of its articles were written in English, even though only half of them came from authors in English-speaking countries.

In publishing, English literature predominates considerably, with 28% of all books published in the world [Leclerc 2011] and 30% of web content in 2011 (down from 50% in 2000).

The increasing use of the English language globally has had a large impact on many other languages, leading to language shift and language death, and to claims of linguistic imperialism. English itself has become more open to language shift as multiple regional varieties feed back into the language as a whole.

== Bibliography ==
Australian Bureau of Statistics (28 March 2013). "2011 Census QuickStats: Australia". Archived from the original on 6 November 2015.
Afhan Meytiyev (26 September 2013). "English and diplomacy" (PDF). Scotland's Census 2011. Archived from the original (PDF) on 19 February 2025.
Bao, Z. (2006). "Variation in Nonnative Varieties of English". In Brown, Keith (ed.). Encyclopedia of language & linguistics. Elsevier. pp. 377–380. doi:10.1016/B0-08-044854-2/04257-7. ISBN 978-0-08-044299-0.
Crystal, David (19 November 2004b). "Subcontinent Raises Its Voice". The Guardian.
Crystal, David (2006). "Chapter 9: English worldwide". In Denison, David; Hogg, Richard M. (eds.). A History of the English language. Cambridge University Press. pp. 420–439. ISBN 978-0-511-16893-2.
National Records of Scotland (26 September 2013). "Census 2011: Release 2A". Scotland's Census 2011.
"The Routes of English". 1 August 2015.
Northern Ireland Statistics and Research Agency (11 December 2012). "Census 2011: Key Statistics for Northern Ireland December 2012" (PDF). Statistics Bulletin. Table KS207NI: Main Language.
Northrup, David (20 March 2013). How English Became the Global Language. Palgrave Macmillan. ISBN 978-1-137-30306-6.
Office for National Statistics (4 March 2013). "Language in England and Wales, 2011". 2011 Census Analysis.
Ryan, Camille (August 2013). "Language Use in the United States: 2011" (PDF). American Community Survey Reports. p. 1. Archived from the original (PDF) on 5 February 2016.
Statistics Canada (22 August 2014). "Population by mother tongue and age groups (total), 2011 counts, for Canada, provinces and territories". Archived from the original on 23 September 2015.
Statistics New Zealand (April 2014). "2013 QuickStats About Culture and Identity" (PDF). p. 23. Archived from the original (PDF) on 15 January 2015.
Census 2011: Census in brief (PDF). Pretoria: Statistics South Africa. 2012. Table 2.5 Population by first language spoken and province (number). ISBN 9780621413885. Archived (PDF) from the original on 13 May 2015.
English and Diplomacy
