= Languages by speakers =

Languages by speakers are split into the following articles:

- List of languages by number of native speakers
- List of languages by total number of speakers
