= Global language system =

Connections between language groups

The global language system is the "ingenious pattern of connections between language groups". Dutch sociologist Abram de Swaan developed this theory in 2001 in his book Words of the World: The Global Language System and according to him, "the multilingual connections between language groups do not occur haphazardly, but, on the contrary, they constitute a surprisingly strong and efficient network that ties together – directly or indirectly – the six billion inhabitants of the earth." The global language system draws upon the world system theory to account for the relationships between the world's languages and divides them into a hierarchy consisting of four levels, namely the peripheral, central, supercentral and hypercentral languages.

== Theory ==
=== Background ===
According to de Swaan, the global language system has been constantly evolving since the time period of the early 'military-agrarian' regimes. Under these regimes, the rulers imposed their own language and so the first 'central' languages emerged, linking the peripheral languages of the agrarian communities via bilingual speakers to the language of the conquerors. Then was the formation of empires, which resulted in the next stage of integration of the world language system.

Firstly, Latin emerged from Rome. Under the rule of the Roman Empire, which ruled an extensive group of states, the usage of Latin stretched along the Mediterranean coast, the southern half of Europe, and more sparsely to the North and then into the Germanic and Celtic lands. Thus, Latin evolved to become a central language in Europe from 27 BC to 476 AD.

Secondly, there was the widespread usage of the pre-classical version of Han Chinese in contemporary China due to the unification of China in 221 BC by Qin Shi Huang.

Thirdly, Sanskrit started to become widely spoken in South Asia from the widespread teaching of Hinduism and Buddhism in South Asian countries.

Fourthly, the expansion of the Rashidun and Umayyad Caliphates alongside Islam also led to the increased usage of Arabic as a language in the Afro-Eurasian land mass.

Military conquests of preceding centuries generally determine the distribution of languages today. Supercentral languages spread by land and sea. Land-bound languages spread via marching empires: German, Russian, Arabic, Hindi, Chinese and Japanese. Languages like Bengali, Tamil, Italian and Turkish too are less considered as land-bound languages. However, when the conquerors were defeated and were forced to move out of the territory, the spread of the languages receded. As a result, some of these languages are currently barely supercentral languages and are instead confined to their remaining state territories, as is evident from German, Russian and Japanese.

On the other hand, sea-bound languages spread by conquests overseas: English, French, Portuguese, Spanish. Consequently, these languages became widespread in areas settled by European colonisers and relegated the indigenous people and their languages to peripheral positions.

Besides, the world-systems theory also allowed the global language system to expand further. It focuses on the existence of the core, semi-peripheral and peripheral nations. The core countries are the most economically powerful and the wealthiest countries. Besides, they also have a strong governmental system in the country, which oversees the bureaucracies in the governmental departments. There is also the prevalent existence of the bourgeois, and core nations have significant influence over the non-core, smaller nations. Historically, the core countries were found in northwestern Europe and include countries such as England, France and the Netherlands. They were the dominant countries that had colonized many other nations from the early 15th century to the mid 20th century.

Then is the existence of the periphery countries, the countries with the slowest economic growth. They also have relatively weak governments and a poor social structure and often depend on primary industries as the main source of economic activity for the country.

The extracting and exporting of raw materials from the peripheral nations to core nations is the activity bringing about the most economic benefits to the country. Much of the population that is poor and uneducated, and the countries are also extensively influenced by core nations and the multinational corporations found there. Historically, peripheral nations were found outside Europe, the continent of colonial masters. Many countries in Latin America were peripheral nations during the period of colonization, and today peripheral countries are in sub-Saharan Africa.

Lastly, the presence of the semiperiphery countries, those in between the core and the periphery. They tend to be those which started out as peripheral nations and are currently moving towards industrialization and the development of more diversified labour markets and economies. They can as well come about from declining core countries. They are not dominant players in the international trade market. As compared to the peripheral nations, semi-peripheries are not as susceptible to manipulation by the core countries. However, most of these nations have economic or political relations with the core. Semi-peripheries also tend to exert influence and control over peripheries and can serve to be a buffer between the core and peripheral nations and ease political tensions. Historically, Spain and Portugal were semi-peripheral nations after they fell from their dominant core positions. As they still maintained a certain level of influence and dominance in Latin America over their colonies, they could still maintain their semi-peripheral position.

According to Immanuel Wallerstein, one of the most well-known theorists who developed the world-systems approach, a core nation is dominant over the non-core nations from its economic and trade dominance. The abundance of cheap and unskilled labour in the peripheral nations makes many large multinational corporations (MNCs), from core countries, often outsource their production to the peripheral countries to cut costs, by employing cheap labour. Hence, the languages from the core countries could penetrate into the peripheries from the setting up of the foreign MNCs in the peripheries. A significant percentage of the population living in the core countries had also migrated to the core countries in search of jobs with higher wages.

The gradual expansion of the population of migrants makes the language used in their home countries be brought into the core countries, thus allowing for further integration and expansion of the world language system. The semi-peripheries also maintain economic and financial trade with the peripheries and core countries. That allows for the penetration of languages used in the semi-peripheries into the core and peripheral nations, with the flow of migrants moving out of the semi-peripheral nations to the core and periphery for trade purposes.

Thus, the global language system examines rivalries and accommodations using a global perspective and establishes that the linguistic dimension of the world system goes hand in hand with the political, economic, cultural and ecological aspects. Specifically, the present global constellation of languages is the product of prior conquest and domination and of ongoing relations of power and exchange.

=== Q-value ===
$Q_i$ is the communicative value of a language i, its potential to connect a speaker with other speakers of a constellation or subconstellation, "S". It is defined as follows:

$Q_i=p_i \times c_i = \left ( \frac{P_i}{N^S} \right ) \times \left ( \frac{C_i}{M^S} \right )$

The prevalence $p_i$ of language i, means the number of competent speakers in i, $P_i$, divided by all the speakers, $N^S$ of constellation S. Centrality, $c_i$ is the number of multilingual speakers $C_i$ who speak language i divided by all the multilingual speakers in constellation S, $M^S$.

Thus, the Q-value or communication value is the product of the prevalence $p_i$ and the centrality $c_i$ of language i in constellation S.

Consequently, a peripheral language has a low Q-value and the Q-values increase along the sociology classification of languages, with the Q-value of the hypercentral language being the highest.

De Swaan has been calculating the Q-values of the official European Union (EU) languages since 1957 to explain the acquisition of languages by EU citizens in different phases.

In 1970, when there were only four language constellations, Q-value decreased in the order of French, German, Italian, Dutch. In 1975, the precursor to the EU, the European Communities, enlarged to include the UK, Denmark and the Republic of Ireland. English had the highest Q-value followed by French and German.

In the following years, the European Union grew, with the addition of countries like Austria, Finland and Sweden. Q-value of English still remained the highest, but French and German had swapped places.

In EU23, which refers to the 23 official languages spoken in the European Union, the Q-values for English, German and French were 0.194, 0.045 and 0.036 respectively.

=== Theoretical framework ===
De Swaan likens the global language system to contemporary political macrosociology and states that language constellations are a social phenomenon, which can be understood by using social science theories. In his theory, de Swaan uses the Political Sociology of Language and Political Economy of Language to explain the rivalry and accommodation between language groups.

==== Political sociology ====
This theoretical perspective centres on the interconnections among the state, nation and citizenship. Accordingly, bilingual elite groups try to take control of the opportunities for mediation between the monolingual group and the state. Subsequently, they use the official language to dominate the sectors of government and administration and the higher levels of employment. It assumes that both the established and outsider groups are able to communicate in a shared vernacular, but the latter groups lack the literacy skills that could allow them to learn the written form of the central or supercentral language, which would, in turn allow, them to move up the social ladder.

==== Political economy ====
This perspective centres on the inclinations that people have towards learning one language over the other. The presumption is that if given a chance, people will learn the language that gives them more communication advantage. In other words, a higher Q-Value. Certain languages such as English or Chinese have high Q-values since they are spoken in many countries across the globe and would thus be more economically useful than to less spoken languages, such as Romanian or Hungarian.

From an economic perspective, languages are ‘hypercollective’ goods since they exhibit properties of collective goods and produce external network effects. Thus, the more speakers a language has, the higher its communication value for each speaker. The hypercollective nature and Q-Value of languages thus help to explain the dilemma that a speaker of a peripheral language faces when deciding whether to learn the central or hypercentral language. The hypercollective nature and Q-value also help to explain the accelerating spread and abandonment of various languages. In that sense, when people feel that a language is gaining new speakers, they would assign a greater Q-value to this language and abandon their own native language in place of a more central language. The hypercollective nature and Q-value also explain, in an economic sense, the ethnic and cultural movements for language conservation.

Specifically, a minimal Q-value of a language is guaranteed when there is a critical mass of speakers committed to protecting it, thus preventing the language from being forsaken.

=== Characteristics ===
The global language system theorises that language groups are engaged in unequal competition on different levels globally. Using the notions of a periphery, semi-periphery and a core, which are concepts of the world system theory, de Swaan relates them to the four levels present in the hierarchy of the global language system: peripheral, central, supercentral and hypercentral.

De Swaan also argues that the greater the range of potential uses and users of a language, the higher the tendency of an individual to move up the hierarchy in the global language system and learn a more "central" language. Thus, de Swaan views the learning of second languages as proceeding up rather than down the hierarchy, in the sense that they learn a language that is on the next level up. For instance, speakers of Catalan, a peripheral language, have to learn Spanish, a central language to function in their own society, Spain. Meanwhile, speakers of Persian, a central language, have to learn Arabic, a supercentral language, to function in their region. On the other hand, speakers of a supercentral language have to learn the hypercentral language to function globally, as is evident from the huge number of non-native English speakers.

According to de Swaan, languages exist in "constellations" and the global language system comprises a sociological classification of languages based on their social role for their speakers. The world's languages and multilinguals are connected in a strongly ordered, hierarchical pattern. There are thousands of peripheral or minority languages in the world, each of which are connected to one of a hundred central languages. The connections and patterns between each language is what makes up the global language system. The four levels of language are the peripheral, central, supercentral and hypercentral languages.

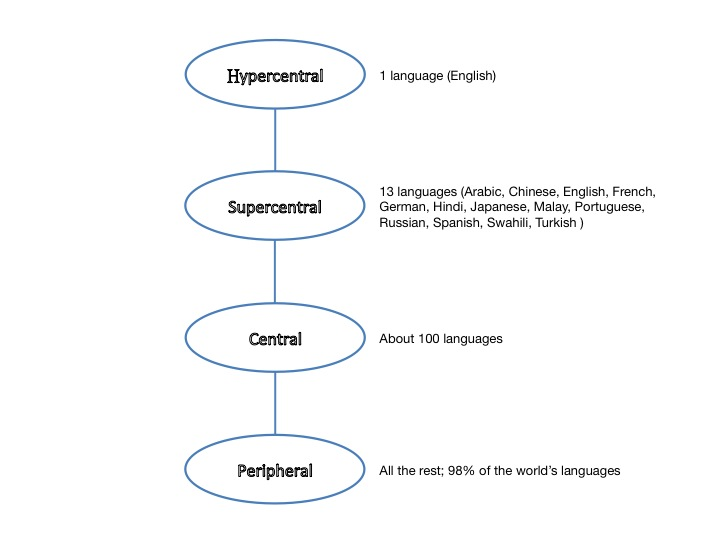
This flowchart depicts the hierarchy of the languages in de Swaan's (2001) global language system theory.

==== Peripheral languages ====
At the lowest level, peripheral languages, or minority languages, form the majority of languages spoken in the world; 98% of the world's languages are peripheral languages and spoken by less than 10% of the world’s population. Unlike central languages, these are "languages of conversation and narration rather than reading and writing, of memory and remembrance rather than record". They are used by native speakers within a particular area and are in danger of becoming extinct with increasing globalisation, which sees more and more speakers of peripheral languages acquiring more central languages in order to communicate with others.

==== Central languages ====
The next level constitutes about 100 central languages, spoken by 95% of the world's population and generally used in education, media and administration. Typically, they are the 'national' and official languages of the ruling state. These are the languages of record, and much of what has been said and written in those languages is saved in newspaper reports, minutes and proceedings, stored in archives, included in history books, collections of the 'classics', of folk talks and folk ways, increasingly recorded on electronic media and thus conserved for posterity.

Many speakers of central languages are multilingual because they are either native speakers of a peripheral language and have acquired the central language, or they are native speakers of the central language and have learned a supercentral language.

==== Supercentral languages ====
At the second highest level, 12 supercentral languages are very widely spoken languages that serve as connectors between speakers of central languages: Arabic, Chinese, English, French, German, Hindi, Japanese, Malay, Portuguese, Russian, Spanish and Swahili.

These languages often have colonial traces and "were once imposed by a colonial power and after independence continued to be used in politics, administration, law, big business, technology and higher education".

==== Hypercentral languages ====
At the highest level is the language that connects speakers of the supercentral languages. Today, English is the only example of a hypercentral language as the standard for science, literature, business, and law, as well as being the most widely spoken second language.

== Applications ==
=== Pyramid of languages of the world ===
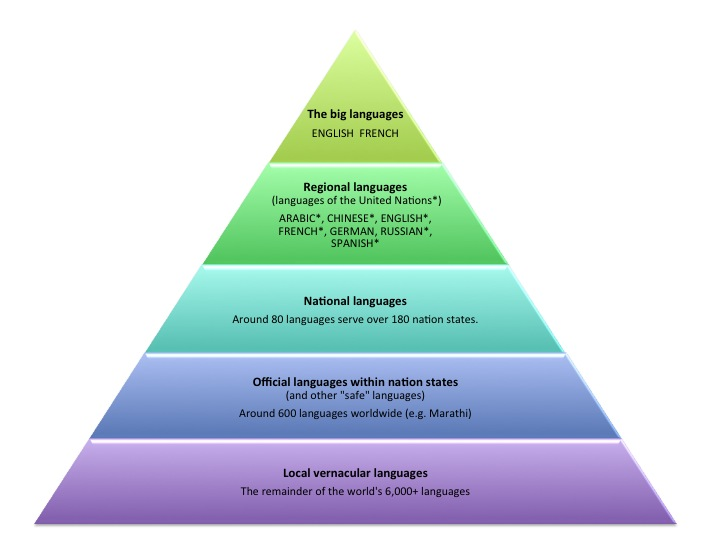
This pyramid illustrates the hierarchy of the world's languages as proposed by Graddol (1997) in his book, 'The future of English? A guide to forecasting the popularity of the English language in the 21st century', published by the British Council.

According to David Graddol (1997), in his book titled The Future of English, the languages of the world comprise a "hierarchical pyramid", as follows:

- The big languages: English, French.
- Regional languages (languages of the United Nations are marked with asterisk): Arabic*, Mandarin*, German, Russian*, and Spanish*.
- National languages: around 80 languages serving over 180 nation states (e.g. Nepali).
- Official languages within nation states (and other "safe" languages): around 600 languages worldwide (e.g. Marathi).
- Local vernacular languages: the remainder of the world's 6,000+ languages.

=== Translation systems ===
The global language system is also seen in the international translation process as explained by Johan Heilbron, a historical sociologist: "translations and the manifold activities these imply are embedded in and dependent on a world system of translation, including both the source and the target cultures".

The hierarchical relationship between global languages is reflected in the global system for translations. The more "central" a language, the greater is its capability to function as a bridge or vehicular language to facilitate communication between peripheral and semi-central languages.

Heilbron's version of the global system of language in translations has four levels:

Level 1: Hypercentral position — English currently holds the largest market share of the global market for translations; 55–60% of all book translations are from English. It strongly dominates the hierarchical nature of book translation system.

Level 2: Central position — German and French each hold 10% of the global translation market.

Level 3: Semi-central position — There are 7 or 8 languages "neither very central on a global level nor very peripheral", each making up 1 to 3% of the world market (like Spanish, Italian and Russian).

Level 4: Peripheral position — Languages from which "less than 1% of the book translations worldwide are made", including Chinese, Hindi, Japanese, Malay, Swahili, Turkish and Arabic. Despite having large populations of speakers, "their role in the translation economy is peripheral as compared to more central languages".

== Acceptance and Critiques ==
According to the Google Scholar website, de Swaan's book, Words of the world: The global language system, has been cited by 2990 other papers, as of 25 August 2021.

However, there have also been several concerns regarding the global language system:

=== Importance of Q-value ===
Van Parijs (2004) claimed that 'frequency' or likelihood of contact is adequate as an indicator of language learning and language spread. However, de Swaan (2007) argued that it alone is not sufficient. Rather, the Q-value, which comprises both frequency (better known as prevalence) and 'centrality', helps to explain the spread of (super)central languages, especially former colonial languages in newly independent countries in which only the elite minority spoke the language initially. Frequency alone would not be able to explain the spread of such languages, but Q-value, which includes centrality, would be able to.

In another paper, Cook and Li (2009) examined the ways to categorise language users into various groups. They suggested two theories: one by Siegel (2006) who used 'sociolinguistic settings', which is based on the notion of dominant language, and another one by de Swaan (2001) that used the concept of hierarchy in the global language system. According to them, de Swaan's hierarchy is more appropriate, as it does not imply dominance in power terms. Rather, de Swaan's applies the concepts of geography and function to group languages and hence language users according to the global language system. De Swaan (2001) views the acquisition of second languages (L2) as typically going up the hierarchy.

However, Cook and Li argues that this analysis is not adequate in accounting for the many groups of L2 users to whom the two areas of territory and function hardly apply. The two areas of territory and function can be associated respectively with the prevalence and centrality of the Q-value. This group of L2 users typically does not acquire an L2 going up the hierarchy, such as users in an intercultural marriage or users who come from a particular cultural or ethnic group and wish to learn its language for identity purposes. Thus, Cook and Li argue that de Swaan's theory, though highly relevant, still has its drawbacks in that the concept behind Q-value is insufficient in accounting for some L2 users.

=== Choice of supercentral languages ===
There is disagreement as to which languages should be considered more central. The theory states that a language is central if it connects speakers of "a series of central languages". Robert Phillipson questioned why Japanese is included as one of the supercentral languages but Bengali, which has more speakers, is not on the list.

=== Inadequate evidence for a system ===
Michael Morris argued that while it is clear that there is language hierarchy from the "ongoing interstate competition and power politics", there is little evidence provided that shows that the "global language interaction is so intense and systematic that it constitutes a global language system, and that the entire system is held together by one global language, English". He claimed that de Swaan's case studies demonstrated that hierarchy in different regions of the world but did not show the existence of a system within a region or across regions. The global language system is supposed to be part of the international system but is "notoriously vague and lacking in operational importance" and therefore cannot be shown to exist. However, Morris believes that this lack of evidence could be from the lack of global language data and not negligence on de Swaan's part. Morris also believes that any theory on a global system, if later proved, would be much more complex than what is proposed by de Swaan. Questions on how the hypercentral language English holds together the system must also be answered by such a global language system.

=== Theory built on inadequate foundations ===
Robert Phillipson states that the theory is based on selective theoretical foundations. He claimed that there is a lack of consideration about the effects of globalization, which is especially important when the theory is about a global system: "De Swaan nods occasionally in the direction of linguistic and cultural capital, but does not link this to class or linguistically defined social stratification (linguicism) or linguistic inequality" and that "key concepts in the sociology of language, language maintenance and shift, and language spread are scarcely mentioned".

On the other hand, de Swaan's work in the field of sociolinguistics has been noted by other scholars to be focused on "issues of economic and political sociology" and "politic and economic patterns", which may explain why he makes only "cautious references to socio-linguistic parameters".

== See also ==
- Linguistic imperialism
- World language
- List of languages by number of native speakers
- List of languages by total number of speakers
- Universal language
- Minority language
- International auxiliary language
- National language
- Lingua franca
