= Worldspeak =

You might be looking for:

- World language
- Volapük
