= Propria Cures =

Dutch satirical student newspaper, published weekly in Amsterdam

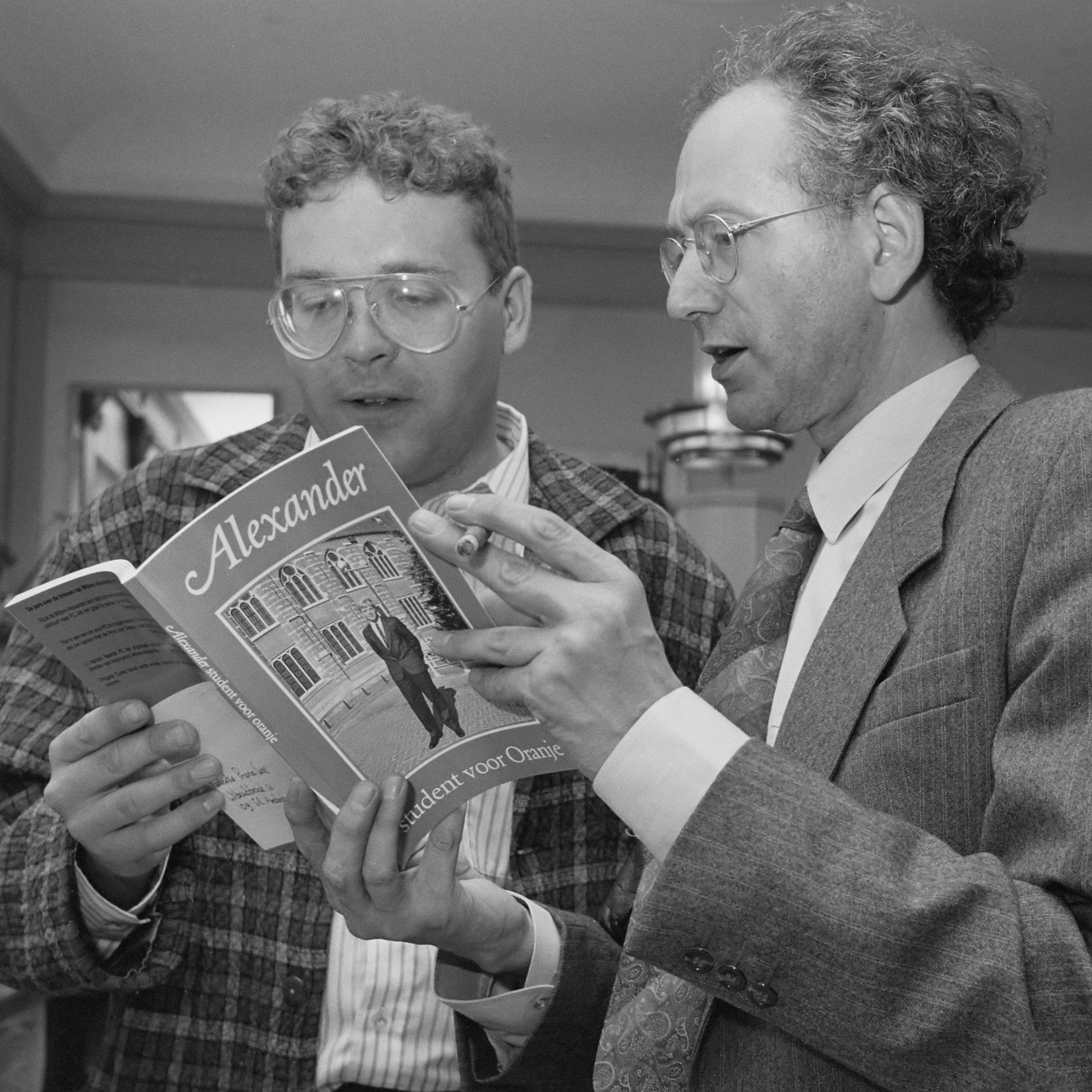
Propria Cures, ed. Marcel Verreck presents 1st copy of booklet "Alexander, student voor Oranje" to Martin van Amerongen (r) in Leiden 19 August 1988

Propria Cures (Latin for "Mind your own business") is a Dutch satirical student newspaper, published biweekly in Amsterdam. Established in 1890, it is one of the oldest student newspapers in the Netherlands. It is principally concerned with Dutch literature, media and politics. Since its establishment, Propria Cures (colloquially, PC) has been a forum for freethinkers, bohemians and rising talents.

PC specialises in printing what no one else is willing or able to say, leading, over the years, to a number of quarrels and incidents. PC was banned during World War II. In 1958, editor Herbert Leupen wrote a critical obituary for Pope Pius XII, and, as a result, was kidnapped by a group of Catholic students from Delft. Propria Cures also became one of the few journals in post-war Dutch publishing history to have been convicted of blasphemy, when in 1965, the newspaper published a fictional interview with Jesus, referring to him as a "carpenter's son who pulled himself up through active self-help". The newspaper was fined 100 guilders. In 1975, printers refused to publish a drawing by Aat Velthoen showing Dutch prime minister Joop den Uyl having intercourse with Queen Juliana. Two pages of the newspaper remained empty. A week later, PC found another printer, willing to publish the drawing. In 1992, Propria Cures published a photo montage of writer Leon de Winter lying in a mass grave, expressing the opinion that De Winter was exploiting his Jewish background. PC was convicted in court and had to pay 10,000 guilders in damages as well as publish an apology.

PC employs a large number of guest editors in addition to its regular staff. Its editors have often gone on to become well-known Dutch writers, media figures or politicians after their tenure, and have included figures like polemicist Menno ter Braak, poet and novelist J. Slauerhoff, Godfried Bomans, Hella Haasse, Hugo Brandt Corstius, sociologist Abram de Swaan, or former EU Commissioner Frits Bolkestein. Guest editors have included Willem Frederik Hermans, Karel van het Reve, Theo van Gogh, Youp van 't Hek, and Herman Koch. As of 2025 the editors of PC are Willem Fintelman, Mats Meeus and Ivar Staal.
