= List of countries by number of languages =

This is a list of countries by number of languages according to the 22nd edition of Ethnologue (2019).

Papua New Guinea has the largest number of languages in the world.

== Number of living languages and speakers ==
Country or territory	Number of living languages				Number of speakers		
Country or territory	Established	Immigrant	Total	Percent (Note: This refers to the percentage of total number of languages in the world, including both established and immigrant languages.)	Total	Mean	Median
Papua New Guinea	845	0	845	11.81	4,213,381	5,040	1,315
Indonesia	719	2	721	9.98	222,191,197	315,165	3,500
Nigeria	531	7	538	7.37	163,317,444	348,225	14,000
India	453	6	459	6.45	1,557,421,714	2,924,237	35,000
China (mainland only)	302	3	305	4.29	1,319,419,348	4,472,608	27,700
Mexico	287	5	292	4.11	125,535,200	435,886	4,730
Cameroon	274	1	275	3.87	10,228,065	38,451	10,000
Australia	226	93	319	4.49	22,693,732	72,504	10
United States	219	116	335	4.71	326,756,719	999,256	12
Brazil	217	11	228	3.21	204,653,402	934,490	210
Democratic Republic of the Congo	212	2	214	3.01	42,128,230	209,593	29,450
Philippines	183	8	191	2.69	70,776,614	386,757	19,200
Nepal	142	7	149	1.81	26,612,919	212,903	8,385
Malaysia	133	11	144	2.03	22,242,065	205,945	3,400
Chad	130	1	131	1.84	8,865,556	74,500	14,000
Tanzania	125	1	126	1.77	51,108,150	422,381	102,500
Myanmar	120	6	126	1.77	49,284,095	397,452	15,000
Russia	115	44	159	2.24	138,698,335	900,639	3,900
Vanuatu	110	6	116	1.63	196,298	1,722	665
Vietnam	109	3	112	1.58	86,884,520	835,428	14,900
Canada	96	99	195	2.74	33,362,312	174,672	260
Peru	93	1	94	1.32	30,994,201	336,893	4,635
Ethiopia	90	1	91	1.28	66,766,720	750,188	48,000
Côte d’Ivoire	86	15	101	1.42	18,439,310	209,538	34,150
Colombia	85	4	89	1.25	47,673,568	560,866	885
Laos	85	7	92	1.29	6,543,480	76,982	9,710
Ghana	81	6	87	1.22	27,661,206	359,236	36,000
Iran	79	5	84	1.18	82,927,520	1,256,478	62,000
Sudan	75	1	76	1.07	35,091,200	516,047	13,000
Pakistan	74	11	85	1.20	251,998,220	2,524,978	53,250
Thailand	73	15	88	1.24	53,357,924	675,417	8,000
Central African Republic	72	11	83	1.17	3,638,143	47,249	17,350
Solomon Islands	72	0	72	1.01	379,966	5,352	2,770
Burkina Faso	71	0	71	1.00	12,472,930	183,425	20,500
South Sudan	69	0	69	0.97	4,504,650	80,440	27,500
Mali	68	3	71	1.00	13,027,840	194,445	25,000
Kenya	67	5	72	1.01	37,037,960	544,676	180,000
Congo	62	2	64	0.90	3,690,660	60,503	14,400
Benin	55	1	56	0.79	9,605,590	177,881	64,000
Angola	46	1	47	0.66	24,288,770	528,017	30,000
Zambia	46	9	55	0.77	11,364,870	236,768	32,850
Togo	44	2	46	0.65	4,889,380	113,707	34,300
Bolivia	43	2	45	0.63	7,349,368	170,916	350
Gabon	43	1	44	0.62	1,077,960	25,069	4,000
Mozambique	43	4	47	0.66	23,792,100	517,220	197,500
Uganda	43	2	45	0.63	33,862,350	769,599	303,000
Venezuela	42	6	48	0.68	31,087,151	777,179	770
Afghanistan	41	1	42	0.59	23,352,300	569,568	16,500
Bangladesh	41	4	45	0.63	165,220,330	3,842,333	15,500
Turkey	39	15	54	0.76	90,297,204	2,149,933	66,000
New Caledonia	38	2	40	0.56	143,010	3,972	950
Senegal	38	8	46	0.65	13,977,980	310,622	20,000
Guinea	37	3	40	0.56	11,600,930	341,204	25,000
Israel	36	17	53	0.75	9,475,461	205,988	42,500
Italy	35	12	47	0.66	82,319,110	1,870,889	100,000
Botswana	31	7	38	0.53	2,213,660	63,247	5,950
Liberia	31	3	34	0.48	4,290,730	134,085	85,600
South Africa	30	12	42	0.59	51,004,892	1,416,803	133,500
Cambodia	27	2	29	0.41	16,326,490	583,089	5,210
Guatemala	27	0	27	0.38	14,708,590	544,763	28,000
Namibia	27	6	33	0.46	2,668,940	83,404	13,800
Romania	26	3	29	0.41	20,492,430	975,830	17,850
Germany	25	70	95	1.34	88,571,690	1,107,146	80,000
Argentina	24	16	40	0.56	46,160,150	1,318,861	5,120
Ecuador	24	0	24	0.34	16,665,750	694,406	11,000
Sierra Leone	24	2	26	0.37	6,977,150	290,715	138,000
Singapore	24	7	31	0.44	6,105,380	226,125	15,200
Bhutan	23	8	31	0.44	639,500	25,580	8,000
Taiwan	23	12	35	0.49	23,985,650	726,838	4,000
Guinea-Bissau	23	7	30	0.42	1,779,010	68,423	8,520
Iraq	23	4	27	0.38	33,977,620	1,477,288	136,000
Niger	23	0	23	0.32	15,810,500	718,659	28,450
Paraguay	23	4	27	0.38	6,633,188	255,123	2,530
France	22	73	95	1.42	69,961,900	1,793,895	126,000
Poland	22	5	27	0.38	37,460,007	1,498,400	12,800
Zimbabwe	22	2	24	0.34	11,926,440	596,322	145,000
Suriname	21	6	27	0.38	562,014	22,481	1,250
Ukraine	21	27	48	0.68	40,599,806	882,604	50,400
East Timor	20	1	21	0.30	1,040,816	49,563	16,700
Georgia	20	7	27	0.38	4,506,220	173,316	14,000
Greece	20	14	34	0.48	11,693,492	377,209	9,700
Algeria	18	4	22	0.31	38,548,160	1,927,408	40,000
Azerbaijan	18	20	38	0.53	9,280,890	257,802	11,700
Hungary	18	3	21	0.30	9,927,510	583,971	3,710
Micronesia	18	1	19	0.27	111,010	6,167	1,410
Malawi	17	7	24	0.34	13,016,000	813,500	200,000
Oman	17	14	31	0.44	4,236,000	151,286	42,400
Serbia	17	7	24	0.34	8,830,600	420,505	34,000
Spain	17	17	34	0.48	52,439,510	1,691,597	72,500
Syria	17	7	24	0.34	18,708,430	850,383	64,900
Croatia	16	11	27	0.38	4,333,590	180,566	10,200
Egypt	16	7	23	0.32	94,599,800	5,255,544	752,000
Guyana	16	2	18	0.25	1,319,041	109,920	1,500
Austria	15	21	36	0.51	9,490,430	316,348	32,750
Brunei	15	2	17	0.24	459,685	28,730	8,150
Eritrea	15	2	17	0.24	5,788,600	526,236	194,000
Japan	15	4	19	0.27	129,414,863	8,627,658	5,050
Netherlands	15	35	50	0.70	21,947,700	487,727	220,000
Sweden	15	22	37	0.52	10,325,090	295,003	4,000
Equatorial Guinea	14	2	16	0.23	699,150	58,262	7,000
Madagascar	14	6	20	0.28	18,368,000	1,020,444	1,130,000
Morocco	14	1	15	0.21	39,290,920	3,571,902	80,000
Panama	14	4	18	0.25	4,255,840	327,372	22,500
Bulgaria	13	12	25	0.35	7,833,570	356,071	5,310
Finland	13	25	38	0.53	5,818,940	153,130	5,170
French Guiana	13	3	16	0.23	178,780	14,898	2,400
Kazakhstan	13	35	48	0.68	15,308,820	356,019	95,000
Somalia	13	1	14	0.20	9,938,659	828,222	20,000
Switzerland	13	20	33	0.46	8,980,230	320,722	40,000
Tajikistan	13	20	33	0.46	7,580,210	303,208	27,500
United Kingdom	14	72	85	1.20	61,546,750	799,308	16,700
Belgium	12	24	36	0.51	13,686,200	506,896	200,000
Mongolia	12	2	14	0.20	3,113,100	345,900	42,500
Slovakia	12	3	15	0.21	5,524,990	460,416	25,100
Chile	11	6	17	0.24	17,412,013	1,741,201	10,000
Costa Rica	11	1	12	0.17	4,853,290	485,329	2,840
Czechia	11	15	26	0.37	10,802,090	415,465	10,000
Gambia	11	13	24	0.34	1,314,820	69,201	43,650
Jordan	11	3	14	0.20	7,572,800	841,422	94,500
Lithuania	11	4	15	0.21	3,573,225	274,863	7,555
Nicaragua	11	0	11	0.15	6,404,490	582,226	740
Norway	11	36	47	0.66	5,746,480	127,700	1,000
Slovenia	11	4	15	0.21	2,103,960	191,269	8,700
Uzbekistan	11	26	37	0.52	30,929,000	937,242	250,000
Yemen	11	6	17	0.24	26,810,300	1,915,021	62,900
Fiji	10	11	21	0.30	840,900	64,685	6,950
Honduras	10	2	12	0.17	8,982,840	816,622	990
North Macedonia	10	5	15	0.21	2,154,380	179,532	25,000
Moldova	10	4	14	0.20	2,718,530	339,816	107,000
Portugal	10	13	23	0.32	10,259,240	446,054	15,000
United Arab Emirates	10	17	27	0.38	9,266,400	370,656	370,000
French Polynesia	9	1	10	0.14	257,960	25,796	3,000
Libya	9	20	29	0.41	6,322,800	234,178	21,000
Albania	8	4	12	0.17	2,847,936	284,794	9,820
Armenia	8	6	14	0.20	3,036,180	276,016	8,850
Belize	8	4	12	0.17	532,160	44,347	14,100
Latvia	8	8	16	0.23	2,305,130	164,652	8,000
Hong Kong	7	4	11	0.15	6,929,750	692,975	118,500
Estonia	7	13	20	0.28	1,541,760	85,653	44,250
Lebanon	7	9	16	0.23	6,603,910	471,708	294,000
Mauritania	7	1	8	0.11	3,858,400	551,200	111,150
Mauritius	7	7	14	0.20	1,234,660	94,974	28,550
Palestine	7	3	10	0.14	4,258,410	473,157	705
Saudi Arabia	7	18	25	0.35	18,763,220	852,874	500,000
Sri Lanka	7	5	12	0.17	19,550,320	1,955,032	46,000
Trinidad and Tobago	7	2	9	0.13	2,628,000	328,500	15,600
Tunisia	7	8	15	0.21	11,582,100	827,293	34,650
Bahrain	6	8	14	0.20	1,263,500	97,192	144,000
Comoros	6	0	6	0.08	764,500	152,900	40,000
Kyrgyzstan	6	27	33	0.46	5,825,990	215,777	290,650
Montenegro	6	7	13	0.18	575,330	63,926	34,700
Turkmenistan	6	25	31	0.44	5,300,460	176,682	256,900
Bosnia and Herzegovina	5	7	12	0.17	3,757,804	341,619	554,000
Caribbean Netherlands	5	1	6	0.08	18,540	3,708	3,390
Macao	5	2	7	0.10	582,430	83,204	3,680
Cook Islands	5	0	5	0.07	15,000	3,000	680
Curacao	5	1	6	0.08	137,670	27,534	8,760
Cyprus	5	11	16	0.23	1,541,700	110,121	34,800
Denmark	5	34	39	0.55	5,924,220	151,903	23,100
Djibouti	5	5	10	0.14	830,400	103,800	125,300
El Salvador	5	0	5	0.07	6,378,000	2,126,000	7,500
Eswatini	5	2	7	0.10	1,261,640	180,234	20,000
Ireland	5	8	13	0.18	4,682,020	425,638	27,000
Lesotho	5	0	5	0.07	2,164,000	541,000	190,000
Monaco	5	0	5	0.07	33,850	6,770	7,110
São Tomé and Príncipe	5	3	8	0.11	204,200	25,525	14,700
Uruguay	5	9	14	0.20	3,589,050	398,783	25,500
Andorra	4	1	5	0.07	73,500	18,375	19,650
Aruba	4	2	6	0.08	86,790	21,698	7,000
Belarus	4	7	11	0.15	8,946,400	813,309	1,121,000
Dominican Republic	4	5	9	0.13	10,193,500	1,698,917	159,000
Grenada	4	0	4	0.06	107,353	35,784	5,350
Haiti	4	0	4	0.06	6,960,600	2,320,200	600
Jamaica	4	4	8	0.11	2,692,540	448,757	7,500
Liechtenstein	4	1	5	0.07	35,910	11,970	17,750
Luxembourg	4	12	16	0.23	499,250	31,203	66,100
Malta	4	4	8	0.11	468,650	58,581	9,515
New Zealand	4	61	65	0.91	4,706,160	73,534	148,000
Northern Mariana Islands	4	3	7	0.10	42,180	6,026	4,620
Palau	4	2	6	0.08	20,870	3,478	2,185
Puerto Rico	4	8	12	0.17	3,530,200	353,020	159,000
Sint Maarten	4	5	9	0.13	39,880	4,431	6,000
South Korea	4	1	5	0.07	48,586,000	16,195,333	24,202,500
Aland Islands	3	0	3	0.04	27,652	9,217	1,450
Bahamas	3	2	5	0.07	667,280	166,820	330,000
Barbados	3	0	3	0.04	518,290	172,763	256,000
Burundi	3	1	4	0.06	10,036,100	2,509,025	9,600
Cuba	3	2	5	0.07	11,403,500	3,801,167	5,700,000
Dominica	3	2	5	0.07	45,800	15,267	3,000
Greenland	3	0	3	0.04	56,200	28,100	28,100
Guadeloupe	3	1	4	0.06	449,300	149,767	218,650
Guernsey	3	1	4	0.06	62,720	31,360	31,360
Jersey	3	1	4	0.06	99,230	33,077	47,350
Kuwait	3	4	7	0.10	3,187,200	637,440	1,163,600
Martinique	3	1	4	0.06	427,330	142,443	213,500
Mayotte	3	2	5	0.07	211,700	52,925	47,900
Nauru	3	6	9	0.13	13,500	2,250	5,100
Qatar	3	15	18	0.25	2,537,980	149,293	486,000
Rwanda	3	2	5	0.07	11,124,180	2,224,836	5,440
Réunion	3	5	8	0.11	656,200	93,743	313,000
Saint Barthélemy	3	0	3	0.04	7,850	2,617	1,000
Saint Kitts and Nevis	3	0	3	0.04	52,040	17,347	1,000
Saint Lucia	3	1	4	0.06	159,600	79,800	79,800
Saint Martin	3	2	5	0.07	28,500	5,700	5,000
Saint Vincent and the Grenadines	3	0	3	0.04	138,500	46,167	400
Seychelles	3	0	3	0.04	85,420	28,473	4,590
Tonga	3	1	4	0.06	105,800	26,450	1,270
Tuvalu	3	0	3	0.04	10,100	5,050	5,050
U.S. Virgin Islands	3	3	6	0.08	85,850	21,462	9,540
Wallis and Futuna	3	0	3	0.04	12,960	4,320	3,900
Western Sahara	3	1	4	0.06	584,000	292,000	292,000
American Samoa	2	5	7	0.10	56,090	9,348	25,890
Anguilla	2	0	2	0.03	12,450	6,225	6,225
Antigua and Barbuda	2	2	4	0.06	153,800	51,267	76,700
Bermuda	2	1	3	0.04	64,610	32,305	62,000
British Virgin Islands	2	0	2	0.03	39,700	19,850	19,850
Cape Verde	2	1	3	0.04	489,800	244,900	244,900
Christmas Island	2	0	2	0.03	1,000	500	500
Cocos (Keeling) Islands	2	0	2	0.03	600	300	300
Faroe Islands	2	0	2	0.03	48,000	48,000	48,000
Gibraltar	2	1	3	0.04	46,700	15,567	21,950
Guam	2	7	9	0.13	181,400	22,675	46,750
Iceland	2	0	2	0.03	300,300	150,150	150,150
Isle of Man	2	0	2	0.03	88,000	44,000	44,000
Kiribati	2	1	3	0.04	106,000	35,333	52,750
Maldives	2	0	2	0.03	331,000	331,000	331,000
Marshall Islands	2	0	2	0.03	65,700	32,850	32,850
Montserrat	2	0	2	0.03	3,920	1,960	1,960
Niue	2	1	3	0.04	1,550	775	775
Norfolk Island	2	0	2	0.03	2,110	1,055	1,055
Pitcairn	2	0	2	0.03	36	18	18
Samoa	2	1	3	0.04	187,000	62,333	93,400
San Marino	2	0	2	0.03	25,000	12,500	12,500
Tokelau	2	3	5	0.07	2,421	484	870
Turks and Caicos Islands	2	2	4	0.06	29,840	9,947	14,365
Vatican	2	0	2	0.03	330	165	165
British Indian Ocean Territory	1	0	1	0.01	4,000	4,000	4,000
Cayman Islands	1	3	4	0.06	74,840	18,710	50,000
Falkland Islands	1	1	2	0.03	2,860	1,430	2,610
North Korea	1	0	1	0.01	23,300,000	23,300,000	23,300,000
Saint Helena	1	0	1	0.01	5,900	5,900	5,900
Saint Pierre and Miquelon	1	0	1	0.01	6,000	6,000	6,000

== Number of official languages ==
This is the list of countries sorted by the number of official languages. Only countries with three or more official languages, either nationally or locally, are included.

Country	Number	Source
Bolivia	37	
India	22	
Zimbabwe	16	
Mali	13	
South Africa	12	
Spain	5	
Papua New Guinea	4	
Rwanda	4	
Switzerland	4	
Singapore	4	
Burkina Faso	4	
Belgium	3	
Bosnia and Herzegovina	3	
Burundi	3	
Comoros	3	
Equatorial Guinea	3	
Fiji	3	
Luxembourg	3	
New Zealand	3	
Seychelles	3	
Vanuatu	3	

== See also ==
- Linguistic diversity index
- Lists of countries and territories by official language
- List of languages by total number of speakers
- List of languages by number of native speakers

== Notes ==
By ISO 639-3 code
Enter an ISO code to find the corresponding language article.
