= List of languages by number of native speakers =

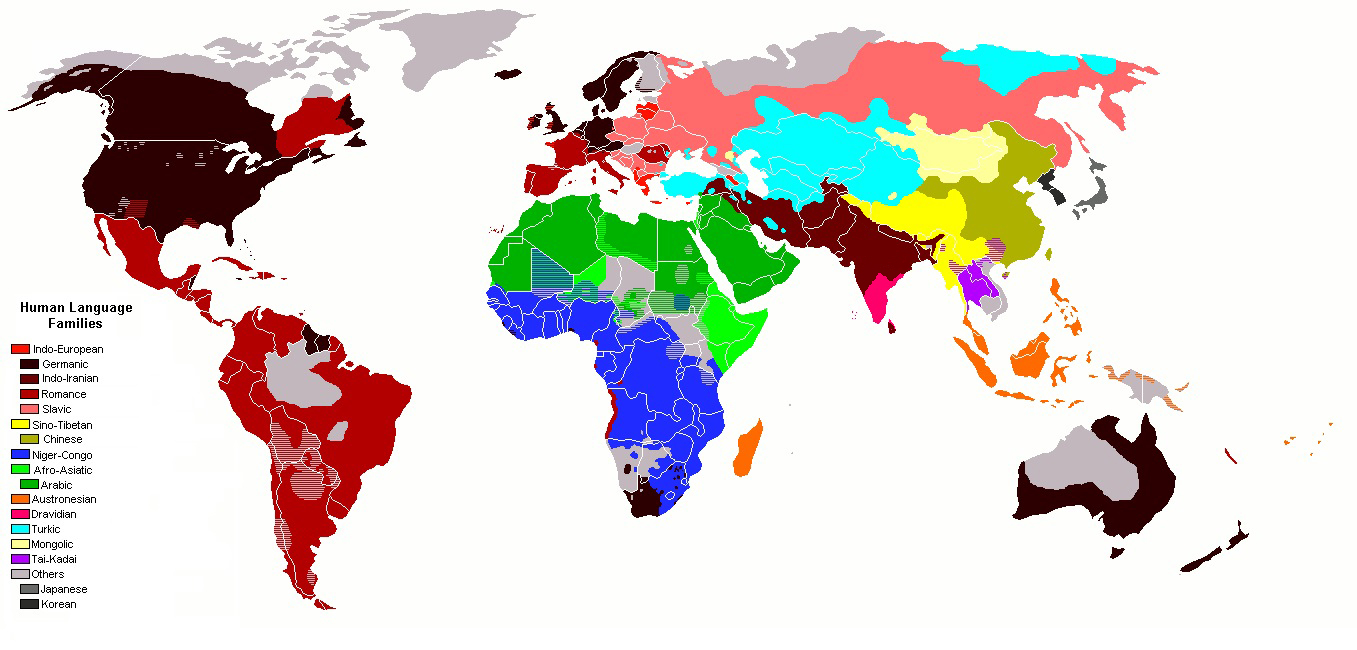
Current distribution of various human language families

This is a list of languages by number of native speakers.

All such rankings of human languages ranked by their number of native speakers should be used with caution, because it is not possible to devise a coherent set of linguistic criteria for distinguishing languages in a dialect continuum. For example, a language is often defined as a set of mutually intelligible varieties, but independent national standard languages may be considered separate languages even though they are largely mutually intelligible, as in the case of Danish and Norwegian. Conversely, many commonly accepted languages, including German, Italian, and English, encompass varieties that are not mutually intelligible. While Arabic is sometimes considered a single language centred on Modern Standard Arabic, other authors consider its mutually unintelligible varieties separate languages. Similarly, Chinese is sometimes viewed as a single language because of a shared culture and common literary language. It is also common to describe various Chinese dialect groups, such as Mandarin, Wu, and Yue, as languages, even though each of these groups contains many mutually unintelligible varieties.

There are also difficulties in obtaining reliable counts of speakers, which vary over time because of population change and language shift. In some areas, there is no reliable census data, the data is not current, or the census may not record languages spoken, or record them ambiguously. Sometimes speaker populations are exaggerated for political reasons, or speakers of minority languages may be underreported in favour of a national language.

== Top languages by population ==
=== Ethnologue (2026) ===
According to Ethnologue, the following languages have more than 50 million first-language speakers as of 2026. This section does not include entries that Ethnologue identifies as macrolanguages encompassing all their respective varieties, such as Arabic, Lahnda, Persian, Malay, Pashto, and Chinese.

Languages with at least 50 million first-language speakers
Language	Native speakers (millions)	Language family	Branch
Mandarin Chinese	988	Sino-Tibetan	Sinitic
Spanish	487	Indo-European	Romance
English	372	Indo-European	Germanic
Hindi	347	Indo-European	Indo-Aryan
Portuguese	252	Indo-European	Romance
Bengali	232	Indo-European	Indo-Aryan
Russian	133	Indo-European	Balto-Slavic
Japanese	124	Japonic	—N/a
Western Punjabi	90	Indo-European	Indo-Aryan
Turkish	86	Turkic	Oghuz
Vietnamese	86	Austroasiatic	Vietic
Yue Chinese	85	Sino-Tibetan	Sinitic
Egyptian Arabic	83	Afroasiatic	Semitic
Wu Chinese	83	Sino-Tibetan	Sinitic
Marathi	83	Indo-European	Indo-Aryan
Telugu	83	Dravidian	South-Central
Korean	82	Koreanic	—N/a
Tamil	79	Dravidian	South
Urdu	78	Indo-European	Indo-Aryan
Indonesian	78	Austronesian	Malayo-Polynesian
Standard German	76	Indo-European	Germanic
French	76	Indo-European	Romance
Javanese	69	Austronesian	Malayo-Polynesian
Iranian Persian	65	Indo-European	Iranian
Italian	60	Indo-European	Romance
Hausa	58	Afroasiatic	Chadic
Gujarati	58	Indo-European	Indo-Aryan
Levantine Arabic	55	Afroasiatic	Semitic
Bhojpuri	53	Indo-European	Indo-Aryan

=== CIA World Factbook (2018 estimates) ===
According to the CIA World Factbook, the most-spoken first languages in 2018 were:

Top first languages by percentage per CIA
Language	Percentage of world population (2018)
Mandarin Chinese	12.3%
Spanish	6.0%
English	5.1%
Arabic	5.1%
Hindi	3.5%
Bengali	3.3%
Portuguese	3.0%
Russian	2.1%
Japanese	1.7%
Western Punjabi	1.3%
Javanese	1.1%

== See also ==
- List of languages by total number of speakers
- List of sign languages by number of native signers
- List of language families (with number of speakers)
- List of official languages by country and territory
- List of countries by number of languages
- Languages used on the Internet
- List of ISO 639-3 codes
- Lists of languages
- List of languages by number of speakers in Europe
- Global language system
- Linguistic diversity index
- World language

By ISO 639-3 code
Enter an ISO code to find the corresponding language article.
