= David Graddol =

British linguist (1953–2019)

- Born: 1953; United Kingdom
- Died: 1 March 2019 (aged 65–66)

Philosophical work
- School: Linguistics
- Notable works: The Future of English? (1997)

David Graddol (1953 – 1 March 2019) was a British linguist who worked in applied linguistics, discourse analysis, sociolinguistics, and history of linguistics. He died on 1 March 2019.

== Research interest ==
He was perhaps best known for his 1997 book The Future of English?, published by the British Council, in which he offers scenarios for how English as a world language may develop. Most notably, he pointed out that native speakers of English were or would soon be outnumbered by those who speak English as a second or foreign language. In an article that focuses more specifically on this issue, he stated the following:

The decline of the native speaker in numerical terms is likely to be associated with changing ideas about the centrality of the native speaker to norms of usage. [...] Large numbers of people will learn English as a foreign language in the 21st century and they will need teachers, dictionaries and grammar books. But will they continue to look towards the native speaker for authoritative norms of usage?

— "The decline of the native speaker", pages 67–68

Graddol's views about English as a world language are similar to, though not identical with, those held by his linguist colleague David Crystal.

== Career ==
Graddol graduated from the University of York with a BA in Language and Linguistics in 1975, also in Sociology in 1983. He earned his PhD from the Stockholm University.

== Personal life ==
He married Margaret Keeton and they had triplet daughters.

== Works (selected) ==
- Graddol, David (1997). The Future of English? A guide to forecasting the popularity of the English language in the 21st century. London: British Council. Available for free from the website of the British Council.
- Graddol, David (1999). The decline of the native speaker. In Graddol, David/Meinhof, Ulrike (eds). English in a Changing World. AILA Review 13, 57–68.
- Graddol, David (2006). English Next. London: British Council. Available for free from the website of the British Council.
