= Linguistic diversity index =

Mother tongue language diversity

World map of linguistic diversity index (linearly proportional to the shading intensity). Data is from the 18th edition of Ethnologue: Languages of the World.

Linguistic diversity index (LDI) may refer to either Greenberg's (language) Diversity Index or the related Index of Linguistic Diversity (ILD) from Terralingua, which measures changes in the underlying LDI over time.

Greenberg's Diversity Index (LDI) is the probability that two people selected from the population at random will have different mother tongues; it therefore ranges from 0 (everyone has the same mother tongue) to 1 (no two people have the same mother tongue). The ILD measures how the LDI has changed over time; a global ILD of 0.8 indicates a 20% loss of diversity since 1970, but ratios above 1 are possible, and have appeared in regional indexes.

The computation of the diversity index is based on the population of each language as a proportion of the total population. The index cannot fully account for the vitality of languages. Also, the distinction between a language and a dialect is fluid and often political. A great number of languages are considered to be dialects of another language by some experts and separate languages by others. The index does not consider how different the languages are from each other, nor does it account for second language usage; it considers only the total number of distinct languages, and their relative frequency as mother tongues.

== Rankings by country ==
The UNESCO report cites an earlier (2005) edition of the Ethnologue as its own source for this particular data. The UNESCO report remains a useful independent source and benchmark year because of its wider availability. Footnotes do warn that the precise numbers should be used with some skepticism.

SIL International (2017)

Rank	Country / region	LDI
1	Papua New Guinea	0.988
2	Cameroon	0.974
3	Vanuatu	0.973
4	Solomon Islands	0.968
5	Central African Republic	0.959
6	Democratic Republic of the Congo	0.948
7	Benin	0.933
8	Chad	0.933
9	South Sudan	0.929
10	Uganda	0.929
11	Kenya	0.927
12	Mozambique	0.926
13	Liberia	0.917
14	India	0.914
15	Togo	0.905
16	Ivory Coast	0.900
17	Nigeria	0.890
18	Mali	0.873
19	South Africa	0.871
20	Tanzania	0.871
21	Ethiopia	0.862
22	Guinea-Bissau	0.859
23	Ghana	0.858
24	Gabon	0.846
25	Philippines	0.842
26	Sierra Leone	0.841
27	Zambia	0.830
28	Bhutan	0.827
29	Qatar	0.825
30	Republic of the Congo	0.821
31	East Timor	0.819
32	Indonesia	0.816
33	Sint Maarten	0.816
34	Afghanistan	0.790
35	Madagascar	0.789
36	Namibia	0.779
37	Senegal	0.778
38	The Gambia	0.776
39	Iraq	0.761
40	Singapore	0.761
41	Nepal	0.755
42	Pakistan	0.752
43	Thailand	0.752
44	Micronesia	0.751
45	New Caledonia	0.750
46	Angola	0.748
47	Guinea	0.748
48	Guam	0.736
49	Malaysia	0.735
50	Belize	0.721
51	Burkina Faso	0.721
52	Israel	0.719
53	Northern Mariana Islands	0.719
54	Suriname	0.709
55	Caribbean Netherlands	0.707
56	United Arab Emirates	0.707
57	Belgium	0.700
58	Oman	0.698
59	Laos	0.697
60	Bosnia and Herzegovina	0.694
61	Malawi	0.692
62	Saint Martin	0.689
63	Switzerland	0.683
64	Tokelau	0.679
65	Eritrea	0.672
66	Andorra	0.671
67	Bahrain	0.658
68	Monaco	0.652
69	Iran	0.638
70	Fiji	0.632
71	São Tomé and Príncipe	0.630
72	Luxembourg	0.622
73	Kuwait	0.605
74	Canada	0.603
75	Trinidad and Tobago	0.599
76	Zimbabwe	0.597
77	Yemen	0.581
78	Niger	0.571
79	Brunei	0.570
80	Bolivia	0.565
81	Comoros	0.551
82	Georgia	0.550
83	United States Virgin Islands	0.550
84	French Guiana	0.549
85	Wallis and Futuna	0.548
86	Libya	0.538
87	Latvia	0.526
88	Myanmar	0.522
89	China	0.521
90	Guatemala	0.518
91	Antigua and Barbuda	0.515
92	Guyana	0.514
93	Kazakhstan	0.514
94	Egypt	0.512
95	Gibraltar	0.511
96	The Bahamas	0.509
97	Djibouti	0.504
98	Albania	0.503
99	Barbados	0.500
100	British Virgin Islands	0.500
101	Jordan	0.498
102	North Macedonia	0.495
103	Taiwan	0.489
104	Ukraine	0.489
105	Nauru	0.487
106	Cayman Islands	0.475
107	Estonia	0.473
108	Palau	0.470
109	Uzbekistan	0.466
110	French Polynesia	0.463
111	Morocco	0.461
112	Italy	0.460
113	Kyrgyzstan	0.459
114	Marshall Islands	0.457
115	Turkmenistan	0.457
116	Réunion	0.452
117	Sri Lanka	0.446
118	Cyprus	0.444
119	Mayotte	0.438
120	Aruba	0.429
121	Saudi Arabia	0.427
122	Belarus	0.411
123	Netherlands	0.405
124	Lithuania	0.404
125	Botswana	0.397
126	Moldova	0.389
127	Syria	0.363
128	Algeria	0.360
129	Somalia	0.350
130	Turkey	0.345
131	Peru	0.339
132	Germany	0.336
133	United States	0.333
134	Norfolk Island	0.325
135	Bangladesh	0.318
136	Dominica	0.313
137	Sudan	0.307
138	Palestine	0.303
139	New Zealand	0.291
140	Panama	0.287
141	Curaçao	0.285
142	Equatorial Guinea	0.284
143	Russia	0.283
144	Spain	0.276
145	Tajikistan	0.276
146	Australia	0.274
147	Vietnam	0.267
148	Malta	0.255
149	Macau	0.253
150	France	0.252
151	Slovakia	0.247
152	Montenegro	0.244
153	Saint Barthélemy	0.244
154	Austria	0.234
155	Cook Islands	0.232
156	Mauritania	0.228
157	Bulgaria	0.226
158	Sweden	0.226
159	Serbia	0.224
160	Mauritius	0.216
161	Paraguay	0.215
162	American Samoa	0.210
163	Swaziland	0.209
164	Hong Kong	0.205
165	Azerbaijan	0.202
166	Lebanon	0.198
167	Greenland	0.196
168	Niue	0.192
169	Ecuador	0.182
170	Mongolia	0.179
171	Samoa	0.174
172	Finland	0.172
173	Slovenia	0.167
174	Argentina	0.165
175	United Kingdom	0.154
176	Romania	0.153
177	Turks and Caicos Islands	0.146
178	Anguilla	0.141
179	Jersey	0.136
180	Greece	0.123
181	Tunisia	0.122
182	Ireland	0.118
183	Seychelles	0.116
184	Uruguay	0.111
185	Saint Pierre and Miquelon	0.110
186	Mexico	0.106
187	Croatia	0.102
188	Cambodia	0.101
189	Brazil	0.099
190	Liechtenstein	0.092
191	Lesotho	0.091
192	Denmark	0.089
193	Rwanda	0.089
194	Guadeloupe	0.083
195	Bermuda	0.076
196	Czech Republic	0.072
197	Norway	0.067
198	Portugal	0.066
199	Grenada	0.064
200	Puerto Rico	0.060
201	Armenia	0.053
202	Nicaragua	0.052
203	Montserrat	0.050
204	Poland	0.050
205	Martinique	0.043
206	Dominican Republic	0.040
207	Venezuela	0.040
208	Honduras	0.039
209	Chile	0.036
210	Costa Rica	0.036
211	Japan	0.035
212	Hungary	0.033
213	Tonga	0.029
214	Saint Lucia	0.020
215	Tuvalu	0.020
216	Colombia	0.019
217	Kiribati	0.019
218	Jamaica	0.017
219	Saint Kitts and Nevis	0.012
220	Saint Vincent and the Grenadines	0.010
221	South Korea	0.010
222	Burundi	0.007
223	Guernsey	0.007
224	Iceland	0.007
225	El Salvador	0.003
226	Cuba	0.001
227	Haiti	0.000
228	Isle of Man	0.000
229	San Marino	0.000
230	Vatican City	0.000
231	British Indian Ocean Territory	0.000
232	North Korea	0.000

UNESCO (2009)

Rank	Country / region	LDI
1	Papua New Guinea	.990
2	Vanuatu	.972
3	Solomon Islands	.965
4	Tanzania	.965
5	Central African Republic	.960
6	Chad	.950
7	Democratic Republic of the Congo	.948
8	Cameroon	.942
9	India	.930
10	Mozambique	.929
11	Uganda	.928
12	Gabon	.919
13	Côte d'Ivoire	.917
14	Liberia	.912
15	Angola	.901
16	Kenya	.901
17	Togo	.897
18	Timor-Leste	.897
19	Mali	.876
20	Nigeria	.870
21	South Africa	.869
22	Zambia	.855
23	Guinea-Bissau	.853
24	Philippines	.849
25	Bhutan	.846
26	Indonesia	.846
27	Ethiopia	.843
28	Republic of the Congo	.820
29	Sierra Leone	.817
30	Namibia	.808
31	Ghana	.805
32	Iran	.797
33	Micronesia	.792
34	Suriname	.788
35	Benin	.785
36	United Arab Emirates	.777
37	Burkina Faso	.773
38	Senegal	.772
39	Pakistan	.762
40	Malaysia	.758
41	Thailand	.753
42	Eritrea	.749
43	Gambia	.748
44	Guinea	.748
45	Singapore	.748
46	Nepal	.742
47	Belgium	.734
48	Afghanistan	.732
49	Kazakhstan	.701
50	Trinidad and Tobago	.696
51	Belize	.693
52	Oman	.693
53	Guatemala	.691
54	Bolivia	.680
55	Laos	.678
56	Kyrgyzstan	.670
57	Jordan	.666
58	Israel	.665
59	Bahrain	.663
60	Norway	.657
61	Madagascar	.656
62	Niger	.646
63	Mauritius	.641
64	Saudi Arabia	.609
65	Qatar	.608
66	Fiji	.607
67	Nauru	.596
68	Latvia	.595
69	Italy	.593
70	Djibouti	.592
71	Moldova	.589
72	Sudan	.587
73	Yemen	.579
74	Georgia	.576
75	Andorra	.574
76	North Macedonia	.566
77	Kuwait	.556
78	Comoros	.551
79	Canada	.549
80	Switzerland	.547
81	Cayman Islands	.547
82	Austria	.540
83	Zimbabwe	.526
84	Monaco	.521
85	Myanmar	.521
86	Malawi	.519
87	Egypt	.509
88	Syria	.503
89	Luxembourg	.498
90	Gibraltar	.498
91	San Marino	.494
92	Ukraine	.492
93	China	.491
94	Iraq	.484
95	Tajikistan	.482
96	Estonia	.476
97	Morocco	.466
98	Brunei	.456
99	Equatorial Guinea	.453
100	Botswana	.444
101	Spain	.438
102	Uzbekistan	.428
103	Bosnia and Herzegovina	.416
104	Belarus	.397
105	Netherlands	.389
106	Sao Tome and Principe	.389
107	Aruba	.387
108	Bahamas	.386
109	Turkmenistan	.386
110	Cook Islands	.379
111	Peru	.376
112	Azerbaijan	.373
113	Cyprus	.366
114	Libya	.362
115	Serbia	.359
116	United States	.353
117	Paraguay	.347
118	Lithuania	.339
119	Bangladesh	.332
120	Mongolia	.331
121	Panama	.324
122	Dominica	.313
123	Algeria	.313
124	Sri Lanka	.313
125	Slovakia	.307
126	Turkey	.289
127	Russia	.283
128	France (Note: Including New Caledonia, a French Overseas Territory with a high level of Linguistic Diversity Index)	.272
129	Netherlands Antilles	.266
130	Ecuador	.264
131	Lesotho	.260
132	Albania	.257
133	Vietnam	.234
134	Swaziland	.228
135	Bulgaria	.224
136	Ireland	.223
137	Argentina	.213
138	Palestine	.208
139	Germany	.189
140	Somalia	.179
141	Greece	.175
142	Slovenia	.174
143	Armenia	.174
144	Mauritania	.172
145	Romania	.168
146	Sweden	.167
147	British Virgin Islands	.167
148	Lebanon	.161
149	Hungary	.158
150	Cambodia	.157
151	Turks and Caicos Islands	.145
152	Anguilla	.140
153	Finland	.140
154	Tuvalu	.139
155	United Kingdom	.139
156	Mexico	.135
157	Liechtenstein	.128
158	Australia	.126
159	New Zealand	.102
160	Uruguay	.092
161	Barbados	.091
162	Croatia	.087
163	Nicaragua	.081
164	Guyana	.078
165	Palau	.077
166	Niue	.071
167	Cape Verde	.070
168	Czech Republic	.069
169	Seychelles	.067
170	Grenada	.064
171	Poland	.060
172	Antigua and Barbuda	.057
173	Honduras	.056
174	Tokelau	.054
175	Dominican Republic	.053
176	Denmark	.051
177	Costa Rica	.050
178	Chile	.034
179	Kiribati	.033
180	Brazil	.032
181	Colombia	.030
182	Japan	.028
183	Marshall Islands	.027
184	Montserrat	.026
185	Venezuela	.026
186	Portugal	.022
187	Saint Lucia	.020
188	Iceland	.019
189	Malta	.016
190	Tonga	.014
191	Tunisia	.012
192	Jamaica	.011
193	Saint Kitts and Nevis	.010
194	Maldives	.010
195	Saint Vincent and the Grenadines	.009
196	El Salvador	.004
197	Burundi	.004
198	Rwanda	.004
199	South Korea	.003
200	Samoa	.002
201	Cuba	.001
202	Haiti	.000
203	Saint Helena	None
204	Vatican City	None
205	Montenegro	None
206	Bermuda	None
207	Hong Kong	None
208	Macau	None
209	North Korea	None

== See also ==
- Ethnologue
- Linguistic rights
- List of official languages by country and territory
- List of countries by number of languages
- Cultural diversity
