= List of languages by number of speakers in Europe =

This is a list of European languages sorted by the approximate number of native speakers in Europe only.

== List ==
Rank	Name	Native speakers	Total speakers
1	Russian	106,000,000	160,000,000
2	German	85,000,000	130,000,000
3	French	67,000,000	112,000,000
4	English	67,000,000	280,000,000
5	Italian	58,000,000	72,000,000
6	Spanish	40,000,000	76,000,000
7	Polish	38,000,000	
8	Ukrainian	32,600,000	
9	Romanian	24,000,000	28,000,000
10	Dutch	22,000,000	24,000,000
11 (Note: In linguistics, Serbo-Croatian is synonymous with standardised varieties of the Shtokavian dialect, which forms the basis of Bosnian, Croatian, Montenegrin and Serbian standard languages; thus these national forms are largely mutually intelligible varieties of one pluricentric language. Other Serbo-Croatian dialects, Chakavian, Kajkavian and Torlak, are also considered separate languages on terms of mutual intelligibility by linguists.)	Serbo-Croatian	19,000,000	
11	Turkish	15,752,673	
12	Bavarian	14,000,000	
13	Portuguese	11,000,000	
14	Hungarian	11,000,000	
15	Greek	11,000,000	
16	Czech	10,600,000	
17	Swedish	10,000,000	11,000,000
18	Catalan	10,000,000	
19	Serbian	9,000,000	
20	Bulgarian	7,800,000	
21	Albanian; Arbëresh; Arvanitika	5,367,000; 5,877,100 (Balkans)	
22	Neapolitan	5,700,000	
23	Croatian	5,600,000	
24	Danish	5,500,000	
25	Finnish	5,400,000	
26	Norwegian	5,200,000	
26	Slovak	5,200,000	
28	Swiss German	5,000,000	
29	Mainfränkisch	4,900,000	
30	Sicilian	4,700,000	
31	Tatar	4,300,000	
32	Venetian	3,800,000	
33	Lombard	3,600,000	
34	Belarusian	3,300,000	
35	Lithuanian	3,000,000	
36	Bosnian	2,500,000	
37	Galician	2,400,000	
38	Slovene	2,100,000	
39	Upper Saxon	2,000,000	
40	Irish	1,873,997 (census) 240,000	
41	Latvian	1,750,000	
42	Macedonian	1,600,000	
42	Piedmontese	1,600,000	
43	Romani	1,500,000	
44	Chechen	1,400,000	
45	Sardinian	1,350,000	
46	Limburgish	1,300,000 (2001)	
47	Bashkir	1,221,000	
48	Chuvash	1,100,000	
49	Estonian	1,165,400	
50	Low German (Low Saxon)	1,000,000	2,600,000
50	Kazakh	1,000,000	
50	Palatinate German	1,000,000	
53	Ripuarian (Platt)	900,000	
54	Swabian German	820,000	
55	Avar	760,000	
56	Basque	750,000	
57	Friulan	600,000	
57	Walloon	600,000	
57	Yiddish	600,000	
60	Welsh	538,000 899,500	750,000
61	Kabardian	530,000	
62	Silesian	522,000	
63	Maltese	520,000	
64	Azerbaijani	500,000	
64	Ligurian	500,000	
64	Mari	500,000	
64	Occitan	500,000	
68	Crimean Tatar	480,000	
69	Frisian	470,000	
70	Kumyk	450,000	
70	Ossetian	450,000	
72	Rhaeto-Romance	370,000	
73	Asturian (Astur-Leonese)	351,791	641,502
74	Udmurt	340,000	
75	Luxembourgish	336,000	386,000
76	Judaeo-Spanish (Ladino)	320,000	few
77	Icelandic	330,000	
78	Karachay-Balkar	300,000	
78	Ingush	300,000	
80	Montenegrin	240,700	
81	Komi	220,000	
81	Zeelandic	220,000	
83	Breton	206,000	
84	Extremaduran	200,000	
84	Picard	200,000	
86	Franco-Provençal (Arpitan)	140,000	
86	Gagauz	140,000	
87	Tabasaran	126,900	
88	Erzya	120,000	
89	Adyghe	117,500	
90	Aromanian	114,000	
91	Scots	110,000	
92	Võro	87,000	
93	Kalmyk	80,500	
94	Faroese	66,150	
95	Scottish Gaelic	57,000	
96	Norman	50,000	
96	Kashubian	50,000	
98	Abaza	49,800	
99	Karelian	36,000	
100	Corsican	30,000	125,000
100	Tat	30,000	
102	Aragonese	25,000	55,000
103	Sami	23,000	
104	Walser German	20,000	
104	Sorbian (Wendish)	20,000	
104	Italiot Greek	20,000 native speakers in 1981	50,000
107	Yenish	16,000	
108	Silesian German	11,000	
109	Nenets	4,000	
110	Mirandese	3,500	
111	Megleno-Romanian	3,000	
112	Kven	2,000-8,000	
113	Moksha	2,000	
113	Elfdalian	2,000	
114	Vepsian	1,640	
115	Istro-Romanian	1,100	
116	Istriot	900	
117	Cornish	557	
118	Cimbrian	400	
119	Judeo-Italian	250	
120	Manx	230	2,300
121	Ingrian	120	
122	Wymysorys	less than 20	70
123	Latin	dead	only several dozen and definitely less than 100
unranked	Emilian		
unranked	Romagnol		

== References ==
By ISO 639-3 code
Enter an ISO code to find the corresponding language article.
