= World language =

Language that is spoken internationally and often learned as a second language

A world language (sometimes called a global language or, rarely, an international language) is a language that is geographically widespread and makes it possible for members of different language communities to communicate. The term may also be used to refer to constructed international auxiliary languages.

English is the foremost world language and, by some accounts, the only one. Other languages that can be considered world languages include Arabic, French, Russian, and Spanish, although there is no clear academic consensus on the subject. Some writers consider Latin to have formerly been a world language.

== Concept ==
Various definitions of the term world language have been proposed; there is no general consensus about which one is best.

A definition proffered by Congolese linguist Salikoko Mufwene is "languages spoken as vernaculars or as lingua francas outside their homelands and by populations other than those ethnically or nationally associated with them". Linguist Mohamed Benrabah equates the term world language with what Dutch sociologist Abram de Swaan refers to as "supercentral languages" in his global language system. Spanish sociolinguist Clare Mar-Molinero proposes a series of tests that a language needs to pass, relating to demographics, attitudes towards the language, and political, legal, economic, scientific, technological, academic, educational, and cultural domains.

German sociolinguist Ulrich Ammon says that what determines whether something is a world language is its "global function", which is to say its use for global communication, in particular between people who do not share it as a native language and with use as a lingua franca—i.e. in communication where it is not the native language of any of the participants—carrying the most weight. Ammon formulates a series of indicators of globality, i.e. factors useful for assessing the extent to which a given language can be considered a world language. Chief among these indicators is the number of non-native speakers. Another indicator is the number of native speakers, which although it is not in itself a criterion for globality, empirically correlates positively with it and may influence it indirectly by making the language more attractive. Other potential indicators are economic strength (measured as the native speakers' GDP), number of countries that use the language as an official language as well as those countries' geographical distribution, international business use, and prevalence in scientific publications.

The term world language is also sometimes used in a different sense to refer to constructed international auxiliary languages such as Esperanto.

== Possible examples ==
=== Arabic ===
Arabic has been described by Salikoko Mufwene as a world language—albeit a second-tier one after English and French due to limited use as a lingua franca—on the grounds that it is a liturgical language amongst Muslim communities worldwide. Mohamed Benrabah criticizes this argument, writing that "Rote learning and reciting Koranic verses for daily prayers does not necessarily yield spoken proficiency", but nevertheless categorizes it as a world language on the grounds of it being a supercentral language in de Swaan's global language system.

=== English ===
Academic consensus is that English is a world language, with authors such as British linguists David Crystal and David Graddol considering it the only one. Authors who take a pluralist approach nevertheless consider English to inhabit a unique position as the foremost world language; for instance, in de Swaan's global language system, English is the sole occupant of the highest position in the hierarchy: the hypercentral language. According to German sociolinguist Ulrich Ammon, "[t]here is virtually no descriptive parameter or indicator for the international or global rank of a language which, if applied to today's languages worldwide, does not place English at the top". Ammon and Mufwene both posit that what sets English apart as the foremost world language is its use as a lingua franca, whereas Crystal focuses on its geographical distribution.

=== French ===
French has been described as a world language due to its status as a supercentral language in de Swaan's global language system, and Mufwene characterizes it as such based on it being spoken as a lingua franca or vernacular by people neither ethnically nor nationally associated with it outside of France.

=== Latin ===
Some authors consider Latin to have formerly been a world language.

=== Russian ===
Russian has been categorized as a world language on the grounds of being a supercentral language in de Swaan's global language system, and is characterised as a world language by Mufwene on the grounds that it is used as a vernacular or lingua franca outside of Russia by non-Russians.

=== Spanish ===
Spanish has been categorized as a world language on the grounds of being a supercentral language in de Swaan's global language system, and is considered a world language by German sociolinguist Ulrich Ammon as it is spoken as a foreign language worldwide. Mufwene also considers it a world language—albeit a second-tier one after English and French due to limited use as a lingua franca—on the grounds that it is used as a vernacular by people neither ethnically nor nationally associated with it outside of Spain.

== See also ==
- Lists of languages
  - List of lingua francas
  - List of languages by total number of speakers
  - List of languages by number of native speakers
  - List of official languages by country and territory
- Linguistic demography
- Language geography
- Pluricentric language
- Translingualisms
  - International scientific vocabulary
- Universal language
