= Abram de Swaan =

Dutch essayist, sociologist and professor emeritus (born 1942)

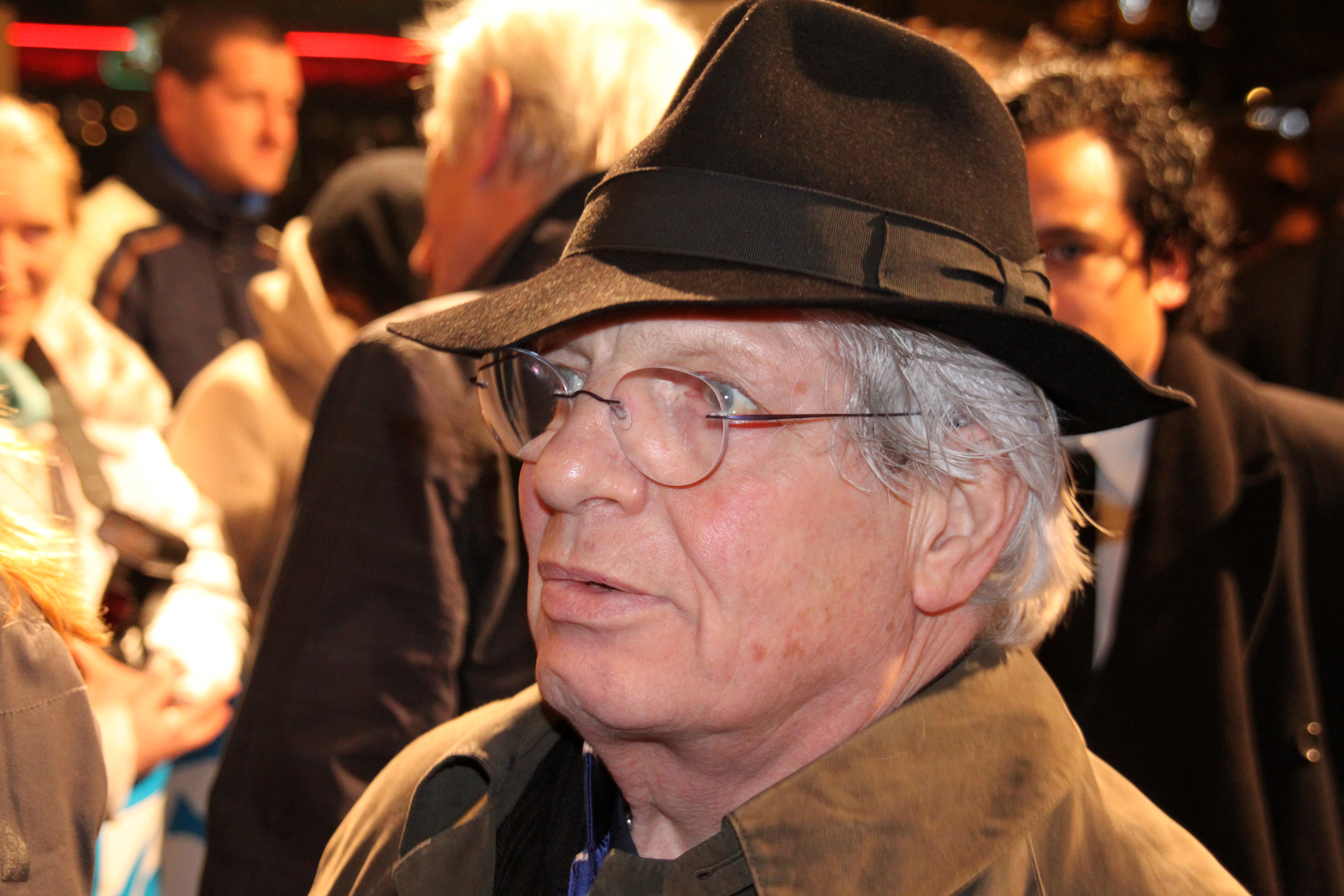
- De Swaan in 2010
- Born: 8 January 1942 (age 83); Amsterdam, Netherlands

Abram de Swaan (Dutch pronunciation: [ˈaːbrɑm də ˈsʋaːn]; born 8 January 1942) is a Dutch essayist, sociologist and professor emeritus from the University of Amsterdam.

In 1996, he became member of the Royal Netherlands Academy of Arts and Sciences. He was elected a member of the Academia Europaea in 2000.

He developed the concept of a global language system.

He received the P. C. Hooft Award in 2008.

== Bibliography ==
=== Books in Dutch ===
- Amerika in termijnen (1968)
- Halverwege de Heilstaat (essays; 1983)
- Zorg en de Staat (1989)
- Perron Nederland (1991)
- Moord en de staat (2003)
- Tegen de vrouwen (2019)

=== Books in English ===
- In Care of the State (1988)
- The Management of Normality (1990)
- Words of the World (2001)
- Human Societies: An Introduction (2013)
- The Killing Compartments (2015)

== Awards ==
- P. C. Hooft Award (2008) for his oeuvre
