= List of languages by total number of speakers =

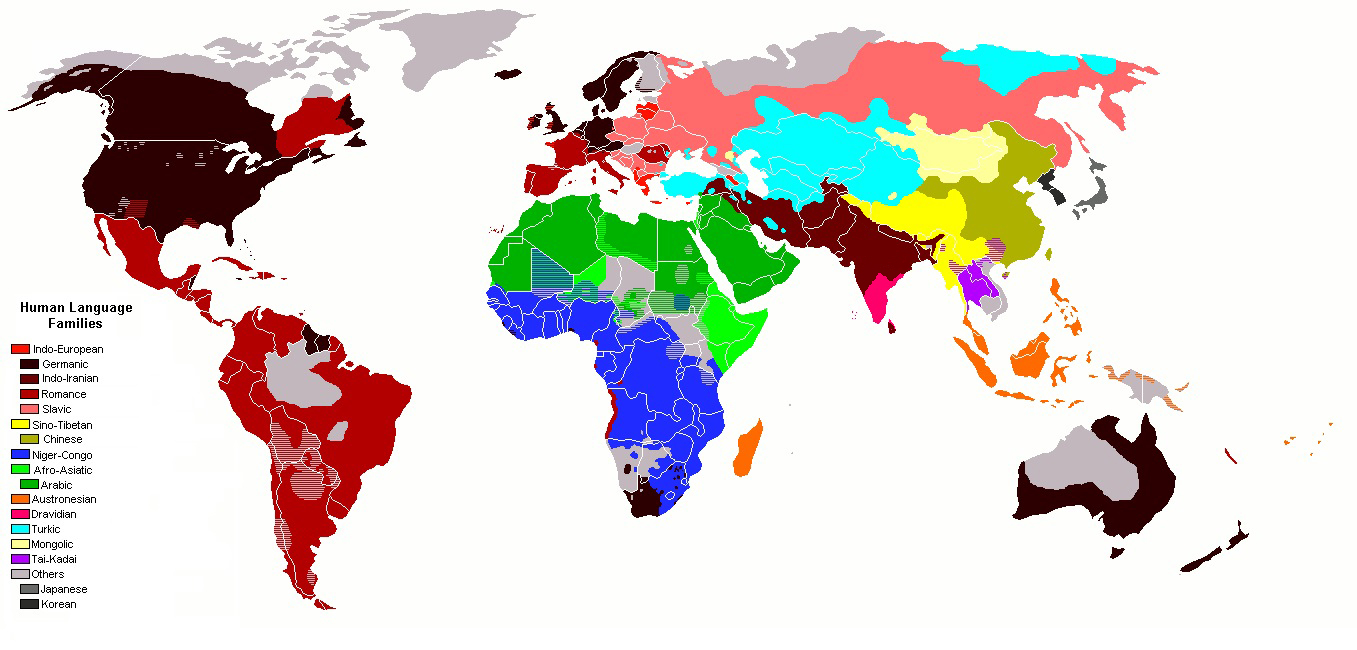
Current distribution of human language families

This is a list of languages by total number of speakers.

It is difficult to define what constitutes a language as opposed to a dialect. For example, while Arabic is sometimes considered a single language centred on Modern Standard Arabic, other authors consider its mutually unintelligible varieties separate languages. Similarly, Chinese is sometimes viewed as a single language because of a shared culture and common literary language, but sometimes considered multiple languages. Conversely, colloquial registers of Hindi and Urdu are almost completely mutually intelligible and are sometimes classified as one language, Hindustani. Rankings of languages should therefore be used with caution, as it is not possible to devise a coherent set of linguistic criteria for distinguishing languages in a dialect continuum.

There is no single criterion for how much knowledge is sufficient to be counted as a second-language (L2) speaker. For example, English has about 450 million native speakers but depending on the criterion chosen can be said to have as many as two billion speakers.

There are also difficulties in obtaining reliable counts of speakers, which vary over time because of population change and language shift. In some areas, there are no reliable census data, the data are not current, or the census may not record languages spoken or may record them ambiguously. Speaker populations may be exaggerated for political reasons, or speakers of minority languages may be underreported in favor of a national language.

== Ethnologue (2026) ==
Ethnologue lists the following languages as having 50 million or more total speakers. This section does not include entries that Ethnologue identifies as macrolanguages encompassing several varieties, such as Arabic, Lahnda, Persian, Malay, Pashto, and Chinese.

Most spoken languages, Ethnologue, 2026
Language	Family	Branch	Millions of speakers			UN official language
Language	Family	Branch	1st language (L1)	2nd language (L2)	Total (L1+L2)	UN official language
English (excl. creole languages)	Indo-European	Germanic	372	1,121	1,493	Yes
Mandarin Chinese (incl. Standard Chinese)	Sino-Tibetan	Sinitic	988	194	1,183	Yes
Hindi (excl. Urdu)	Indo-European	Indo-Aryan	347	264	611	No
Spanish (excl. creole languages)	Indo-European	Romance	487	75	561	Yes
Modern Standard Arabic (excl. dialects)	Afro-Asiatic	Semitic	0 (Note: Modern Standard Arabic (MSA) is not an L1. Arabic speakers first learn their respective local dialect. MSA is acquired through formal education.)	335	335	Yes
French (excl. creole languages)	Indo-European	Romance	75	258	334	Yes
Bengali	Indo-European	Indo-Aryan	234	43	274	No
Portuguese (excl. creole languages)	Indo-European	Romance	252	18	269	No
Indonesian	Austronesian	Malayo-Polynesian	78	177	255	No
Urdu (excl. Hindi)	Indo-European	Indo-Aryan	78	168	246	No
Russian	Indo-European	Balto-Slavic	133	77	210	Yes
Standard German	Indo-European	Germanic	76	57	133	No
Japanese	Japonic	—N/a	124	2	126	No
Nigerian Pidgin	English Creole	West African Pidgin English	5	116	121	No
Egyptian Arabic (excl. other Arabic dialects)	Afro-Asiatic	Semitic	83	35	118	No
Marathi	Indo-European	Indo-Aryan	83	16	99	No
Vietnamese	Austroasiatic	Vietic	86	11	97	No
Telugu	Dravidian	South-Central	83	13	96	No
Swahili	Niger–Congo	Bantu	4	91	95	No
Hausa	Afro-Asiatic	Chadic	58	36	94	No
Turkish	Turkic	Oghuz	86	7	94	No
Western Punjabi (excl. Eastern Punjabi)	Indo-European	Indo-Aryan	—N/a	—N/a	90	No
Tagalog (Note: Tagalog and Filipino are defined as two different languages in the ISO 639 standard. Ethnologue considers that Filipino is a standardized variety of the Tagalog language with no speakers.)	Austronesian	Malayo-Polynesian	33	54	87	No
Tamil	Dravidian	South	79	8	86	No
Yue Chinese (incl. Cantonese)	Sino-Tibetan	Sinitic	85	1	86	No
Wu Chinese (incl. Shanghainese)	Sino-Tibetan	Sinitic	83	<1	83	No
Iranian Persian (excl. other Persian dialects)	Indo-European	Iranian	65	17	82	No
Korean	Koreanic	—N/a	82	1	82	No
Amharic	Afro-Asiatic	Semitic	39	39	78	No
Thai	Kra–Dai	Zhuang–Tai	27	44	71	No
Javanese	Austronesian	Malayo-Polynesian	—N/a	—N/a	69	No
Italian	Indo-European	Romance	60	6	66	No
Gujarati	Indo-European	Indo-Aryan	58	5	62	No
Kannada	Dravidian	South	44	15	59	No
Levantine Arabic (excl. other Arabic dialects)	Afro-Asiatic	Semitic	55	3	58	No
Sudanese Arabic (excl. other Arabic dialects)	Afro-Asiatic	Semitic	43	11	54	No
Yoruba	Niger-Congo	Yoruboid	48	5	53	No
Bhojpuri	Indo-European	Indo-Aryan	53	<1	53	No

== The World Factbook (2022) ==
The World Factbook, formerly produced by the US Central Intelligence Agency (CIA), estimated the ten most spoken languages (L1 + L2) in 2022 as follows:

Most spoken languages, CIA, 2022
Language	Percentage of world population (2022)
English	18.8%
Mandarin Chinese	13.8%
Hindi	7.5%
Spanish	6.9%
French	3.4%
Arabic	3.4%
Bengali	3.4%
Russian	3.2%
Portuguese	3.2%
Urdu	2.9%

== See also ==
- Lingua franca
- Lists of languages
- List of languages by number of native speakers
- List of sign languages by number of native signers
- List of countries by number of languages
- List of countries and territories by official language
- World language
- Languages used on the Internet
- Extinct language
- Official languages of the United Nations
- Geolinguistics
- Language geography

== Explanatory notes ==
By ISO 639-3 code
Enter an ISO code to find the corresponding language article.
